= San Isidro Labrador Church =

Roman Catholic church in Bulacan, Philippines

Church of Pulilan
- Diocesan Shrine and Parish of San Isidro Labrador
- Pandiyosesis na Dambana at Parokya ni San Isidro Labrador
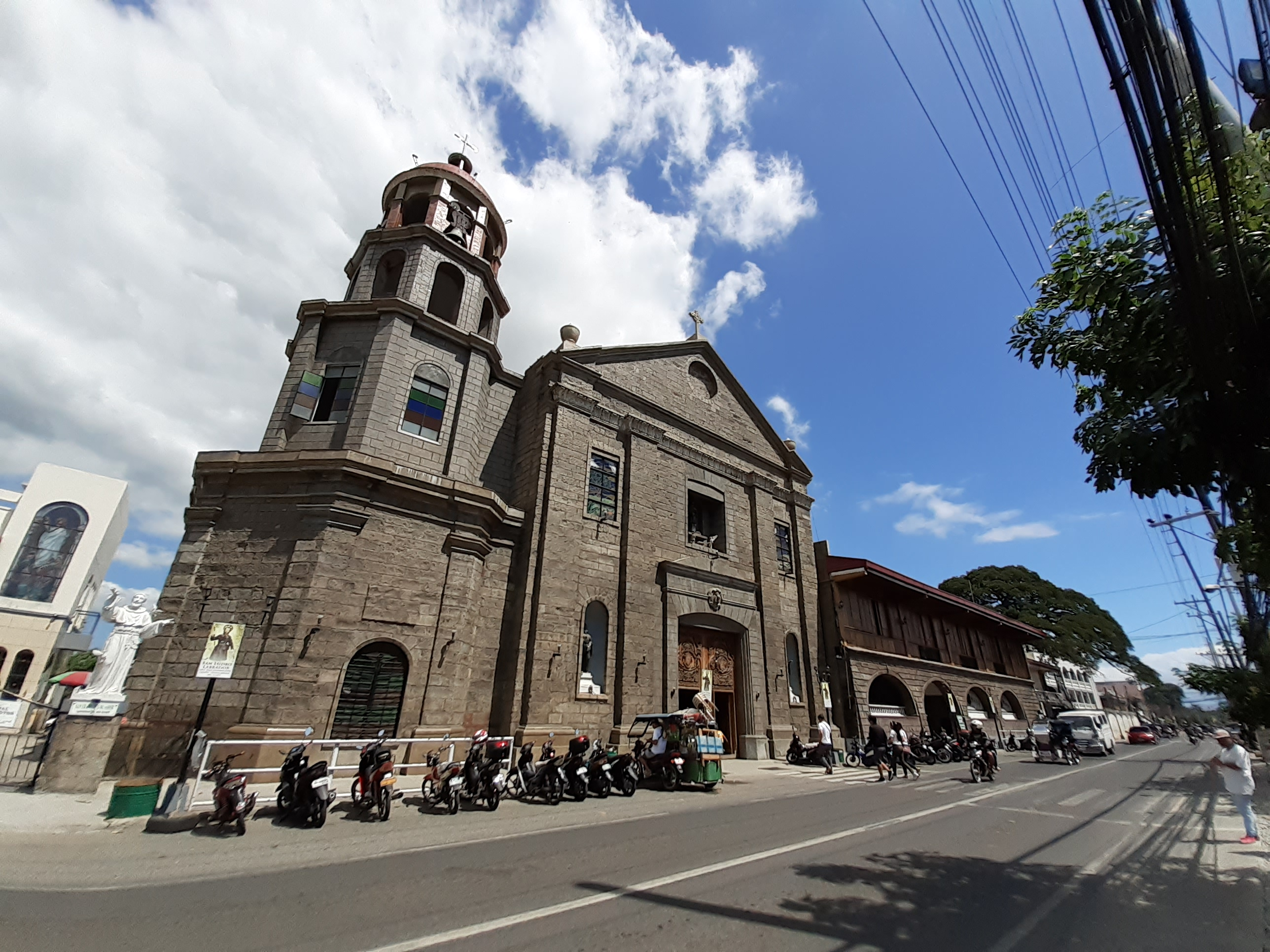
- Church facade in 2019

- Location in Bulacan Location in Luzon Location in the Philippines
- 14°54′10″N 120°50′56″E
- Location: Poblacion, Pulilan, Bulacan
- Country: Philippines
- Denomination: Roman Catholic

History
- Status: Parish church
- Founded: 1794
- Founder: Order of St. Augustine
- Dedication: Saint Isidore
- Dedicated: 07 February 2013
- Events: Elevated as Diocesan Shrine on 13 December 2020

Architecture
- Functional status: Active
- Architect: Juan Rico
- Architectural type: Church building
- Style: Baroque, Neo-Classical
- Completed: Before 1863

Specifications
- Materials: Stone, Sand, Gravel, Cement, Steel

Administration
- Province: Manila
- Diocese: Malolos
- Deanery: St. James the Apostle (Plaridel)

Clergy
- Archbishop: Jose Fuente Advincula
- Bishop: Dennis Cabanada Villarojo
- Rector: Dario "Dars" V. Cabral
- Vicar: Wyntelxnou Michikko G. Avila

The Diocesan Shrine and Parish of San Isidro Labrador, commonly known as Pulilan Church, is a 19th-century Baroque Roman Catholic church located at Brgy. Poblacion, Pulilan, Bulacan, Philippines. The parish church, dedicated to Saint Isidore, the Laborer, is under the Diocese of Malolos. The church is popular for being the site where water buffalos are made to kneel as tribute to the feast day of the patron saint. Like the Saint Augustine Parish from the nearby town of Baliuag, the church is also known for featuring one of the longest Holy Week Processions with at least 110 floats.

== History ==
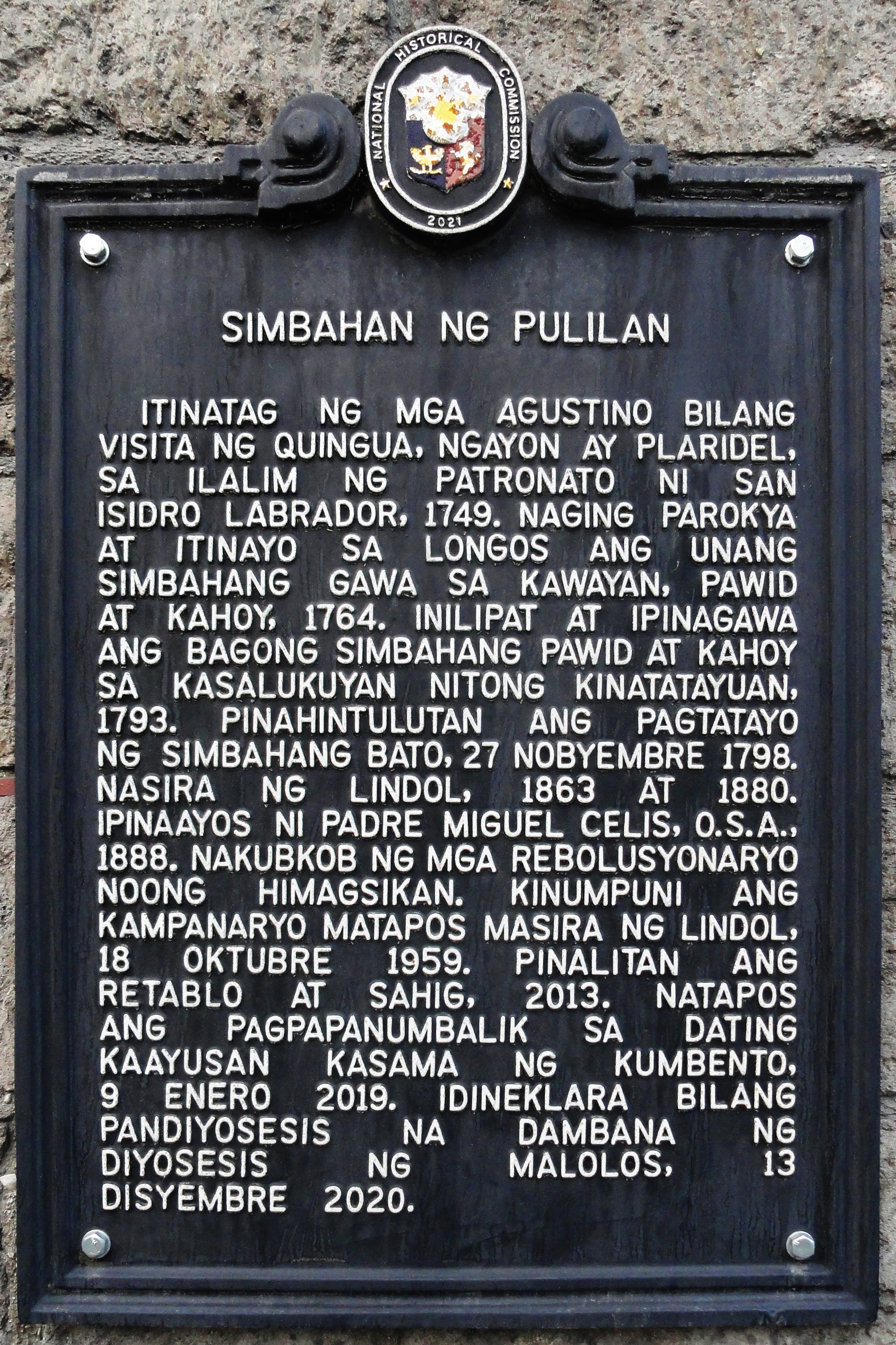
Church NHC historical marker installed in 2021

Pulilan, known before as barrio San Isidro or Buenavista, is a former barrio and parochial catchment of Quingua before it separated into a town with its own parish. Several sources provide varied claims as to the beginnings of the town and parish. One of such sources tells that the town was founded in 1749 under the advocation of San Isidro and was subsequently named Pulilan in 1850 by Ignacio Manzanares of Hagonoy in 1871. Likewise, Simon Barroso called the town San Isidro de Pulilan in 1873. The parish of Pulilan was declared as independent some time in 1780 to 1785 according to Martinez de Zuñiga, although it was not indicated in the report to the Augustinian Province in the Philippines in 1760.

On December 13, 2020, Bishop Dennis Villarojo elevated the parish church to the status of a diocesan shrine, making it the seventh in the Diocese of Malolos.

== Architecture ==
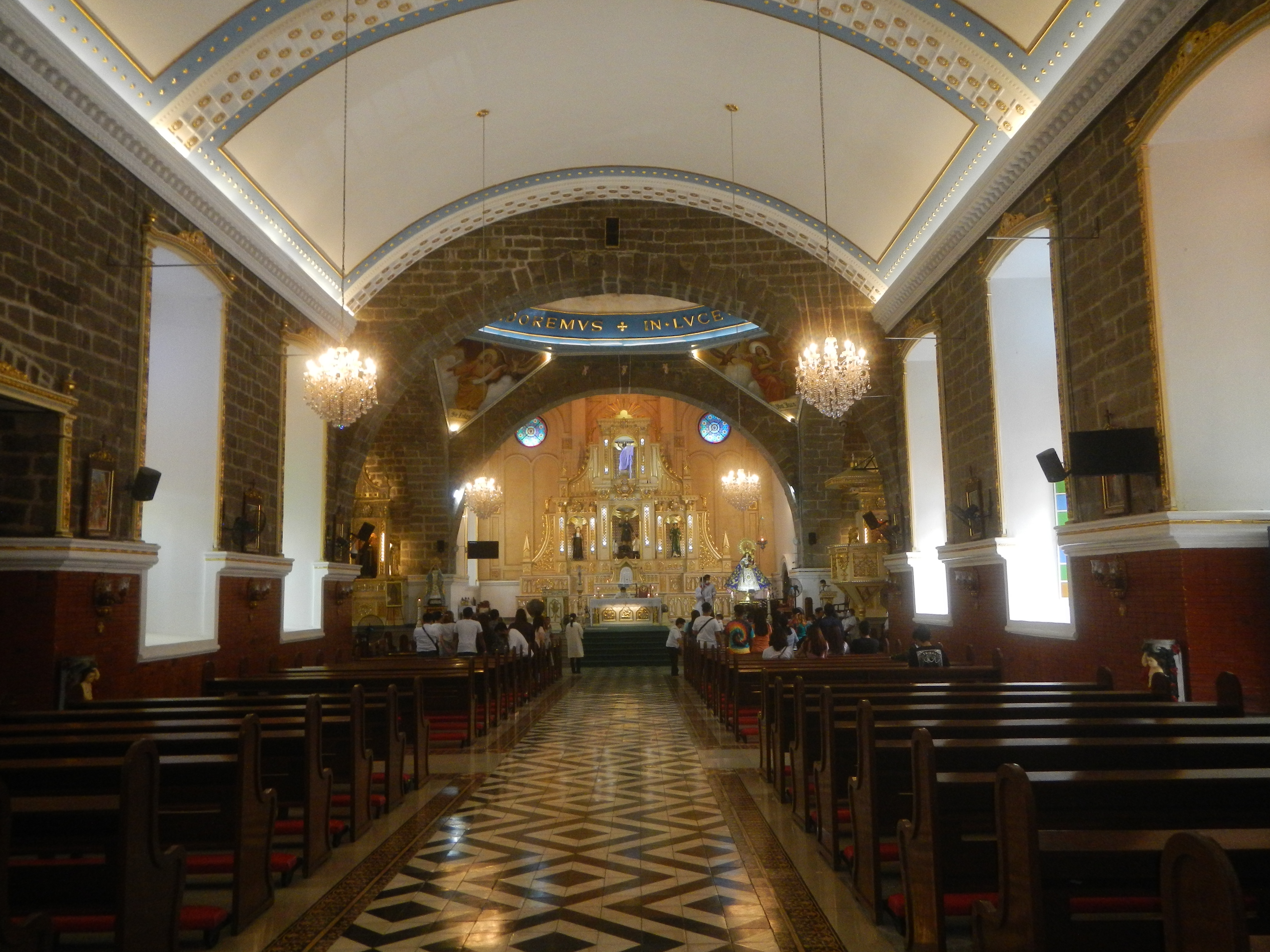
Church interior in 2021

Parochial structures of light materials were said to have been built immediately after the erection of the parish. In 1826, Juan Rico started the construction of a new church. One record tells that the church is still under construction in 1829 as it says all churches in Bulacan are already made of masonry except for the church of Pulilan which was still under construction. Two earthquakes, on June 3, 1863, and 1880, damaged the church greatly. Miguel de Celis rebuilt the church a few years later.

The façade of the church is predominantly neo-classical and is devoid of heavily detailed ornamentation. Rectangular pilasters divide the façade into three vertical sections capped off by a triangular pediment. The façade is punctured by rectangular openings: three rectangular windows and one canopied rectangular main portal. Only the Augustinian emblem on the pediment, motifs on the cornice and the balustrade on the belfry break the monotony of design. The plastered façade contrasts greatly with the bare stone walls on the side and interior of the church. To the right of the church is the three-tiered bell tower, with the top level done in concrete.

== Pulilan Carabao festival ==
During the May 14 and 15 every year, Pulilan holds the Kneeling Carabao Festival as tribute to their patron saint. Farm animals especially carabaos or water buffalos are paraded in front of the church. The highlight of the fiesta is the genuflection or kneeling of the carabaos with its two front legs in front of the church as sign of reverence to Saint Isidore.
