= Pulilan =

Municipality in Bulacan, Philippines

- Municipality
- Municipality of Pulilan
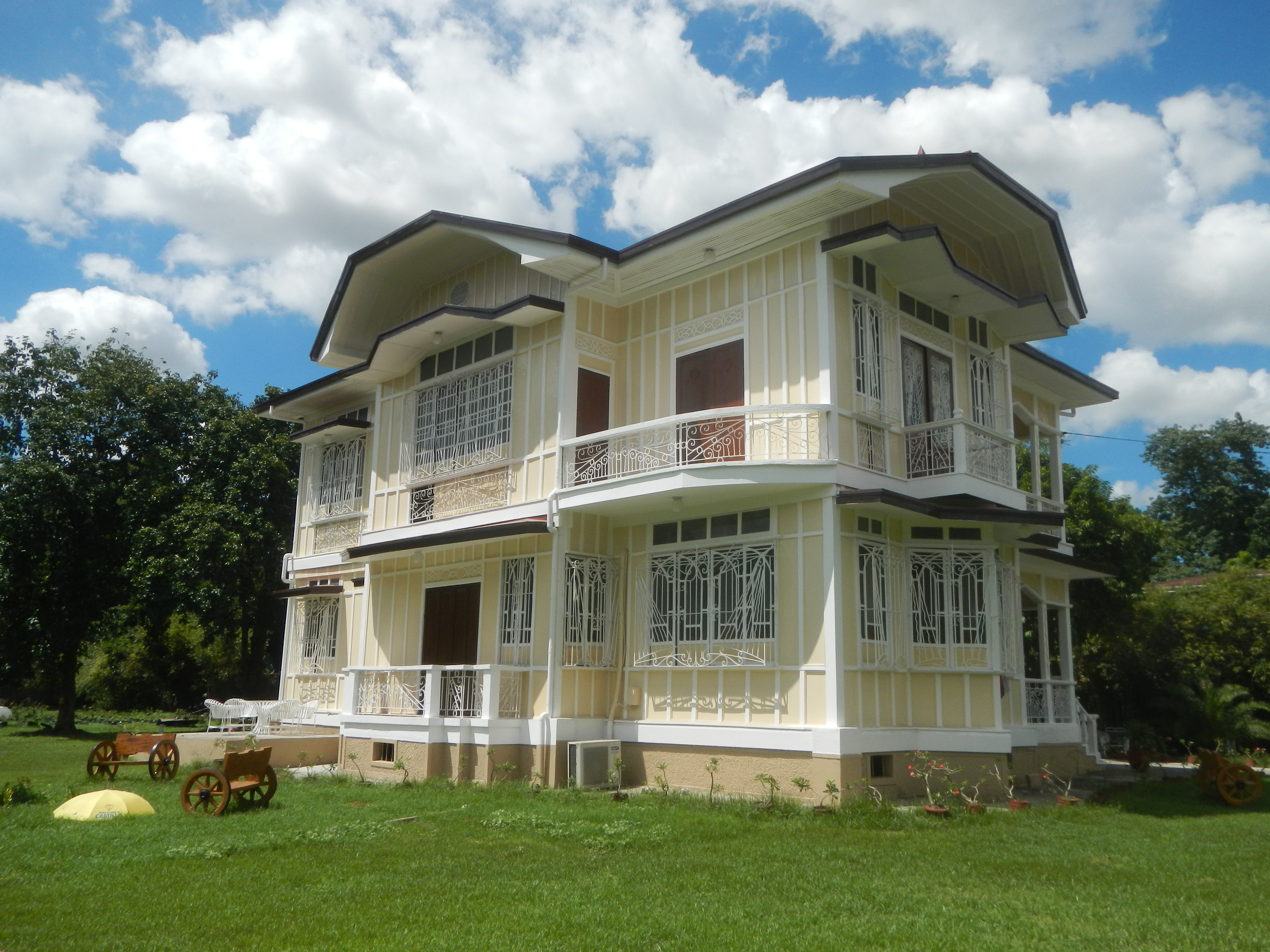
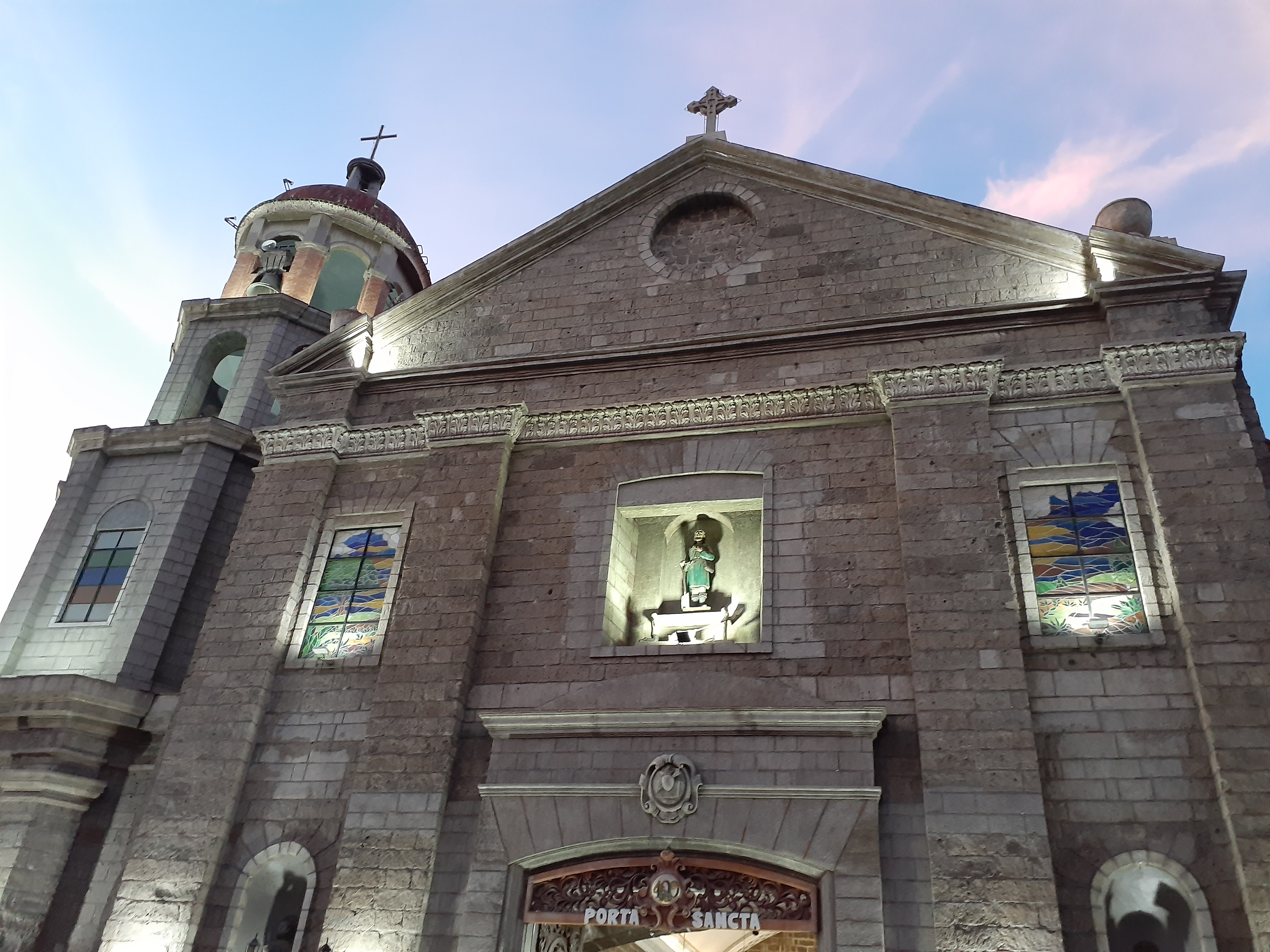
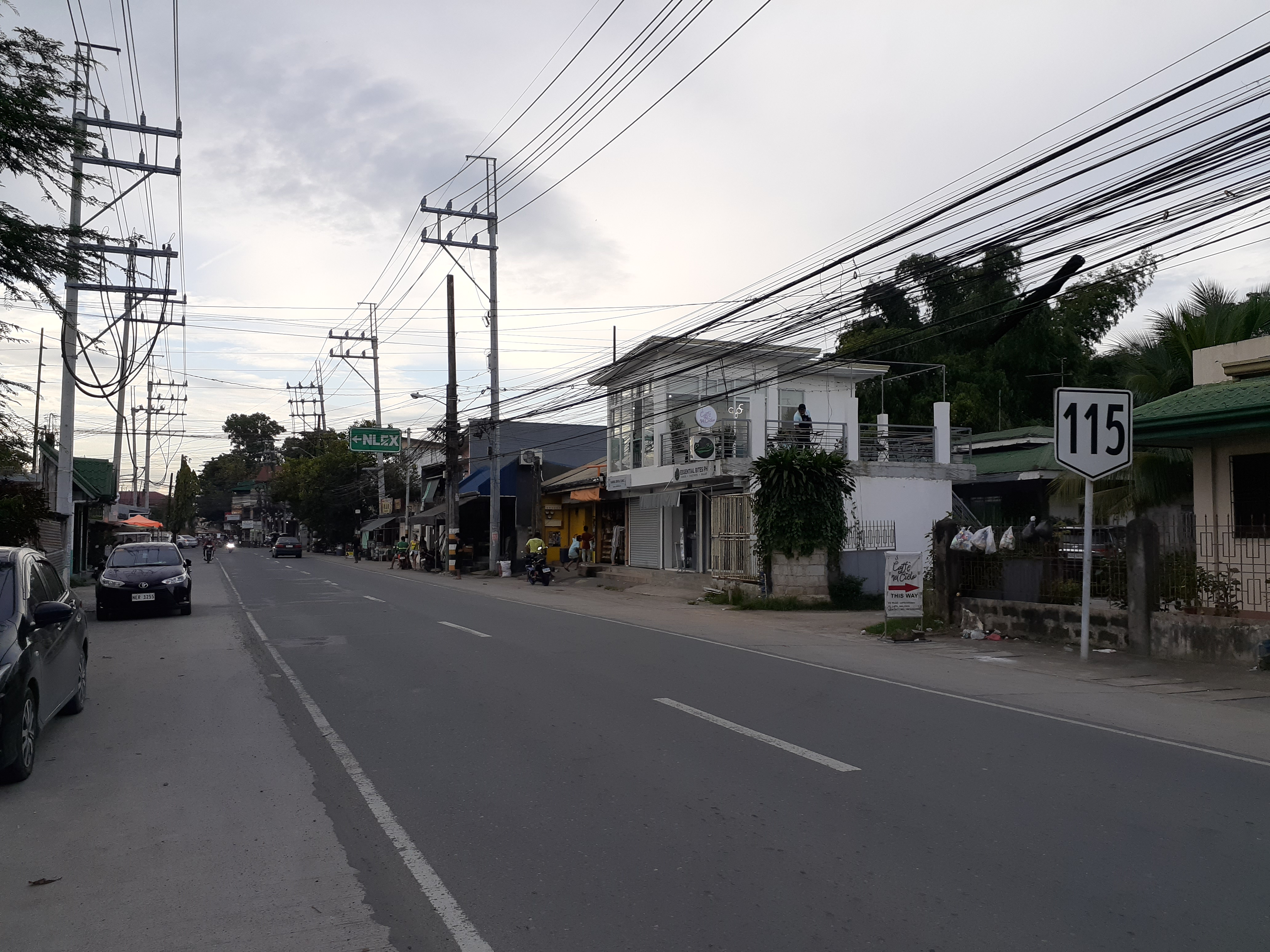
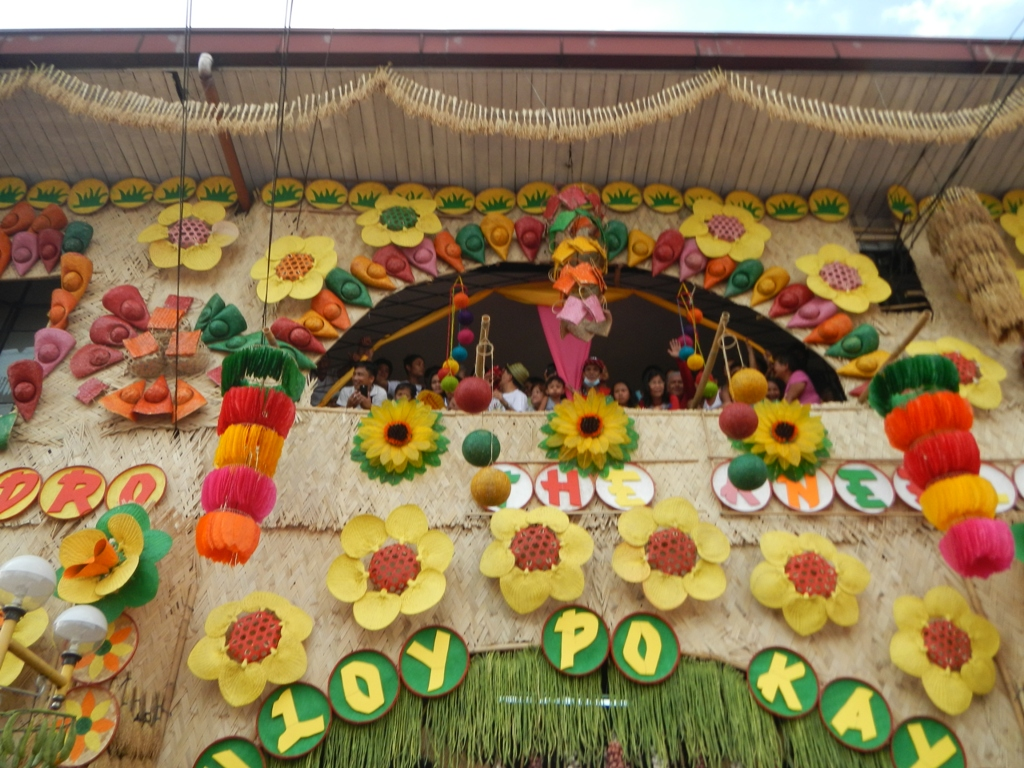
- From top, left to right: Ancestral house in Pulilan; San Isidro Labrador Parish Church; Pulilan–Calumpit Road; and church decorations at the annual Carabao festival

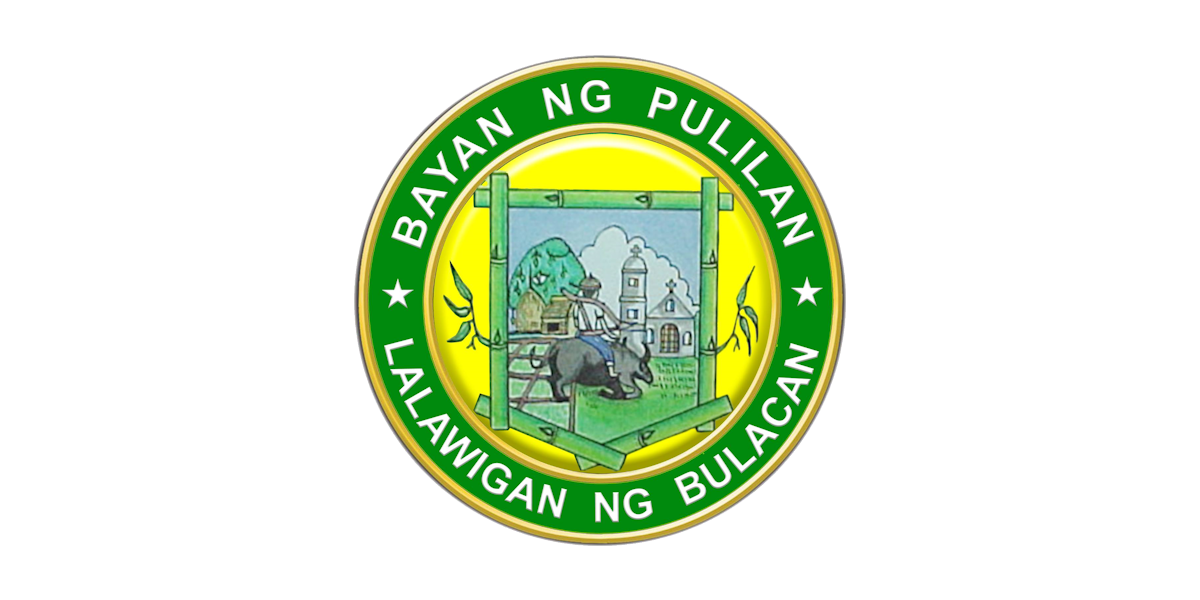
- Flag Seal
- Nicknames: Pulo ng Ilan; Center of Commerce and Industry in Northern Bulacan; Home of the Kneeling Carabao Festival
- Motto: Celebrate Pulilan Power!
- Anthem: Ako ang Pulileño; English: (I am a Pulileño)
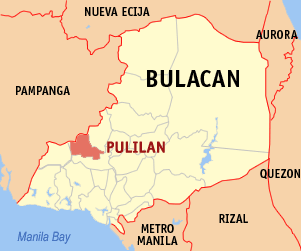
- Map of Bulacan with Pulilan highlighted
- Interactive map of Pulilan
- Location within the Philippines
- Coordinates: 14°54′07″N 120°50′56″E
- Country: Philippines
- Region: Central Luzon
- Province: Bulacan
- District: 1st district
- Founded: January 20, 1796
- Barangays: 19 (see Barangays)

Government
  - Type: Sangguniang Bayan
  - Mayor: Rolando S. Peralta Jr. (Lakas)
  - Vice Mayor: Imelda D. Cruz (Lakas)
  - Representative: Danilo A. Domingo (NUP)
  - Municipal Council: Members: Gilbert S. Munoz; Zandro C. Hipolito; Peter John T. Dionisio; Francisco D. Cruz Jr.; Rodolfo E. Arceo; Rolando G. Payumo; John J. Nethercott; Reynaldo J. Clemente Jr.
  - Electorate: 68,392 voters (2025)

Area
  - Total: 39.89 km^{2} (15.40 sq mi)
- Elevation: 14 m (46 ft)
- Highest elevation: 42 m (138 ft)
- Lowest elevation: 1 m (3.3 ft)

Population (2024 census)
  - Total: 111,384
  - Density: 2,792/km^{2} (7,232/sq mi)
  - Households: 28,066
- Demonym(s): Pulileño (male); Pulileña (female)

Economy
  - Income class: 1st municipal income class
  - Poverty incidence: 11.41% (2023)
  - Revenue: ₱ 741.6 million (2024)
  - Assets: ₱ 1,609 million (2024)
  - Expenditure: ₱ 693 million (2024)
  - Liabilities: ₱ 802.5 million (2024)

Utilities
  - Electricity: Meralco
- Time zone: UTC+8 (PST)
- ZIP code: 3005
- PSGC: 0301418000
- IDD : area code: +63 (0)44
- Native languages: Tagalog; Kapampangan
- Website: www.pulilan.gov.ph

Pulilan, officially the Municipality of Pulilan (Tagalog: Bayan ng Pulilan, Kapampangan: Balen ning Pulilan), is a municipality in the province of Bulacan, Philippines. According to the 2024 census, it has a population of 111,384 people.

The town is famous for its Carabao Festival where carabaos are paraded and kneel as they pass through San Isidro Labrador Parish Church, in honor to the town's patron saint, San Isidro Labrador.

Many years ago, Pulilan was primarily a little-known rural town in the northern part of Bulacan where its economy heavily dependent on farming and poultry raising. Most of the population committed their entire lives on farming as their livelihood. Today, the town is moving towards commercialization and industrialization as it is becoming one of the major growth-rate area and center of commerce and industry in the province.

Because of the major economic growth, due to presence of commercial establishments, real estates, industrial plants and major road projects. Pulilan has experienced increased in the total gross income in the past few years. The town's income in year 2016 was P323.86 million, an increase of P69.27 million from its previous income in 2014. It surpass the income of fifteen municipalities in Bulacan such as San Miguel, Bocaue, Plaridel, Hagonoy and Calumpit.

With the continuous expansion of Metro Manila, Pulilan is part of Manila's built-up area which reaches San Ildefonso, Bulacan at its northernmost part.

== Etymology ==
Pulilan was originally a marshy swampland which forms part of Pampanga, along the Candaba Bay. Because of the vastness of its area, Pulilan was created out of the districts of Baliuag and Quingua (now Plaridel) and coming from the Pampango word "Kengwa", meaning on the other side of the shore or kabilang ibayo.

In 1794, the place was named San Isidro by the missionary Augustinian friars in honor of San Isidro Labrador, the patron saint of the farmers. On January 20, 1796, it was called Pulilan. There are no written records how the place is named Pulilan; but legend has it that is derived from Pulo ng Ilan, literally, clusters of small communities or isles.

According to Antoon Postma in his "The Laguna Copperplate Inscription (LCI) – A Valuable Philippine Document" this copperplate with inscription discovered at Lumbang River near the Laguna Lake area in Laguna dates back to 900 A.D. In this inscription was mentioned the name Puliran, as the old name for southeastern lake area. The toponyms or place names Puliran is Pulilan, Bulacan and Pulilan is in Laguna de Bay. However, Postma is convinced in his studies that Pulilan in the LCI is the Pulilan along the Angat River in Bulacan, north of Manila.

== History ==
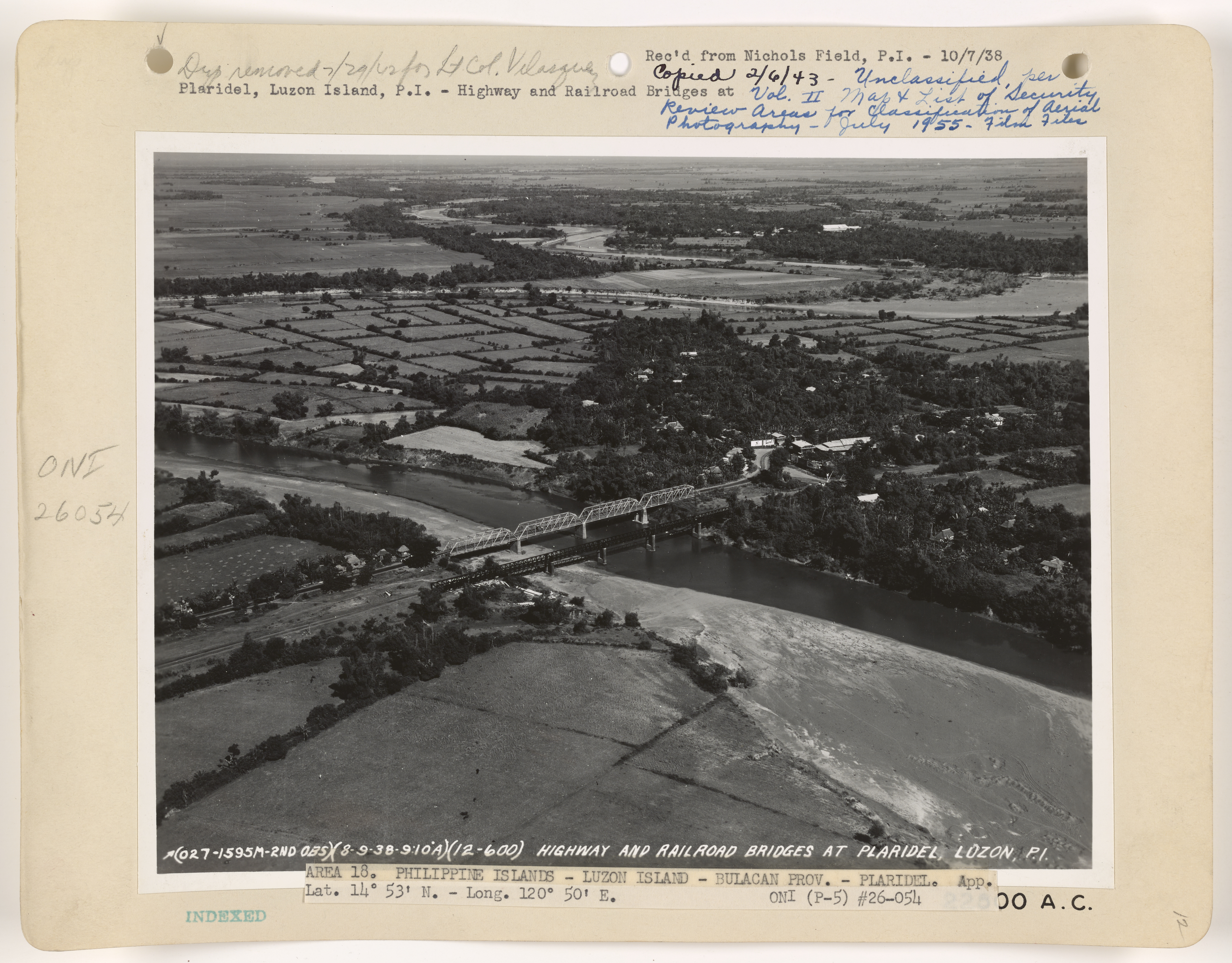
Old Plaridel–Pulilan Bridge and Angat River bridge of the former Bigaa–Cabanatuan branch line of the Philippine National Railways, in the 1930s. The municipality is visible in the background.

The first time Pulilan was settled was unknown but if existing records of the towns of Calumpit and Baliuag, between which the town lies, be made a basis, it could be deduced that in the early part of the 17th century it could have had a sprinkling of settlers. However, the ancient town of Pulilan was first documented as Puliran in the Laguna Copperplate Inscription, a pre-colonial oldest document of Philippines written in 900 A.D in Indianized script. The native population at the time of the document were ruled by the sovereign Lord Ka-Sumuran.

During Spanish regime, an Augustian friar, Fray Vicente Villamanzaro, was made to declare the settlement of a town on January 20, 1796. It was assigned a patron saint, San Isidro Labrador, after whose name he wanted the town identified. On this time, the head of the town was called Kapitan. It was only in 1819 that Pulilan has as its first Kapitan, Kapitan Francisco Paltao. In 1898, the first Presidente Municipal was Froilan Cahiwat. In 1904, when Anacleto Batongbacal was the Presidente Municipal, Pulilan was annexed to Quingua and became its sitio. In 1908, as the Pulilenos rallied behind the candidacy of their son Adriano Salvador, he was elected Presidente Municipal of Quinqua. Then in 1909, representations were made by Eugenio Tiangco, Hilario Esguerra, Adriano Salvador and others with Governor Teodoro Sandico to separate Pulilan from Quingua. It was granted. Pulilan then became a town, with Tiangco as its Presidente. In 1946, Catalino Flores was appointed as the first Mayor of Pulilan.

=== Third Republic ===
Former government official Paquito Ochoa Sr. ran as a Liberal candidate for mayor in 1967 and won, defeating Nacionalista candidate Arsenio Sulit. On August 21, 1971, senator Ninoy Aquino attended Ochoa's birthday celebration in Pulilan, which resulted in Aquino avoiding the Plaza Miranda bombing that occurred on the same day in Manila where his partymates were.

== Geography ==
=== Topography ===
Pulilan is one of the 21 towns of Bulacan province, located in about its center—from north to south. It lies 43 kilometres (27 mi) north-west of Manila, the national capital, 20 kilometres (12 mi) from Malolos, the provincial capital, and 2 kilometres (1.2 mi) from Plaridel. It has an area of about 4,073 hectares (40.73 sq. kilometers). It is bounded on the north by Apalit in Pampanga; on the east by Baliwag; on the south by Plaridel; and on the west by Calumpit. The Angat River cutting its way through the eastern edge of Baliwag, and the southern fringes of Pulilan down to the tributary of Manila Bay south-west of Calumpit, serves as the boundary with Plaridel.

The municipality is generally of flat topography. Eleven (11) of its barangays are bounded by the Angat River. The rest are flat irrigated rice lands. Soil types vary from sandy loam to clay loam which makes the municipality suitable to a wide range of agricultural products.

Most of the barangays in Pulilan have low susceptibility to flooding. Those portion with moderate to high susceptibility to flooding are barangays that are near or adjacent to creeks that are tributaries of the Angat River and barangays that are low-lying such as Dulong Malabon and Inaon.

=== Land use ===
Most of the existing municipal land use area is for agricultural purposes, about 27.92 square kilometres (10.78 sq mi) or 68.55% of the town's land area is primarily for crop production. While the 12.8076 square kilometres (4.95 sq. mi) or 31.45% of available land is dedicated for residential, commercial, industrial and institutional purposes.

=== Climate ===
Based on the Köppen climate classification system, the climate is tropical in Pulilan. During most months of the year, there is significant rainfall in Pulilan. There is only a short dry season. According to Köppen and Geiger, this climate is classified as Am. The temperature here averages 27.2 °C. The average annual rainfall is 792 mm. The driest month is February. There is 4 mm of precipitation in February. Most precipitation occurs in July, with an average of 151 mm. With an average of 29.2 °C, May is the warmest month. In January, the average temperature is 25.5 °C. It is the lowest average temperature of the whole year. The precipitation varies 147 mm between the driest month and the wettest month. The average temperatures vary during the year by 3.7 °C.

Climate data for Pulilan, Bulacan
Month	Jan	Feb	Mar	Apr	May	Jun	Jul	Aug	Sep	Oct	Nov	Dec	Year
Mean daily maximum °C (°F)	28 (82)	29 (84)	31 (88)	33 (91)	32 (90)	31 (88)	30 (86)	29 (84)	29 (84)	30 (86)	30 (86)	28 (82)	30 (86)
Mean daily minimum °C (°F)	20 (68)	20 (68)	21 (70)	22 (72)	24 (75)	24 (75)	24 (75)	24 (75)	24 (75)	23 (73)	22 (72)	21 (70)	22 (72)
Average precipitation mm (inches)	6 (0.2)	4 (0.2)	6 (0.2)	17 (0.7)	82 (3.2)	122 (4.8)	151 (5.9)	123 (4.8)	124 (4.9)	99 (3.9)	37 (1.5)	21 (0.8)	792 (31.1)
Average rainy days	3.3	2.5	11.7	6.6	17.7	22.2	25.2	23.7	23.2	17.9	9.2	5.2	168.4
Source: Meteoblue

=== Barangays ===
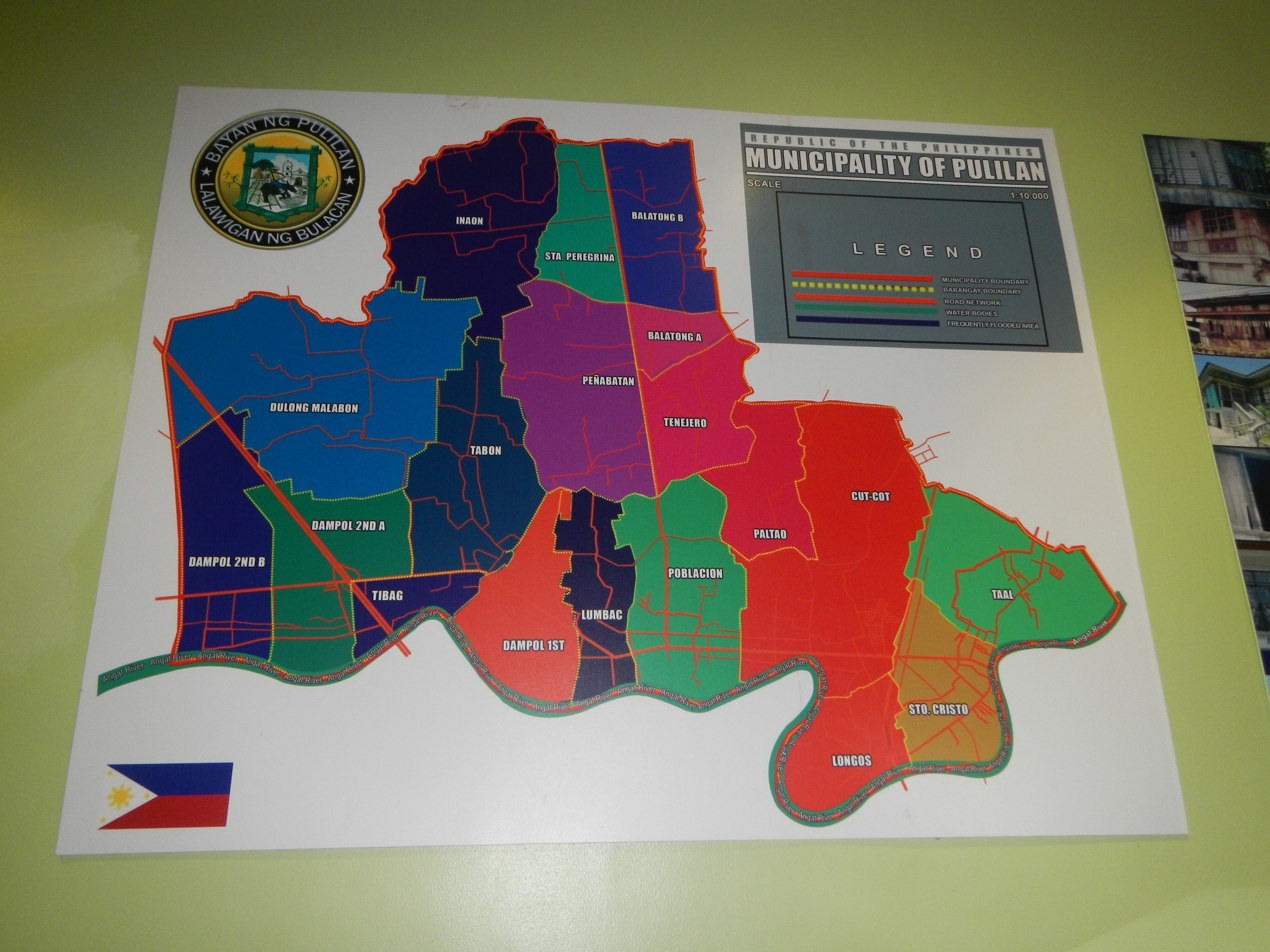
Pulilan Map

Pulilan is politically subdivided into 19 barangays, as shown in the matrix below. Each barangay consists of puroks and some have sitios.

The biggest barangay in terms of land area is Dulong Malabon while the most populated barangay is Poblacion and the least populated barangay is Santa Peregrina.

PSGC	Barangay	Population			±% p.a.	
		2024		2010		
031418001	Balatong A	1.7%	1,877	1,553	▴	1.31%
031418002	Balatong B	3.7%	4,100	3,402	▴	1.29%
031418003	Cutcot	7.5%	8,320	4,844	▴	3.80%
031418005	Dampol 1st	6.1%	6,770	5,602	▴	1.31%
031418006	Dampol 2nd A	4.4%	4,896	3,001	▴	3.43%
031418007	Dampol 2nd B	4.8%	5,317	3,958	▴	2.05%
031418008	Dulong Malabon	3.7%	4,114	4,180	▾	−0.11%
031418009	Inaon	8.5%	9,453	7,530	▴	1.58%
031418010	Longos	5.2%	5,817	5,105	▴	0.90%
031418011	Lumbac	4.3%	4,766	3,958	▴	1.29%
031418018	Paltao	5.8%	6,457	5,705	▴	0.86%
031418020	Peñabatan	2.1%	2,377	1,925	▴	1.46%
031418022	Poblacion	12.0%	13,353	11,858	▴	0.82%
031418025	Sta Peregrina	1.5%	1,666	1,335	▴	1.54%
031418026	Sto Cristo	6.9%	7,700	6,405	▴	1.28%
031418033	Taal	7.1%	7,912	5,711	▴	2.27%
031418034	Tabon	4.4%	4,931	3,649	▴	2.10%
031418035	Tibag	4.4%	4,857	2,845	▴	3.75%
031418037	Tinejero	3.7%	4,153	2,845	▴	2.64%
	Total		111,384	85,844	▴	1.81%

=== Land area ===
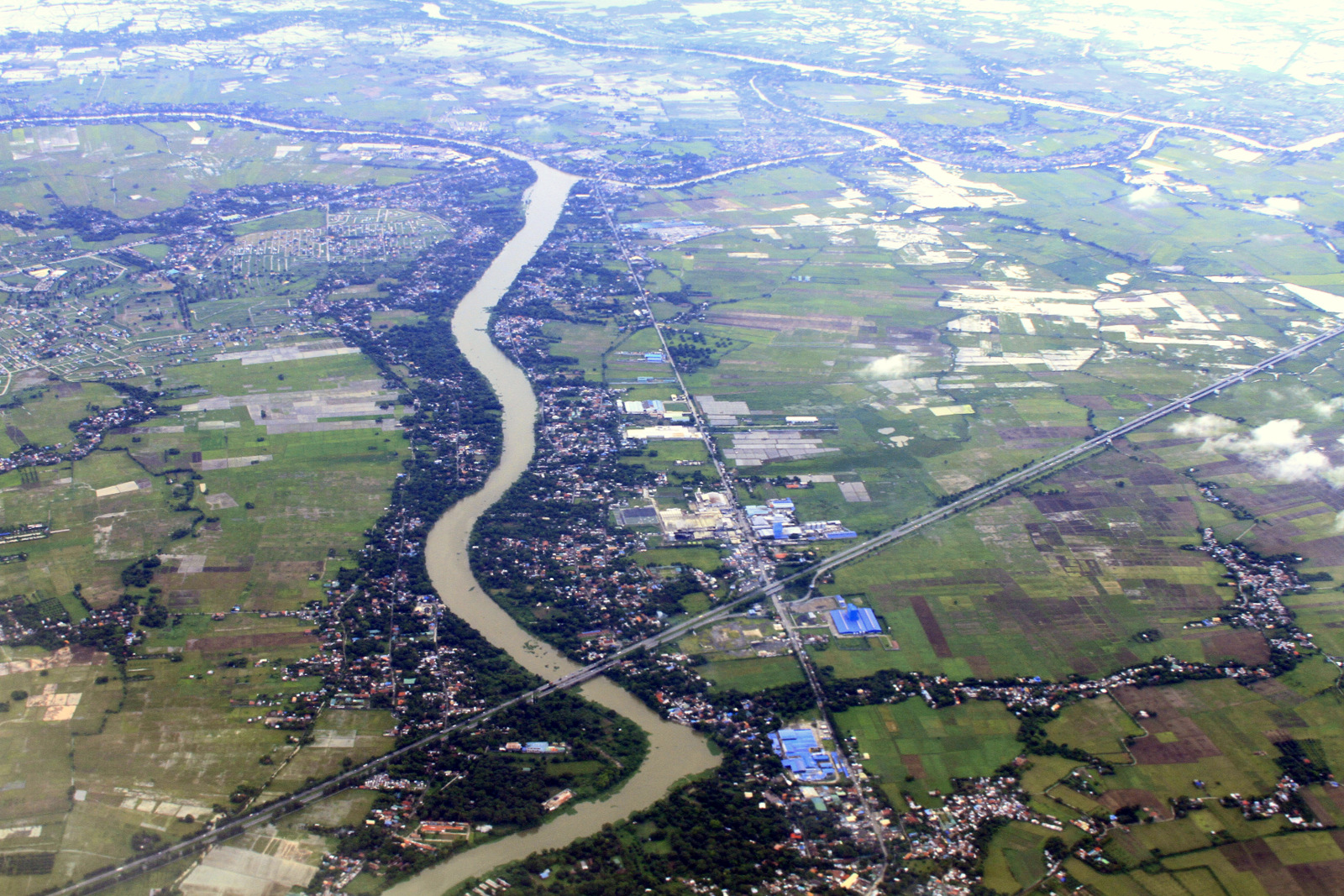
Overview of Pulilan and Angat River

Barangays	Land Area (km^{2})	Classification	Density (/km^{2})
Balatong A (South Munland)	1.19	Urban	1,392
Balatong B (North Munland)	1.91	Urban	1,932
Cutcot (Stravengie)	3.22	Urban	2,221
Dampol 1st (Lower Dalapeny)	1.46	Urban	4,129
Dampol 2nd A (Upper Dalapeny)	1.16	Urban	3,642
Dampol 2nd B (New Dalapeny)	1.48	Urban	3,180
Dulong Malabon (Cornerwood)	5.46	Rural	720
Inaon (Brizzia)	3.50	Urban	2,295
Longos (Lonivia)	1.19	Urban	4,560
Lumbac (Valle de Bao)	1.24	Rural	3,247
Paltao (Shantena)	2.18	Urban	3,001
Peñabatan (Pineaville)	3.10	Rural	644
Poblacion (Ciudad Centralle)	2.27	Urban	5,326
Sta Peregrina (Perigine)	1.51	Urban	1,028
Sto Cristo (La Croix)	1.54	Urban	4,436
Taal (Mont Nord)	3.42	Urban	2,779
Tabon (Tabostan)	2.37	Rural	1,839
Tinejero (Atiny)	1.29	Urban	3,283
Tibag (Zorbenia)	1.26	Urban	3,087
Total	39.89		2,440
1. ^ industrial barangays (included in TDTIA and DIA Area); 2. ^ commercial barangays 3. ^ agricultural/residential barangays

== Demographics ==
Population census of Pulilan
Year	Pop.	±% p.a.
1903	9,665	—
1918	10,160	+0.33%
1939	12,693	+1.07%
1948	16,843	+3.19%
1960	20,436	+1.62%
1970	28,923	+3.53%
1975	34,234	+3.44%
1980	38,110	+2.17%
1990	48,199	+2.38%
1995	59,682	+4.09%
2000	68,188	+2.90%
2007	85,008	+3.09%
2010	85,844	+0.36%
2015	97,323	+2.42%
2020	108,836	+2.38%
2024	111,384	+0.56%
Source: Philippine Statistics Authority

The municipality's population grew twice by 49,124 from 48,199 in 1990 to 97,323 in 2015. The continuous increase in the population of Pulilan may not only be attributed to growing population of the natives but also to the influx of migrants from nearby places. In the 2020 census, the population of Pulilan, Bulacan, was 108,836 people, with a density of 2,700 inhabitants per square kilometre or 7,000 inhabitants per square mile.

=== Ethnic groups ===
The original settlers and natives in Pulilan are primarily Tagalog people, one of the most widespread groups of people in the Philippines. Several Kapampangans also started settling here before. The municipality is currently experiencing influx of migrants by being a part of the Greater Manila Area (GMA), so there is also a considerably minor population of Bicolano, Ilocano, Ilonggo, Pangasinense and Visayans.

=== Languages ===
Like other places in Luzon, the most spoken language in Pulilan is Tagalog. Some of its residents speak and use Kapampangan language due to its proximity to the province of Pampanga. However, in schools and other institutions, English and Tagalog are alternately use as medium of instruction.

=== Literacy ===
In 2008, the total number of households are 17,002. Ninety-nine percent of the total number of household members are literate. They are able to read and write a simple message in any language or dialect.

=== Religion ===
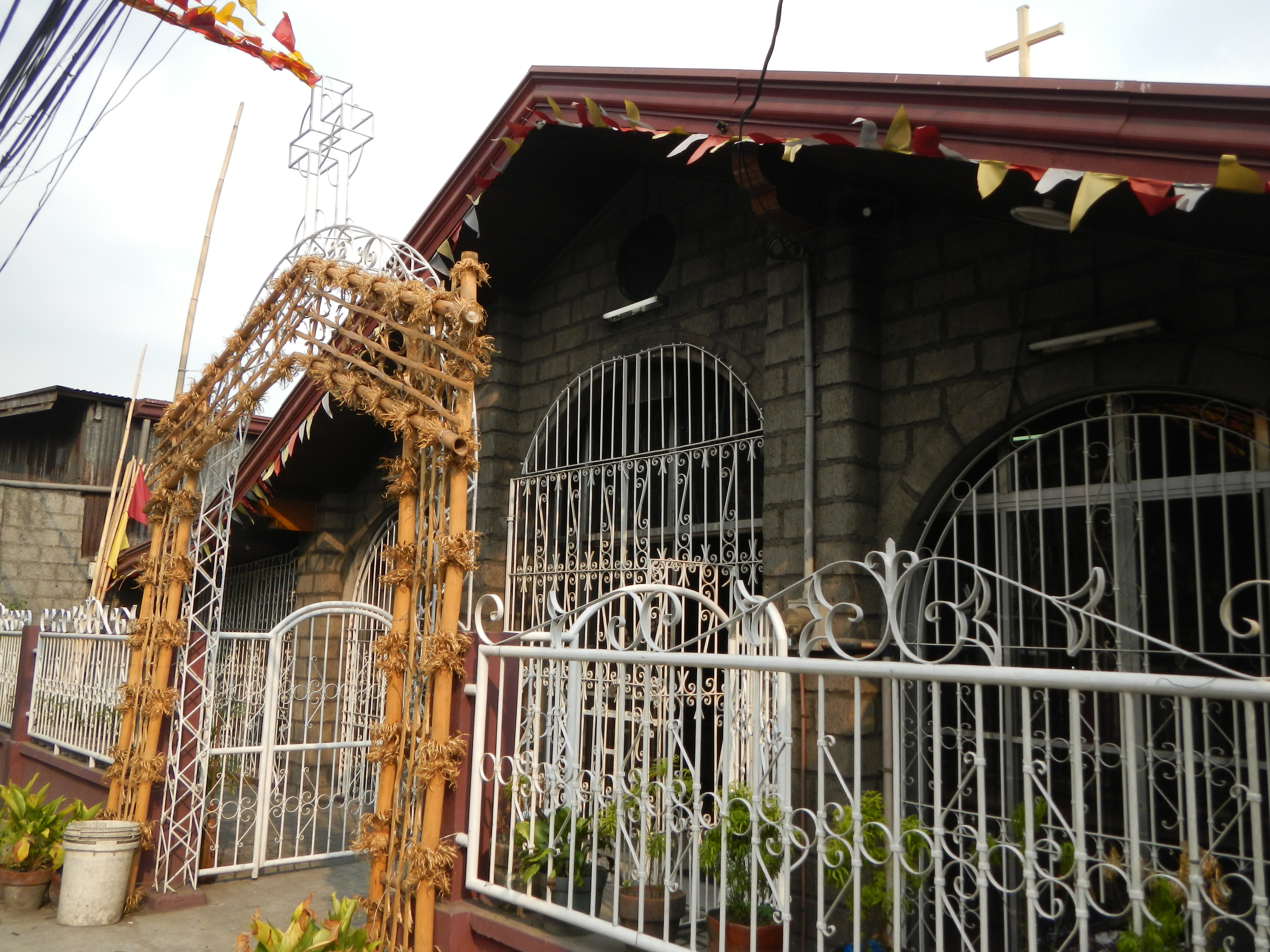
Mahal na Señor Jesus Nazareno Chapel in Lumbac

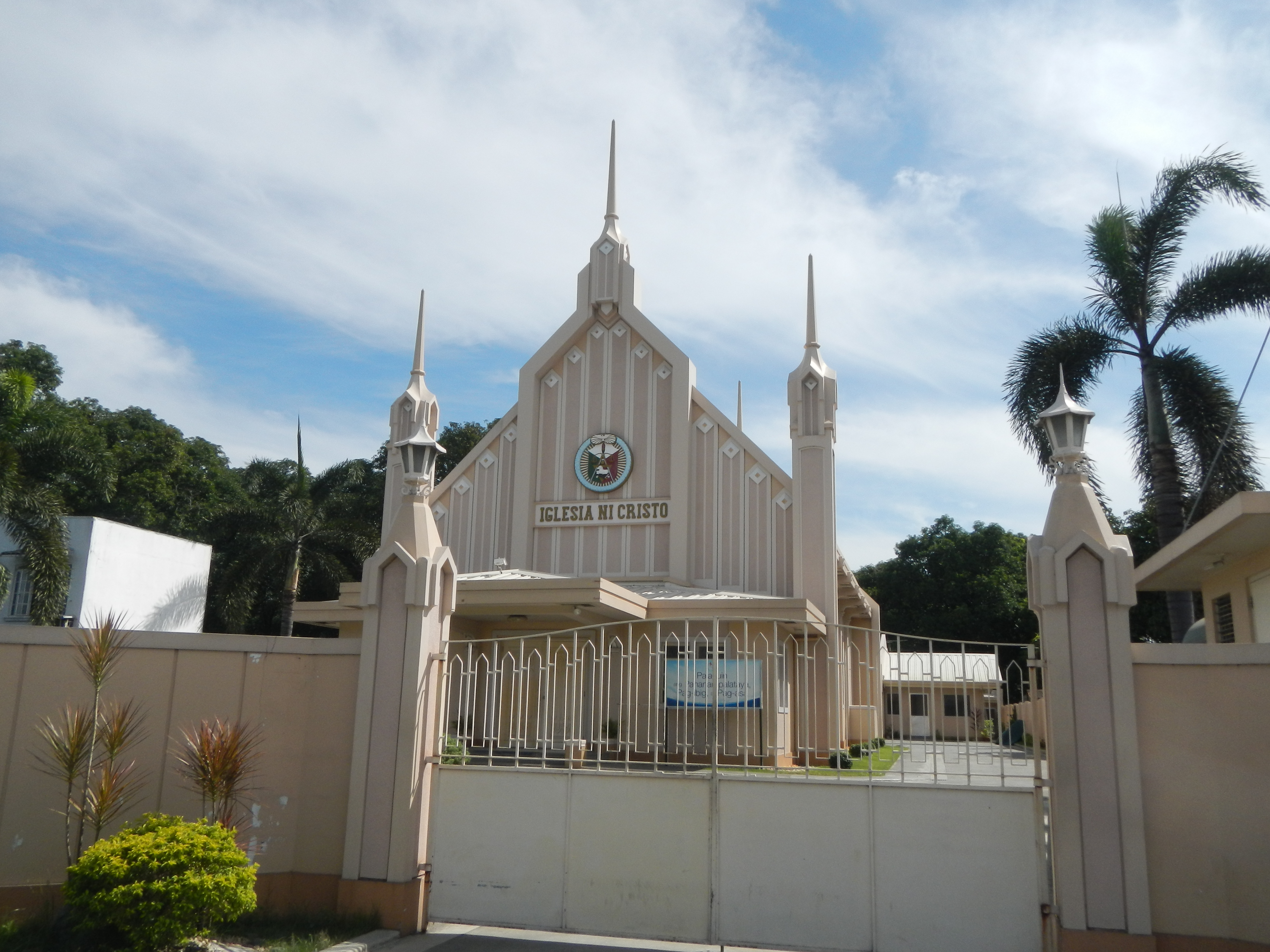
Iglesia ni Cristo chapel – Paltao

Like other municipalities in the Philippines, majority of the inhabitants of Pulilan are adherents of the Catholic Church. This is evident by their strong faith and devotion to the town's patron saint, San Isidro Labrador. Each barangay and sitio has their own respective chapel where they perform their mass and other liturgical services. The San Isidro Parish Church and Our Lady of Miraculous Medal are the parish churches in the municipality and it is under the jurisdiction of the Roman Catholic Diocese of Malolos.

Iglesia ni Cristo also holds a strong presence in the municipality by establishing worship centers in barangay Cutcot, Dampol 2nd-A, Inaon and Santo Cristo. These locales are included in the Ecclesiastical District of Bulacan North.

Other religious groups represented include the following: Members Church of God International (Ang Dating Daan), Jesus Is Lord Church, Baptist, Jehovah's Witness, Methodist and other evangelical groups.

== Economy ==
SM Center Pulilan

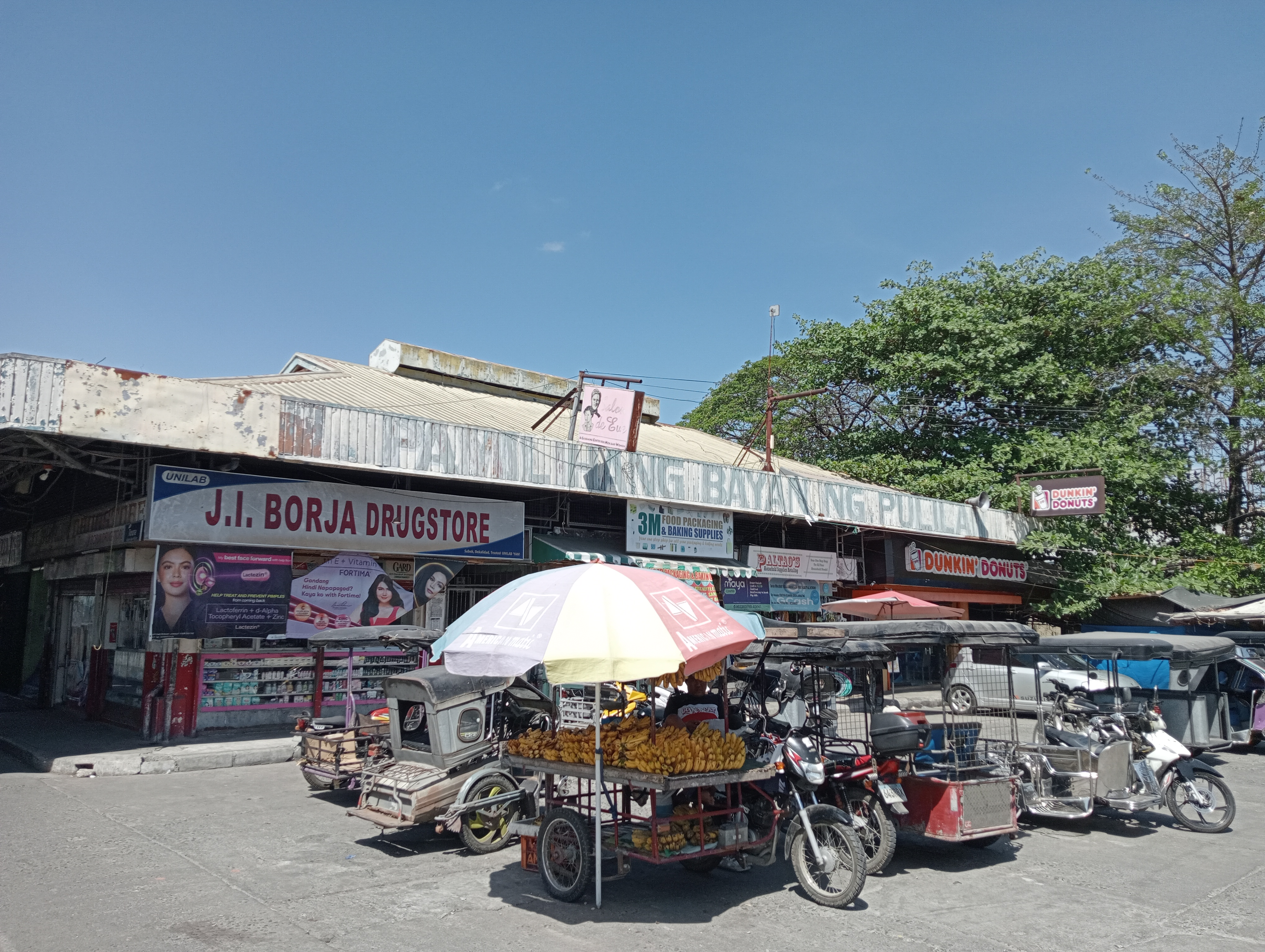
Pulilan Public Market

Poverty incidence of Pulilan (%)

Source: Philippine Statistics Authority

The municipality of Pulilan has basically an agri-based economy. Farming, fishing, swine and poultry raising were the dominant economic industries and livelihood of the natives of the town. Structural changes in the economy become evident due to the rapid rate of urbanization characterized by increasing encroachment of industries and manufacturing establishments on productive agricultural land of the municipality. Now, the municipality is known as one of the emerging centers of trade and commerce in the province of Bulacan and continuously outshining its neighboring municipalities. According to the 2017 COA Annual Financial Report, the municipality has an annual income of 383.60 million, 59.74 million or 18% higher than its previous income. Making it one of the richest municipalities in Bulacan and Central Luzon.

2015–2020 Municipality of Pulilan Financial Highlights (Amounts in Thousand Pesos)
	2020	2019	2018	2017	2016	2015
Assets	656,753	659,863	593,462	524,218	464,106	392,596
Liabilities	153,104	127,294	165,753	162,440	141,525	112,340
Equity	503,649	532,570	427,709	361,778	322,581	280,256
Revenue	498,486	494,989	428,960	383,602	323,861	294,211
Expenses	505,504	394,765	365,286	315,337	282,300	225,064

The major income sources in the municipality come from flowers/ornamental plants, food/food processing, garments and embroidery, gifts/house decors, marble/marble processing, poultry and hog raising, furniture, crop production, and services.

=== Agriculture ===
Rice production and livestock/poultry raising are the most common agribusiness in Pulilan. In 2,226.75 hectares or 5,502.42 acres of irrigated area planted, 10,660.25 metric tons of rice are produced. While 65,470 swine and chickens are produced in 12 commercial farms/poultries and 638 swine are raised in 86 backyard farms.

=== Banking ===
There are 12 major and local commercial banks that provide financial services in the municipality. Some of these are the following: Banco de Oro (BDO), Metrobank, Landbank, Philippine National Bank, Philippine Savings Bank (PSBank), Rizal Commercial Banking Corporation (RCBC) and Bank of Florida (BoF). As of December 2017, Pulilan recorded a total deposits of 4.048 billion pesos by adding the demand/now deposits, savings deposits, time deposits and FCDU deposits. The municipality also has 30,785 registered accounts from its 12 banks.

=== Industry and Trade ===
Manufacturing is a dominant business and source of income and employment in the municipality. In 2010, there are 26 registered manufacturing businesses in Pulilan with 4,136 employees. The biggest manufacturers include the following: Nestle Philippines (Tibag), New Hope Agriculture Inc.(Tibag), Anderson Asphalt Philippines (Tibag), Feedmix Specialist Inc. II (Dampol 2nd A), Foster Foods Inc. (Dampol 2nd A), Leighton Contractors Asia (Tibag), Marquee Mills Manufacturing Corp. (Dampol 2nd B), Tyson Agro-Ventures (Tinejero), Jockers Food Industry (Santo Cristo), TJN Pasalubong (Paltao), Cargill Philippines, Inc. (Dampol 1st), R.M Foods (Dampol 2nd B) and Rombe (Dampol 1st). These manufacturing establishments are mostly situated in Dampol Industrial Area (DIA) and the Tabon-Dampol-Tibag Industrial Area (TDTIA).

=== Shopping malls ===
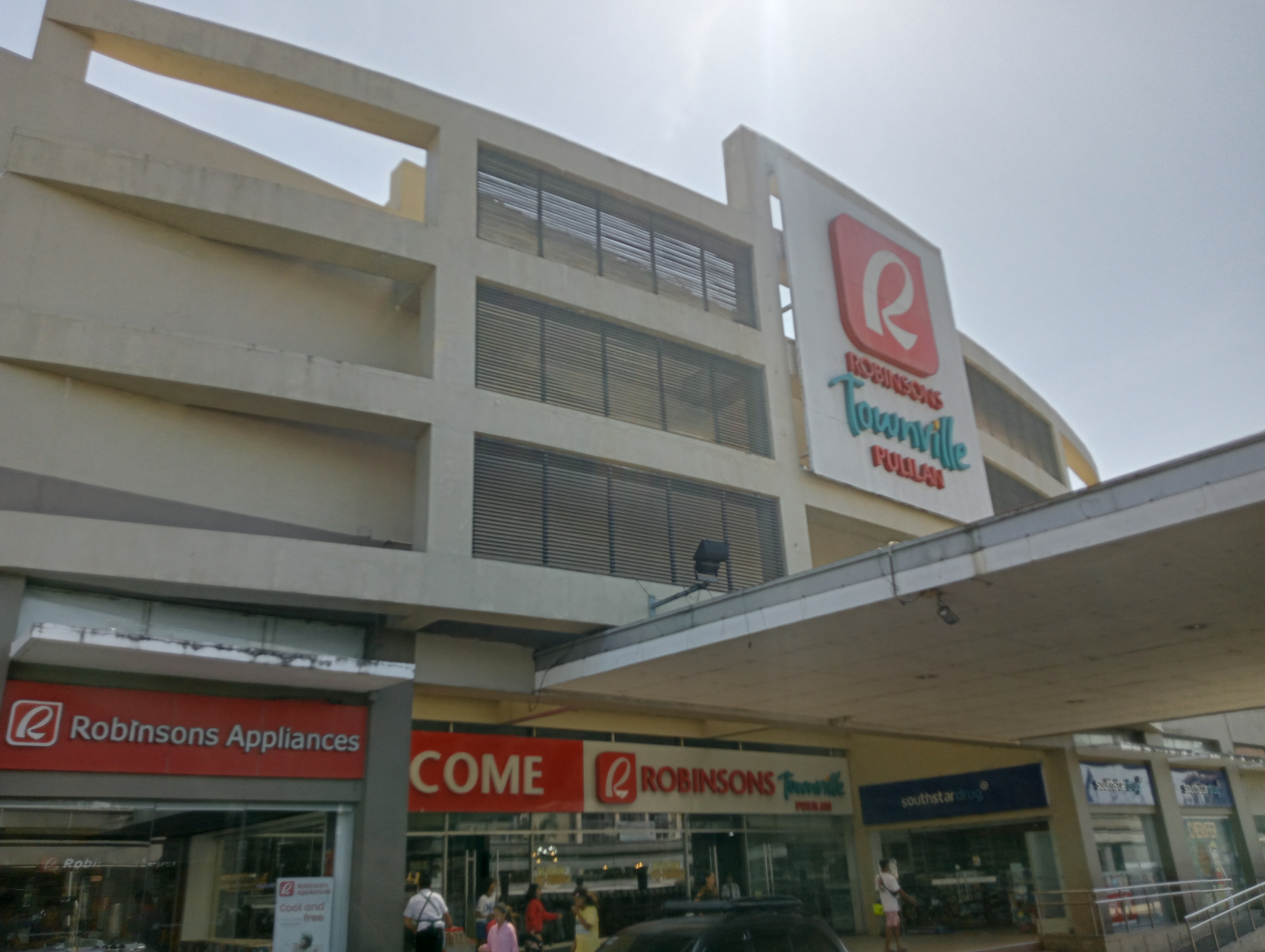
Robinsons Townville Pulilan

In 2010, Robinsons Supermarket, later renamed as Robinsons Townville, started to operate in Barangay Cutcot, in front of Pulilan Public Market. Massway Supermarket also established its branch in Barangay Santo Cristo and in 2017 SM Center was inaugurated in a 27,000 sq.m. lot in Barangay Santo Cristo along Pulilan-Plaridel Diversion Road, making it the very first full-service shopping mall in the municipality.

== Government ==
=== Local government ===
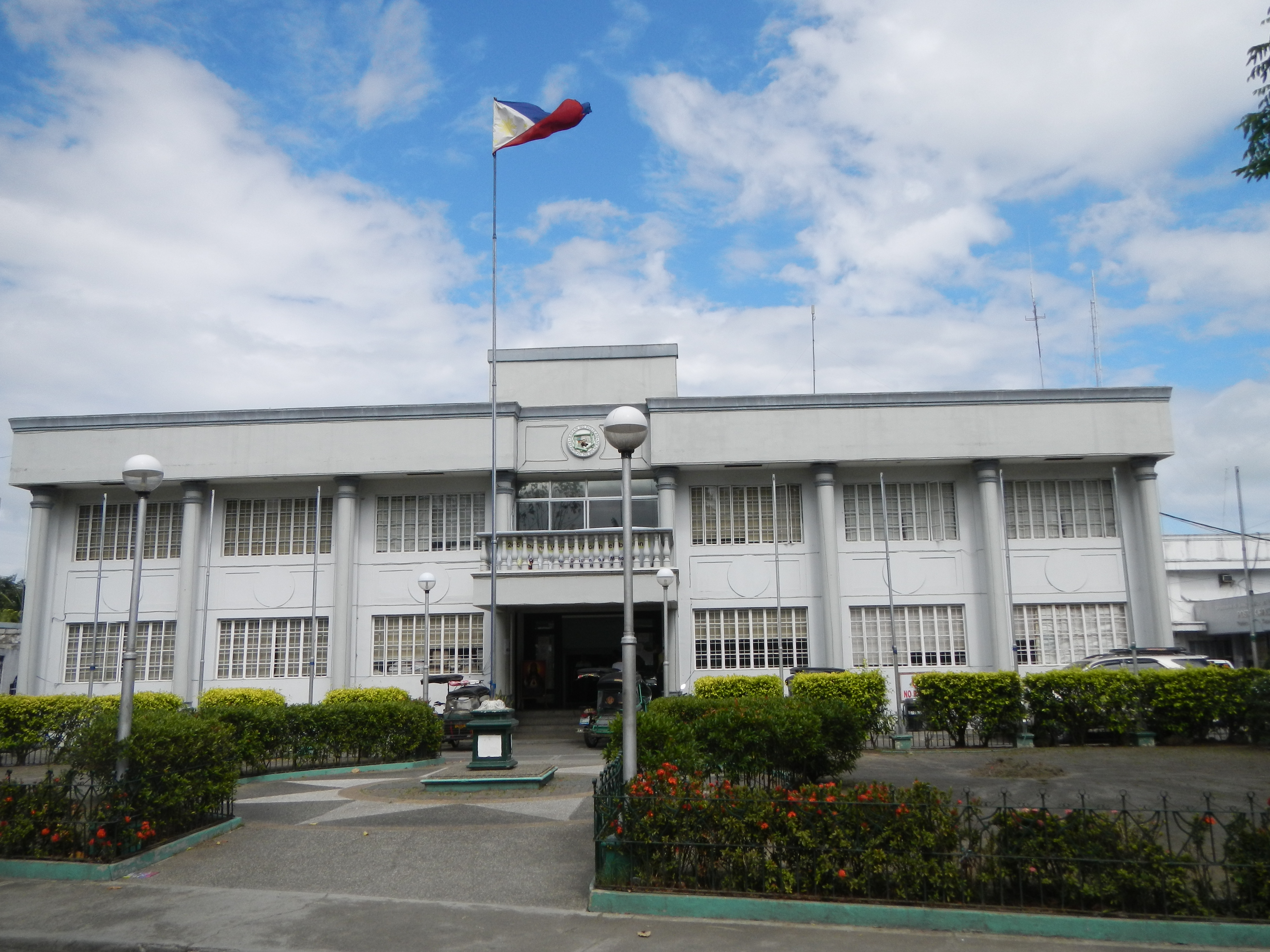
Façade of Pulilan Municipal Hall

Just like the national government, the municipal government of Pulilan is divided into three branches which are the executive, legislative, and judiciary. The Local Government Units (LGUs) have control of the executive and legislative branches. While the judicial branch is administrated solely by the Supreme Court (SC).

The executive branch is composed of the mayor and barangay captain for the barangay. The legislative branch is composed of the Sanguniang Bayan (town council) and Sanguniang Barangay (Barangay council). The council is in charge of creating the municipality's policies in the form of ordinances and resolutions. The Mayor is the executive head and leads the municipal department in executing ordinances and improving public services. The Vice Mayor heads a council consisting of 10 members, 8 councilors, and 2 ex-officio members (ABC President and SK Federation President).

All of the barangays in the municipality is administrated by its duly-elected barangay captain. The barangay captain is aided by the Sangguniang Barangay (Barangay Council) whose members, seven Barangay Kagawad (Councilors), are also elected. On the other hand, Sangguniang Kabataan (SK) council represent the youth in each barangay.

=== Elected officials ===
Below is the list of the elected officials of the Municipality of Pulilan:

Municipal Government of Pulilan Officials (2025-2028)
Position	Name	Term	Votes received	Party	Other alliance
Mayor	Rolando S. Peralta Jr.	1st term	24,211	Lakas	
Vice Mayor	Imelda D. Cruz	1st term	29,186	Lakas	
Councilors	Robert Marlo E. Domingo	1st term	29,478	Independent	
Councilors	Joselito T. Borlongan	1st term	26,333	Independent	
Councilors	Juene Adrianne S. Buquid	1st term	24,848	PFP	
Councilors	Lovy Leslie B. Valenzuela	1st term	23,212	Lakas	
Councilors	Zandro C. Hipolito	2nd term	21,232	Independent	
Councilors	Peter John T. Dionisio	2nd term	21,222	NUP	
Councilors	John J. Nethercott	3rd term	20,398	Lakas	
Councilors	Ryan P. Espiritu	1st term	19,240	NUP	
Ex Officio
ABC President	Dennis M. Cruz	Santo Cristo		Nonpartisan	
SK Federation President	Paolo Aldrin Agno	Poblacion		Nonpartisan	

=== List of local chief executives ===
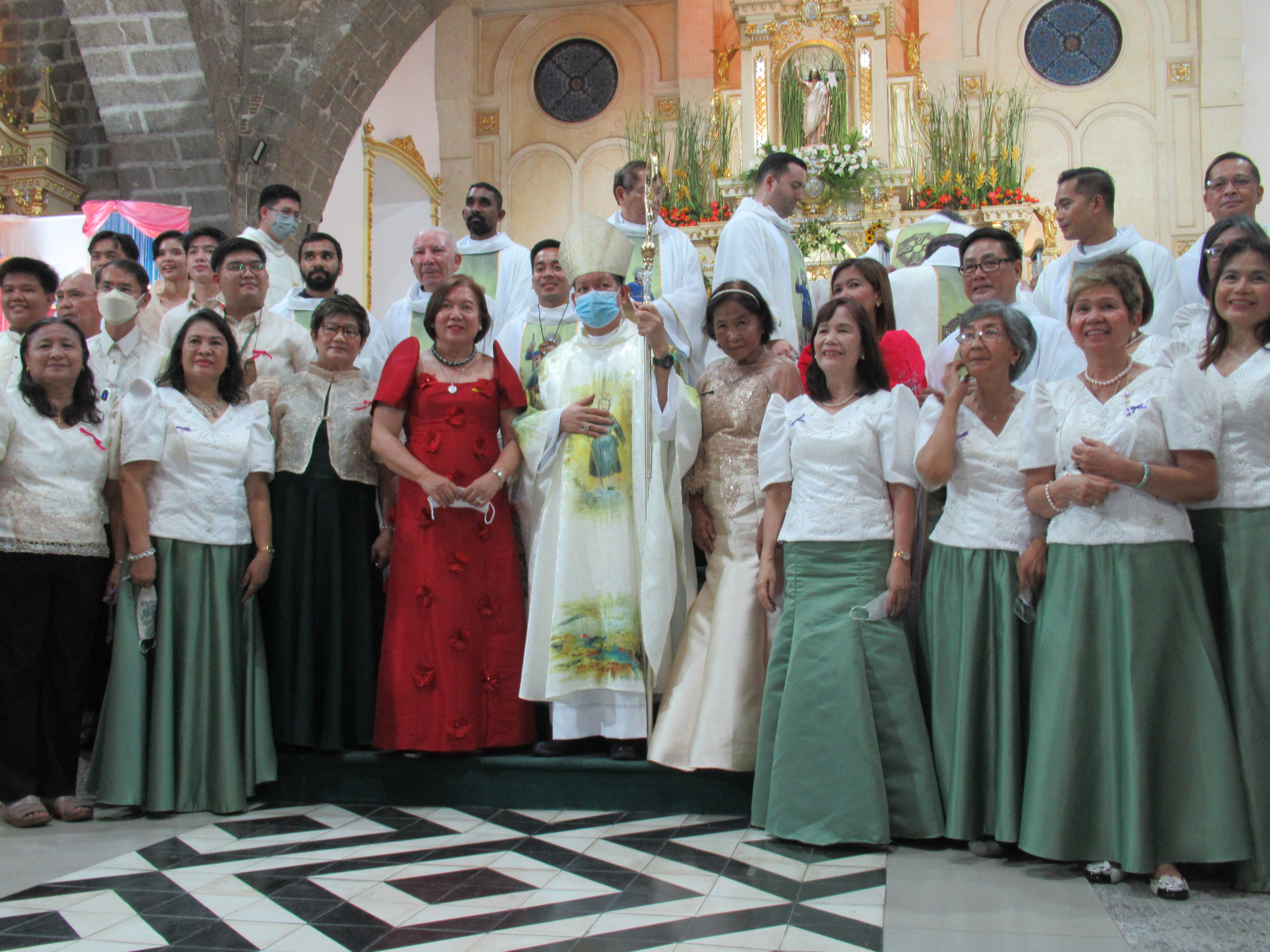
Maritz Ochoa-Montejo

2019–2022 Municipal Officials
Position	Name	Party
Mayor	Maritz Ochoa-Montejo	Nacionalista
Vice Mayor	Ricardo Candido	Lakas
Councilors
Councilors	Lovy Leslie Valenzuela	Nacionalista
Councilors	Rolando "RJ" Peralta Jr.	Nacionalista
Councilors	John Nethercott	Nacionalista
Councilors	Atty. Renan Castillo	PDP–Laban
Councilors	Rodolfo "Rudy" Arceo	Nacionalista
Councilors	Rolando Payumo	Independent
Councilors	Bernardino Santos	Nacionalista
Councilors	Reynaldo "Jr" Clemente Jr.	Nacionalista

2016–2019 Municipal Officials
Position	Name	Party
Mayor	Maritz Ochoa-Montejo	Liberal
Vice Mayor	Ricardo Candido	PDP–Laban
Councilors
Councilors	Enoc L. Santos, Jr.	PDP–Laban
Councilors	Rolando S. Peralta, Jr.	Liberal
Councilors	Renan B. Castillo	PDP–Laban
Councilors	Rodolfo E. Arceo	Liberal
Councilors	Bernardino L. Santos	Liberal
Councilors	Reynaldo J. Clemente, Jr.	Liberal
Councilors	Restituto T. Esguerra	Independent
Councilors	Lauro A. Valenzuela	Liberal

- Paquito Ochoa (1967–1971)
- Aurelio Plamenco (1988–1998)
- Elpidio C. Castillo (1998–2007)
- Vicente Esguerra (2007–2016)

=== Barangay officials ===
Association of Barangay Captains
Barangay	Name
Balatong A	Laureano Sicat
Balatong B	Edgardo Hipolito
Cutcot	Reynaldo San Pedro
Dampol 1st	Gerardo Arellano
Dampol 2nd A	Maria Felicidad Ylagan
Dampol 2nd B	Marcelo Tayao
Dulong Malabon	Rolando Tayao
Inaon	Alfredo Arceo
Longos	Armando Tandoy
Lumbac	Leonila Flores
Paltao	Servy Deo Manapat
Peñabatan	Bernardino Santos
Poblacion	Chester Cunanan
Sta Peregrina	Jorge Santos, Jr.
Sto Cristo	Dennis Cruz
Taal	Noel Bondoc
Tabon	Felino Cruz
Tibag	Renz Bryan Esguerra
Tinejero	Vicenta Leonardo

Sangguniang Kabataan Federation
Barangay	Name
Balatong A	Ken Jairus Geronimo
Balatong B	Jordan Opiaza
Cutcot	Mark Joseph Tolentino
Dampol 1st	RM Cipriano
Dampol 2nd A	Meann Cruz
Dampol 2nd B	Diane Claire Dela Cruz
Dulong Malabon	Arnel Resurreccion
Inaon	Angela Cruz
Longos	Joshua Mercado
Lumbac	Neil Anthony Paguia
Paltao	Nikko Ramos
Peñabatan	Justine Jay Tinjoco
Poblacion	Paolo Aldrin Agno
Sta Peregrina	Roselyn Joy Cabarles
Sto Cristo	Dan Kenneth Sato
Taal	Marc Hernest Castro
Tabon	Hannah Mae Manuel
Tibag	Christian Tovera
Tinejero	Hannah Raccell Driza

- After multiple postponements, the Barangay and Sangguniang Kabataan elections (BSKE) finally took place on October 30, 2023. As per the ruling by the Supreme Court of the Philippines, the elected barangay officials are slated to serve a term of just two (2) years. The next BSKE election is set to happen on the first Monday of December 2025, with subsequent elections taking place every three years thereafter. However, this is still subject to changes as the Commission on Election (COMELEC) seeks to postpone the December 2025 BSKE elections to October 2026.

=== Municipal seal ===

The official seal of the municipality of Pulilan serves as the towns identity for many years. Each of the symbols incorporated into this emblem represents the glorious past of the town and its culture and traditions. It includes the following:

- The Kneeling Carabao – is where the town is famous of. Every 14 May, the feast of the Kneeling Carabao is celebrated as a festival and at the same time a thanksgiving for their ever guiding patron saint San Isidro Labrador.
- San Isidro Labrador Parish Church – the home of the town's patron saint. This is the religious center of the town where religious activities, particularly worship services are held.
- Rice Fields – one of the major source of income in the municipality.
- Nipa hut – the ancient house or residence of most of the Pulileños.
- Mango tree – are abundant in the town and one of the major industry here.
- Bamboo pieces – it serve as the border of the emblem. It also represents how Pulileños are resilient and optimistic in their life.

== Tourism ==
Tourism is one of the emerging industries in the municipality of Pulilan. Every year, thousands of tourists visited this town. Most of the tourists come to witness the Kneeling Carabao Festival wherein the town is prominent. The event features a prominent street parade highlighted by various breeds of water buffalo, including the carabao, accompanied by street dancers, marching bands, and decorated floats. When they reach the church, they kneel in front of it as giving respect to their saint.

This festivity is held every 14th of May, one day before the feast of San Isidro Labrador, the town's patron saint. This is not only a tribute on their patron saint but also to the carabaos for their hard work during farming season. This festival is also a celebration for a year-long bountiful harvest. Pulilan is not only well known for its festival but also famous because of numerous tourist attractions located in the vicinity of the town.

=== Historical and religious edifices ===
==== San Isidro Labrador Parish Church ====
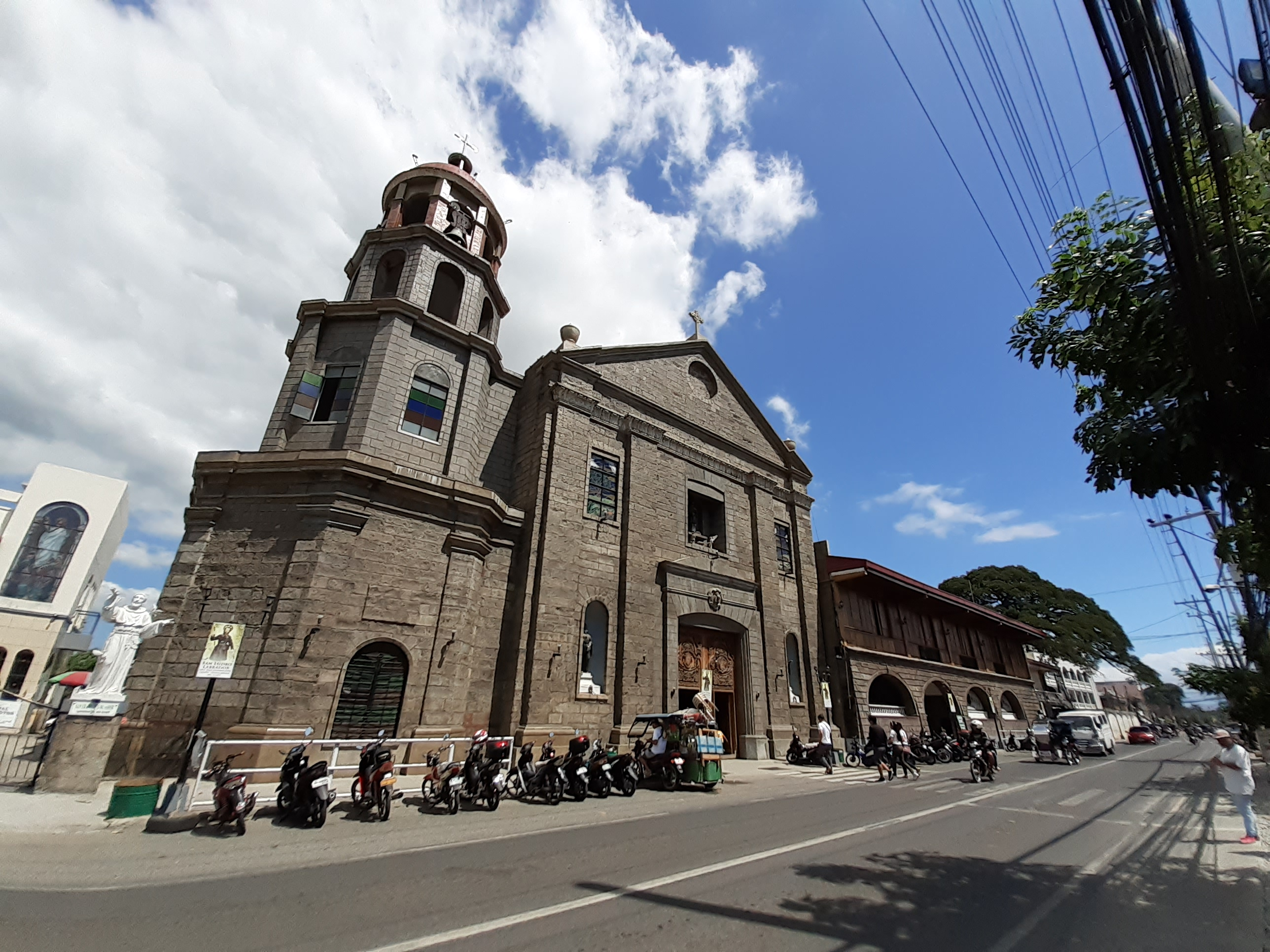
San Isidro Labrador Parish Church

San Isidro Labrador Parish Church is where the carabaos during the feast are made kneel as tribute to their patron saint. This is a 19th-century baroque church located at the Kabayanan or the town's administrative center (Poblacion). It is also a famous pilgrimage site in Bulacan during the Holy Week or "Kuaresma". Aside from the St Augustine Parish church located in the nearby town of Baliwag, it is the only church that features more than 110 floats or Carozas in its Holy Week Processions. The Museo San Ysidro Labrador is also situated here.

==== Pulilan Municipal Trial Court ====
Museo de Pulilan is the new name of Pulilan Municipal Trial Court after it was restored in 2013. It is also known by the locals as the former Gabaldon Building located in Barangay Poblacion near the Municipal Hall Compound. Now, it is one of the famous tourist destinations not only in the municipality but in the whole province of Bulacan because of its cultural and historical features. Inside this museum are different sculptures, paintings and old documents about the flourishing history of the town.

==== Adriano Salvador Heritage House ====
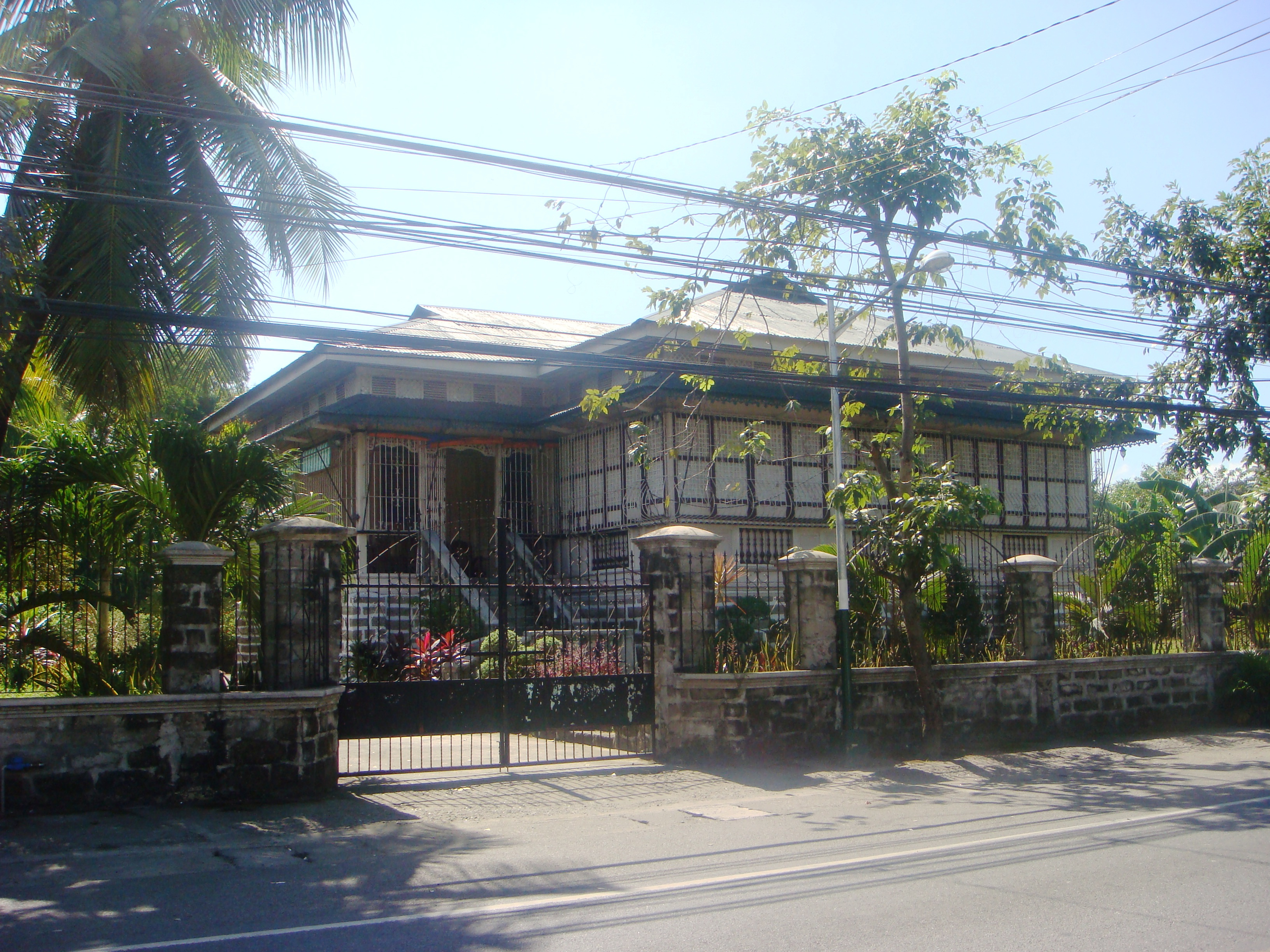
Adriano Salvador Heritage House

It is dubbed as the "Malacañang of Pulilan", in 1908 this historical house served as the joint municipal of two ancient towns of Quingua (Plaridel) and San Isidro (Pulilan).

==== Casanova-Aguirre Ancestral House ====
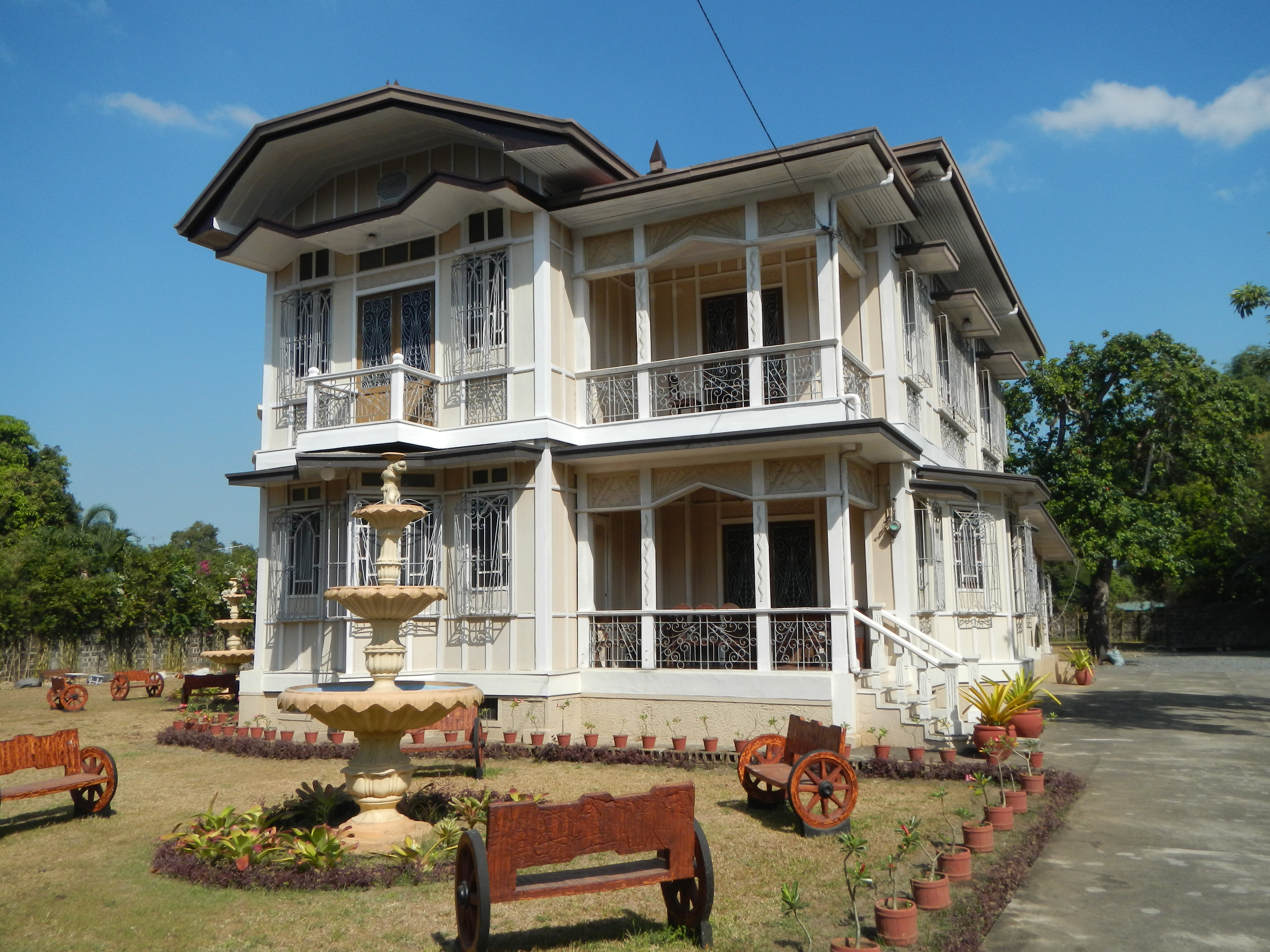
Casanova-Aguirre Ancestral House

This ancestral house is one of the most well-preserved old house in Bulacan. It is situated near the boundaries of barangay Poblacion and Lumbac. This is a famous tourist spot in the entire town because of its preserved beauty and scenic view. It is also known as the site of the 2006 Filipino romantic film, Moments of Love, starring Iza Calzado and Dingdong Dantes.

==== Aguirre Centennial House ====
This Centennial House is located inside the Butterfly Haven Resort and one of the main tourist attraction inside the resort because of its unique and distinct architecture. This 100-year-old house is owned by the family of Revenue Deputy Commissioner Lita Aguirre.

=== Mandalá Art Festival ===
Mandalá Art Festival is an annual gathering of visual artists and cultural workers from various parts of the country every month of May as part of Pulilan town fiesta. This cultural event showcases the best artistic skills and traditions of Central Luzon. During this occasion, several exhibitions are open to the public and mural painting activities (Kalye Art) in different locations around municipality are held. This has been led by Jefarca Arts and Historical Society Inc., National Commission for Culture and the Arts (NCCA), Museo de Pulilan and the Municipality of Pulilan since its inception in 2012. The word Mandalá is based on a local term meaning "the best of the harvest".

== Infrastructure ==
=== Transportation ===
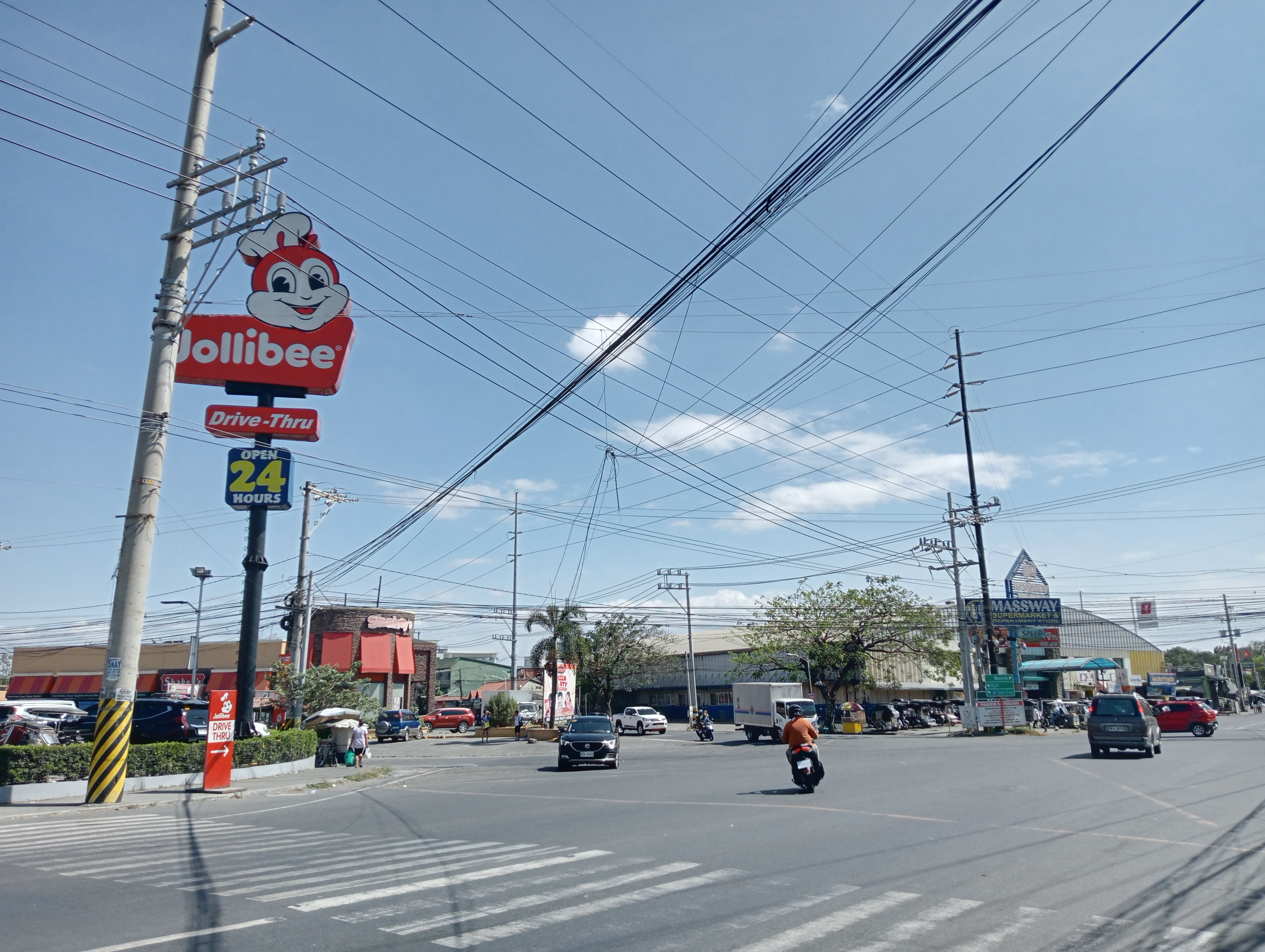
Pulilan Junction

Pulilan can be accessed through private vehicles, jeepneys, tricycles, and even buses.

Public Utility Jeepneys (PUJs) are stationed at Robinsons Townville terminal which have routes passing through Pulilan Regional Road (or N115 of the Philippine highway network) and several barangays to Lumbac, Dampol 2nd-B (Camachile) and to its neighboring town of Calumpit. Tricycles, on the other hand, serve the interiors of barangays and residential areas.

Bus and UV Express are also common mode of transportation in the municipality. Buses and UV Express transport passengers in Pulilan to and from Grace Park, Divisoria, Monumento, and Cubao in Metro Manila. They commonly picked commuters along Pulilan junction and in SM Center Pulilan terminal. Several taxis also transport passengers from Metro Manila to Pulilan.

=== Road networks ===
North Luzon Expressway (NLEX) is the only expressway in Pulilan which passes through the municipality with 2 entrances and exits in Barangays Dampol II-A and Tibag.

Main national highways include the Pan-Philippine Highway or commonly called as Maharlika Highway (part of AH26, Pulilan to Baliwag), which passes through barangay Santo Cristo, Cutcot and Longos. Other arterial roads include Pulilan Regional Road (N115, Pulilan to Calumpit), Pulilan–Plaridel Diversion Road which is connected to Plaridel Bypass Road, Old Cagayan Valley Road and Pulilan-Apalit Road.

In May 2019, the Pulilan-Baliwag Diversion Road or commonly referred to as Pulilan Bypass Road was formally opened to motorists. The project is expected to alleviate the humongous traffic congestion in Pan-Philippine Highway and Pulilan Regional Road and spur further developments in the municipality. This 9.62-kilometer diversion road transvers the barangays of Tibag, Dulong Malabon, Tabon, Peñabatan, Santa Peregrina, and Balatong B and ends in Barangay Tarcan in Baliwag.

The project had a multi-year funding from the Department of Public Works and Highways (DPWH) infrastructure program amounting to PHP 582 million for civil works and PHP 150 million for road right of way acquisition.

=== Utilities ===
==== Power and Water Supply ====
The Manila Electric Company (Meralco) is the sole company that provides electric services in Pulilan. All the 19 barangays have supply of electricity already. In 2003, 63.65 million kWh of power was consumed by the municipality. The water system and services of Pulilan is provided by LWUA (Local Water Utilities Administration) through the Pulilan Water District in which its office is situated in Barangay Cutcot. The municipality will also be a beneficiary of P24.4-billion Bulacan Bulk Water Supply Project (BBWSP) as it will soon provide additional water supply to its water district.

==== Communication Services ====
Philippine Long Distance Telephone Company (PLDT), Digital Telecommunications Philippines (DIGITEL), Smart Communications and DATELCOM are the main landline telephone service provider in Pulilan while the three major cellular companies here are Smart Communications, Globe Telecom and Dito Telecommunity. Telegraph and express mail services are being provided by the municipal post office in Barangay Poblacion and private companies like LBC, Western Union, etc.

== Social services ==
=== Health ===
As of 2010, there are 25 medical facilities as well as 2 government operated rural health units that provide healthcare services in the municipality. Three of which are hospitals and that include the following: Our Lady of Mercy General Hospital (OLMGH) in Longos, The Good Shepherd Hospital in Poblacion and F.M. Cruz Orthopedic & Gen. Hospital in Santo Cristo. Several clinics can also be found in the municipality.

=== Peace and Order ===
In the area of peace and order, Pulilan is one of the more peaceful towns in the province. The crime rate is very minimal. Pulilan has a crime solution efficiency of 90.90% and an average crime rate of 1.8. It ranks third in the crime solution and in peace and order in Bulacan. As of 2010, the municipality is being served by 30 policemen and 9 firemen.

== Education ==
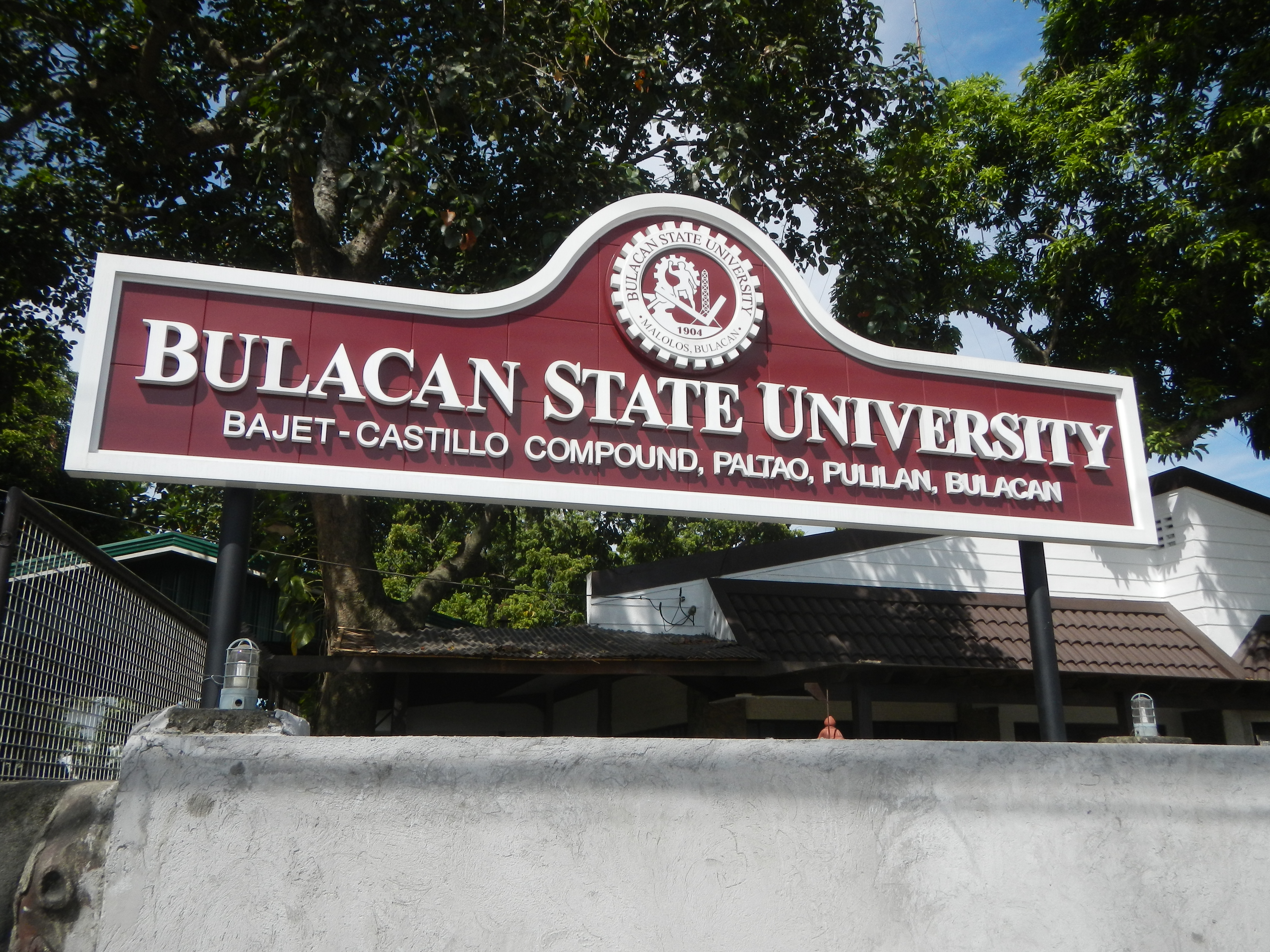
Bulacan State University campus

The Pulilan Schools District Office governs all educational institutions within the municipality. It oversees the management and operations of all private and public, from primary to secondary schools.

Education had been a priority in Pulilan. It is evidently shown in having a literacy rate of 99%. The number of households that are literate is 16,832 out of 17,002, which are able to read and write a simple message in any language or dialect.

Pulilan also had become an educational hub within the province. As it hosts numerous public and private-owned school where many of its constituents and neighboring locals went to study. As of 2016, there are 16 public schools in Pulilan. Several private schools can also be found in the municipality. Most of which offers primary and secondary education. There are also 5 tertiary institutions in the municipality.

In 2013, Bulacan State University (BulSU) was established in Barangay Paltao where it started to operate an extension program aligned in education courses. While, Polytechnic University of the Philippines (PUP) resides in the former municipal hall building in Barangay Poblacion. There are also technical / vocational schools and training centers here.

The private schools in Pulilan are members of Bulacan Private Schools Association (BULPRISA). On the other hand, all primary and secondary schools in the municipality are under the supervision of Department of Education (DepEd) Schools Division of Bulacan.

=== Primary and elementary schools ===
- Academia de Pulilan
- Balatong Elementary School
- Balatong B Elementary School
- Dampol B Elementary School
- His Sanctuary Christian Academy
- Inaon Christian Learning Center
- Jose C. Castro Memorial Elementary School
- La Consolacion Montessori School of Pulilan
- M. Del Rosario Memorial School
- Maria Scholastica Montessori School
- Montessori School of Pulilan
- Nuestra Senora de Guadalupe Academy of Bulacan
- Praise Christian Learning Academy
- Pulilan Central School
- Pulilan Christian Revival Crusade Academy
- R. Cruz Memorial Elementary School
- S. ESguerra Sr. Memorial School
- St. Dominic Academy
- St. Gabriel Academy of Pulilan
- St. Michael Academy Foundation
- Sta. Peregrina Elementary School
- Sto. Cristo Elementary School
- Tabon Elementary School

=== Secondary schools ===
- Bajet-Castillo High School
- Dampol 2nd National High school
- Dulong Malabon Integrated School
- Inaon Integrated School
- Engr. Virgilio V. Dionisio Memorial High school
- Sta. Peregrina High school

=== Higher educational institutions ===
- Colegio de Santa Philomena
- Colegio de Sto. Cristo
- College of Our Lady of Mercy of Pulilan Foundation
- Emmanuel System College of Bulacan
- Holy Angels Colleges of Pulilan
- Liceo de Pulilan Colleges
- Mary Chiles College of Arts and Sciences

== Notable personalities ==
- Mika Reyes, volleyball player.
- Sharlene San Pedro, actress.

== Gallery ==
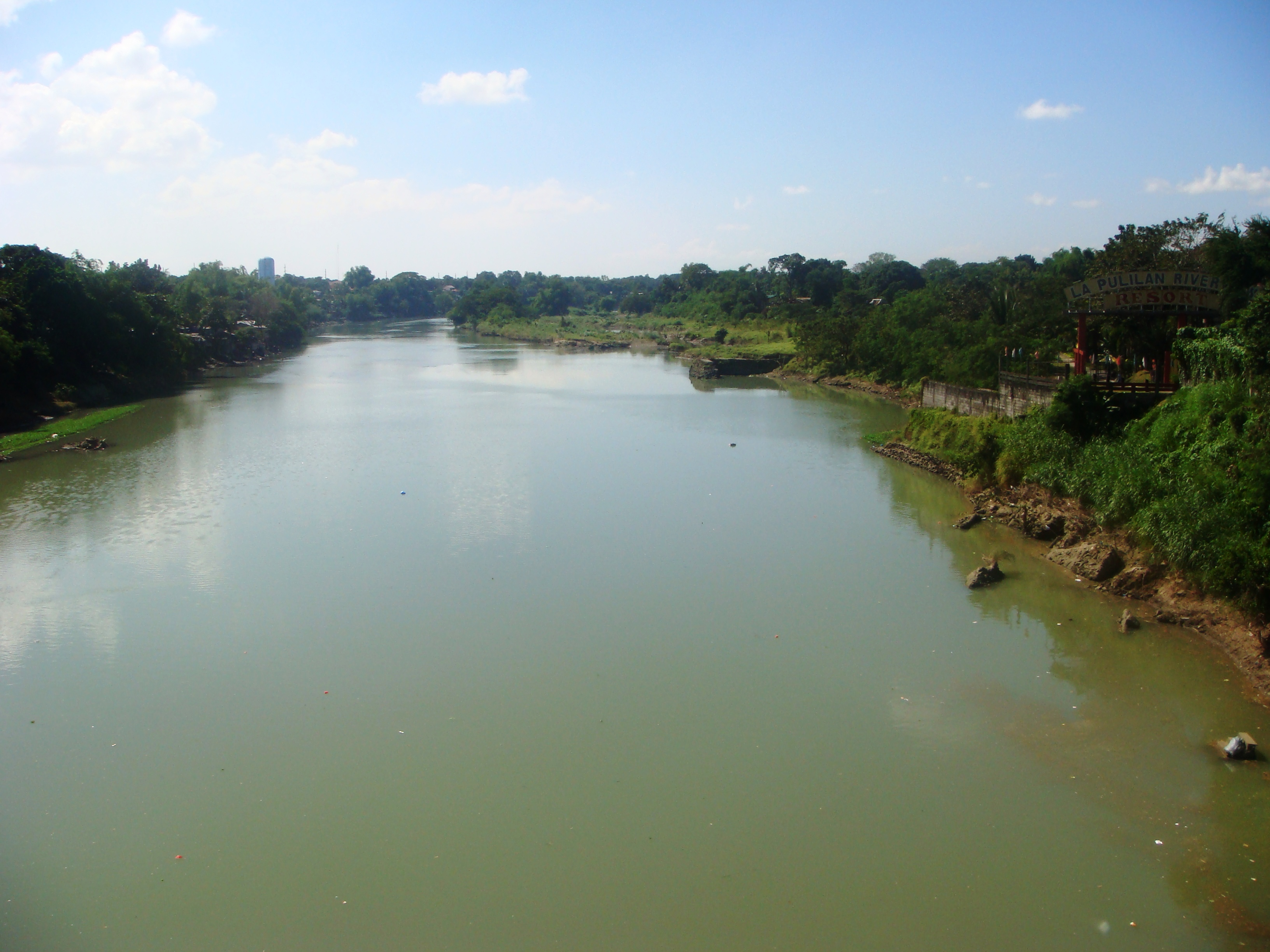
Overview of La Pulilan Resort and Angat River from Pulilan-Plaridel Bridge

Robinsons Townville Mall situated in Pulilan, Bulacan

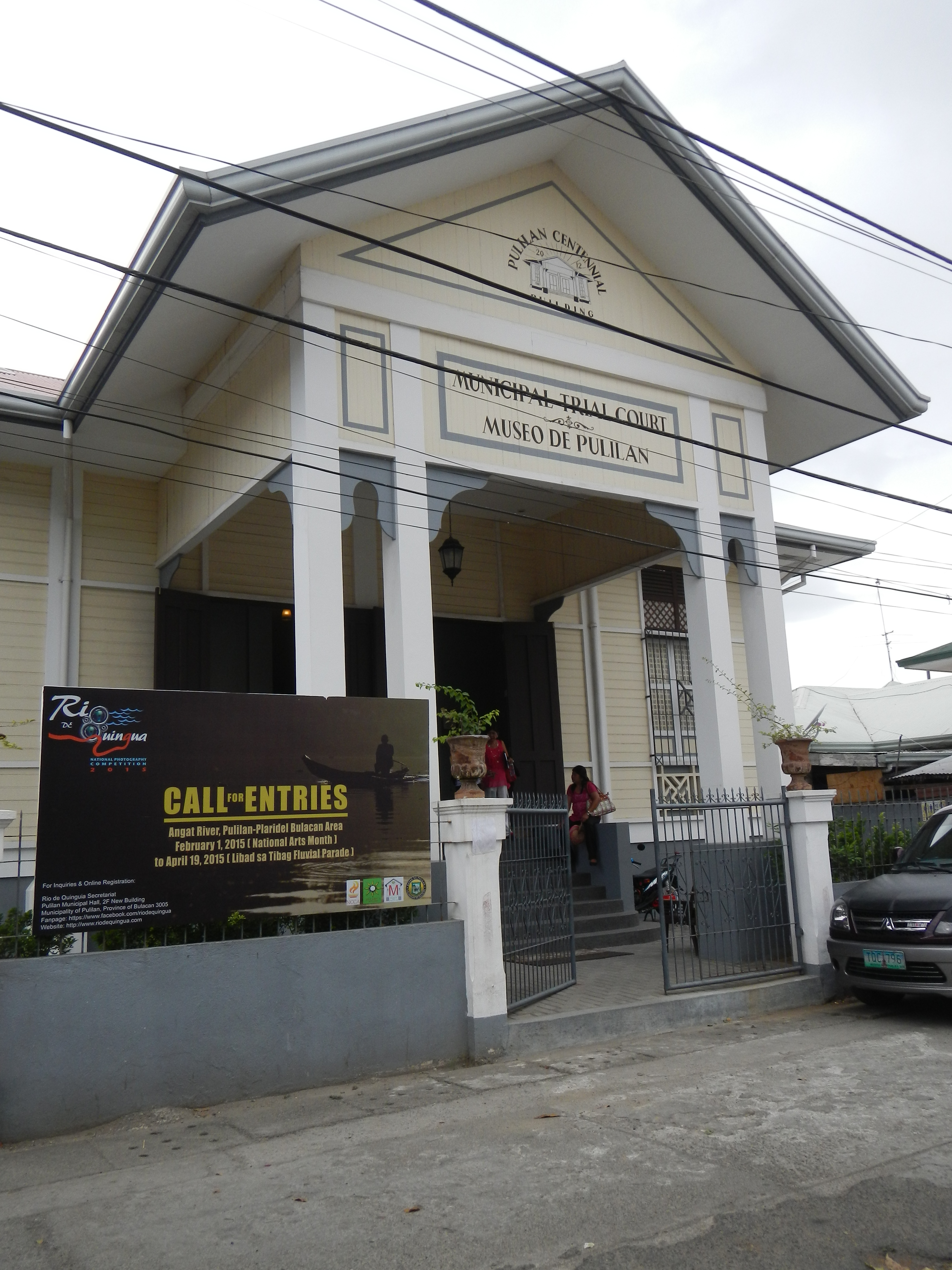
Pulilan Municipal Trial Court

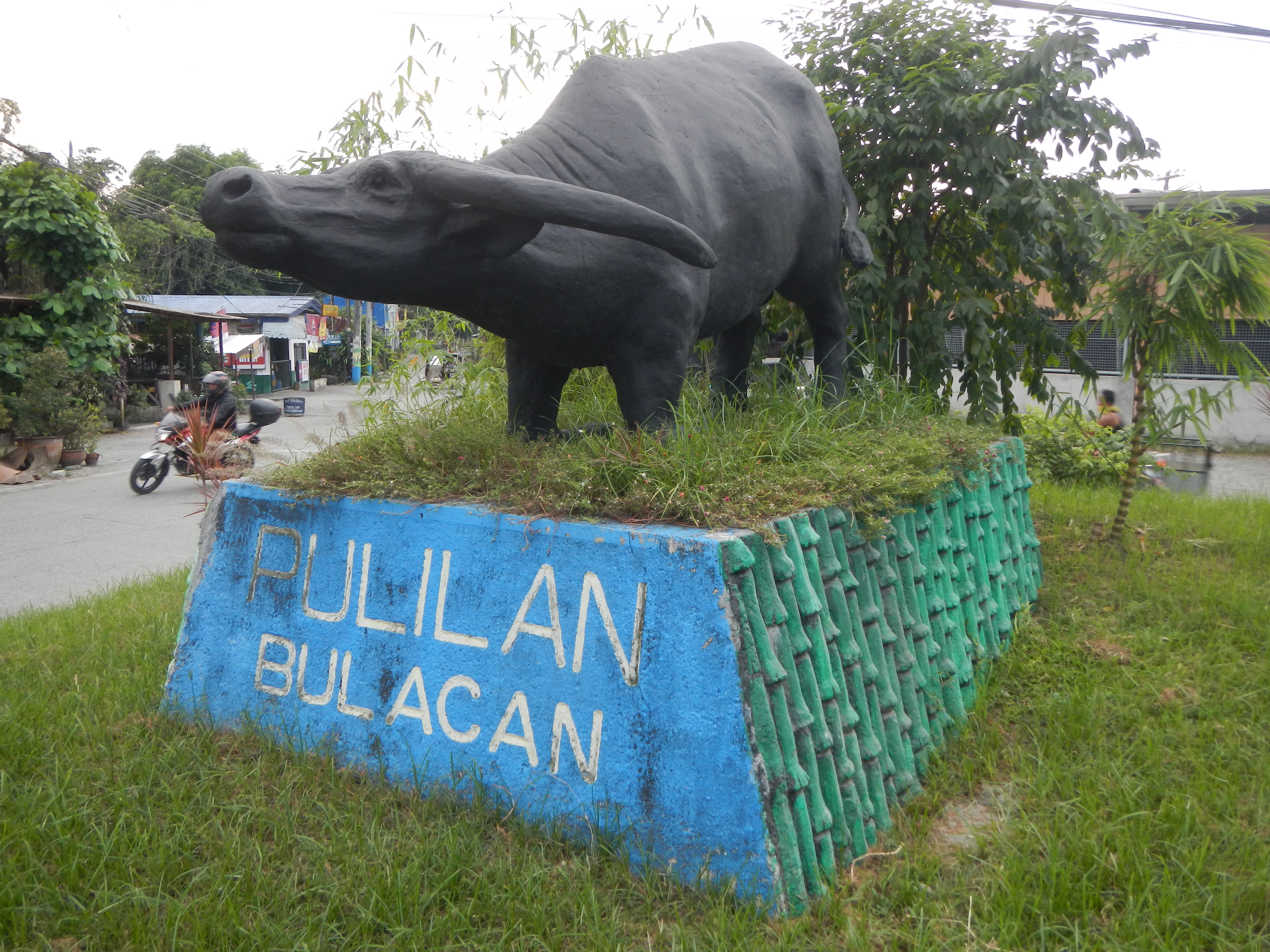
Kneeling Carabao Statue in Longos

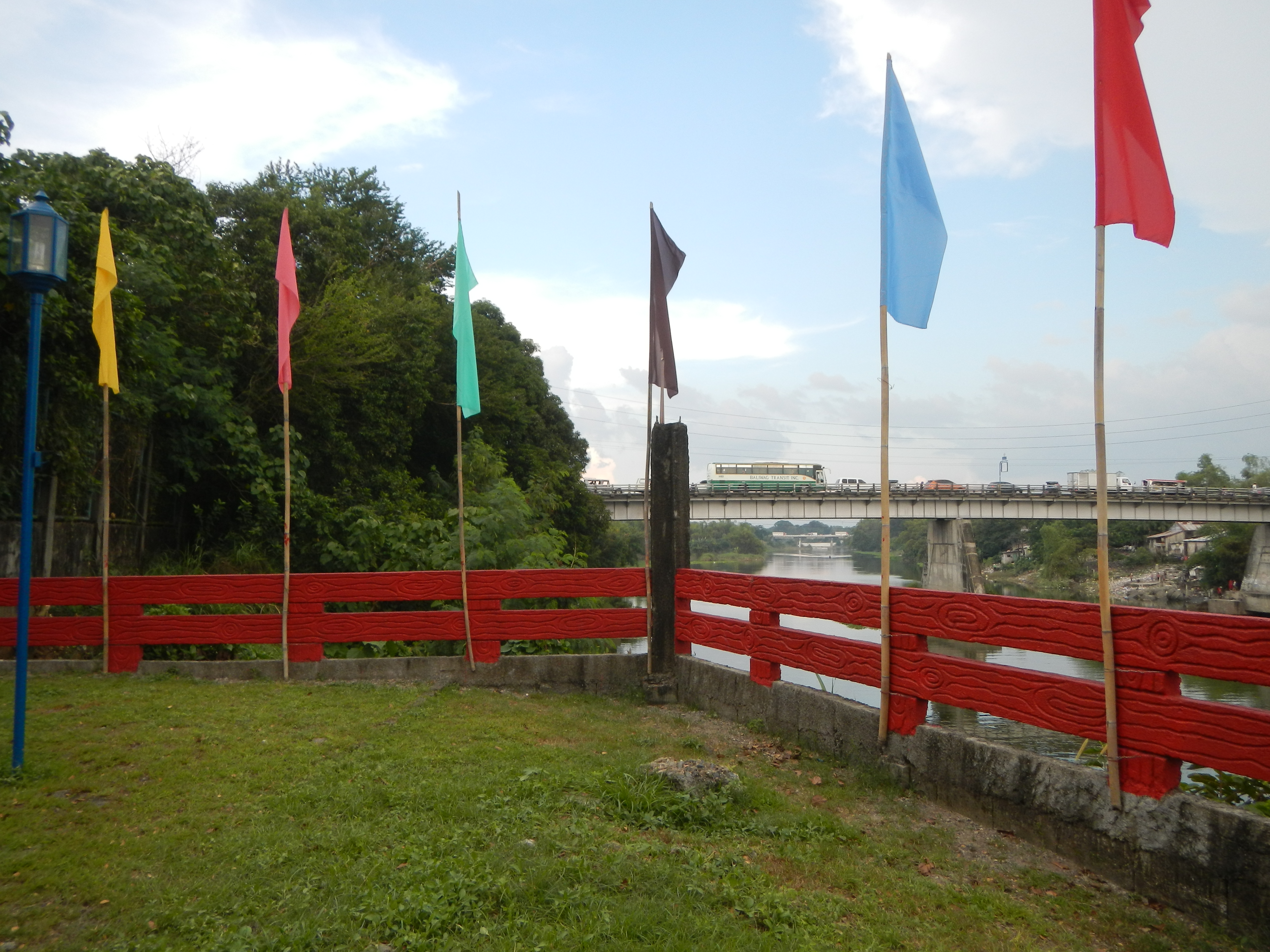
View of Angat River

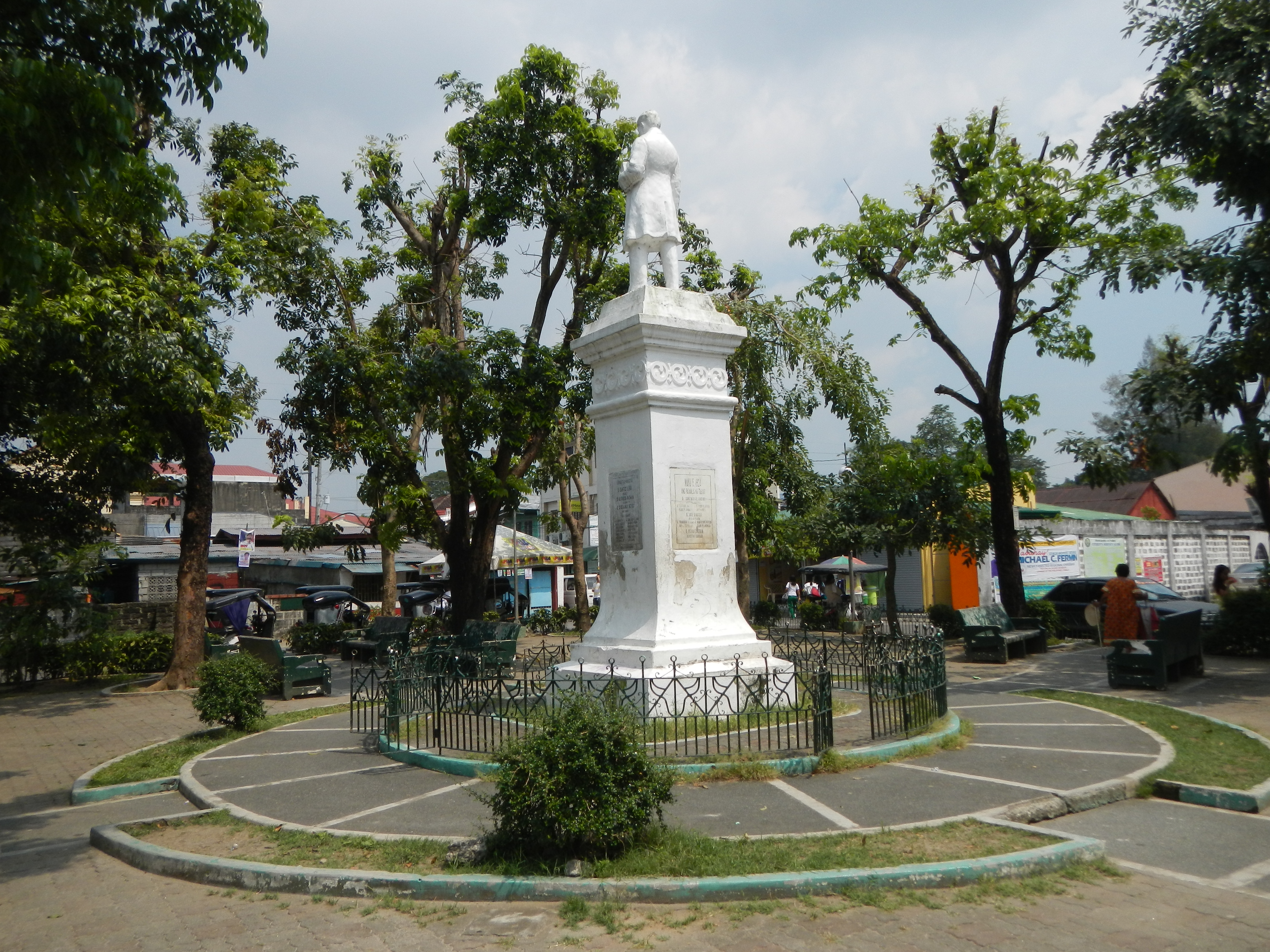
Gat.Jose P. Rizal Statue at Pulilan Plaza

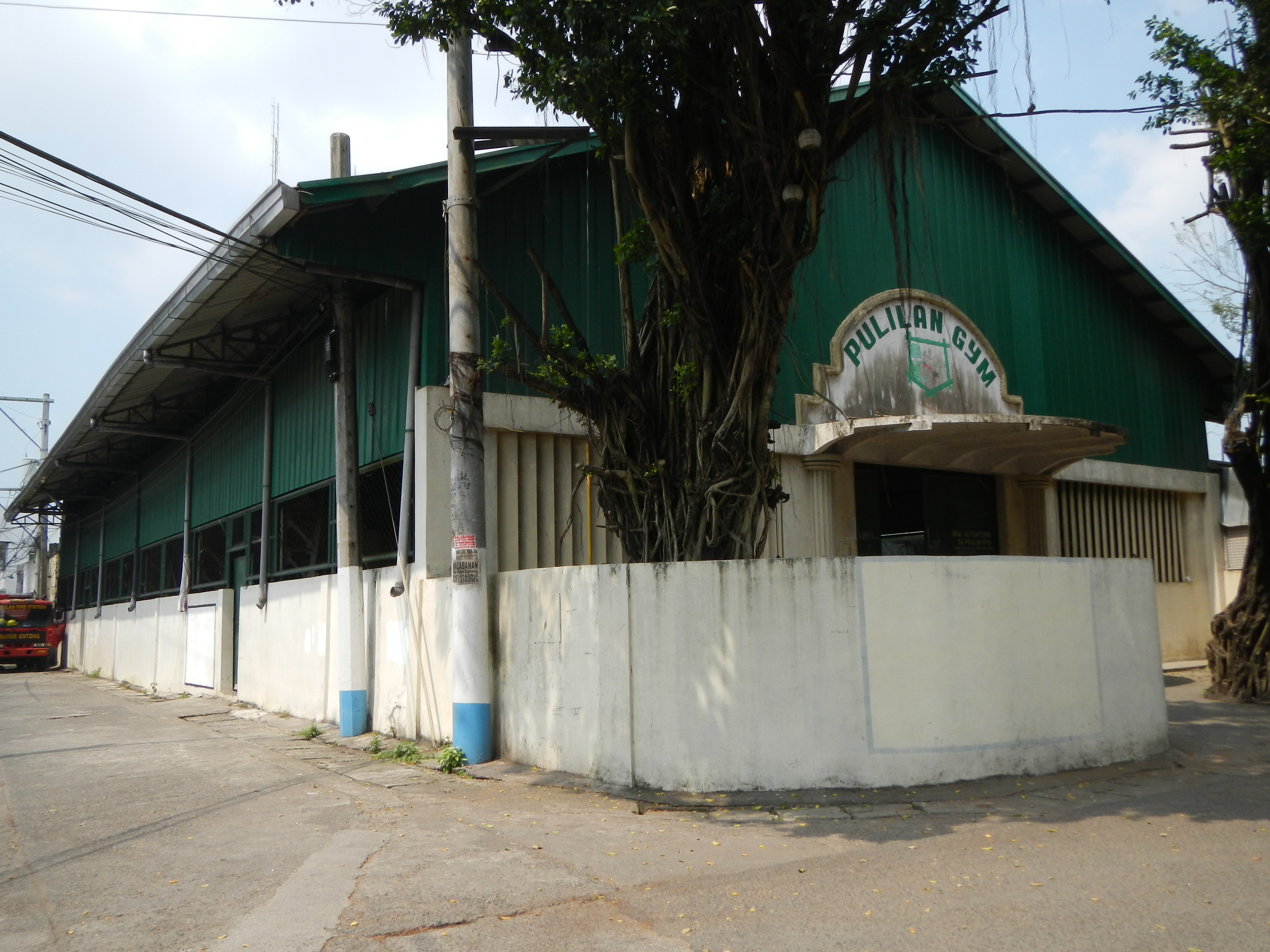
Pulilan Gymnasium

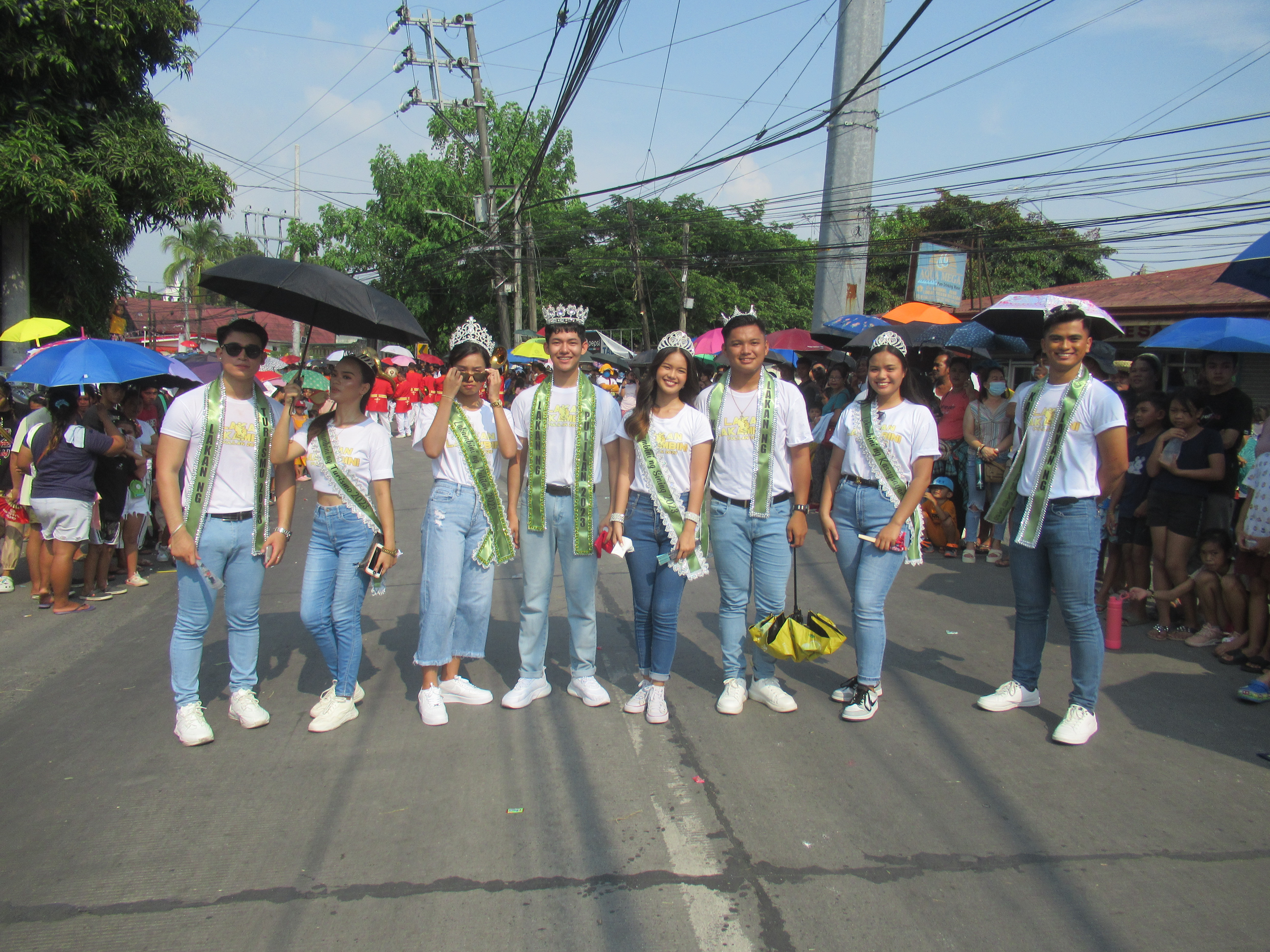
Pulilan Kneeling Carabaos Festival 2023

== Sister cities ==
- Dingalan, Aurora

== See also ==
- San Isidro Labrador Church
- Laguna Copperplate Inscription
- Angat River
