= National Shrine of Our Lady of Fatima =

Roman Catholic church in Valenzuela, Philippines

- Parish of the National Shrine of Our Lady of Fatima
- National Shrine and Parish of Our Lady of Fatima
- Pambansang Dambana ng Mahal na Birhen ng Fatima (Filipino)
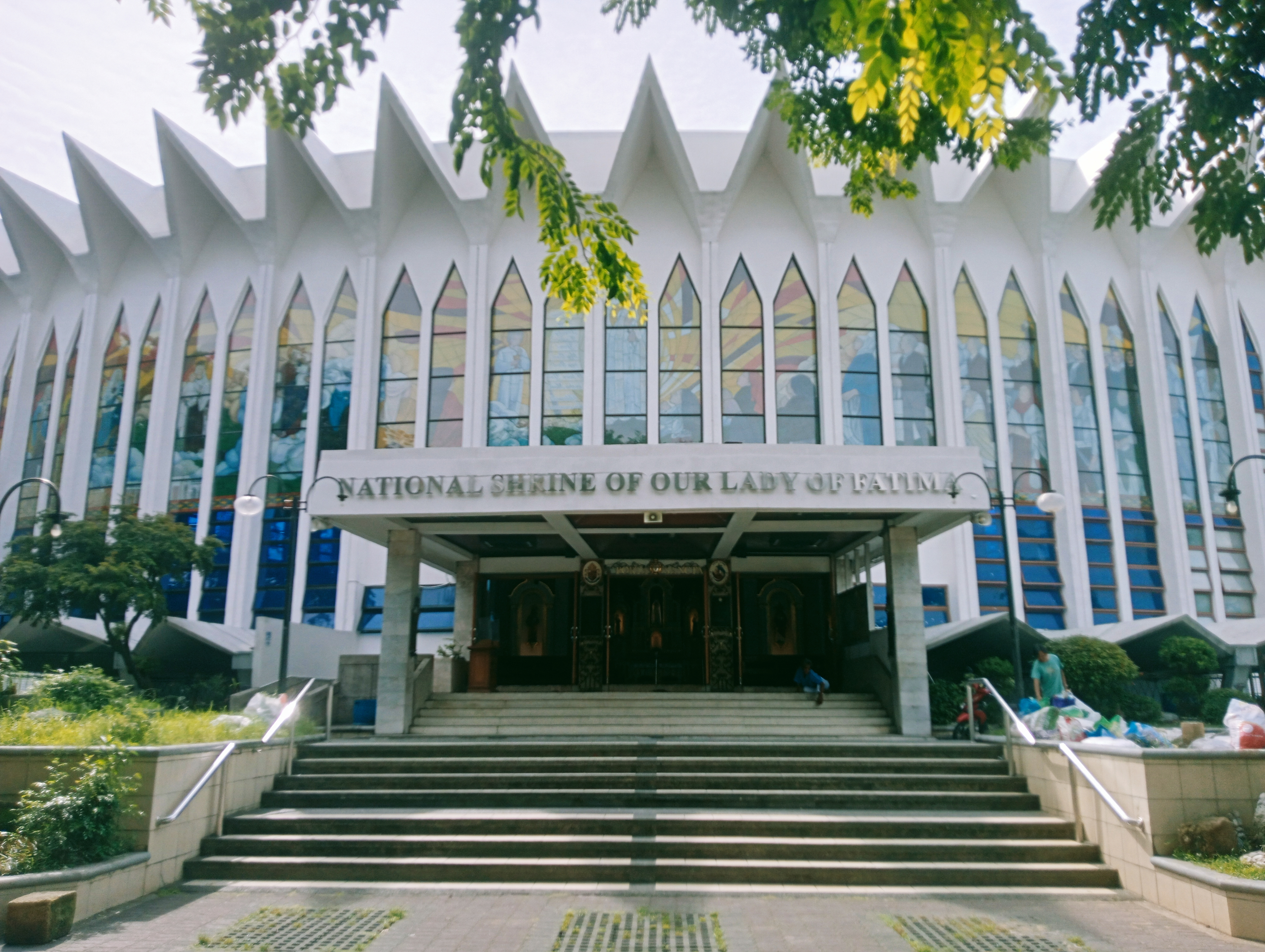
- Church facade in July 2024
- National Shrine of Our Lady of Fatima
- 14°40′57″N 120°58′50″E
- Location: Valenzuela
- Country: Philippines
- Denomination: Roman Catholic

History
- Status: National shrine
- Founded: March 7, 1961
- Founder: Rufino Santos
- Dedication: Our Lady of Fatima
- Dedicated: December 11, 1982

Architecture
- Functional status: Active
- Architectural type: Church building
- Style: Modern
- Groundbreaking: February 7, 1965
- Completed: 1977

Administration
- Province: Manila
- Diocese: Malolos
- Deanery: San Diego De Alcala (Valenzuela)
- Parish: Our Lady of Fatima

Clergy
- Rector: Elmer R. Ignacio

The Parish of the National Shrine of Our Lady of Fatima is a Roman Catholic parish church and national shrine in the Diocese of Malolos in the Philippines. It serves as a Philippine apostolate of Our Lady of Fatima in Fátima, Portugal, which is recognized by the Roman Catholic Church in the Philippines. The shrine is located near the Our Lady of Fatima University campus in Marulas, Valenzuela City in Metro Manila, Philippines. The shrine is one of the three major pilgrimage sites in the Diocese of Malolos, with the National Shrine of St. Anne in Hagonoy and the National Shrine of Divine Mercy in Marilao as the other sites.

The National Shrine of Our Lady of Fatima is the home of the National Pilgrim Image (NPI) of Our Lady of Fatima, the image that became the forefront of the 1986 EDSA People Power Revolution.

== History ==
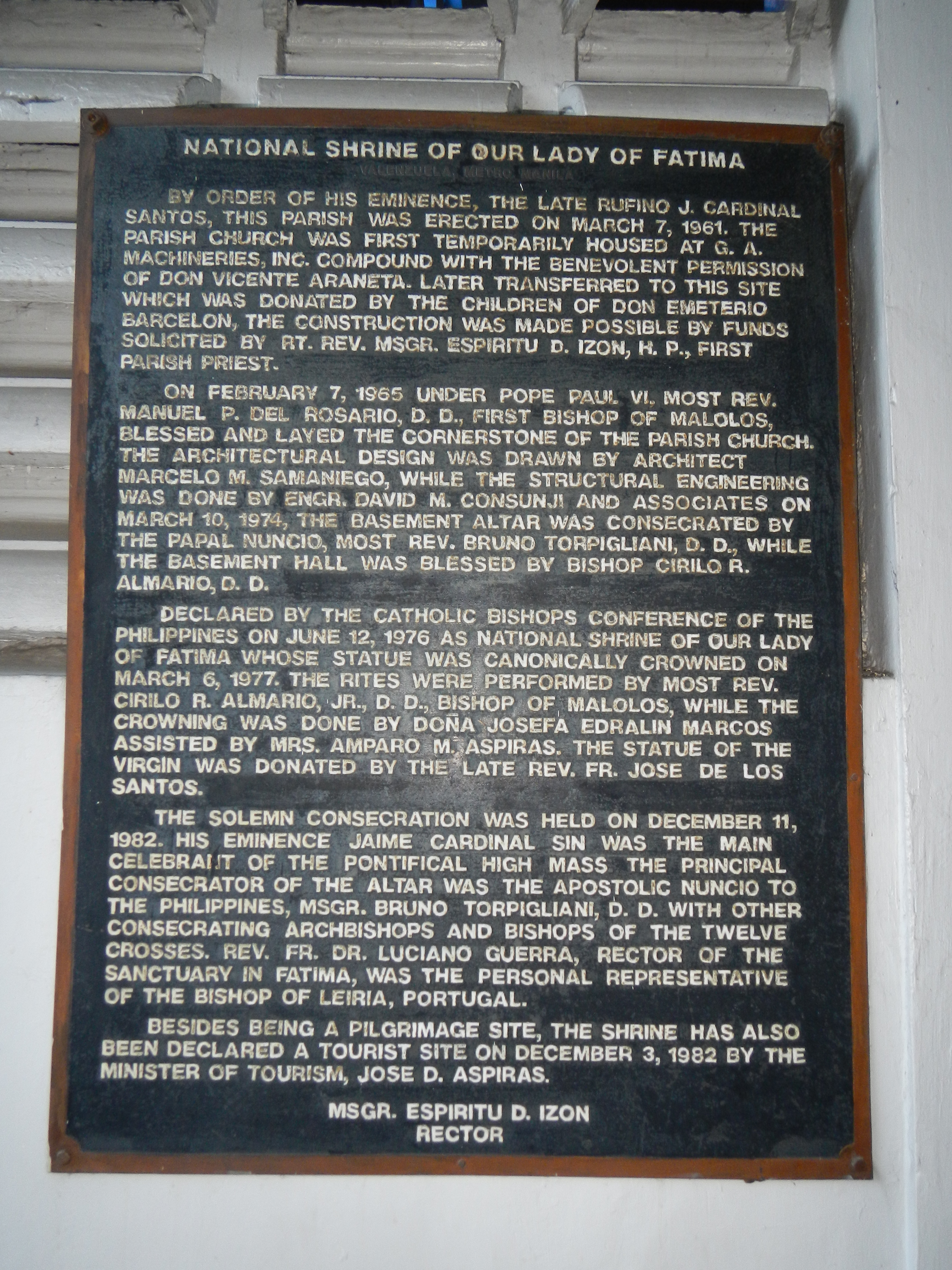
Church historical marker

=== The Birth of the Fatima Parish in Valenzuela ===
Forty-three years after Our Lady's apparition in Fatima, the devotion to her reached the shores of the Orient through the establishment of the first chapter of the Blue Army of Our Lady of Fatima, now known as the World Apostolate of Fatima, in Mangaldan, Pangasinan in 1961, a year after July 21, 1960, when the town of Polo was divided which resulted to the creation of the new municipality of Valenzuela pursuant to the Executive Order 401 signed by then President Carlos P. Garcia. The new town comprised ten barrios that were excluded from the old town of Polo: Karuhatan, Marulas, Malinta, Torres Bugallon (now Gen. T. de Leon), Ugong, Mapulang Lupa, Paso de Blas, Maysan, Canumay, and Bagbaguin. The old church of San Diego de Alcala in Polo, Bulacan, built by the Franciscan friars in 1629, was too far for the people of Valenzuela. It was the time when they yearned for a church that can be called their own.

=== The Canonical Establishment and Early Years of the Parish ===
Responding to the need to form a new parish aside from the old one in Polo, Manila Archbishop, Cardinal Rufino Santos, canonically established on March 7, 1961, a new parish in Valenzuela and appointed Espiritu D. Izon as its first parish priest. Santos readily agreed to the suggestion of Izon that the new parish be placed under the patronage of Our Lady of Fatima. Little did he know that the institution of the new parish would soon become a midpoint of Marian devotion in the town and eventually in the country.

Upon the creation of the parish, there was no yet available place where a church and rectory could be built. Izon started working to fulfill the realization of such endeavor despite the fact that there were also no facilities and equipment for the liturgical services and no funds to start them. The late Don Vicente Araneta generously offered the use of the chapel of their company, the Gregorio Araneta Machineries Inc. (GAMI) compound near MacArthur Highway, as the temporary parish church and convent. It would then be easy for Izon to scout for a place suited to build a parish church. It was also in this chapel where the life-size wooden image of Our Lady of Fatima, a donation from Jose Delos Santos, was first enshrined. For the next years, Father Izon unfolded his plans to build a community of faithful in the parish, including the organization of the parish pastoral council and some religious associations. Not long, the need to start building a church edifice in honor of Our Lady of Fatima remained to be an urgent priority.

Meanwhile, on September 11, 1963, through an Executive Order issued by President Diosdado Macapagal, he reunited the two separated towns of Polo and Valenzuela and retained the name Valenzuela for the reunified town, in memory of the homegrown hero, Pio Valenzuela.

Because of the necessity to build the church, Izon sought the help of the parishioners and went to different places nearby to look for an appropriate site where the church and rectory could be constructed. After many struggles, he approached and appealed to the kindness of the children of Don Emeterio Barcelon to donate a part of their land situated at the highest portion of Pag-asa I Subdivision. The Barcelon Family donated a 3,000-square-meter (32,000 sq ft) lot located 1 kilometer (0.62 mi) away from MacArthur Highway.

=== Building Our Lady’s Church ===
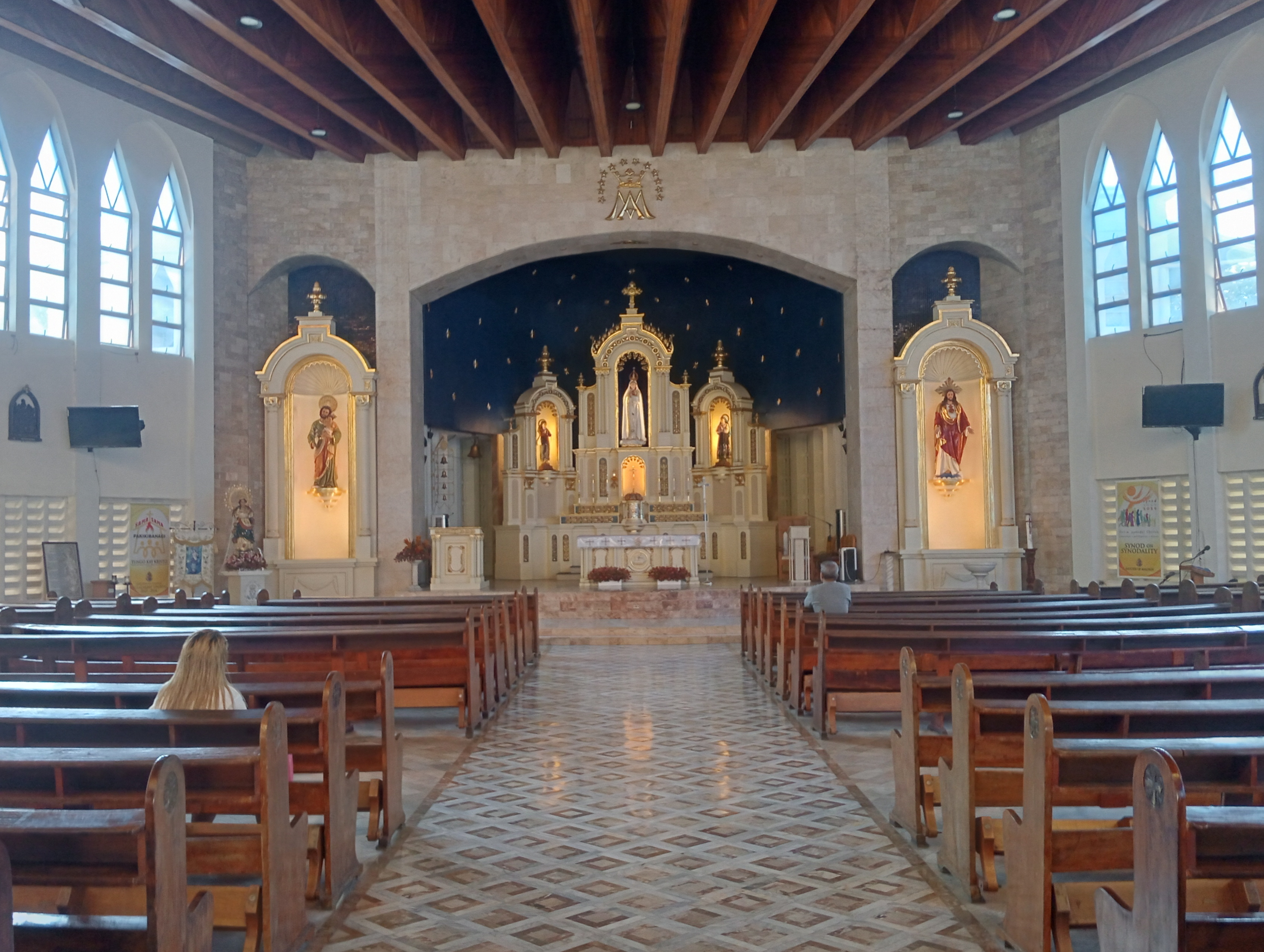
Church interior in 2024

After the lot was turned over to the parish, Izon requested Architect Marcelo Samaniego to draw a blueprint of the unique church with a fan-shape structure and Engineer David Consunji to prepare the specifications. On February 7, 1965, Manuel P. Del Rosario, Bishop of Malolos, blessed and laid the cornerstone of the church.

One main problem was the lack of funds for the construction. Izon had to draw plans for it to be able to collect sufficient funds needed for the future shrine. The various fund-raising campaigns organized by the Construction Committee were fully supported by the parishioners. Furthermore, the leadership of the Parish Pastoral Council Presidents became thriving. In March 1974, the basement of the church was completed in time for its blessing where Masses and other liturgical activities were temporarily held.

After more than ten years of slow and painstaking progress of the construction of the church, Servando Floro, Lydia de Dios, Magno, and Agas suggested to have dawn penitential procession every first Saturday of the month as an offering of the faithful for the immediate completion of the church which Izon positively approved. Barefoot devotees regularly attended the procession, and, not long afterwards, large donations came from benefactors and considerable amounts were produced in fundraising projects.

=== An Extraordinary Honor: National Shrine of Our Lady of Fatima ===
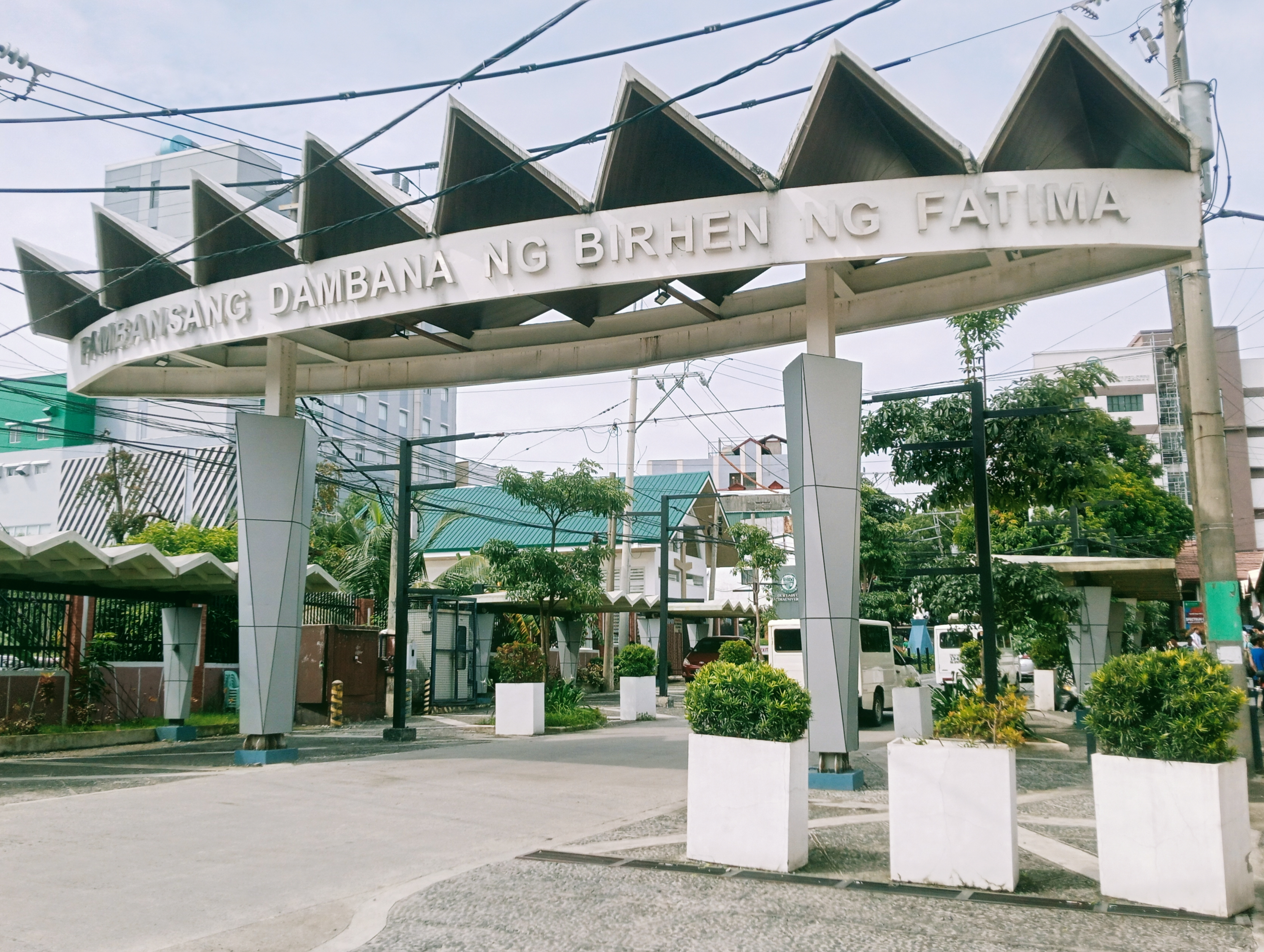
Welcome Arch

Two years after the blessing of the basement, in the middle of the enormous construction project, the Catholic Bishops' Conference of the Philippines (CBCP), then headed by Cardinal Julio Rosales, declared that the parish would become a National Shrine on June 12, 1976. The declaration of the parish as a national shrine also paved the way for the visitations of the image of Our Lady of Fatima in the Diocese of Malolos which started between July 1977 to June 1978, under the leadership of the diocese's second bishop, Cirilo R. Almario, Jr.

After the church was proclaimed as a national shrine, the solemn coronation of the image of Our Lady of Fatima, which was first enshrined at the GAMI Chapel, was held on March 6, 1977. The Eucharistic celebration was headed by Bishop Almario. Doña Josefa Edralin Marcos, mother of the President Ferdinand Marcos, led the coronation ceremony and was assisted by Amparo Aspiras while Carmen Santos donated the crown. The rites took place at the basement of the church.

On September 4, 1982, Izon approved the creation of the World Apostolate of Fatima chapter in the parish, which received astonishing support from the parishioners as well as the lay leaders. Since the national shrine was slowly becoming known in the country, then Tourism Minister Jose D. Aspiras declared it as a tourist site on December 3, 1982.

=== The Dedication of the National Shrine ===
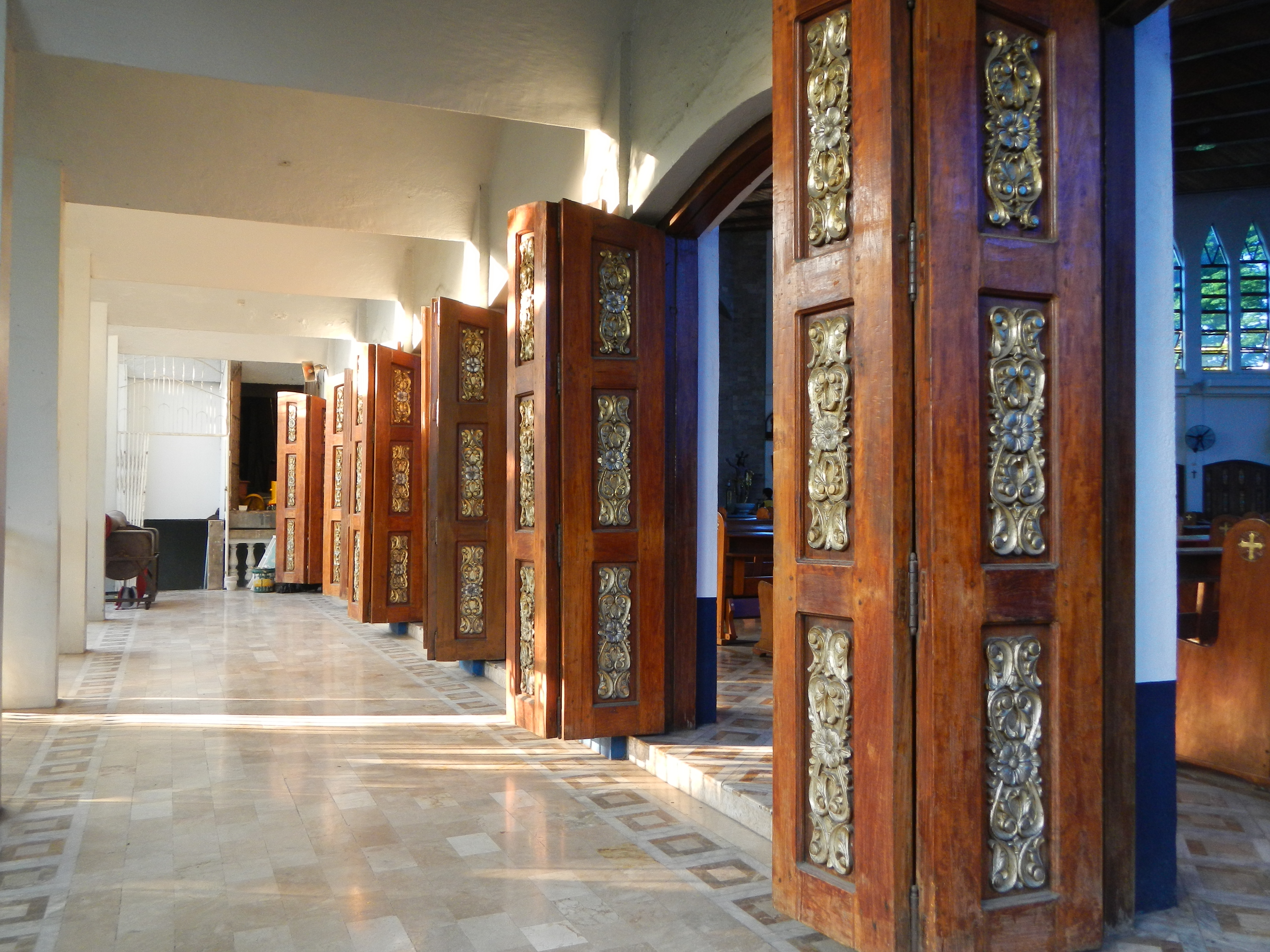
Ornately decorated wooden doors serve as side entrances.

The Solemn Dedication Rites of the National Shrine was held on the morning of December 11, 1982. It was led by the Apostolic Nuncio to the Philippines, Archbishop Bruno Torpigliani, as the principal consecrator, while Manila Archbishop, Cardinal Jaime Sin, as the main celebrant and homilist of the Eucharistic Celebration. Twelve archbishops and bishops from the different parts of the country were the consecrators of the 12 crosses. Luciano Guerra, rector of the Sanctuary and Shrine of Our Lady of Fatima in Fatima, Portugal graced the event as representative of the Bishop of Leiria, Alberto Cosme do Amaral. The rites of dedication rewarded the rigorous efforts of Izon, the lay leaders, parishioners, devotees, and benefactors in completing the construction of the church, after years of planning and fundraising.

=== Patronage and canonical coronation of the image ===
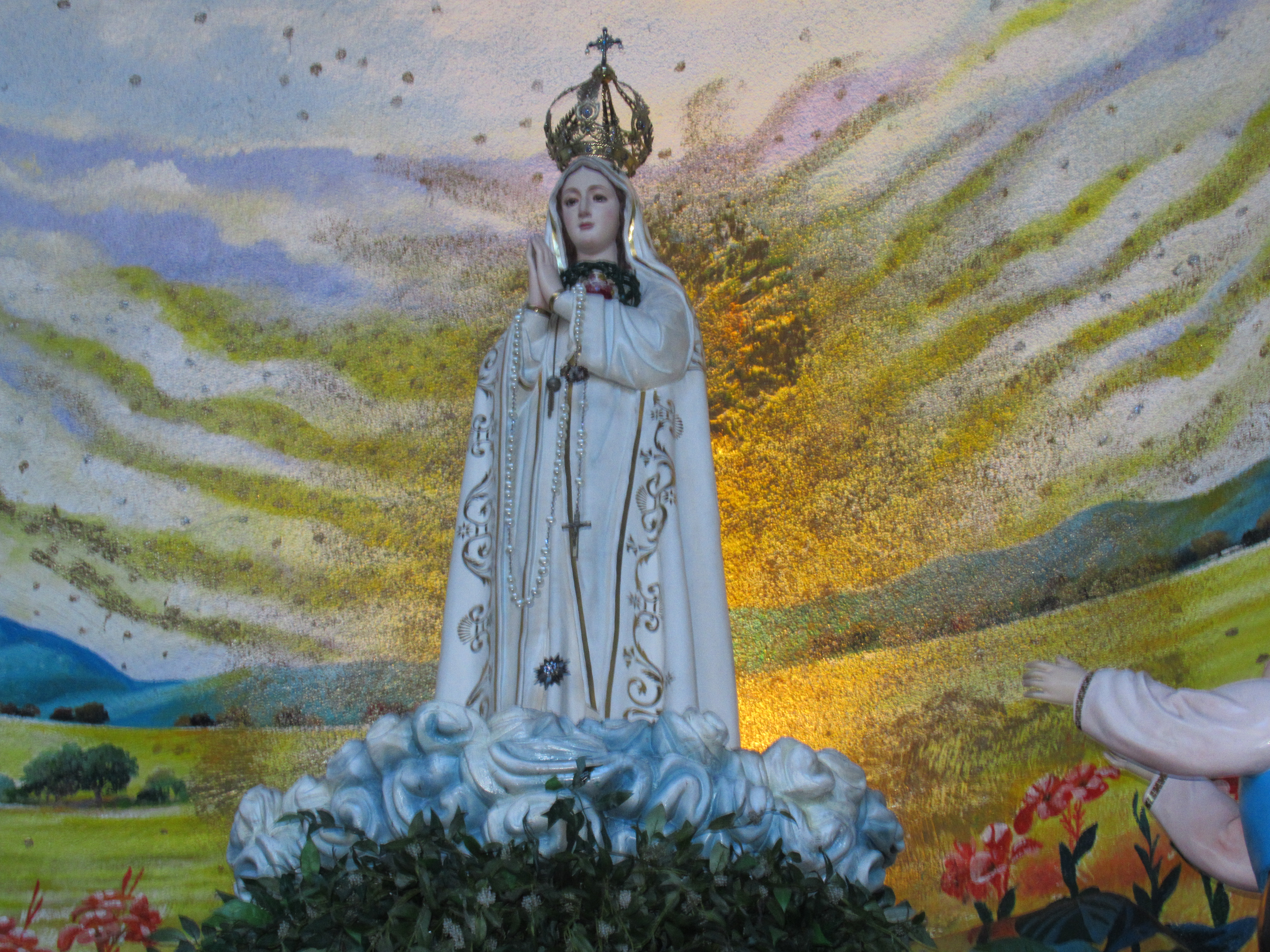
Our Lady of Fatima

The City Council of Valenzuela, through their Ordinance Number 16, Series of 2011, formally declared the Virgin of Fatima as the patroness of Valenzuela City on February 28, 2011. Later, with the growing devotion and love for the Marian statue, the "National Pilgrim Image" of the shrine was first granted an episcopal coronation, with the rites presided by the now former bishop of Malolos, Jose Francisco Oliveros on May 13, 2017, which coincided with the centenary of the Fátima apparitions. The Sanctuary of Fátima from Portugal bestowed to the image its own episcopal crown along with a rosary. In 2022, the shrine made efforts to organize documents and gather testimonies for an official petition for a pontifical—canonical coronation for the same image. On November 21, 2023, the decree authorizing the coronation was formally granted, signed by the prefect of the Dicastery for Divine Worship and the Discipline of the Sacraments, Cardinal Arthur Roche. The image was canonically crowned on February 25, 2024, officiated by the Papal Nuncio to the Philippines, Charles John Brown. The commemorative act also marked the 38th anniversary of the EDSA People Power Revolution.

== Rectors ==
Below is the list of shrine rectors, who also function as pastor or parish priest.

Name	Years of Pastorship	Present Assignment
Espiritu D. Izon	1961–1984	deceased
Deogracias S. Iñiguez	1984–1989	Bishop Emeritus of Kalookan
Edgardo B. Villacorte	1990–2000	deceased
Moises Andrade	2001–2009	deceased
Bartolome G. Santos	2009–2018	Bishop of Iba
Gener S.R. Garcia	2018–2021	Parish Priest of Parokya ng Inmaculada Concepcion, Baliwag
Elmer R. Ignacio	2021–present	National Shrine of Our Lady of Fatima, Karuhatan Valenzuela City
