= Hagonoy =

Hagonoy may refer to:

- Hagonoy, Bulacan
- Hagonoy Church
- Hagonoy, Davao del Sur
- Hagonoy, Taguig
- Hagonoy, the Filipino common name for the plant chromolaena odorata
