= National Shrine of Saint Anne (Philippines) =

Roman Catholic church in Bulacan, Philippines

Santa Ana Shrine
- National Shrine and Parish of Saint Anne
- Santuario Nacional y Parroquia de Santa Ana (Spanish)
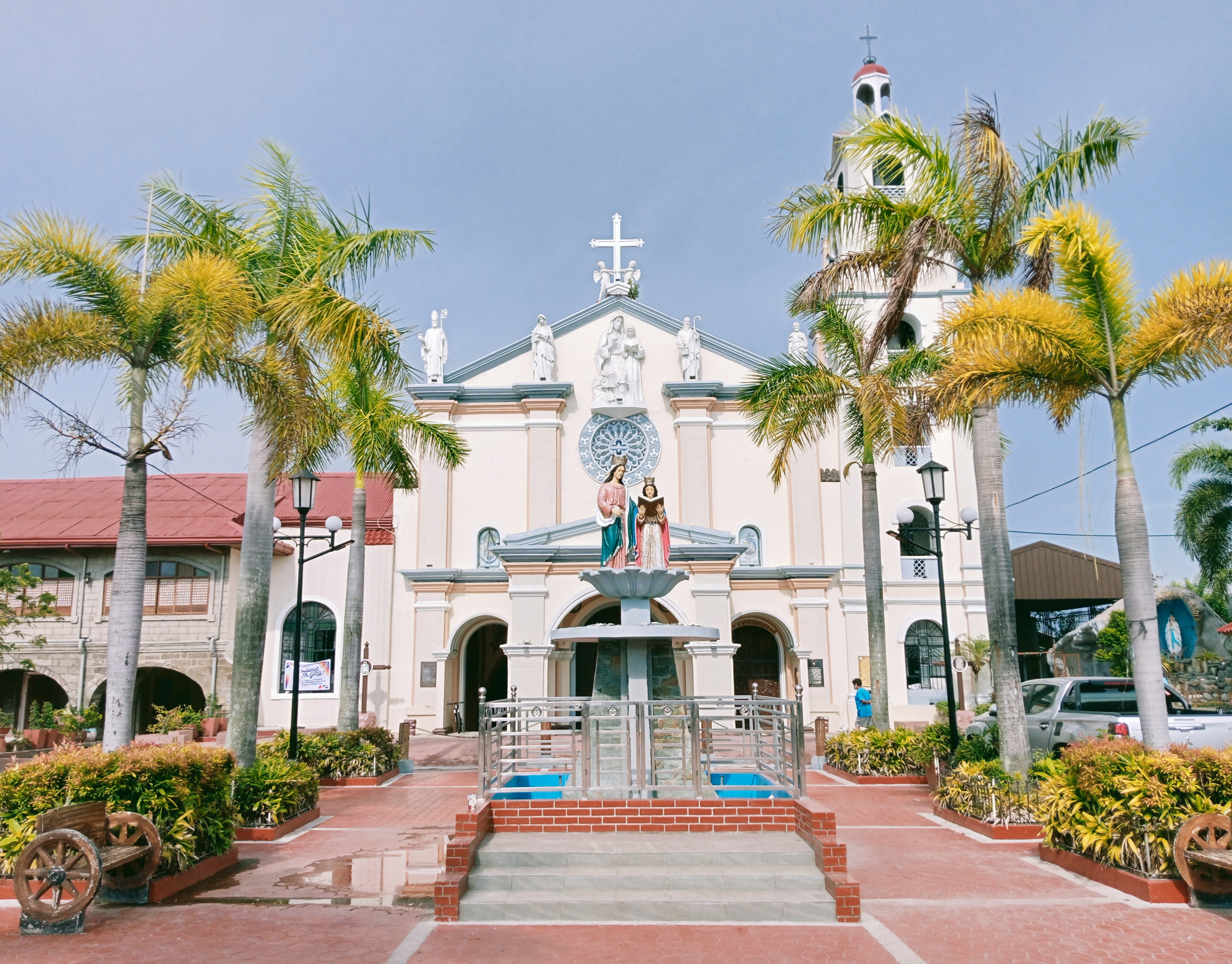
- Church facade in 2023

- Location in Bulacan Location in Luzon Location in the Philippines
- 14°50′06″N 120°44′03″E
- Location: Santo Niño, Hagonoy, Bulacan
- Country: Philippines
- Denomination: Roman Catholic

History
- Status: Parish church and National Shrine
- Founder: Augustinians
- Dedication: Saint Anne
- Dedicated: January 17, 1582

Architecture
- Functional status: Active
- Architectural type: Church building
- Style: Baroque
- Completed: 1752

Specifications
- Materials: Stone, Sand, Gravel, Cement, Steel

Administration
- District: Western
- Archdiocese: Manila
- Diocese: Malolos

Clergy
- Archbishop: Jose Advincula
- Bishop: Dennis C. Villarojo
- Priest: Rev. Fr. Jose Rodel Ponce

The National Shrine and Parish of Saint Anne, commonly known as Santa Ana Shrine or Hagonoy Church, is an 18th-century, Baroque Roman Catholic church located in Brgy. Santo Niño, Hagonoy, Bulacan, Philippines. The parish church, dedicated to Saint Anne, is under the jurisdiction of the Diocese of Malolos. It was declared a National Shrine in 1991. In 1981, the National Historical Institute, a precursor to the National Historical Commission of the Philippines, installed as a marker of the brief history with the church.

== History ==
=== Parish history ===
Sources indicate that Hagonoy was already a thriving community before the arrival of the Spanish missionaries. It is claimed that the local chieftain of prehistoric Hagonoy, along with the chieftains of Betis and Macabebe, confronted Miguel Lopez de Legazpi during the conquest of Manila in 1571. Regarding the beginnings of the Catholic institution in the town, Hagonoy was established as a visita of Calumpit as early as 1581 when Don Gonzalo Ronquillo de Peñalosa, then Governor General of the Philippines, assigned Hagonoy to Sargento Juan Moron to be included in the Encomienda of Calumpit. Juan Moron later transferred his jurisdiction over Hagonoy to Fray Diego de Ordoñez de Vivar, who established Hagonoy as one of the visitas of the Convento de Calumpit. Documentation from a private meeting of the Augustinians on January 17, 1582, includes Fray Diego Ordoñez de Vivar as a signatory for Hagonoy. Another meeting on September 21, 1582, confirms the existence of the convent of Hagonoy with Fray Diego Vivar as its first minister.

=== Edifice history ===
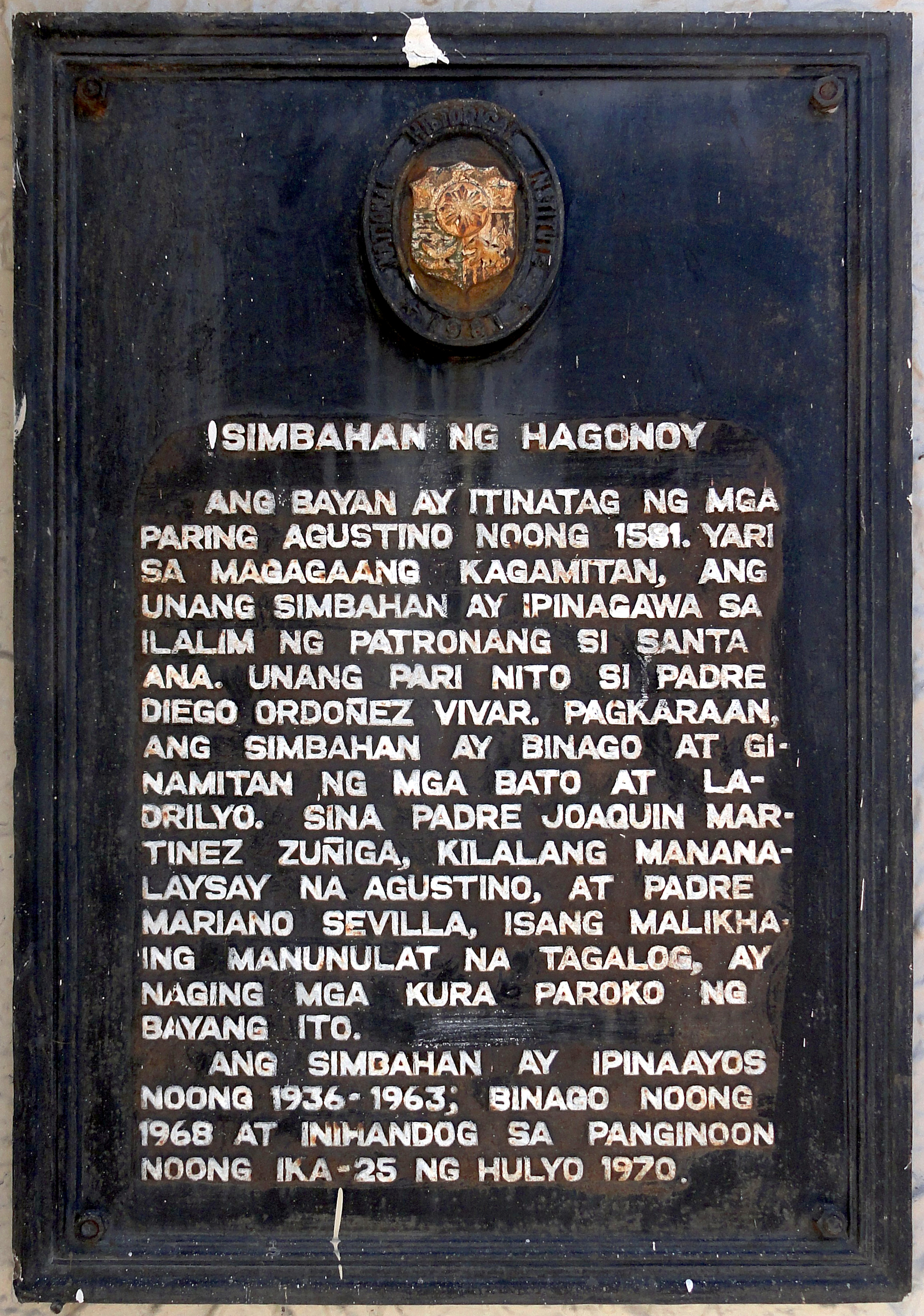
Church NHI historical marker installed in 1981

Fray Diego Ordoñez de Vivar erected parochial structures made of light materials in Barrio Quinabalon (now Barangay Santa Monica) and placed them under the guidance of Saint Anne. From 1731 to 1734, a stone and brick church was built by Fray Juan Albarrán, possibly still on the Brgy. Santa Monica site. This church was destroyed by fire on August 12, 1748. The present church's foundations were laid in 1747 on its current site in Barrio Sto. Niño during the time of Fray Eusebio Polo. The site was moved to its present location due to flooding at the former site. Fray Buenaventura Roldán completed the church in 1752. Another church, built from 1815 to 1836 by Fray Juan Coronado, was destroyed by fire in 1856, which also damaged 30 houses in the town center. Fray Manuel Alvarez, appointed parish priest in 1862, began constructing a larger church to accommodate more people. Besides expanding the church, its design was remodeled into one that was considered unique for that era. The church walls were partially damaged by an earthquake in 1871, and repairs were made soon after under the leadership of Fray Ignacio Manzanares. Secular priests from the Archdiocese of Manila began administering the church in 1900 after the Augustinian order evacuated due to the Philippine Revolution. Church renovations were carried out in 1936 and 1961, the latter of which saw the addition of the porte-cochere by Father Celestino Rodriguez. Further renovations occurred from 1968 to 1970 under Monsignor Jose B. Aguinaldo, who is attributed with the present façade featuring the predominant images of saints resting atop the pilasters.

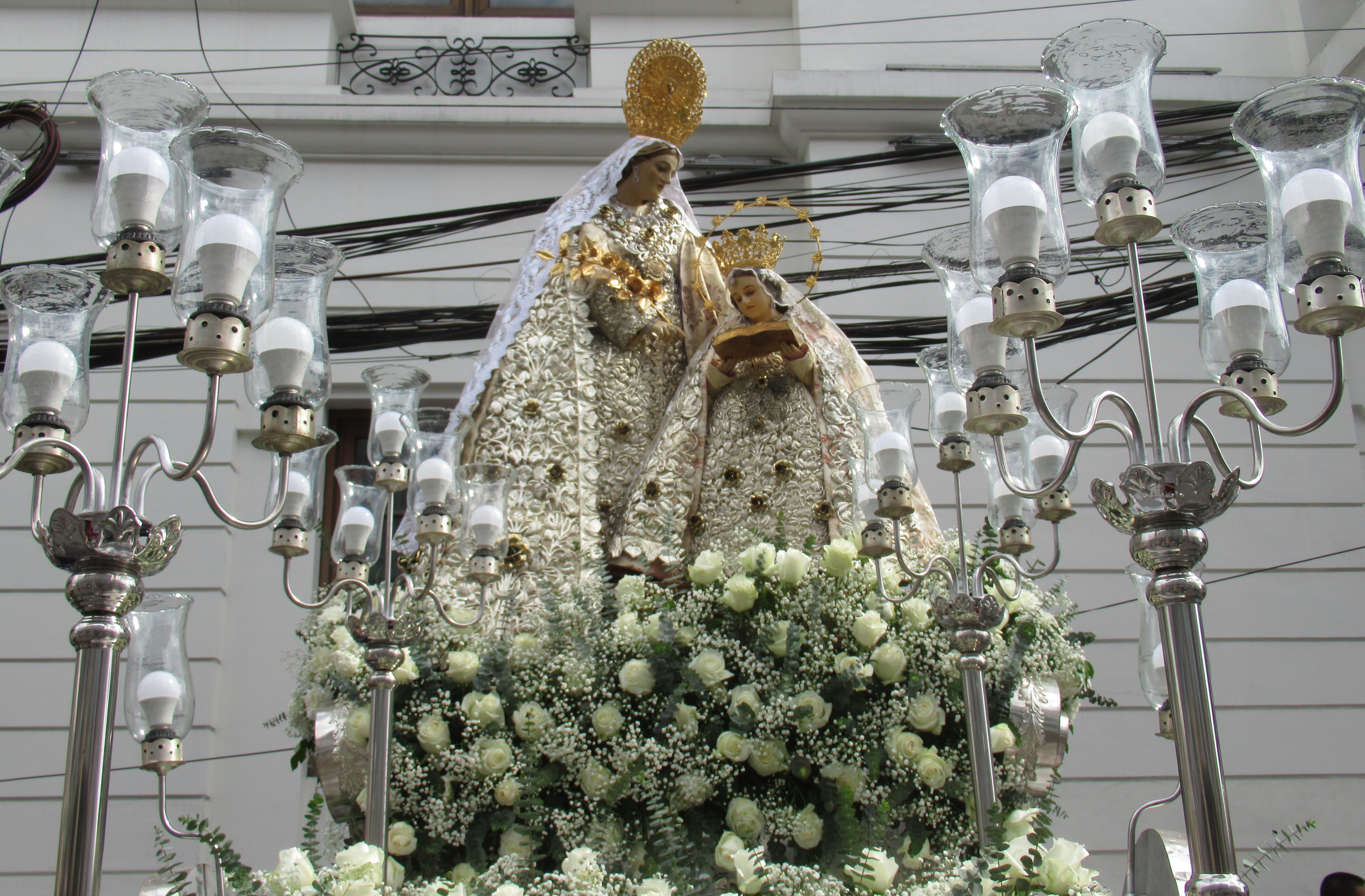
The original image of Santa Ana de Hagonoy at the 41st Intramuros Grand Marian Procession which was held on December 4, 2022

== Architecture ==
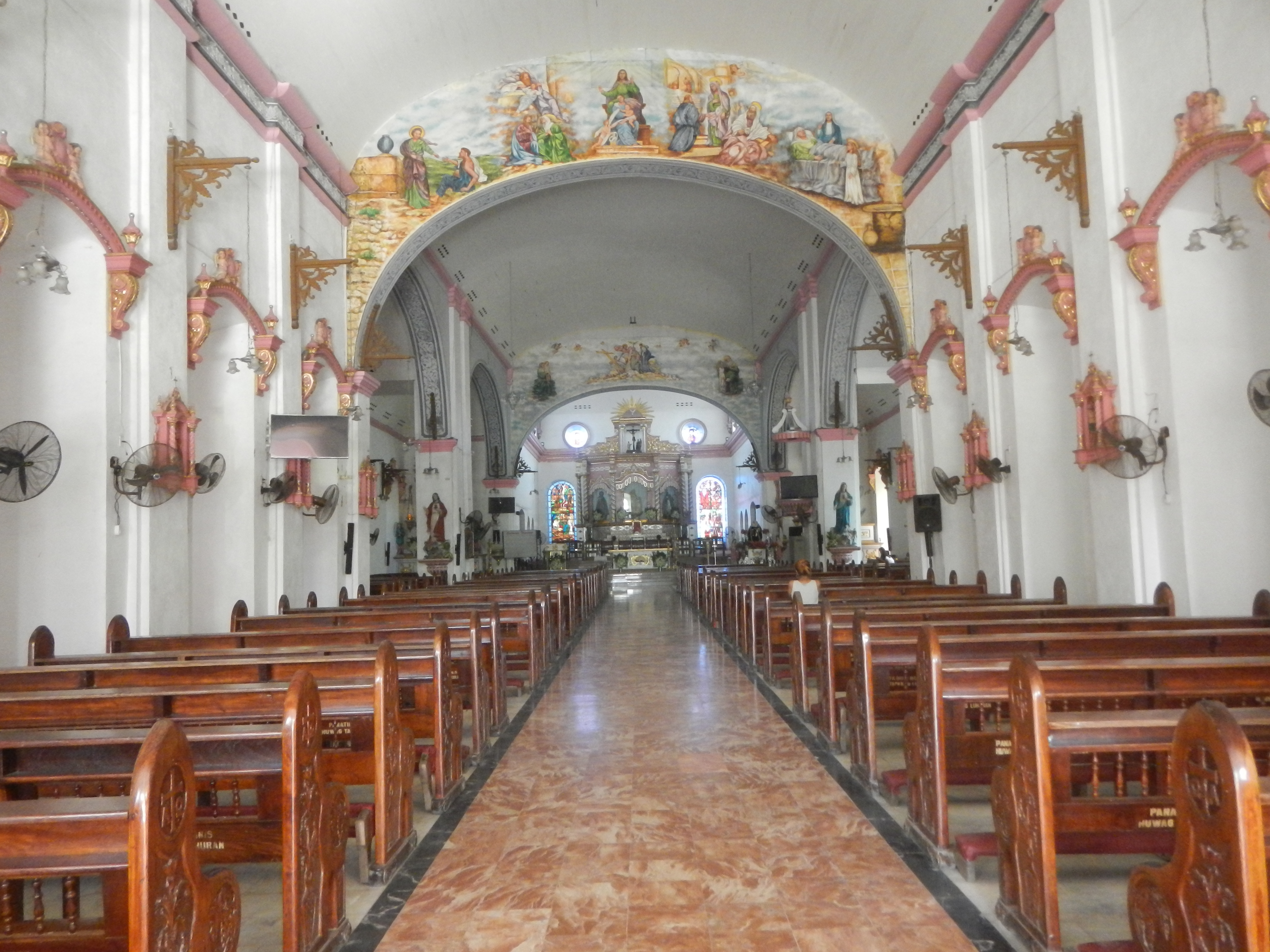
Church interior in 2017

Prior to the mid-20th century renovation, the church's façade was bare of ornamentation except for volutes at the ends of the imaginary triangular pediment, circular reliefs, and buttress-like pilasters capped with roof tiles. The façade featured five windows: three semicircular arched and two rectangular on the first level. A porte-cochere with a balustraded top obscured the view of the lower part of the façade. Much of the façade design was altered after the 1970s renovation. It now includes three arched entrances, each with intricately carved hardwood doors. Tuscan capitals were added to the four pilasters, which are now topped with large images of Augustinian saints. A rose window and a tableau of Saint Anne and the Virgin Mary were also added to the center of the pediment. The entire façade is capped with a cross held by two cherubs. To the left of the church stands the six-level rectangular bell tower. Originally a five-level tower, a sixth level and a cupola were added during the latest reconstruction. The bell tower has minimal ornamentation, featuring only balustraded semicircular arch windows and buttresses at the corners.

== See also ==
Other declared national shrines under the Roman Catholic Diocese of Malolos:

- National Shrine of the Divine Mercy
- National Shrine of Our Lady of Fatima
- Parish of San Pascual Baylon and National Shrine of Nuestra Señora Inmaculada Concepcion de Salambao
