= Divine Mercy Shrine (Misamis Oriental) =

Roman Catholic shrine in Misamis Oriental, Philippines

- The shrine in 2023
- Location: Divine Mercy Hills, PSB-Ulaliman, El Salvador, Misamis Oriental, Philippines
- Coordinates: 8°32′49″N 124°31′41″E
- Completion date: 2008
- Dedicated to: Divine Mercy
- Website: https://divinemercyshrineelsalvador.org/divine-mercy/

The Divine Mercy Shrine is a Roman Catholic monument in El Salvador, Misamis Oriental, Philippines. It features a 50-foot (15 m) statue of Jesus as the Divine Mercy as the focal point of Divine Mercy Hills, a tract of land overlooking Macajalar Bay on the island of Mindanao.

The nine-hectare (22-acre) land for the Shrine was purchased for a nominal amount and the complex was paid for by donations. The shrine was completed in 2008 and serves as a pilgrimage site for Divine Mercy devotees.

== Gallery ==
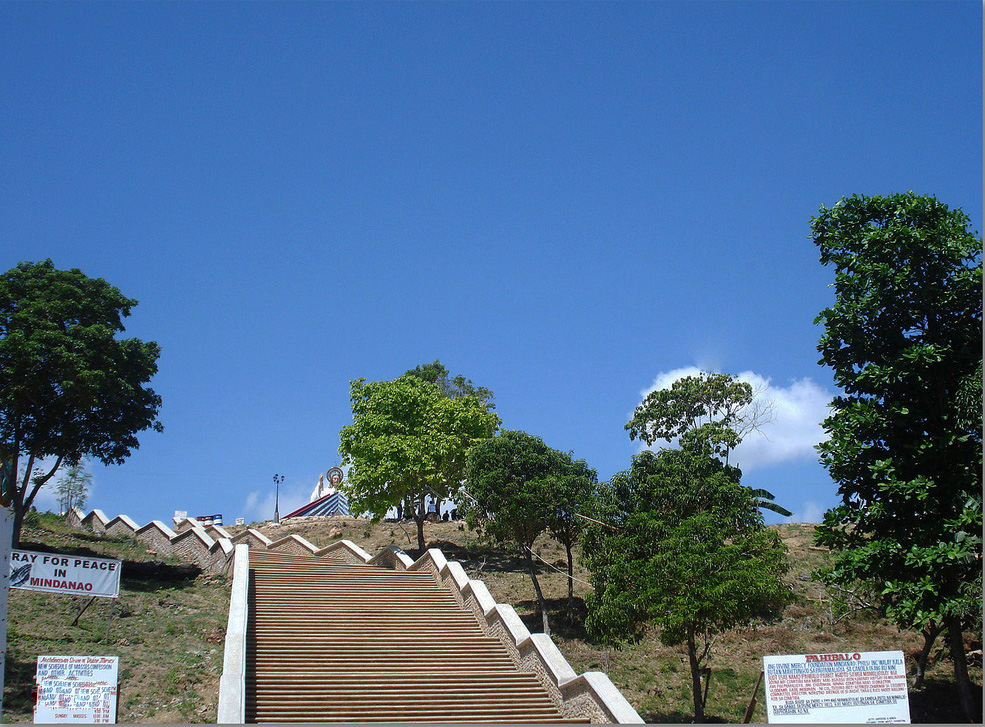
200 steps up to reach the top where the statue is located

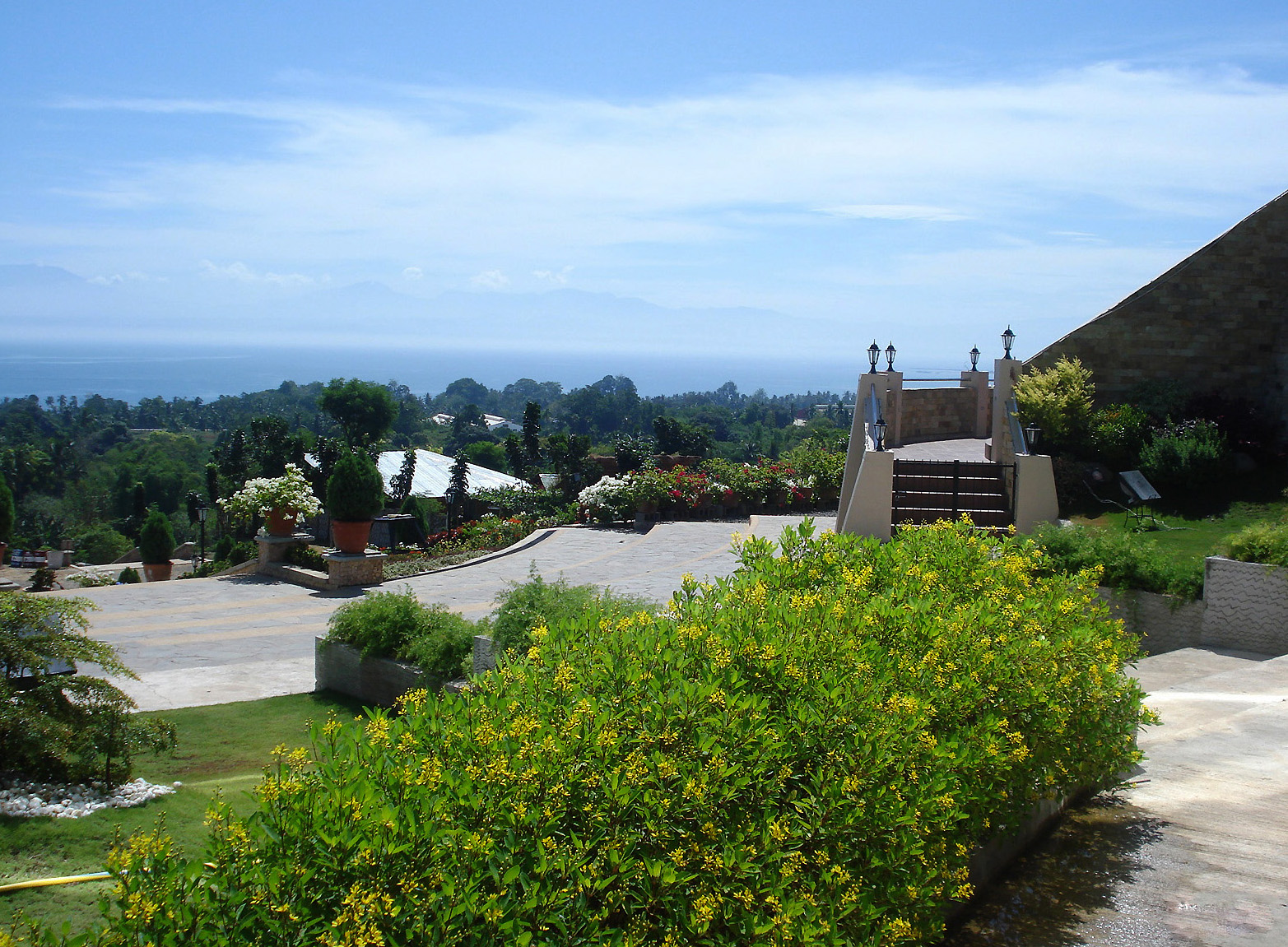
View from Divine Mercy Hills

== See also ==
- List of statues of Jesus
- List of tallest statues
- Divine Mercy Sanctuary (Kraków)
- Cristo Redentor, an iconic statue in Rio de Janeiro, Brazil
- Lux Mundi, a large statue of Christ in the United States of America
- Saint Faustyna Kowalska
- National Shrine of The Divine Mercy, Philippines
