= Cirilo Almario =

Filipino Roman Catholic bishop

The Most Reverend Cirilo Reyes Almario, Jr. D.D.
- 2nd Bishop of Malolos
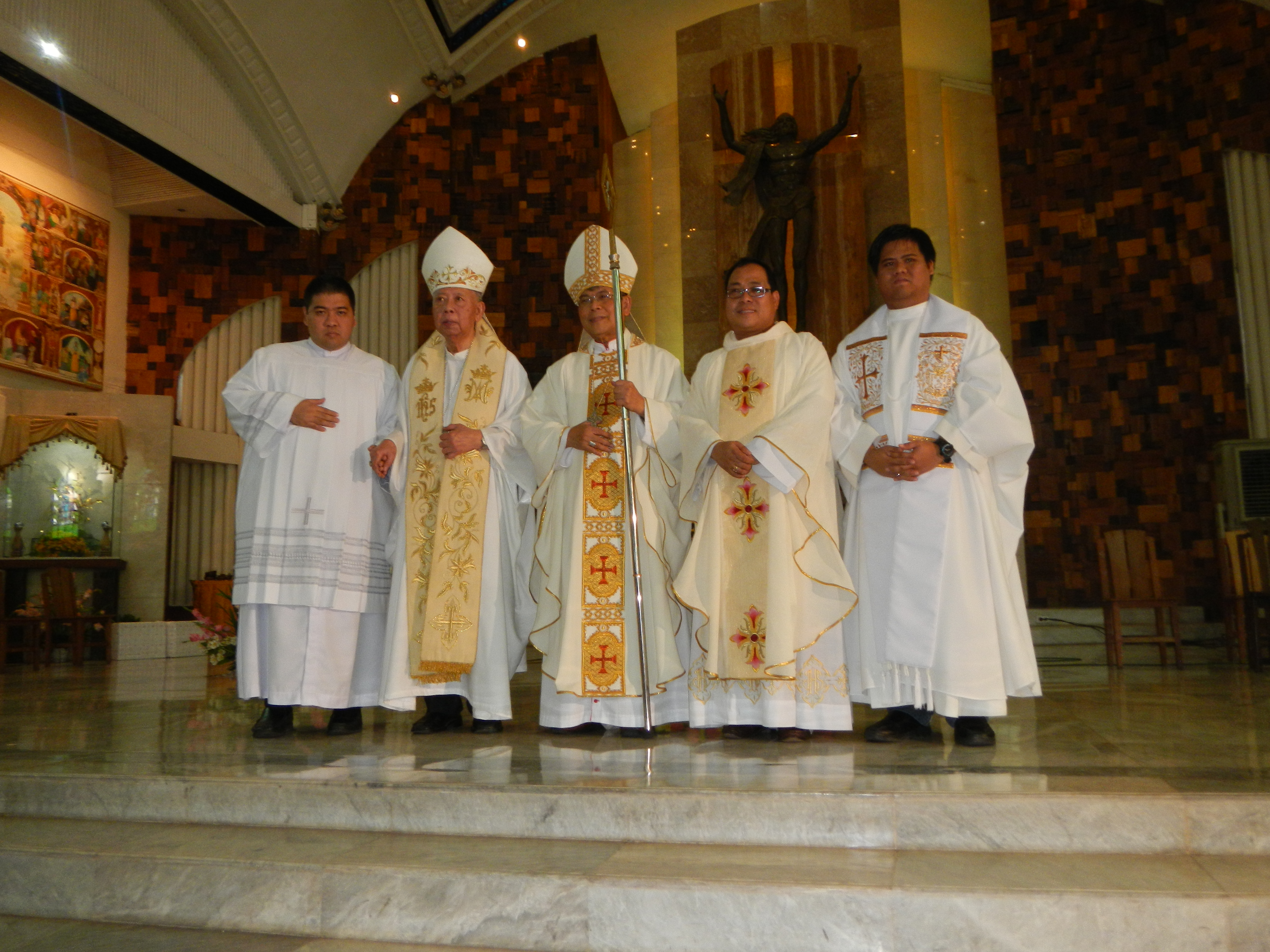
- Most Rev. Cirilo R. Almario, Jr., D.D.
- See: Malolos
- In office: 15 December 1977 – 20 January 1996
- Predecessor: Manuel P. del Rosario, D.D.
- Successor: Rolando T. Tirona, OCD, D.D.
- Other posts: Vicar-Capitular of Lipa; Titular Bishop of Zaba

Orders
- Ordination: 30 November 1956 by Alejandro Olalia, D.D.
- Consecration: 18 October 1973 by Brunio Torpigliani, D.D.

Personal details
- Born: Cirilo Reyes Almario, Jr. January 11, 1931 Caridad, Cavite, Commonwealth of the Philippines
- Died: October 14, 2016 (aged 85) Guiguinto, Bulacan
- Buried: Malolos Cathedral Crypt
- Denomination: Roman Catholic
- Education: Caridad Elementary School; St. Francis de Sales Minor Seminary
- Alma mater: University of Santo Tomas Central Seminary
- Motto: Omnia Omnibus (All things to all men)
- Coat of arms

Styles of Cirilo R. Almario Jr.
- Reference style: The Most Reverend
- Spoken style: Your Excellency
- Religious style: Bishop

Cirilo Reyes Almario Jr. (January 11, 1931 – October 14, 2016) was a Roman Catholic bishop from the Philippines and was the second ordinary bishop of the Diocese of Malolos from December 15, 1977, until January 20, 1996.

== Early life and education ==
Almario was born on January 11, 1931, in Caridad, Cavite. He was educated during his elementary years at Caridad Elementary School and attended high school at St. Francis de Sales Minor Seminary in Lipa City, Batangas. He undertook his philosophy and theology studies at the Royal and Pontifical University of Santo Tomas Central Seminary in Manila. In 1957, he graduated with licentiates of philosophy and theology at UST Central Seminary.

== Episcopacy ==
Almario was ordained to the priesthood on November 30, 1956, during the Second National Eucharistic Congress at Rizal Memorial Coliseum by then Most Rev. Alejandro Olalia, D.D., Archbishop of Lipa. Later on, Almario was appointed Vicar Capitular (present-day Apostolic Administrator) of the Archdiocese of Lipa before he was appointed as the Coadjutor Bishop of Malolos on August 22, 1973. He was consecrated on October 18, 1973, at San Sebastian Cathedral in Lipa, by then Most Rev. Bruno Torpigliani, Apostolic Nuncio to the Philippines with then Archbishop of Lipa, Ricardo J. Vidal and Bishop of Laoag, Rafael Lim, as co-consecrators of his ordination. He was ordained as the Titular Bishop of Zaba, alongside his appointment as Coadjutor Bishop of Malolos. He served as Coadjutor Bishop of the Roman Catholic Diocese of Malolos, Philippines from 1973 to 1977 until then Malolos Bishop, Most Rev. Manuel P. del Rosario, D.D. resigned due to his failing health. On December 15, 1977, he succeeded Bishop del Rosario as the 2nd ordinary bishop of Malolos and served the Diocese from 1977 until he resigned in 1996. He was succeeded by now Archbishop of Caceres, Most Rev. Rolando T. Tirona as the 3rd Bishop of the Diocese thus, Almario was then granted the title of Bishop-Emeritus of Malolos. Under his leadership, the Diocese of Malolos grew bigger as he initiated many reforms and projects that would help the enrichment of Catholicism in the diocese. He also initiated the building of the diocese's own seminaries, the Immaculate Conception Major and Minor Seminary in Tabe, Guiguinto, Bulacan. Also, it is under his term when the diocese celebrated their 25th anniversary since its inception. He also officiated the first Synod in 1987 to 1988.

== Later life and death ==
Almario died on October 14, 2016, at the age of 85 at the Immaculate Conception Seminary, Guiguinto, Bulacan. He was then accorded funeral rites at the Malolos Cathedral and was buried at the crypt of the cathedral beside his predecessor, Bishop del Rosario.

== Notes ==
Catholic Church titles
| Preceded by Manuel P. del Rosario, D.D. | Bishop of Malolos; December 15, 1977 – January 20, 1996 | Succeeded by Rolando T. Tirona, OCD, D.D. |
