= Diocese of Malolos =

Latin Catholic diocese in the Philippines

Diocese of Malolos Dioecesis Malolosinae Diyosesis ng Malolos Diócesis de Malolos

Catholic
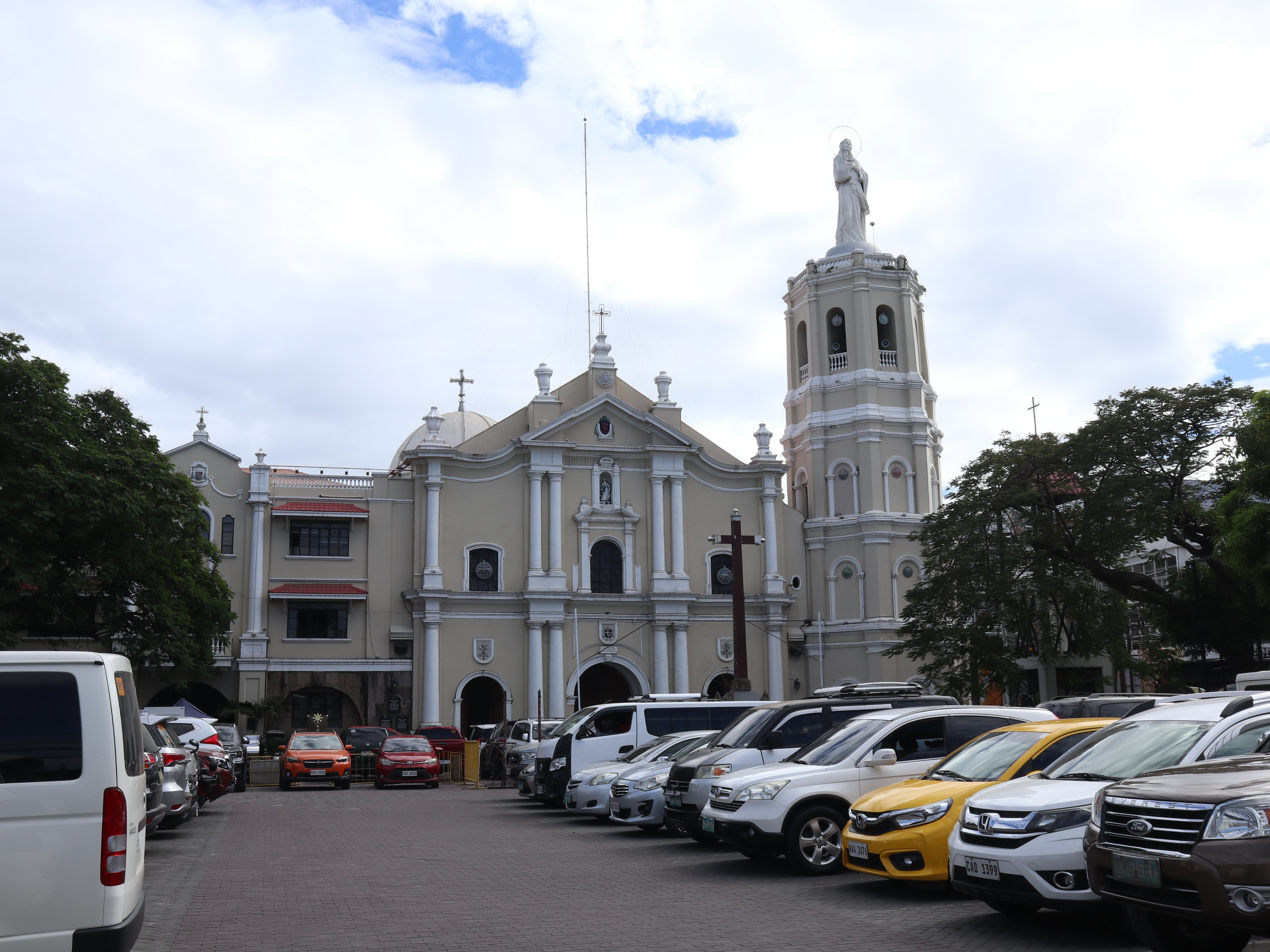
- Malolos Cathedral

- Coat of arms

Location
- Country: Philippines
- Territory: Bulacan; Valenzuela City
- Ecclesiastical province: Manila
- Coordinates: 14°50′34″N 120°48′41″E

Statistics
- Area: 2,672 km^{2} (1,032 sq mi)
- Population: Total; Catholics: (as of 2021); 4,423,868; 3,671,810 (83%)
- Parishes: 120

Information
- Denomination: Catholic
- Sui iuris church: Latin Church
- Rite: Roman Rite
- Established: December 11, 1961
- Cathedral: Cathedral-Basilica of the Immaculate Conception
- Patron saint: Immaculate Conception
- Secular priests: 206

Current leadership
- Pope: Leo XIV
- Bishop: Dennis Villarojo
- Metropolitan Archbishop: Jose Advincula
- Vicar General: Narciso S. Sampana

Website
- Diocese of Malolos

The Diocese of Malolos (Latin: Dioecesis Malolosinae; Tagalog: Diyosesis ng Malolos; Spanish: Diócesis de Malolos) is a Latin Church ecclesiastical jurisdiction or diocese of the Catholic Church in the Philippines, encompassing the whole Province of Bulacan and Valenzuela City in metropolitan Manila and is a suffragan to the metropolitan Archdiocese of Manila. The mother church of the Diocese is the Cathedral-Basilica of the Immaculate Conception located in Malolos City, Bulacan. The Blessed Virgin Mary, under the title of Immaculate Conception is the principal patroness of the diocese.

It was excised from the Archdiocese of Manila on December 11, 1961, by Pope John XXIII and was officially established on March 11, 1962, upon the installation of Manuel P. del Rosario, then-Bishop of Calbayog, by Salvatore Siino, the papal nuncio, as the first bishop of the diocese. Since August 21, 2019, the current and fifth Bishop of Malolos is Dennis C. Villarojo, who was appointed by Pope Francis on May 14, 2019.

== History ==
=== Creation of a new diocese ===
As the Church of Bulacan needed a diocese of its own, Pope John XXIII, on November 25, 1961, issued the Apostolic Constitution Christi fidelium, separating the Diocese of Malolos from the Archdiocese of Manila and establishing it as its suffragan. The present territory of the diocese is the civil province of Bulacan composed of the cities of Baliwag, Malolos, Meycauayan and San Jose del Monte, and of the towns of Angat, Balagtas, Bocaue, Bulakan, Bustos, Calumpit, Guiguinto, Hagonoy, Marilao, Norzagaray, Obando, Pandi, Paombong, Plaridel, Pulilan, San Ildefonso, San Miguel, San Rafael, Santa Maria and Valenzuela City, formerly known as Polo, was later separated from Bulacan to be a component city of Metro Manila. Doña Remedios Trinidad was then created as a town for the portion near the Sierra Madre mountains.

For the new diocese, Manuel P. del Rosario, then Bishop of Calbayog in Samar was appointed as the first Bishop of Malolos. He was jubilantly welcomed by the newly gathered Bulakeño faithful that now formed the diocese. Governor Tomas Martin and the provincial government of Bulacan were present. Del Rosario's canonical installation was presided over by then Apostolic Nuncio to the Philippines, Salvatore Siino. During his tenure, he established the Immaculate Conception Seminary (Minor) in 1962 at the Bulacan church convent, and was later transferred to the current seminary complex in Tabe, Guiguinto, Bulacan. Religious and monastic orders were soon invited to form communities here as Bulacan became a known producer of priestly and religious vocations. During this time, the diocese had eight (8) vicariates: Valenzuela, Malolos, Hagonoy, Sta. Maria, Baliuag, Meycauayan, Plaridel and San Miguel. In 1966, Del Rosario received Bishop Leopoldo A. Arcaira (+1994) as his auxiliary bishop. In 1971, Bishop Ricardo J. Vidal (who became Archbishop of Lipa, then Cebu) was appointed as coadjutor bishop due to Del Rosario's ill health.

=== The growth of the diocese ===
As Vidal was assigned as the new Archbishop of Lipa, Malolos was given a young and energetic bishop from Cavite, Cirilo Reyes Almario, Jr., who was appointed Apostolic Administrator sede plena of Malolos and then became the second Bishop of Malolos. Several developments would in fact occur during Almario's term. One of his most known is the establishment of the diocese's own major seminary, the Immaculate Conception Major Seminary. The Institute of Formation was established in 1983 with Fernando G. Gutierrez as first rector. The college department followed the next year and its theologate in 1987. ICMAS, as it is called, is Almario's greatest legacy. Today the seminary houses future priests not only from Malolos but from neighboring dioceses as well.

In 1987, Almario headed the diocese's Silver Jubilee in celebration of its 25 years as a local church. Special jubilees were held during the event such as Jubilee Days for Men, Women, Children, Priests, Religious and Seminarians. On March 11, the diocese celebrated its anniversary date with much joy and festivity. Donations for the poor were also held on the next day and preparations for the diocese's first synod was held.

On the occasion of the diocese's 25th anniversary, the first synod was held in June to July 1987, with the theme, "Prepare for the Lord a Perfect People" (Lk. 1:17) that was prepared by all the faithful as means of receiving the reform of the Second Vatican Council. Almario divided the aspects of Christian life and formed the WESTY (Worship-Evangelization-Service-Temporalities-Youth) formation. During this time, the diocese was again divided, adding another vicariate: St. Martin of Tours (Bocaue).

With Almario's resignation in 1995, then Manila Auxiliary Bishop Rolando Octavus Joven Tria Tirona was appointed as the third Bishop of Malolos. Despite his short tenure, much of his pastoral work in the Bulacan local church involved fulfilling most of the plans Almario left of, part of which is the elevation of the Malolos Cathedral into a minor basilica. During this time, the tenth vicariate of the diocese was formed, San Jose del Monte.

In December 1999, at the inauguration of the Great Jubilee Year 2000, the Diocese of Malolos witnessed the elevation of its cathedral as minor basilica granted by Pope John Paul II together with the episcopal coronation of its patroness, La Virgen Inmaculada Concepcion de Malolos.

Together with the basilica at present, there are eight (8) more shrines in the diocese: the Parish of the National Shrine of Our Lady of Fatima, Valenzuela City (1976); the National Shrine and Parish of St. Anne, Hagonoy, (1991); the National Shrine of the Divine Mercy, Marilao; the Diocesan Shrine and Parish of Sagrado Corazon de Jesus, San Rafael (2000); the Diocesan Shrine of Mary, Mother of the Eucharist & Grace, Sta. Maria (2006); the Diocesan Shrine of Nuestra Señora de la Inmaculada Concepcion de Salambao, Obando (2007); the Diocesan Shrine of Mahal na Poon ng Krus sa Wawa in Bocaue (2008) and the Diocesan Shrine and Parish of St. John the Baptist, Calumpit (2013).

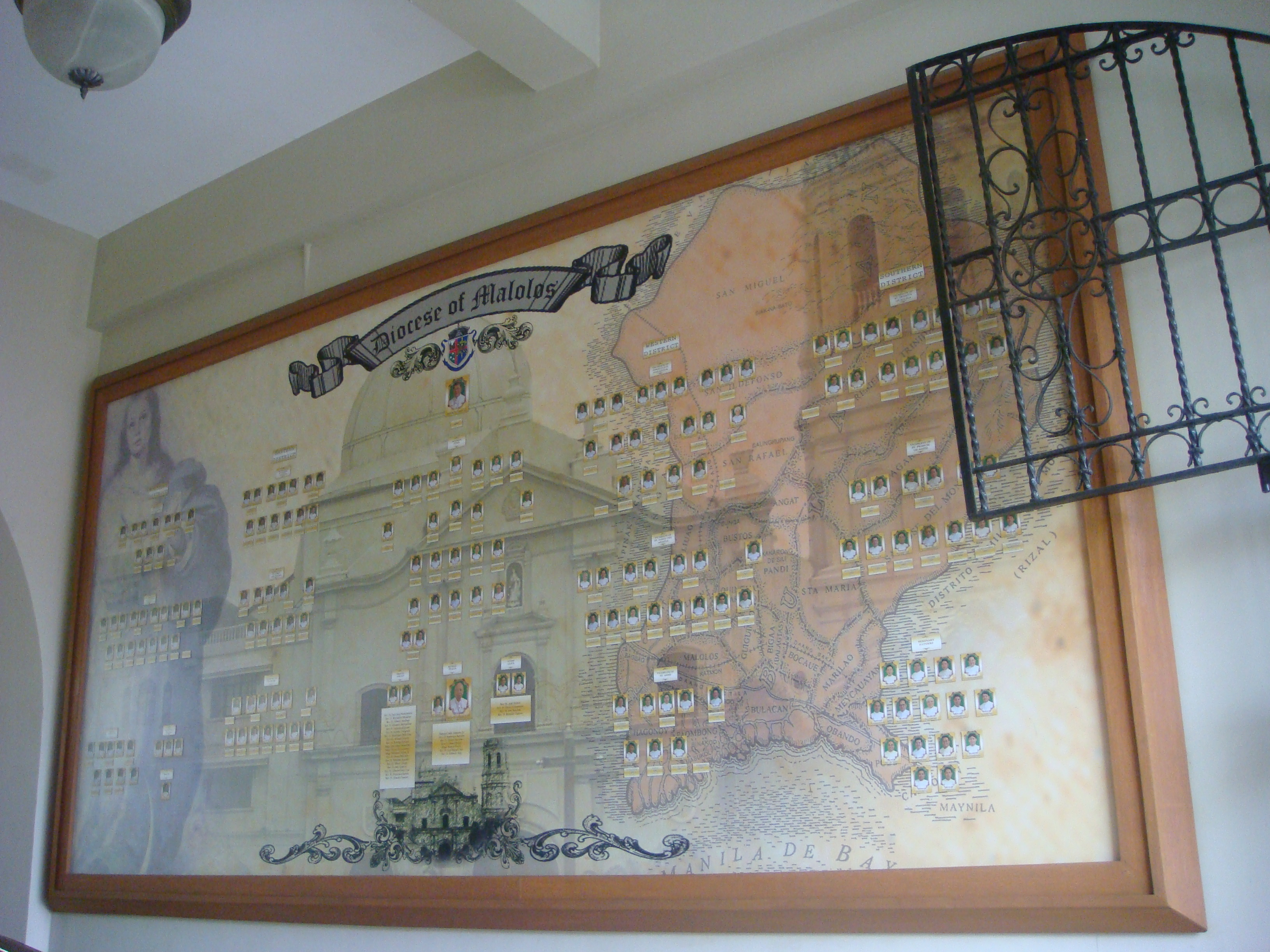
Diocese of Malolos' present Organizational chart photo in the convent.

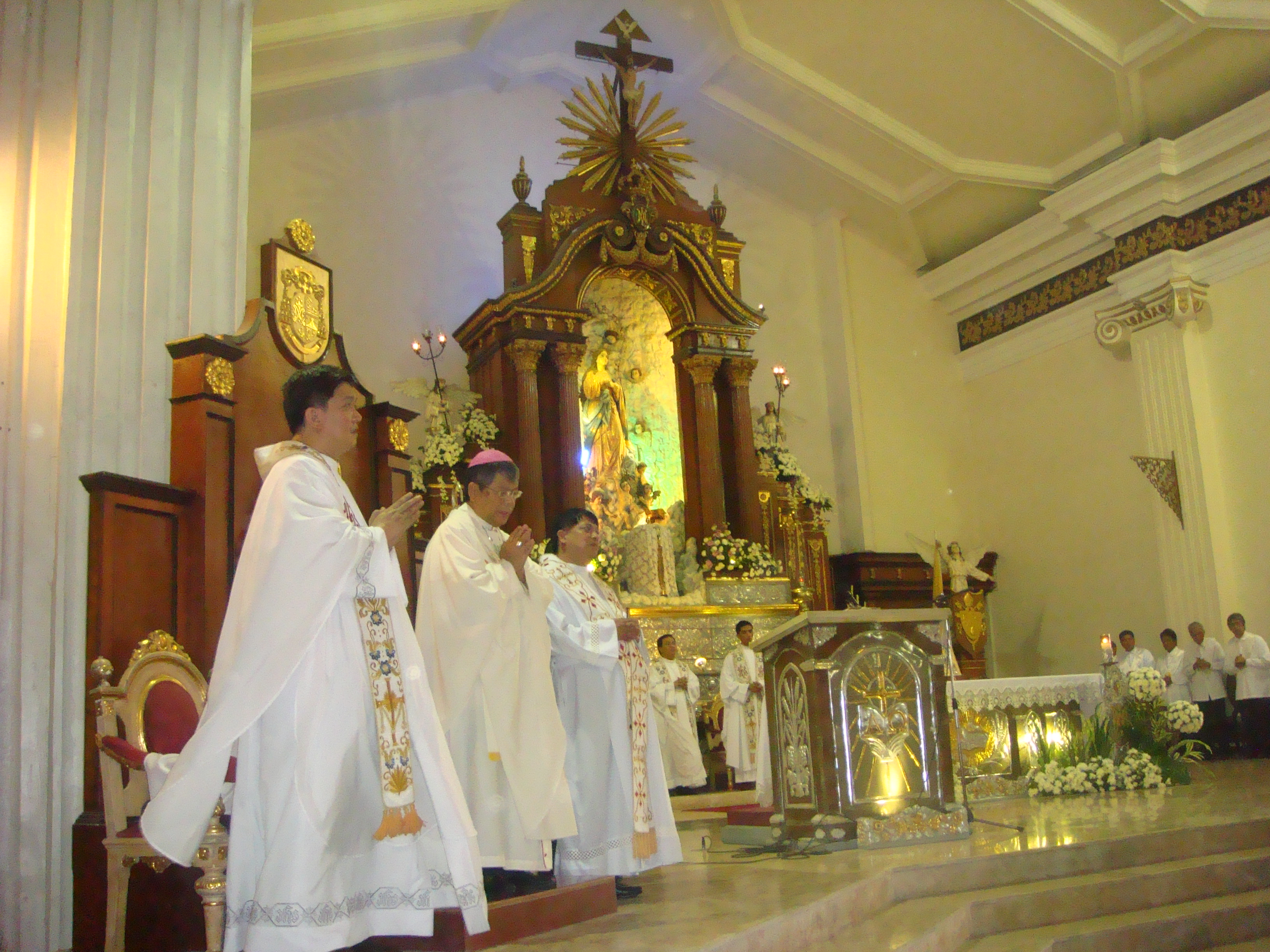
The Diocese's fourth Bishop José Francisco Oliveros, in a solemn Mass at the Malolos Cathedral.

=== The Golden Jubilee 2012 ===
In 2004, Jose Francisco Oliveros, then Bishop of Boac, replaced Bishop Tirona, who would later be assigned as Prelate of Infanta and then Archbishop of Caceres. Oliveros became Apostolic Administrator sede vacante before assuming office. It was in his term that the Diocese of Malolos prepared for its Golden Jubilee. During his time, the diocese was divided into four ecclesiastical districts (West, East, South and North).

The diocese had five preparatory years dedicated to the priests, religious, laity and the youth of the Diocese. During the journey of the Diocese, the Jubilee Cross and the replica image of La Virgen Inmaculada Concepcion de Malolos joined the community in its journey towards the different religious, social, cultural and beneficial gatherings held during the five-year preparation, which was a remarkable opportunity for people to renew their faith in the Lord.

The diocese fulfilled four jubilee projects: the Jubilee Shelter Program in Plaridel, Bulacan under the Commission on Social Action, for those who need homes due to the devastation of Typhoon Ondoy; the Diocesan Pastoral Center in Malolos City under the Diocesan Curia; the Diocesan Formation Center in Guiguinto, Bulacan, under the Commission on Formation for different seminars and events of the Diocese and the Bahay Pastoral in San Ildefonso, Bulacan, a home for retired and sickly priests.

Oliveros remained in office until 11 May 2018 when he was received into the hands of the Creator. He is the first Bishop of Malolos to die in office. The Diocese of Malolos then came into sede vacante. Pope Francis assigned the diocese temporarily to the current Bishop of the Diocese of Cubao, Honesto F. Ongtioco, as the Apostolic Administrator of Malolos, from 11 May 2018 to 21 August 2019 upon the installation of the 5th and current bishop of Malolos, Dennis C. Villarojo.

=== Present ===
On May 14, 2019, Pope Francis appointed then Auxiliary Bishop of the Archdiocese of Cebu and Titular Bishop of Gisipa, Dennis C. Villarojo, as the fifth Bishop of Malolos. Villarojo once served as personal secretary to the late Cardinal Ricardo Vidal who was former Coadjutor Bishop of Malolos. He was canonically installed at the Malolos Cathedral-Basilica on August 21, 2019, by then Manila Archbishop Luis Antonio G. Tagle and Apostolic Nuncio, Gabriele G. Caccia, marking a new chapter in the history of the Diocese of Malolos.

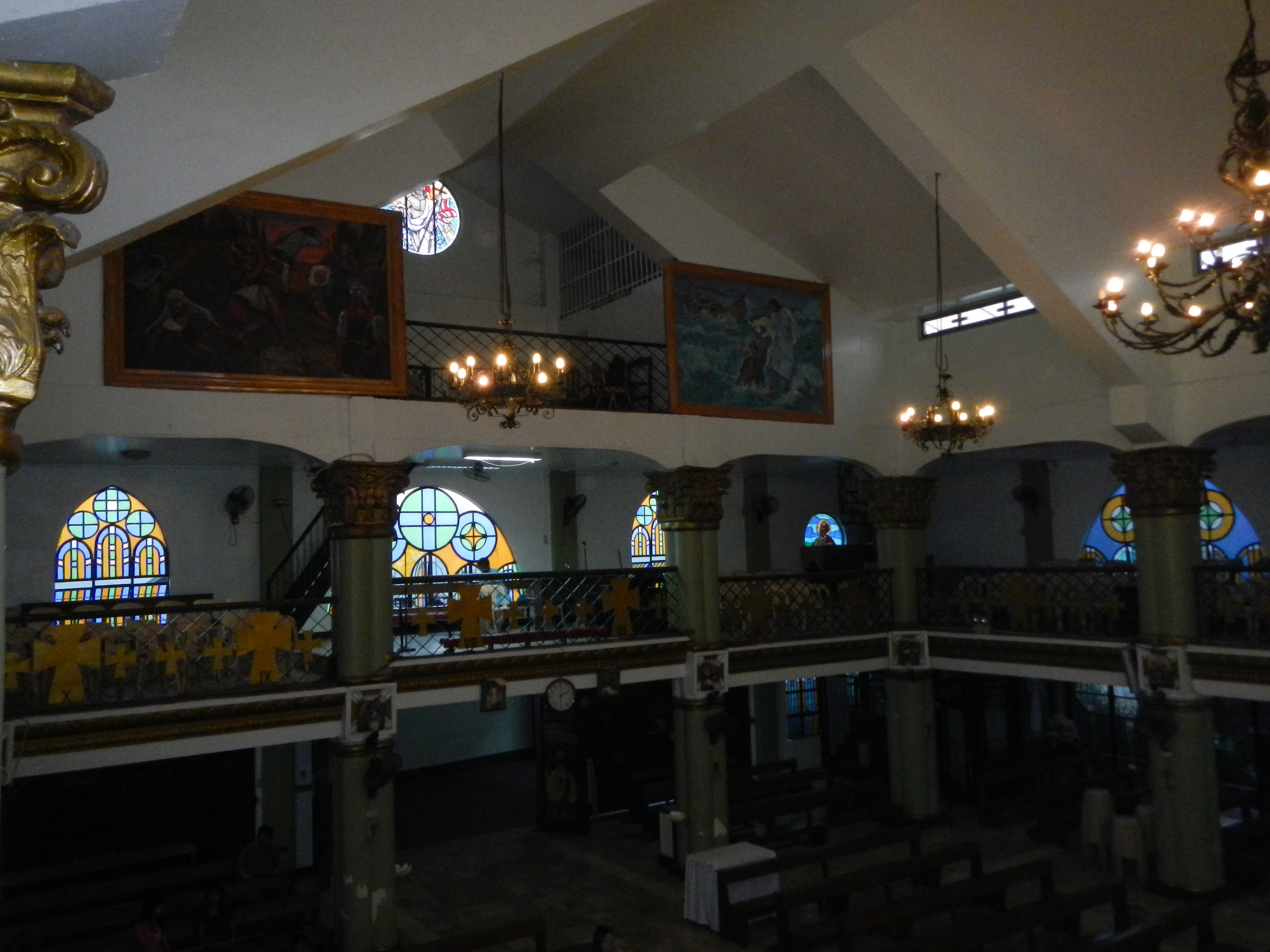
Saint Peter the Apostle Church (San Jose del Monte) balcony-gallery in 2015

In February 2020, Pope Francis granted the canonical coronation of the image of La Purisima Concepcion in Santa Maria, Bulacan and in September 2021, he also granted the diocese a new minor basilica, the Minor Basilica of La Purisima Concepcion, Santa Maria, where the image is enshrined.

On March 11, 2022, the diocese celebrated its 60th anniversary with a Mass presided by the Apostolic Nuncio to the Philippines, Charles John Brown Also in the ceremonies were the two surviving bishops of Malolos, Dennis Villarojo, and Caceres Archbishop Rolando Tria Tirona, and bishops who served or came from the diocese.

On February 27 up to March 2, 2023, the diocese hosted the 29th Canon Law Society of the Philippines [CLSP] National Convention.

On February 14, 2024, Luneta Morales, a choir member, 83 years old was killed due to chest injuries while 63 attendees suffered multiple injuries when the "Vicariate of Saint Joseph" Saint Peter the Apostle Church (San Jose del Monte, Bulacan) 30-year old balcony-gallery, weakened by infesting termites collapsed during an Ash Wednesday service past 7 a.m. Dennis Villarojo said "those affected and their families are being assisted by the Diocese of Malolos with then-parish priest Fr. Romulo Perez and then-parochial vicar Fr. Divino Cayanan.

== List of parishes and shrines ==
Vicariate of the Immaculate Conception

- Immaculate Conception Parish-Cathedral and Minor Basilica - Malolos, Bulacan
- Diocesan Shrine and Parish of Nuestra Señora de la Asuncion - Camino Real St., San Jose, Bulakan, Bulacan
- Nuestra Señora del Carmen Parish (Barasoain Church) - Paseo Del Congreso, San Gabriel, Malolos, Bulacan
- St. Elizabeth of Hungary Parish - Bagong Bayan (Sta. Isabel), Malolos, Bulacan
- Parokya ng San Isidro Labrador - Bambang, Bulakan, Bulacan
- Stella Maris Mission-Parish - Pamarawan, Malolos, Bulacan
- St. Joseph the Worker Parish - Panasahan, Malolos, Bulacan
- Parish of the Holy Spirit - Malolos Heights, Bulihan, Malolos, Bulacan
- Hearts of Jesus and Mary Parish - San Felipe Subdivision, Mojon, Malolos, Bulacan
- Parish of Santisima Trinidad - Santisima Trinidad, Malolos, Bulacan
- Our Lady of the Lord's Presentation Parish - Maunlad Homes, Mojon, Malolos, Bulacan
- San Isidro Labrador Parish - Bantayan 1st., Bulihan, Malolos, Bulacan

Vicariate of St. Anne

- National Shrine and Parish of St. Anne - Hagonoy, Bulacan
- Parokya ng Santiago Apostol - Poblacion, Paombong, Bulacan
- Parokya ni San Antonio de Padua - Iba, Hagonoy, 3002 Bulacan
- Parish of St. Helena the Empress - Sta. Elena, Hagonoy, Bulacan
- Parokya ng San Juan Bautista - San Juan, Hagonoy, Bulacan
- Parokya ng San Jose, Manggagawa - San Jose, Calumpit, Bulacan
- Parokya ng Nuestra Señora Del Santisimo Rosario - Sto. Rosario, Hagonoy, Bulacan
- Sta. Cruz Mission-Parish - Sta. Cruz, Paombong, Bulacan
- Parokya ng Ina ng Laging Saklolo - San Pedro, Hagonoy, Bulacan

Vicariate of St. James The Apostle

- St. James the Apostle Parish - Poblacion, Plaridel, Bulacan
- Diocesan Shrine and Parish of St. John The Baptist - Poblacion, Calumpit, Bulacan
- St. Ildephonse of Toledo Parish - Poblacion, Guiguinto, Bulacan
- Diocesan Shrine and Parish of San Isidro Labrador - Poblacion, Pulilan, Bulacan
- St. Michael the Archangel Parish - Dampol, Plaridel, Bulacan
- Parokya ng San Marcos Ebanghelista - San Marcos, Calumpit, Bulacan
- Pandiyosesis na Dambana at Parokya ni Sta. Rita de Cascia - Sta. Rita, Guiguinto, Bulacan
- Nuestra Señora del Rosario Parish - Tiaong-Pulong Gubat (Bacood), Guiguinto, Bulacan
- Our Lady of the Miraculous Medal Parish - Esguerra St., Peñabatan, Pulilan, Bulacan
- Parokya ng Banal na Mag-Anak - Violeta Village, Sta. Cruz, Guiguinto, Bulacan
- Parokya ng mga Banal Na Anghel - San Jose, Plaridel, Bulacan
- Sto. Niño Parish - Sto. Niño, Calumpit, Bulacan
- Quasi-Parish of St. John Mary Vianney - C. Mercado St., Tabe, Guiguinto, Bulacan

Vicariate of St. Augustine

- Diocesan Shrine and Parish of Saint Augustine - Poblacion, Baliwag, Bulacan
- Sta. Monica Parish - Angat, Bulacan
- Parokya ng San Juan de Dios - Poblacion, San Rafael, Bulacan
- Sto. Niño Parish - C.L. Hilario Highway, Poblacion, Bustos, Bulacan
- St. Paul the Apostle Parish - F. Illescas St., Niugan, Angat, Bulacan
- Our Lady of the Most Holy Rosary - Makinabang, Baliwag, Bulacan
- San Isidro Labrador Parish - Liciada, Bustos, Bulacan
- Sagrada Familia Parish - B.S. Aquino Ave., Tangos, Baliwag, Bulacan
- Our Lady of Mt. Carmel Parish - Rio Vista Subdivision, Sabang, Baliwag, Bulacan
- Nuestra Señora de Lourdes Parish - Pulong Sampaloc, Doña Remedios Trinidad, Bulacan
- Sto. Cristo Parish - Caingin, San Rafael, Bulacan
- Nuestra Señora de las Flores Parish - Virgen Delas Flores, Baliwag, Bulacan
- Sta. Rita de Cascia Parish - Binagbag, Angat, Bulacan
- Parokya ng Pag-akyat sa Langit ni Hesukristo - Sto. Cristo, Pulilan, Bulacan
- Parokya ng Inmaculada Concepcion - Vergel de Dios St. Cor P. Guzman St., Concepcion, Baliwag, Bulacan
- Immaculate Conception Quasi-Parish - Marungko, Angat, Bulacan

Vicariate of St. Michael The Archangel

- Diocesan Shrine and Parish of San Miguel Arcangel - Poblacion, San Miguel, Bulacan
- Parokya ng San Ildefonso de Toledo - Poblacion, San Ildefonso, Bulacan
- Pandiyosesis na Dambana at Parokya ng Sagrado Corazon de Jesus - Cruz na Daan, San Rafael, Bulacan
- Nuestra Señora de los Remedios Parish - Sibul Springs, San Miguel, Bulacan
- Sacred Heart of Jesus Parish - Salacot, San Miguel, Bulacan
- Parokya ng Kamahalmahalang Puso ni Jesus - Pinaod, San Ildefonso, Bulacan
- Parokya ng San Jose, Esposo de Maria - San Jose, San Miguel, Bulacan
- Parokya ng Mahal na Birhen ng Sto. Rosario - Malipampang, San Ildefonso, Bulacan
- Parish of the Most Holy Eucharist - Gabihan, San Ildefonso, Bulacan
- Kalawakan Catholic Mission - Kalawakan, Doña Remedios Trinidad, Bulacan

Vicariate of St. Martin of Tours

- St. Martin of Tours Parish and Diocesan Shrine of Mahal na Poon ng Krus sa Wawa - Poblacion, Bocaue, Bulacan
- Parokya ni San Lorenzo, Diyakono at Martir - Longos, Balagtas, Bulacan
- Parokya ng San Miguel Arkanghel - Poblacion, Marilao, Bulacan
- Nuestro Señor Jesucristo Parish and Diocesan Shrine of St. Andrew Kim Tae-gon - Lolomboy, Bocaue, Bulacan
- Parokya ng San Pedro de Alcantara - Taal, Bocaue, Bulacan
- Parokya ng Mahal na Birhen ng Fatima - Meralco Village, Lias, Marilao, Bulacan
- Parokya ni San Pedro Apostol - Borol 2nd, Balagtas, Bulacan
- National Shrine and Parish of the Divine Mercy - Sta. Rosa I, Marilao, Bulacan
- Parokya ni San Jose Manggagawa - Panginay, Balagtas, Bulacan
- Mother of Mercy Quasi-Parish - Loma De Gato, Marilao, Bulacan

Vicariate of Saint Joseph

- Saint Joseph the Worker Parish - Poblacion I, San Jose Del Monte, Bulacan
- Our Lady of the Most Holy Rosary Parish - Minuyan IV, San Jose Del Monte, Bulacan
- Saint Peter the Apostle Parish - Tungkong Mangga, San Jose Del Monte, Bulacan
- Most Sacred Heart of Jesus Parish - Francisco Homes Narra, San Jose Del Monte, Bulacan
- San Isidro Labrador Parish - Muzon, San Jose Del Monte, Bulacan
- Parokya ng San Lorenzo Ruiz de Manila - Pleasant Hill Subdivision, San Manuel, San Jose Del Monte, Bulacan
- Christ the King Parish - San Rafael III (Area H), San Jose Del Monte, Bulacan
- Sagrada Familia Parish - Sta. Cruz I (Area D), San Jose Del Monte, Bulacan
- Our Lady of Guadalupe Parish - Deca Homes, Loma de Gato, Marilao, Bulacan
- Virgen de las Flores Parish - Bigte, Norzagaray, Bulacan
- Sto. Cristo Quasi-Parish - Sto. Cristo, San Jose Del Monte, Bulacan
- Quasi-Parish of Our Lady of La Salette - Mt. View Subd., Muzon, San Jose Del Monte, Bulacan
- Quasi-Parish of Our Lady of Assumption - EVR Ave., Assumption, San Jose Del Monte, Bulacan
- Mother of Perpetual Help Quasi-Parish - Gaya-Gaya, San Jose Del Monte, Bulacan

Vicariate of La Purisima Concepcion

- Minor Basilica and Parish of La Purisima Concepcion - Poblacion, Santa Maria, Bulacan
- Parokya ni San Andres Apostol - Poblacion, Norzagaray, Bulacan
- Immaculate Conception Parish - Poblacion, Pandi, Bulacan
- Our Lady of Mount Carmel Parish - Pulong Buhangin, Santa Maria, Bulacan
- Parokya ni Sto. Niño - Parada, Santa Maria, Bulacan
- Parokya ng Sto. Cristo - Siling Bata, Pandi, Bulacan
- Parokya ni San Gabriel Arkanghel - San Gabriel, Santa Maria, Bulacan
- Blessed Sacrament Parish - Cay Pombo, Santa Maria, Bulacan
- Holy Family Parish - Catmon, Santa Maria, Bulacan
- Parokya ng San Juan Apostol at Ebanghelista - Bagbaguin, Santa Maria, Bulacan
- Parish and Diocesan Shrine of Mary, Mother of the Eucharist and Grace - San Vicente, Santa Maria, Bulacan
- San Isidro Labrador Parish - Partida, Pulong Buhangin, Santa Maria, Bulacan
- Quasi-Parish of Saint Anthony of Padua - Manatal, Pandi, Bulacan

Vicariate of St. Francis of Assisi

- Parish of Saint Francis of Assisi - Poblacion, Meycauayan, Bulacan
- San Pascual Baylon Parish and National Shrine of Nuestra Señora de la Inmaculada Concepcion de Salambao - Pag-asa, Obando, Bulacan
- Parokya ng Sta. Cruz - Paco, Obando, Bulacan
- Parokya ni San Isidro Labrador - Malhacan, Meycauayan, Bulacan
- Nuestra Señora de Salambao Mission-Parish - Binuangan, Obando, Bulacan
- Parokya ng Santo Niño - Sto. Niño Village, Camalig, Meycauayan, Bulacan
- St. Joseph the Worker Parish - Topaz Drive, St. Francis Village, Pandayan, Meycauayan, Bulacan
- Our Lady of Fatima Parish - Heritage Homes, Loma de Gato, Marilao, Bulacan
- Parokya ng Muling Pagkabuhay - Lawa, Meycauayan, Bulacan
- Parokya ng San Bartolome, Apostol - Tugatog, Meycauayan, Bulacan
- Our Lady of the Holy Rosary Quasi-Parish - Genesis St., Metrogate Complex, Pandayan, Meycauayan, Bulacan

Vicariate of San Diego De Alcala

- Parokya ni San Diego de Alcala - Polo, Valenzuela City
- Parish of the National Shrine of Our Lady of Fatima - Fatima Avenue, Marulas, Valenzuela City
- Parokya ni San Isidro Labrador - Km. 14 MacArthur Hiway, Malinta, Valenzuela City
- Our Lady of the Holy Rosary Parish - G. Marcelo St., Maysan, Valenzuela City
- Sto. Cristo Parish - 102 Kasaganahan St., Marulas, Valenzuela City
- Parish of the Holy Cross - Gen. T. de Leon, Valenzuela City
- Parish of the Risen Lord - 222 T. Santiago St., Veinte Reales, Valenzuela City
- Hearts of Jesus and Mary Parish - I. Fernando St., Malanday, Valenzuela City
- Parokya ni San Juan de la Cruz - F. Bautista St., Ugong, Valenzuela City
- Parokya ng Banal na Mag-Anak - A. Pablo St., Karuhatan, Valenzuela City
- Saint Joseph the Worker Parish - San Baraquiel St., Punturin, Valenzuela City
- Our Lady of Lourdes Quasi-Parish - 0914 Gitnang St., Bignay, Valenzuela City

== Ordinaries ==
=== Bishops ===
No.	Name and Coat of Arms	Period in Position	Appointed By	Ordained by	Notes
1	Manuel Platon del Rosario (1915–2009)	March 11, 1967 – December 15, 1977; 10 years, 9 months and 4 days	Paul VI	Pedro Paulo Santos (Caceres)	Del Rosario resigned in 1977 after suffering a stroke while attending the Second Vatican Council in Rome that left him paralyzed. He died in 2009.
2	Cirilo Reyes Almario Jr. (1931–2016)	December 15, 1977 – January 20, 1996; 18 years, 1 month and 5 days	Paul VI	Alejandro Olalia (Lipa)	The longest serving bishop of the Diocese of Malolos for eighteen years and one month. He resigned from the position in 1996 due to failing health. He's well known for founding the Immaculate Conception Major and Minor Seminaries in Guiguinto and the Immaculate Conception School for Boys in 1989. He died in 2016.
Upon the resignation of Almario, the Archbishop of Caceres Leonardo Zamora Legaspi was appointed apostolic administrator of the Diocese during its period of sede vacante. He served as apostolic administrator until the appointment of Rolando Tria Tirona as the third ordinary of the Diocese on December 14, 1996. The latter would ultimately succeed him in 2012 as Archbishop of Caceres.
3	Rolando Octavus Joven Tria Tirona (1946–)	December 14, 1996 – June 28, 2003; 6 years, 6 months and 14 days	John Paul II	Anastasio Ballestrero (Turin)	Tirona is the shortest serving ordinary of the Diocese of Malolos with an official term of six years and six months. He was appointed apostolic administrator following the resignation of Almario. In 2003, he was appointed the Prelate of the Territorial Prelature of Infanta and the latter Archbishop of the Archdiocese of Cáceres in 2012. He is the only living bishop-emeritus of Malolos.
Upon the transition of Tirona to the Prelature of Infanta, Jose Francisco Oliveros, who was the Bishop of the Diocese of Boac was appointed apostolic administrator and eventually was appointed as the next ordinary of Malolos on August 5, 2004.
4	Jose Francisco Oliveros (1946–2018)	August 5, 2004 – May 11, 2018; 13 years, 9 months and 6 days	John Paul II	Giovanni Battista Montini (Rome)	Oliveros is the only ordinary from the Diocese of Malolos thus far to be ordained by the sitting pontiff. He is the second-longest serving ordinary of the Dioecese from 2004 to 2018. He died while in office in 2018, the first ordinary to do so.
Upon the death of Oliveros, Diocese of Cubao (formerly Balanga) Bishop Honesto Ongtioco was appointed apostolic administrator during the Sede vacante period of the diocese that lasted for one year and four months on May 16, 2018. He returned to primary governance of the Diocese of Cubao following the canonical installation of Cebu's auxiliary bishop Dennis Villarojo as the succeeding ordinary to the Diocese.
5	Dennis Cabanada Villarojo (1967–)	August 21, 2019 – present 8 years, 2 months and 26 days	Francis	Jaime Sin (Manila)	Villarojo is the present ordinary of the Diocese of Malolos. He is the first among the ordinaries to have come from the Archdiocese of Cebu, formerly serving as an Auxiliary bishop to Archbishop José S. Palma.

=== Coadjutor Bishops ===
The Diocese of Malolos received two coadjutor bishops in its history with one of them being transitioning to the Archdiocese of Lipa and the other being appointed to the ordinary see of Malolos.

No.	Name and Coat of Arms	Period in Position	Appointed By	Ordained by	Notes
1	Ricardo Tito Jamin Vidal (1931–2017)	September 10, 1971 – August 22, 1973; 1 year, 11 months and 12 days	Paul VI	Alfredo Obviar (Lucena)	Vidal was appointed the first coadjutor bishop in 1971 by Pope Paul VI in an aide to then bishop Manuel del Rosario. He later transitioned in 1973 as the new ordinary to the Archdiocese of Lipa and in the latter, a part of the consistory, being elevated to the cardinalate in 1985. He was later the archbishop of Cebu until his retirement in 2010. He died in 2017
2	Cirilo Reyes Almario Jr. (1931–2016)	August 22, 1973 – December 15, 1977; 4 years, 3 months and 22 days	Paul VI	Alejandro Olalia (Lipa)	Almario is the longest serving and the most recent coadjutor bishop of the Diocese of Malolos, replacing Vidal after his transition to the archdiocese of Lipa. He served for four years under the guidance of Bishop Manuel del Rosario. He was elevated to the ordinary seat in 1977 upon the resignation of del Rosario.

=== Auxiliary Bishops ===
The Diocese of Malolos had three auxiliary bishops in its history as a diocese. The most recent auxiliary bishop is Deogracias Iñiguez, the bishop-emeritus of the Diocese of Kalookan.

No.	Name and Coat of Arms	Period in Position	Appointed By	Ordained by	Notes
1	Leopoldo Arayata Arcaira (1902–1994)	October 17, 1966 – January 25, 1988; 21 years, 3 months and 8 days	Paul VI	Rufino Santos (Manila)	Arcaira previously served as the auxiliary bishop to the Diocese of Zamboanga before being appointed as auxiliary bishop to the Diocese of Malolos. He is the longest serving auxiliary bishop for the Diocese lasting for twenty-one years before his retirement in 1988. He died just six years later.
2	Leoncio Leviste Lat (1917–2002)	October 30, 1980 – 1985 approx. 4 years	John Paul II	Bruno Torpigliani (Malliana)	Lat concurrently served as auxiliary bishop with Arcaira to the Diocese of Malolos. In 1980, he was appointed auxiliary bishop to the Diocese and served for an approximate four years before being appointed as auxiliary bishop of Manila in 1985. He retired in 1992 and died in 2002.
3	Deogracias Soriano Iñiguez Jr. (1946–)	July 3, 1985 – December 27, 1989; 4 years, 5 months and 24 days	John Paul II	Bruno Torpigliani (Malliana)	Iñiguez was a parish priest at the Diocese of Malolos and was ordained as such in 1963. He is the only parish priest to serve as auxiliary bishop to his mother diocese during his tenure from 1985 to 1989. He concurrently served as auxiliary bishop with both Arcaira and Lat. He was appointed Bishop of the Diocese of Iba in 1989 and in the latter, Bishop of Kalookan in 2003. He resigned in 2013 and remains the only living auxiliary bishop-emeritus of the Diocese.

== Incardinated Priests of the diocese who became bishops ==
- Deogracias S. Iñiguez: 1985–1989, Auxiliary Bishop of Malolos, then Bishop of Iba, now Bishop-Emeritus of Caloocan
- Bartolome G. Santos: from Santa Maria, former Vicar-General, now fifth Bishop of Iba

== See also ==
- Catholic Church in the Philippines
