= Manuel del Rosario =

Filipino prelate (1915-2009)

The Most Reverend Manuel Platon del Rosario D.D.
- 1st Bishop of Malolos
- See: Malolos
- Appointed: 11 December 1961
- In office: 11 March 1962 - 15 December 1977
- Predecessor: Diocese Established
- Successor: Cirilo R. Almario, Jr., D.D.
- Other posts: Bishop of Calbayog; Titular Bishop of Zerta

Orders
- Ordination: 25 March 1939 by Pedro Paulo S. Santos, D.D.
- Consecration: 25 July 1955 by Pedro Paulo S. Santos, D.D.

Personal details
- Born: Manuel Platon del Rosario; July 1, 1915 Baao, Camarines Sur, Philippine Islands
- Died: March 23, 2009 (aged 93) Guiguinto, Bulacan
- Buried: Malolos Cathedral Crypt
- Denomination: Roman Catholic
- Education: Baao Elementary School; Provincial Normal School; Holy Rosary Minor Seminary
- Alma mater: University of Santo Tomas Central Seminary
- Motto: Anima Mea Pro Ovibus (My life for my sheep)
- Coat of arms: Manuel Platon del Rosario's coat of arms

Styles of Manuel P. del Rosario
- Reference style: The Most Reverend
- Spoken style: Your Excellency
- Religious style: Bishop

Manuel Platon Del Rosario (July 1, 1915 – March 23, 2009) was a Filipino prelate of the Roman Catholic Church. At the time of his death, Del Rosario was the oldest Filipino bishop and one of the oldest Catholic bishops. He was succeeded by Manuel Sobreviñas, D.D., Bishop-Emeritus of Imus as the oldest Filipino living bishop and oldest to die at the age of 96 in 2020.

== Biography ==
Del Rosario was born in Baao, Camarines Sur (then a part of Ambos Camarines), Philippines in 1915, and was ordained a priest on March 25, 1939. He was appointed Coadjutor Bishop of the Diocese of Calbayog and appointed Titular bishop of Zerta on May 24, 1955, and was ordained a bishop on July 25, 1955. He succeeded the bishop of Calbayog on July 25, 1958, and was later appointed bishop of the newly created Diocese of Malolos on December 11, 1961, and installed on March 11, 1962. He also founded the Immaculate Conception Seminary in Tabe, Guiguinto.

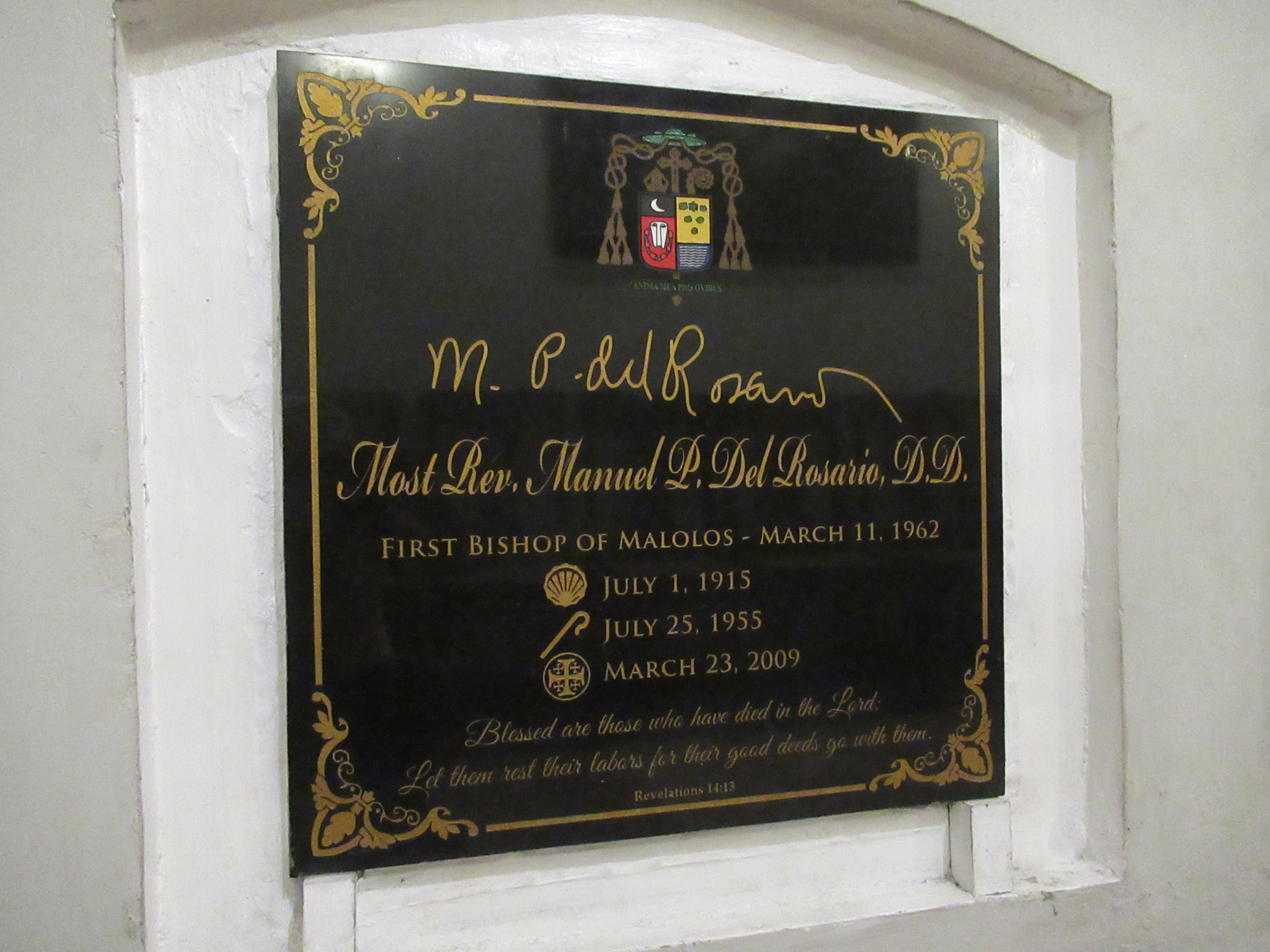
Malolos Cathedral Crypt

In 1963, Del Rosario suffered a stroke while attending the Second Vatican Council in Rome, leaving him paralyzed and using a wheelchair. Del Rosario resigned as bishop of Malolos for health reasons on December 15, 1977, and was succeeded by Bishop Cirilo Almario.

He died of pneumonia on March 23, 2009.

== See also ==
- Roman Catholic Diocese of Malolos
- Roman Catholic Diocese of Calbayog

Catholic Church titles
New diocese	Bishop of Malolos; March 11, 1962 – December 15, 1977	Succeeded by Cirilo R. Almario, Jr.
