= National Shrine of the Divine Mercy (Philippines) =

Roman Catholic church in Bulacan, Philippines

Divine Mercy Shrine
- National Shrine and Parish of the Divine Mercy
- Pambansáng Dambana at Parokya ng Banal na Awa (Filipino)
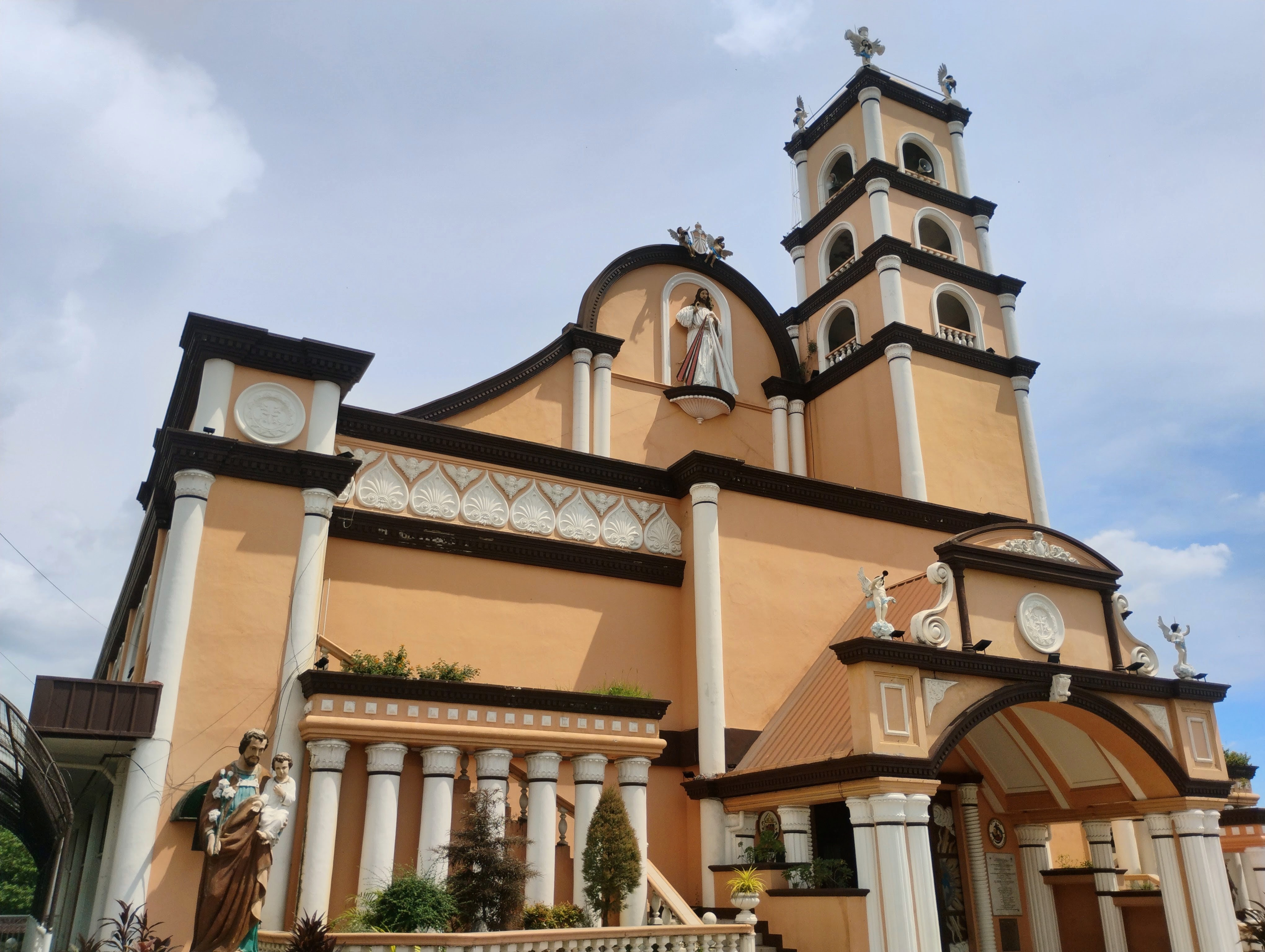

- Location in Bulacan Location in Luzon Location in the Philippines
- 14°46′43″N 120°58′29″E
- Location: Brgy. Sta. Rosa 1, Marilao, Bulacan
- Country: Philippines
- Denomination: Roman Catholic
- Website: nationalshrineofthedivinemercy.org.ph

History
- Status: Parish Church and National Shrine
- Founder: Vicente Robles
- Dedication: Divine Mercy
- Consecrated: November 30, 1994

Architecture
- Functional status: Active
- Architectural type: Church building
- Style: Modern
- Groundbreaking: April 26, 1992
- Completed: November 29, 1994

Specifications
- Materials: Sand, gravel, cement, mortar and steel

Administration
- Province: Manila
- Archdiocese: Manila
- Diocese: Malolos

Clergy
- Archbishop: Jose Lazaro Fuerte Advincula Jr.
- Bishop: Dennis Cabanada Villarojo
- Rector: Alvin P. Pila
- Vicar: Aidref R. Ronquillo
- Priest: Romulo M. Perez

The National Shrine and Parish of the Divine Mercy is a Roman Catholic church dedicated to the Divine Mercy in Marilao, Bulacan, the Philippines. It is under the jurisdiction of the Diocese of Malolos. It was elevated to the status of National Shrine by Archbishop Orlando Quevedo of the Catholic Bishops Conference of the Philippines. The first Mass was held at the site on February 2, 1992, the Feast of the Presentation. Monsignor Ranilo Santos Trillana, PC, EV, was its Rector and parish priest until his death from prostate cancer on September 11, 2024.

== Features ==
The Guadalupe Chapel in the church’s basement has a replica of the tilmahtli bearing Our Lady of Guadalupe, near which is flowing water many pilgrims collect as they consider it miraculous.

Behind the church is a Calvary with life-sized statues of the Stations of the Cross. Nearby are the Rosary Hill; the Grotto of Our Lady of Lourdes where people can pray for good health; and the Grotto of the Resurrection.

The Saint Faustina Hall is an auditorium where Sunday Masses are also held to accommodate any overflow of pilgrims in the main church.

The Little Poland Museum has replicas of the house and basement where later Pope John Paul II lived; the Vilnius convent chapel where Faustina Kowalska had a vision of the Divine Mercy; and the Auschwitz prison cell where Maximillian Kolbe was martyred in 1941.

== Gallery ==
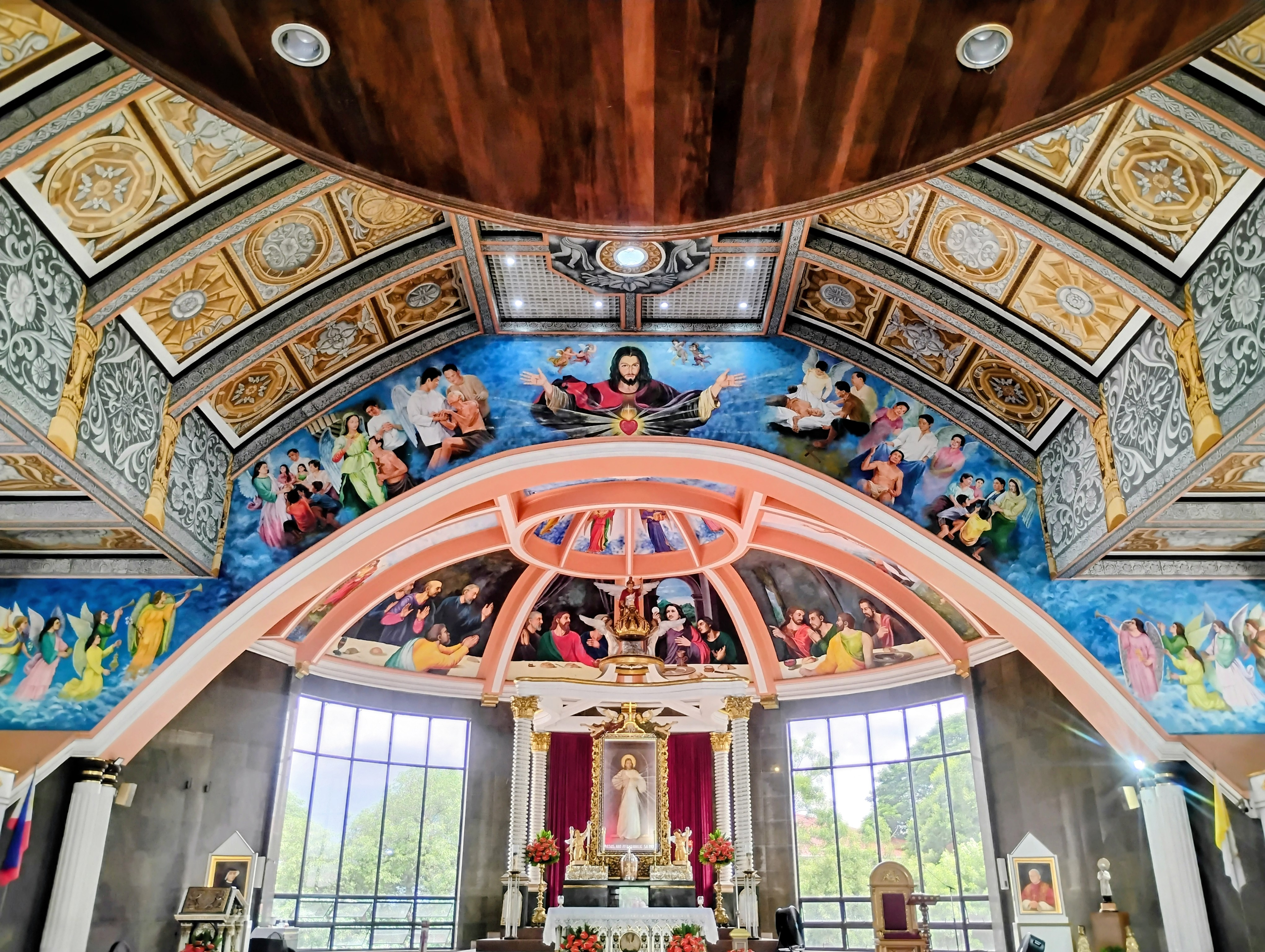
Interior of the Main Church

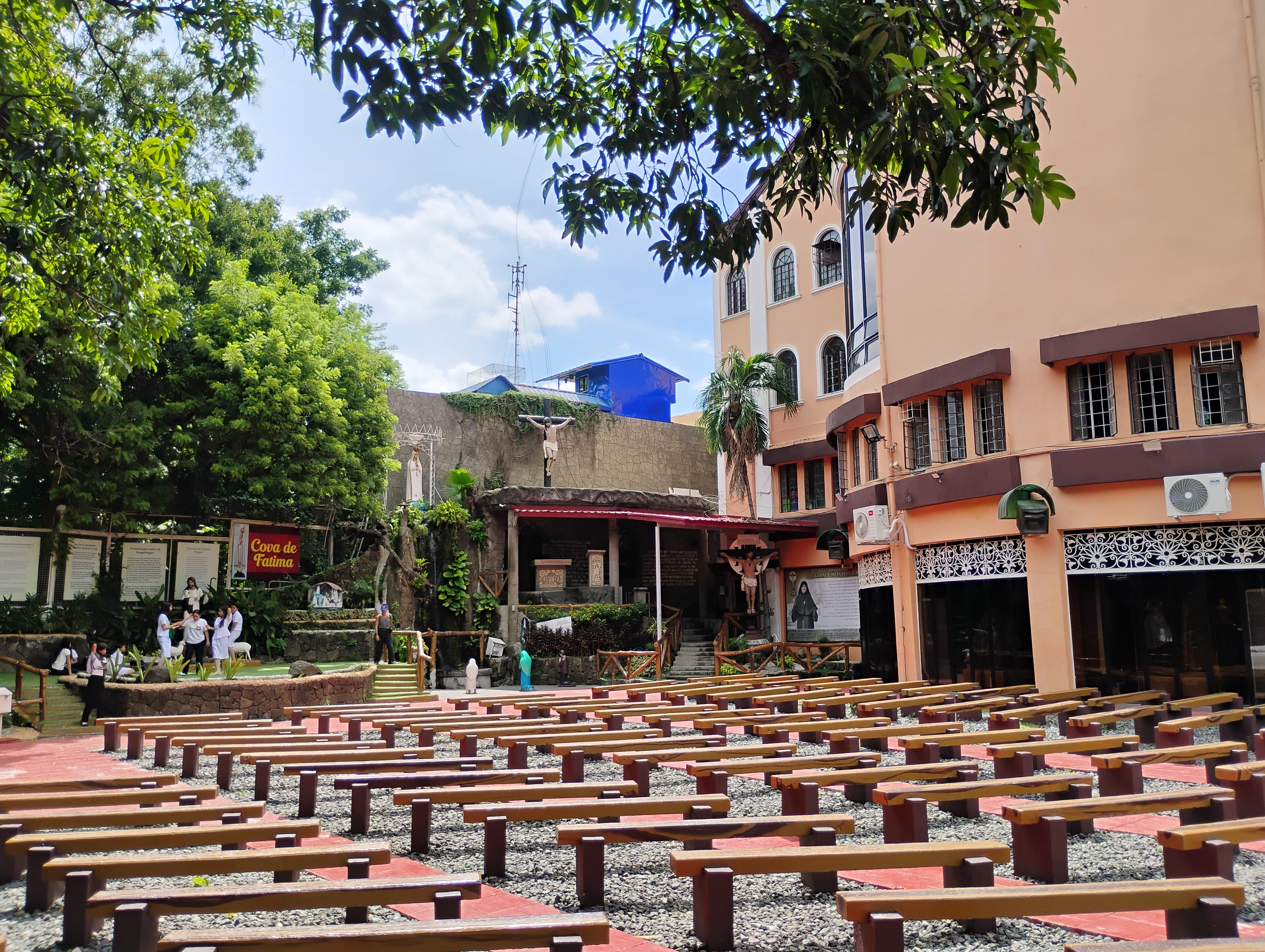
Cova de Fatima

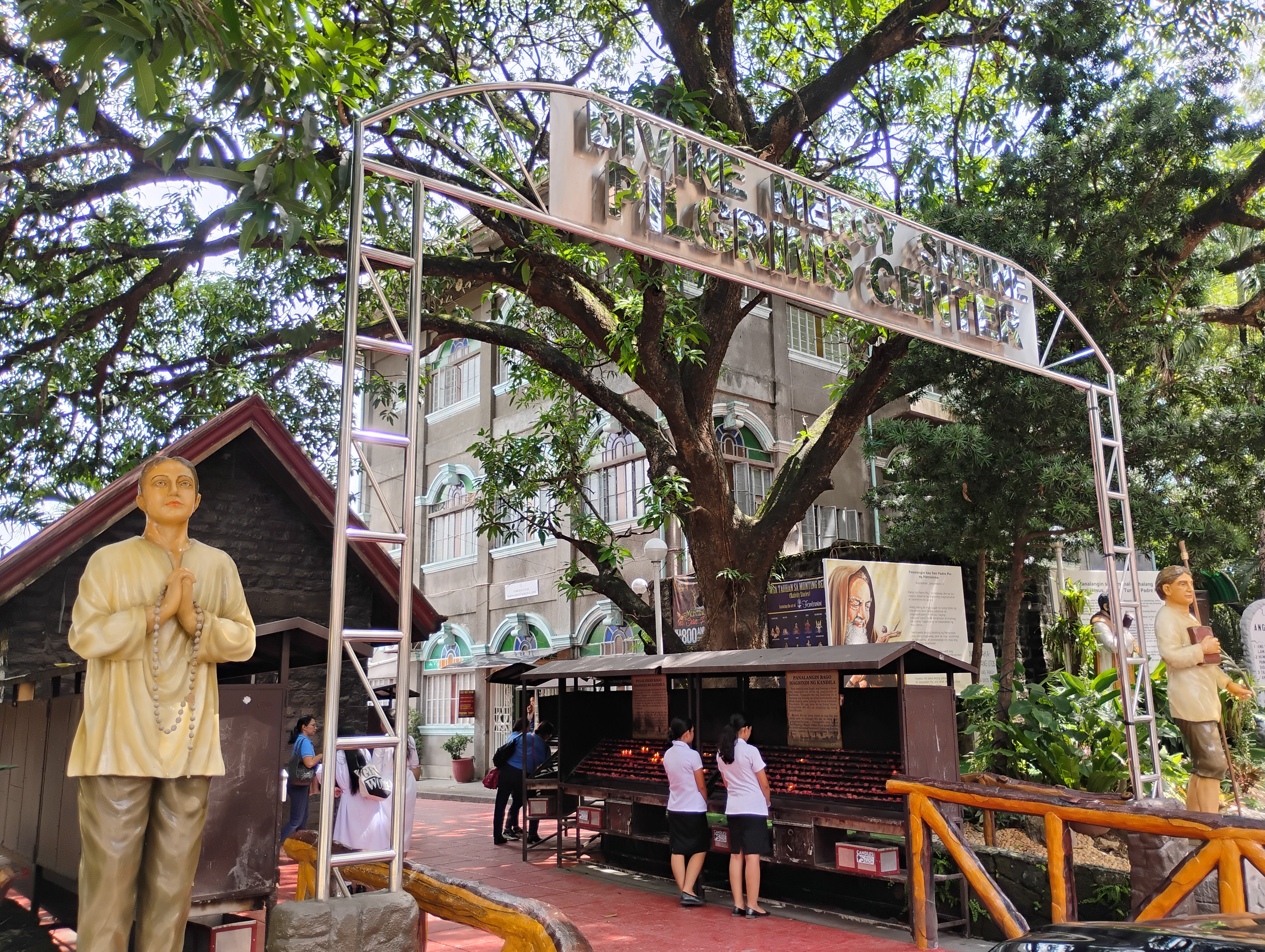
Divine Mercy Shrine Pilgrims Center

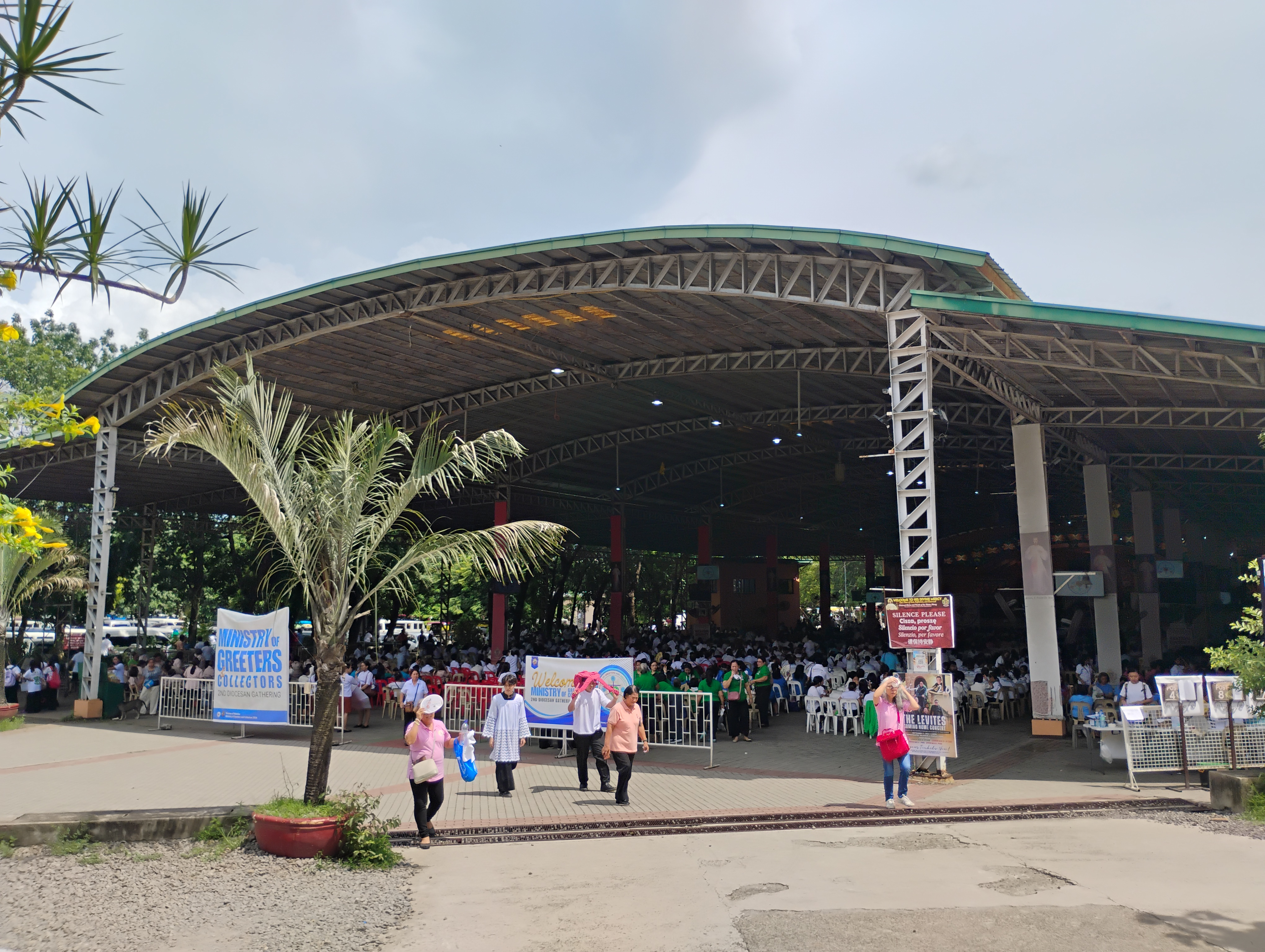
St. Faustina Hall

== See also ==
- Divine Mercy Shrine (Misamis Oriental)
- Church of Saint Mary of the Mongols
