= Bartolome G. Santos =

Filipino Catholic bishop

His Excellency, The Most Reverend Bartolome G. Santos Jr. D.D.
- Bishop of Iba
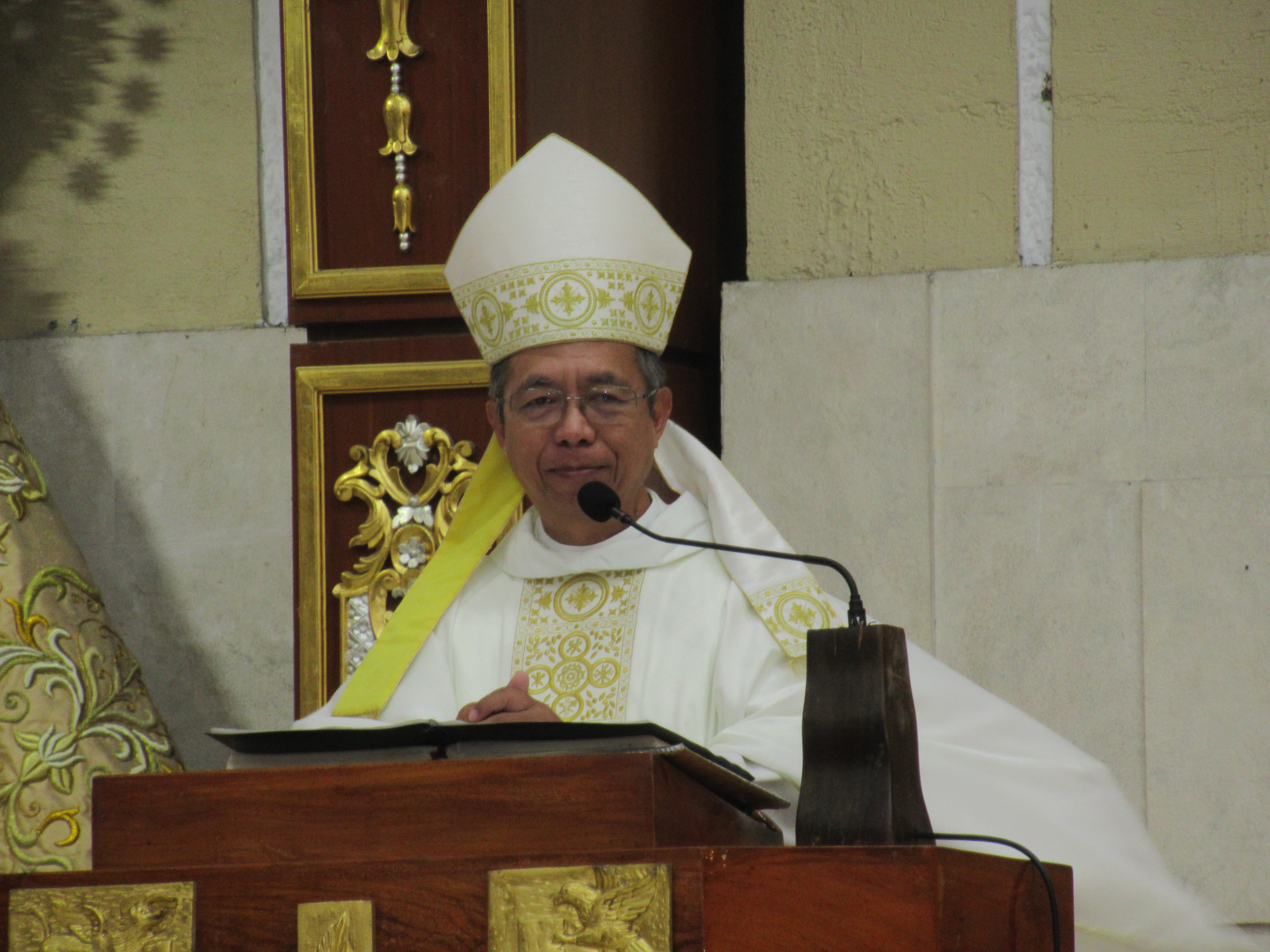
- Santos in 2022
- See: Iba
- Appointed: February 17, 2018
- Installed: May 25, 2018
- Predecessor: Florentino Lavarias

Orders
- Ordination: August 27, 1992 by Cirilo Almario
- Consecration: April 30, 2018 by Luis Antonio Tagle

Personal details
- Born: Bartolome Gaspar Santos Jr. December 1, 1967 (age 58) Santa Maria, Bulacan, Philippines
- Denomination: Catholic Church
- Education: Licentiate in Biblical Theology
- Alma mater: University of Santo Tomas Faculties of Ecclesiastical Studies; Pontifical Gregorian University
- Motto: Dives in misericordia et caritate Dei (Latin for 'Rich in the mercy and love of God')

Ordination history
History
Priestly ordination
- Ordained by: Cirilo Almario
Episcopal consecration
- Principal consecrator: Luis Antonio Tagle
- Co-consecrators: Florentino Lavarias; Jose F. Oliveros
- Styles
- Reference style: His Excellency; The Most Reverend
- Spoken style: Your Excellency
- Religious style: Bishop

Bartolome Gaspar Santos Jr. (born December 1, 1967) is a Filipino Catholic prelate, appointed as the fifth bishop of the Diocese of Iba in Zambales. A Licentiate in Biblical Theology degree holder, he taught various theology subjects at the Immaculate Conception Major Seminary, in Guiguinto, Bulacan, and was rector of the Immaculate Conception Minor Seminary from 2005-2009.

== Early life ==
Santos was born on December 1, 1967, in Santa Maria, Bulacan. He finished high school at the Immaculate Conception Minor Seminary in Guiguinto, Bulacan, then continued for the priesthood, studying philosophy and theology at the University of Santo Tomas Faculties of Ecclesiastical Studies.

== Priesthood ==
Santos was ordained to the priesthood on August 27, 1992, by the then bishop of Malolos, Most. Rev. Cirilo R. Almario, Jr., D.D. He was assigned at San Pascual de Baylon Parish in Obando, Bulacan from 1992-1994, then San Isidro Labrador Parish in Pulilan, Bulacan (1994-1995), before being appointed as spiritual director of the Immaculate Conception Minor Seminary in Guiginto Bulacan in 1995.

In 1996, Santos left the Philippines to study in Rome, obtaining a Licentiate in Biblical Theology degree from the Pontifical Gregorian University in 1999. Upon returning to the Philippines, he resumed his role as spiritual director of the minor seminary (1999-2005), and was subsequently appointed as rector (2005-2009).

Santos was appointed parish priest and rector of the National Shrine of Our Lady of Fatima in Valenzuela City from 2009, and has served at that role until he was appointed by Pope Francis as bishop on February 17, 2018. In the Diocese of Malolos, he was named Episcopal Vicar for the Religious, serving from 2005-2013, and was appointed Vicar General of the Diocese from 2013 until his election as Bishop of Iba.

== Episcopate ==
Santos was ordained a bishop on April 30, 2018, at the Malolos Cathedral. He was ordained by then archbishop of Manila, Luis Antonio Cardinal Tagle, principal consecrator, with Archbishop Florentino Lavarias of San Fernando, Pampanga, and Bishop Jose Oliveros of Malolos as co-consecrators. For his episcopal ministry, Santos chose his motto, "Dives in misericordia et caritate dei (Rich in mercy and love of God),” taken from the Christian Bible's Letter of Paul to the Ephesians, chapter 2, verse 4.

He was installed at the St. Augustine Cathedral on May 25, 2018. Archbishop Lavarias, Santos' predecessor as bishop of Iba, presided the Mass and installation of the new bishop.

Catholic Church titles
Preceded by Florentino Lavarias	Bishop of Iba; May 25, 2018 – present	Incumbent
