= Dennis Villarojo =

Filipino prelate of the Catholic Church (born 1967)

The Most Reverend Dennis Villarojo D.D.
- Bishop of Malolos
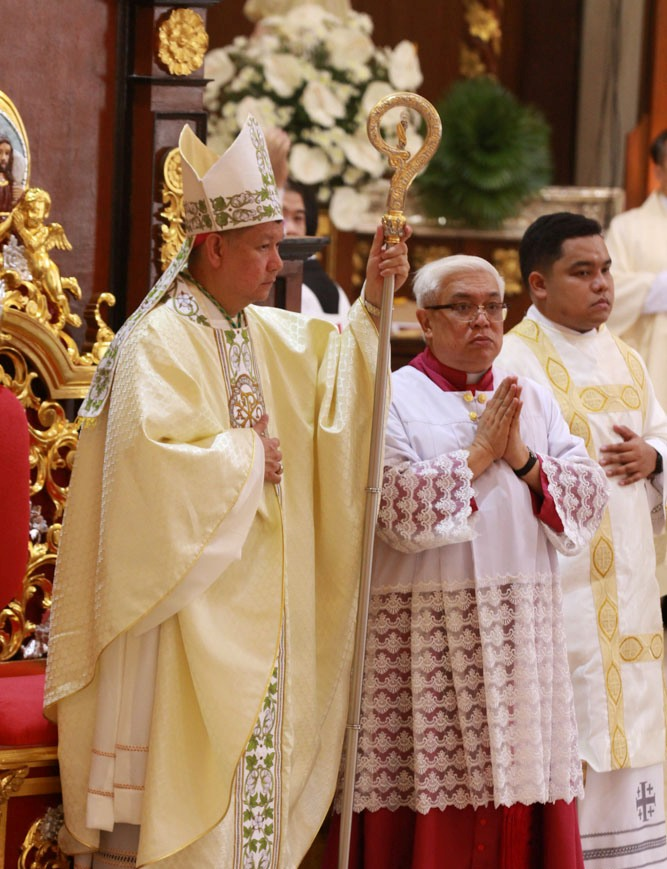
- Villarojo installation as bishop in 2019
- Church: Catholic Church; Latin Church
- Diocese: Malolos
- Appointed: May 14, 2019
- Installed: August 21, 2019
- Predecessor: Jose F. Oliveros
- Successor: Incumbent
- Previous posts: Auxiliary Bishop of Cebu (2015‍–‍2019); Titular Bishop of Gisipa (2015‍–‍2019)

Orders
- Ordination: June 10, 1994 by Ricardo Jamin Vidal
- Consecration: August 10, 2015 by Jose Serofia Palma

Personal details
- Born: Dennis Cabanada Villarojo; April 18, 1967 (age 59) Cebu City, Philippines
- Education: San Carlos Seminary; University of Santo Tomas Central Seminary; Pontifical University of the Holy Cross
- Motto: Consolamini Populi Meus (Latin for 'Be consoled my people' – Isaiah 40:1)
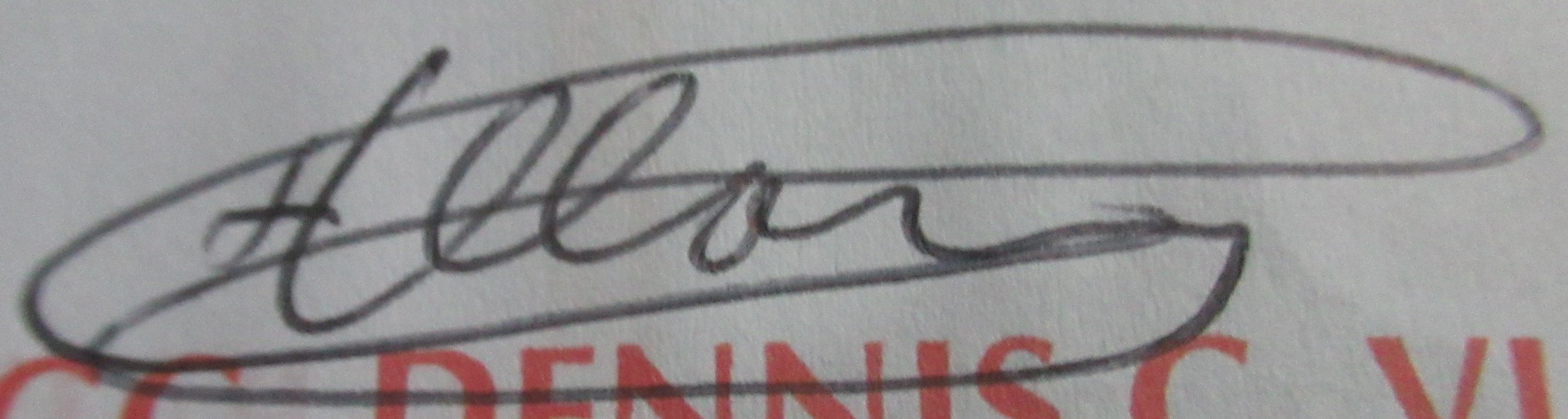
- Signature: Dennis Villarojo's signature

Ordination history
History
Diaconal ordination
- Ordained by: Jaime Lachica Sin
Priestly ordination
- Ordained by: Ricardo Jamin Vidal
Episcopal consecration
- Principal consecrator: Jose Serofia Palma
- Co-consecrators: Ricardo Jamin Vidal, Giuseppe Pinto

Styles of Dennis C. Villarojo
- Reference style: The Most Reverend
- Spoken style: Your Excellency
- Religious style: Bishop

Dennis Cabanada Villarojo (born April 18, 1967) is a Filipino Catholic prelate currently serving as the fifth bishop of the Roman Catholic Diocese of Malolos in the Philippines. Prior to his current role, Villarojo served as an auxiliary bishop of Cebu from 2015 until he took office as Bishop of Malolos on his installation on August 21, 2019. He was the secretary-general for the 51st International Eucharistic Congress which took place in Cebu in 2016.

He holds a licentiate in philosophy from the University of Santo Tomas and a doctorate in philosophy from the Pontifical University of the Sacred Heart in Rome.

Villarojo is also the current Regional Representative of the Catholic Bishops Conference of the Philippines for southwest Luzon, and is a member of the CBCP Office on the Protection of Minors.

== Early life and studies ==
He completed his high school formation at the Colegio de San Jose- Recoletos in Cebu City. He entered San Carlos Seminary College of the Archdiocese of Cebu where he finished his philosophical studies. Later, he continued his priestly training at the Pontifical and Royal University of Santo Tomas in Manila, where he took his theological studies, and obtained his licentiate degree in Ecclesiastical Philosophy.

He was ordained deacon by Cardinal Jaime Sin in Manila in 1993. A year later, on June 10, 1994, he was ordained priest for the Archdiocese of Cebu at the Our Lady of Guadalupe Shrine in Cebu City. For four years, from 1994 to 1998, he was personal secretary of Cardinal Ricardo Vidal, the ordinary of the archdiocese at that time.

From 1998 to 2001, Villarojo continued his post-graduate studies in philosophy in Rome, at the Pontifical University of the Holy Cross, where he earned his doctorate.

After studying in Rome he returned to his country and continued, until 2010, to take the task as secretary of Vidal and at the same time as coordinator of the pastoral planning board of the archdiocese.

Since 2010, Villarojo has been the chairman of the pastoral team at the parish of the Our Lady of the Sacred Heart in Barangay Capitol Site, Cebu City. In 2012, he was also appointed secretary-general of the 51st International Eucharistic Congress, which was held in Cebu, in January 2016.

== Episcopacy ==
On July 3, 2015, Pope Francis designated Villarojo as one of the auxiliary bishops of Cebu. He was consecrated bishop on August 10, 2015 at the Cebu Metropolitan Cathedral by Archbishop José S. Palma, the current ordinary of the archdiocese. Cardinal Ricardo Vidal (Cardinal Archbishop Emeritus of Cebu) and Giuseppe Pinto (Papal Nuncio to the Philippines) were the co-consecrators.

On May 14, 2019, Pope Francis designated Bishop Villarojo as the new bishop of the Diocese of Malolos.

=== Canonical Installation ===
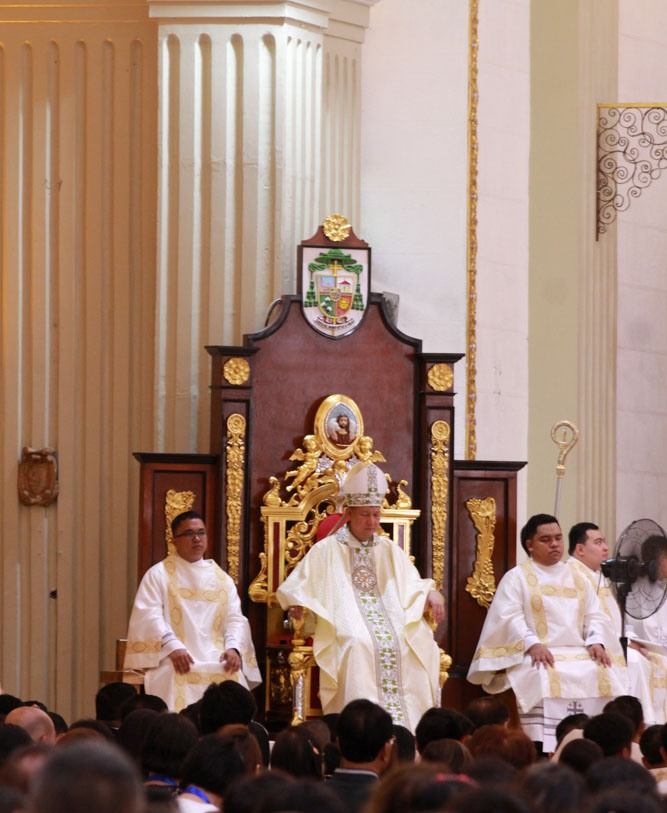
Villarojo accompanied by two Reverends on both sides of the Cathedra.

The Canonical Installation of Villarojo took place on the 21 August 2019 at the Minor Basilica of the Immaculate Conception in the Diocese of Malolos. The installation was presided over by Cardinal Luis Antonio Tagle of Manila and Archbishop Gabriele Giordano Caccia who was the Apostolic Nuncio to the Philippines.

The Eucharistic Celebration took place at the Malolos Cathedral with the attendance of the entire Malolos Clergy and members of the Catholic Bishops' Conference of the Philippines (CBCP). These included then CBCP President, Archbishop of Davao Romulo Valles and former Malolos Bishop Rolando Tria Tirona.

==== Eucharistic Celebration ====
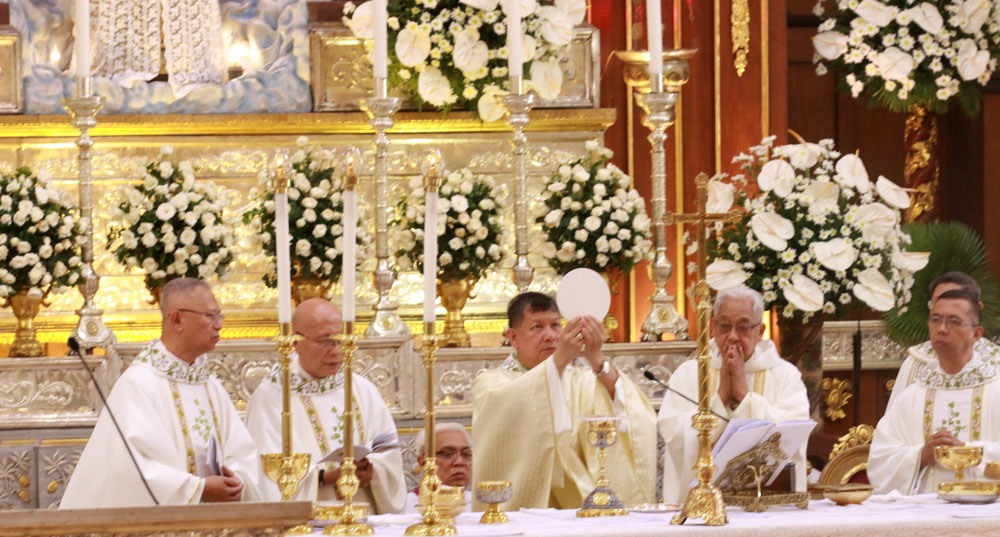
The Blessing of the Bread and Wine. (From Left to Right: Cebu Archbishop José S. Palma, Cubao Bishop and outgoing Malolos Apostolic Administrator Honesto Ongtioco, Bishop Dennis Villarojo, Caceres Archbishop Rolando Tria Tirona, and Iba Bishop Bartolome G. Santos.)

On 21 August 2019, Villarojo arrived at the Diocese of Malolos to be installed as the Diocese's next prelate. He was accompanied by several clergymen of the Archdiocese of Cebu followed by Archbishop José S. Palma. Villarojo first paid a visit to the historical Barasoain Church where he was greeted by members of the Church's clergy including parish priest Dario V. Cabral. Moreover, Governor Wilhelmino Sy-Alvarado was among the politicians of the provincial government of Bulacan to greet the incoming prelate. This was followed by a short blessing to the Our Lady of Mt. Carmel, the patroness of the Barasoain Church before the parade of Villarojo to the Malolos Cathedral.

Villarojo was accompanied by members of the Diocese of Malolos' clergy en route to the cathedral and was met by a line of students from the Immaculate Conception School for Boys stretching from the gates of the Barasoain Church to the main gate of the Malolos Cathedral. The parade continued despite the heavy rain. The ceremonial handover of the keys to the province was conducted and overseen by Vice Governor Daniel Fernando.

The opening of the Cathedral doors and the kissing of the cross–symbolizing the arrival of the new prelate of the diocese was overseen by the cathedral's Parish Priest Rev. Fr. Domingo M. Salonga and apostolic administrator Bishop Honesto Ongtioco. This was immediately followed by Villarojo's first blessing inside of the cathedral. Following the blessing, the march towards the cathedral's altar was conducted accompanied by Rev. Msgr. Pablo S. Legaspi Jr. Villarojo paid a solemn prayer in front of the Our Lady of the Immaculate Conception, the patroness of the Diocese of Malolos and a subsequent prayer and visit to his predecessors that have passed away: Del Rosario, Almario and Oliveros whom were all buried underneath of the retablo at the crypt.

Following Villarojo's visit to the crypt, he returned to the altar and knelt before the Apostolic Nuncio of the Philippines, Gabriele Caccia and read the Rite of Canonical Installation beside then parish-priest chancellor Rev. Fr. Dennis Santos. This was immediately followed by the signing of the rite from both Caccia and Villarojo as the preparation for the Eucharistic Celebration commenced.

The entrance march began with the singing of "Laudate, Laudate Dominum", a composition by Christopher Walker. The reading of the apostolic letter signed by Pope Francis was conducted by Caccia and followed by the Filipino translation done by Rev. Fr. Santos. A silver crosier was then handed to Villarojo by Cardinal Luis Antonio Tagle and he was seated by Tagle and Caccia to the Cathedra. This was followed by the giving of homage by members of the Diocese of Malolos' collective groups including the indigenous peoples of Bulacan, members of the government, business and private sectors, and of the clergy.

The blessing of the bread and blood of Christ was presided over by outgoing Apostolic Administrator Honesto Ongtioco, Archbishop Tirona as the former prelate of the Diocese and Bishop Bartolome Santos as one of the clergymen from Malolos to be appointed Bishop.

The mass concluded with a Latin final blessing by Villarojo and the singing of "Psalm 100" commonly known as "Salmo 100" or "Umawit Kang Masaya" composed by Lucio San Pedro.

== Coat of arms ==
Bishop Villarojo's personal Coat of Arms is blazoned as follows:

=== As Auxiliary Bishop of Cebu ===
Arms: Per fesse, in dexter base Gules a mullet of six points, and in sinister base a Sun in splendour, all Or; in chief Argent and issuant from the base the Shrine of Magellan's Cross Proper.

The shield is surmounted by a Bishop's cross and by a Roman galero of this rank, i.e., Vert with six tassels of the same pendant (1,2,3) at both sides.

The symbolism of the heraldic achievement is as follows:

The Magellan's Cross Kiosk in the upper white field (chief Argent) symbolizes his being a Cebuano bishop. It is also the 51st International Eucharistic Congress Pilgrim Symbol. Bishop Villarojo is also the Secretary-General of the 51st International Eucharistic Congress.

The red base of the coat of arms represents the martyrdom of Denis, patron saint of Paris, France, of Pedro Calungsod (a Cebuano martyr and the 2nd Filipino declared as saint), and of Lawrence of Rome (another martyr), whose feast is commemorated by the Catholic Church on August 10 – the day of Bishop Villarojo's Episcopal Ordination. The color red has also another significance. The Official Newspaper of the Archdiocese of Cebu referred to the color's connection with the family name of the Bishop, which is translated in Cebuano as: "Adunay kalambigitan sa akong bangsagon nga Villarojo, kinatsila sa "dakong balay o gamayng lungsod nga pula" (A big house or a small city of red).

The six-pointed star (mullet of six points) on the dexter side (right side with reference to the bearer) represents the Blessed Virgin Mary. This star is also a seen on the Image of Our Lady of Mount Carmel. Bishop Villarojo is a member of the Third Order of the Order of the Discalced Carmelites.

On the sinister side (left side with reference to the bearer) of the base is a Sun in splendour, which represents the Pontifical and Royal University of Santo Tomas where he studied Theology. The sun is also symbolic of the Light of the Truth – Christ.

=== As Bishop of Malolos ===
The shield is surmounted by a Bishop's cross and by a Roman galero of this rank, i.e., Vert with six tassels of the same pendant (1,2,3) at both sides.

The dexter and sinister sides both refer to the bearer.

Dexter Chief Canton – The church facade seen on blue background is Nuestra Señora del Carmen Parish, otherwise known as Barasoain Church, the historic venue of the 1899 Malolos Congress and birthplace of the First Philippine Republic and the Malolos Constitution.

Sinister Point – The Magellan's Cross Kiosk in the upper white field symbolizes Cebu City and the Archdiocese of Cebu, where he hails from and was ordained as a priest.

It is also pilgrim symbol of the 51st International Eucharistic, an event where Bishop Villarojo served as secretary-general. It commemorates the City of Malolos as the first capital of the country, making it one of the province's most historical landmarks.

Dexter Base – The three cotton "bulak" flowers on the green field symbolize the Province of Bulacan. The cotton's Tagalog name is the term from which the province's name was derived. It also symbolizes the abundance of life and welfare in the province.

Sinister Base – The red base of represents the Martyrdom of Saint Denis, patron of Paris, France; of Saint Pedro Calungsod, a Cebuano martyr and the second Filipino saint; and Saint Lawrence of Rome, whose feast is commemorated every August, the day of Bishop Villarojo's episcopal ordination.

Moreover, the Official Newspaper of the Archdiocese of Cebu referred to red's connection with the bishop's family name, which is translated in Cebuano as adunay kalambigitan sa akong bangsagon nga Villarojo, sa dakong balay o gamayng lungsod nga pula (A big house or small city of red).

At the center of this section is a Sun in splendor, representing the Pontifical and Royal University of Santo Tomas, where he studied theology. The sun is also symbolic of Christ as Light of the Truth.

Center Point – The interwoven "A" and "M" Marian monogram is the Auspice Maria which is Latin for Under the protection of Mary. It also evokes the first two words of the ancient prayer Ave Maria or Haily Mary.

The crown with 12 stars refer to the Woman of Revelation (12:1–2). These symbols represent La Virgen Inmaculada Concepcion de Malolos, titular patroness of the Diocese of Malolos, whose image was canonically crowned in 2012 on the occasion of the Golden Jubilee of the diocese.

The cross that divides the blazon is taken from the seal of the diocese, which symbolizes the unwavering love of Christ for humanity.

The brown color of the cross symbolizes Bishop Villarojo's devotion to Mary as a member of the Third Order of Discalced Carmelites.

Villarojo's motto is taken from the Book of the Prophet Isaiah 40:1, Consolamini Popule Meus (“Be consoled my people”).

Catholic Church titles
Preceded by Jose F. Oliveros	Bishop of Malolos; August 21, 2019 – Present	Incumbent
