= YBA =

YBA or yba can refer to a number of things:

- Young British Artists, a movement of British artists in the 1980s and 1990s
- Yala language, a language spoken in Ogoja, Nigeria, by ISO 639 code
- Young Buddhist Association, an association of Buddhists in the U.S.
- Banff Airport, an airstrip near Banff, Alberta, Canada, by IATA code
- Yemen Basketball Association, which manages the Yemen men's national basketball team
- Young Business Ambassadors, a business networking program run by the Singapore International Foundation Iba Cathedral (also spelled "Yba"), a cathedral in Iba, the Philippines.
- Your Bizarre Adventure, a JoJo's Bizarre Adventure fan game on Roblox
