= Immaculate Conception School for Boys =

Roman Catholic high school in Bulacan, Philippines

Location
- Poblacion, City of Malolos; Bulacan; Philippines; 14°50′33″N 120°48′43″E

Information
- Type: Private, Catholic
- Motto: Sanctitas in Sapientia (Latin) (Holiness in Wisdom)
- Established: 1989
- Founder: Most Rev. Cirilo R. Almario Jr., DD.
- President: Rev. Msgr. Pablo S. Legaspi Jr., P.C.
- Chairman: Most Rev. Dennis Cabanada Villarojo, D.D.
- Rector: Rev. Msgr. Pablo S. Legazpi Jr., P.C.
- Principal: Christian Mendoza (2025-present)
- Chaplain: Rev. Fr. Menald S. Leonardo
- Grades: Grade 7(I); Grade 8(II); Grade 9(III); Grade 10(IV)
- Colors: Blue and White
- Nickname: ICONS
- Newspaper: The ICONS
- Yearbook: ICONS
- Affiliations: Immaculate Conception School of Malolos - Metropolis Junior High Division; Immaculate Conception School of Malolos - Senior High School Division
- Hymn: Salve Mater Immaculata
- School Cheer: Icons Cheer

The Immaculate Conception School for Boys (ICSB) is a private Catholic high school exclusively for boys located in Malolos, Philippines. It was established by the Most Rev. Cirilo R. Almario, Jr., Bishop of Malolos in 1989. It is situated next to the Minor Basilica of Our Lady of Immaculate Conception, the seat of the Roman Catholic Diocese of Malolos.

== History ==
=== 1989-2013: establishment ===
The Immaculate Conception School for Boys was established and founded by the Bishop-emeritus of Malolos, Late Bishop-emeritus Cirilo Almario Jr. in 1989, with the late Mr. Rodolfo C. Bagay as its school principal. In 1934, the Holy Spirit Academy of Malolos once owned the land proper and named it Immaculada Academy that supports an exclusively for Girls school up until 1989 when Bishop Cirilo established an exclusive private boy school. The School sees around 300-400 new enrollees each school year and is a known school in Malolos that offers K-12 basic education.

=== 2013-present: ICSM elementary building fire, reconstruction, present history ===
In 2013, the neighboring building of the Immaculate Conception School of Malolos whom then situated the Elementary Department until 2015 when Late Bishop Jose Oliveros D.D. established the Senior High School Department, caught on fire in the middle of the night. People crowded outside the building to watch the damage in the fire. In the same year, the fire was declared to be an exposed wiring situation. It wasn't until 2017 when the elementary building got finished, 4 years after the fire occurred. The size of the building was reduced as the present building of the ICSB branch is smaller than the original that burnt. Two segments of the building were demolished due to permanent destruction. Both buildings of ICSB and ICSM were replaced with stone.

== Leadership ==
The Immaculate Conception School for Boys is always headed by the Bishop of Malolos. The satellite branches of the school also operate under the presidency of the Bishop.

Presidents of the Immaculate Conception School for Boys
Bishop	Term
Most Rev. Cirilo Almario Jr., DD. (Founder)	1989-1993
Most Rev. Rolando J. Tria Tirona, OCD., DD.	1993-2001
Most Rev. Jose Francisco Oliveros, DD.	2001 - 2018
Most Rev. Honesto Ongtioco, DD. (acting; as Apostolic Administrator - Sede Vacante)	2018 - 2019
Most Rev. Dennis C. Villarojo, DD., Ph.D. (incumbent ordinary)	2019–present

The Rector is Rev. Msgr. Pablo S. Legaspi, Jr., Vicar General of the Diocese of Malolos.
