= Masinloc Church =

Roman Catholic church in Zambales, Philippines

- Diocesan Shrine and Parish of San Andres
- Pandiyosesis na Dambana at Parokya ni San Andres (Filipino)
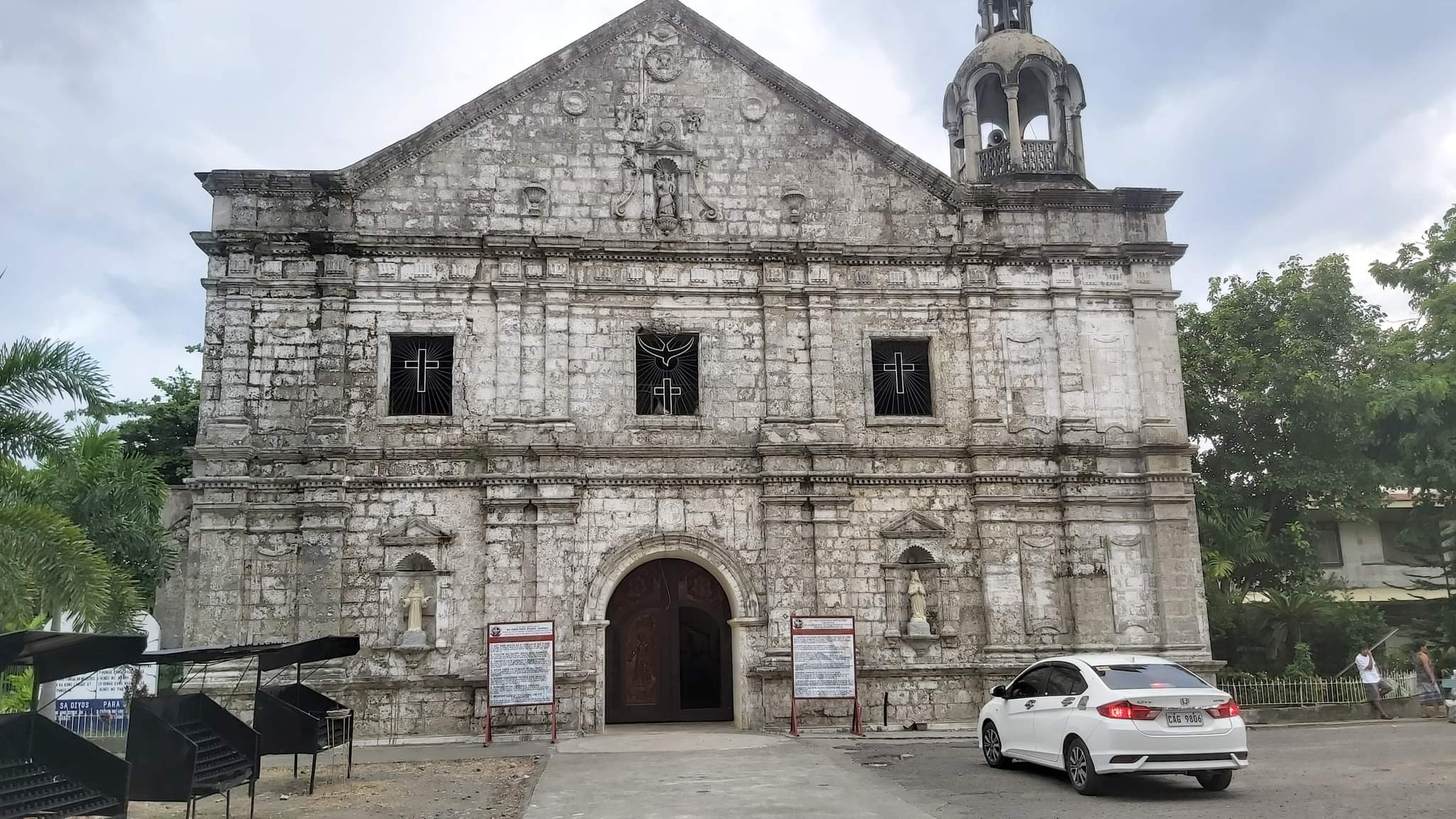
- Church facade

- Location in Luzon Location in the Philippines
- 15°32′16″N 119°56′56″E
- Location: Zambales
- Country: Philippines
- Denomination: Roman Catholic

History
- Former name: San Andres Parish Church
- Status: Diocesan shrine and parish
- Founded: 1607
- Founder: Father Andrés del Espíritu Santo (Augustinian Recollects)
- Dedication: Saint Andrew the Apostle
- Dedicated: 1607, 2007

Architecture
- Functional status: Active
- Heritage designation: National Cultural treasure
- Designated: 2001
- Architectural type: Church building
- Style: Earthquake Baroque

Specifications
- Length: 54 m (177 ft)
- Width: 18 m (59 ft)
- Materials: Coral stone, cement, steel

Administration
- Archdiocese: San Fernando
- Diocese: Iba

Clergy
- Archbishop: Florentino G. Lavarias, D.D.
- Bishop(s): Bartolome G. Santos Jr., D.D.
- Rector: Lazaro B Villafuerte

The Diocesan Shrine and Parish of San Andres, commonly known as Masinloc Church, is an 18th-century Baroque style Roman Catholic church located at Brgy. South Poblacion, Masinloc, Zambales, Philippines. The parish church, dedicated to Saint Andrew the Apostle, is under the jurisdiction of the Diocese of Iba. The church is unusual among Spanish-era churches in the Central Luzon region for having been built with coral instead of adobe, and was declared a National Cultural Treasure by the National Museum of the Philippines along with 25 other Spanish-era churches in 2001.

== Parish history ==
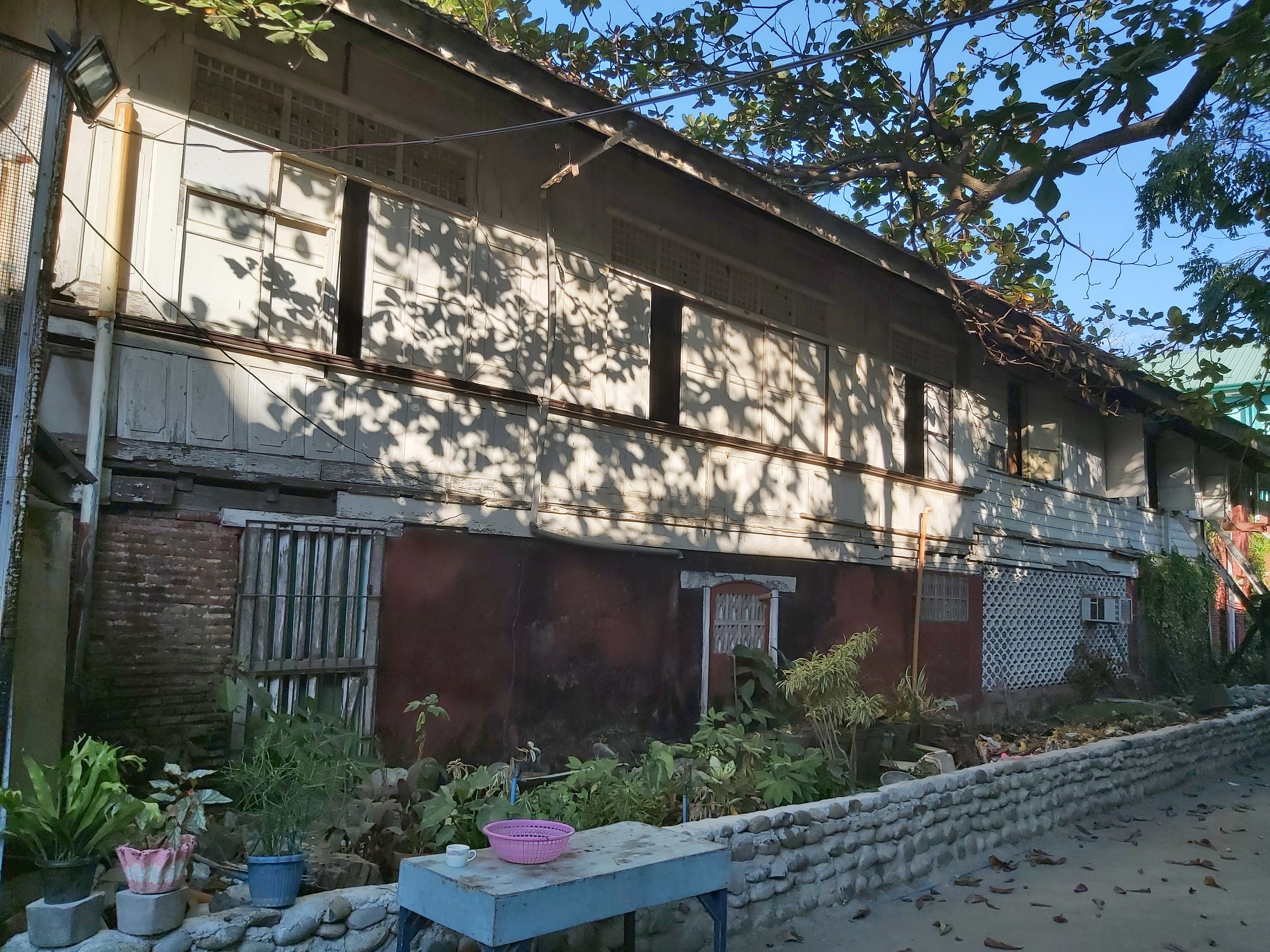
The Old Convent of the Church, later transformed by the Columban Missionaries into a Catholic School

The parish of Masinloc had its beginnings as a mission founded by the Augustinian Recollects in 1607, making it the first Christian church in the province. It was founded by Father Andrés del Espíritu Santo with the guidance of Father Rodrigo de San Miguel, then vicar of the mission in Mariveles, Bataan, who urged the head of the religious group to set up a mission in the present-day site location of the town which was then abundant with plants locally referred to as hinloc. The original commune established by the Spanish friars is now barrios Bani and Tugui. For the majority of its early history, the church became the center of evangelization throughout northern Zambales, even being named by a Recollect chronicler as "La Mejor Iglesia y El Mejor Convento" (The best church and the best convent) in Zambales. Throughout the Spanish colonial rule of the Philippines, the parish of Masinloc was administered by the Augustinian Recollects (1607–1679; 1713–1902) and the Dominicans (1679–1713). The parish was also administered by the Columban Fathers (1951–2000).

In 2021, the church was declared as one of the "Jubilee Churches" of Zambales in celebration of the 500 Years of Christianity in the Philippines. In the same year, the parish was declared as a diocesan shrine, making it the first diocesan shrine to be declared in honor of Saint Andrew the Apostle in the Philippines, and the third diocesan shrine in the Diocese of Iba. The elevation of the parish took place on November 30, 2021, in a Mass presided by Bishop Bartolome G. Santos Jr., during the 414th religious fiesta of the parish and town.

== Architecture ==
=== Architectural history ===
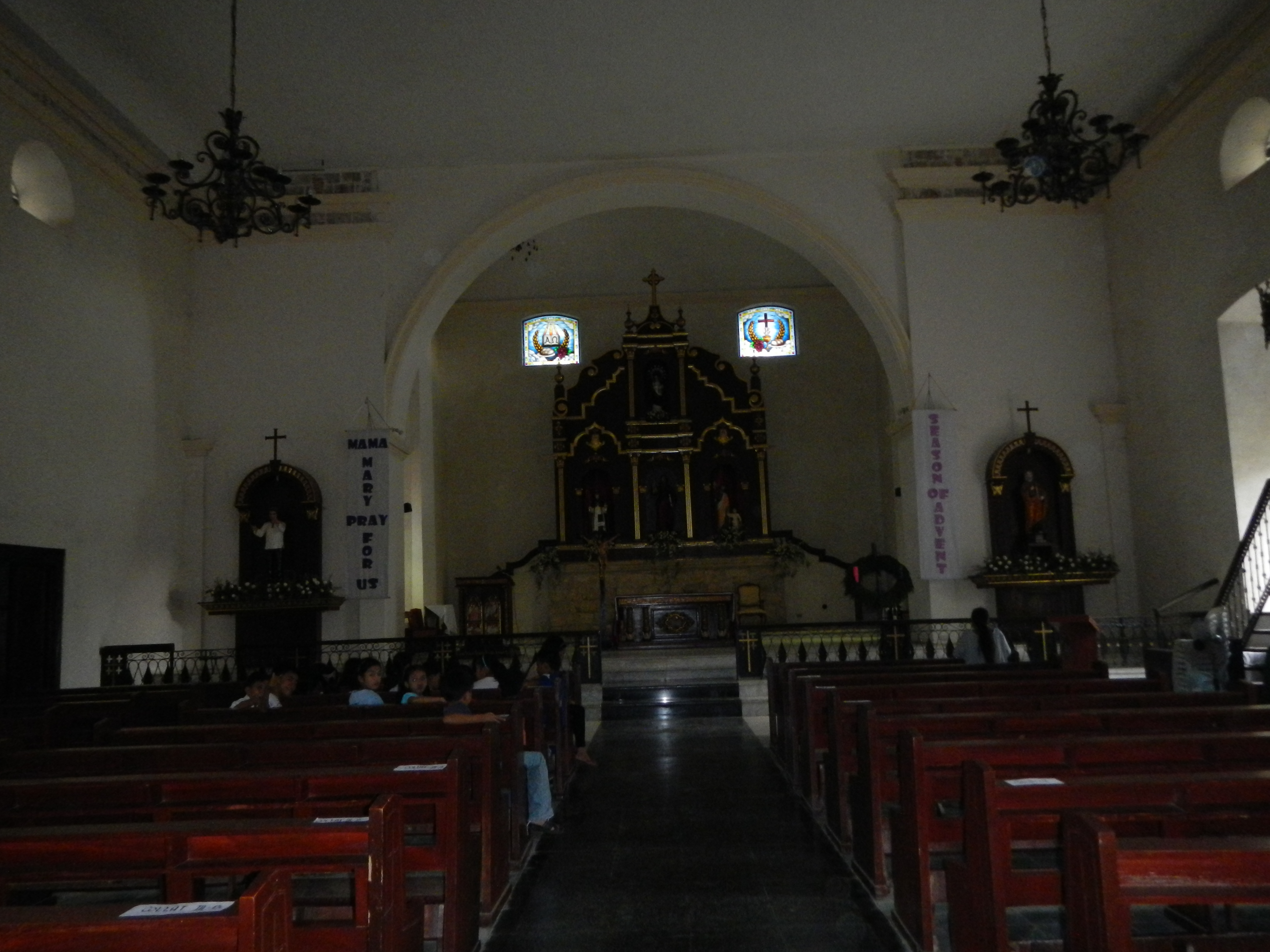
Church interior in 2013

The exact date of construction of the present coral stone church cannot be accurately traced, although some records tell that a certain Father Francisco de San Guillermo requested the construction of a church and convent in 1616 using materials that were also used in the construction of a fortification. Some sources suggest the date of the construction of the present structure to be as early as 1713, when the Augustinian Recollects returned to Zambales, from their mission in Mindoro. Another, more reliable, source suggests that the construction likely began around 1745. By the mid-18th century, major earthquakes brought damage to the church structure, leaving it unused for a few decades. In 1825, during the administration of Father Gregorio Miguel Jiménez, the church and convent were rehabilitated. By 1836, repair works done by Father Jiménez were continued by Father José de Aranguren; (later on, Father Aranguren would be installed as the Archbishop of Manila in 1846). From 1875 to 1877, major repairs on the church roof were executed. Father Juan Ortíz commissioned architect Felipe Vera to replace the tile roof with nipa. Later on, Father Agustín Pérez had the thatched roof replaced with galvanized iron sheets. Father Pérez also built the bell tower in 1882 to 1883. A strong earthquake damaged the church during the administration of the Columban missionaries in 1970. A year after, Father Donald Dudea made major repairs to the damaged structure including the addition of the new belfry and several repairs on the façade. A magnitude 6.8 earthquake on December 12, 1999, damaged the church, particularly cracking a part of the façade. Restoration efforts were established soon after in time for the 400th jubilee of the parish.

=== Architectural description ===
The façade of the church is predominantly an Earthquake Baroque style with Neo-classic features. The front is divided into the triangular pediment, two horizontal sections and three vertical ones with an extended left portion forming the bell tower. It features saints’ niches on the first level, rectangular windows on the second, and an elaborately carved niche of the town's patron saint and carving of geometric shapes and medallions on the pediment. Triglyphs decorate the architrave between the second level and the pediment, giving the church a classical appearance. The belfry is designed like a circular template surmounted with a lantern and a cross.

== National Cultural Treasure ==
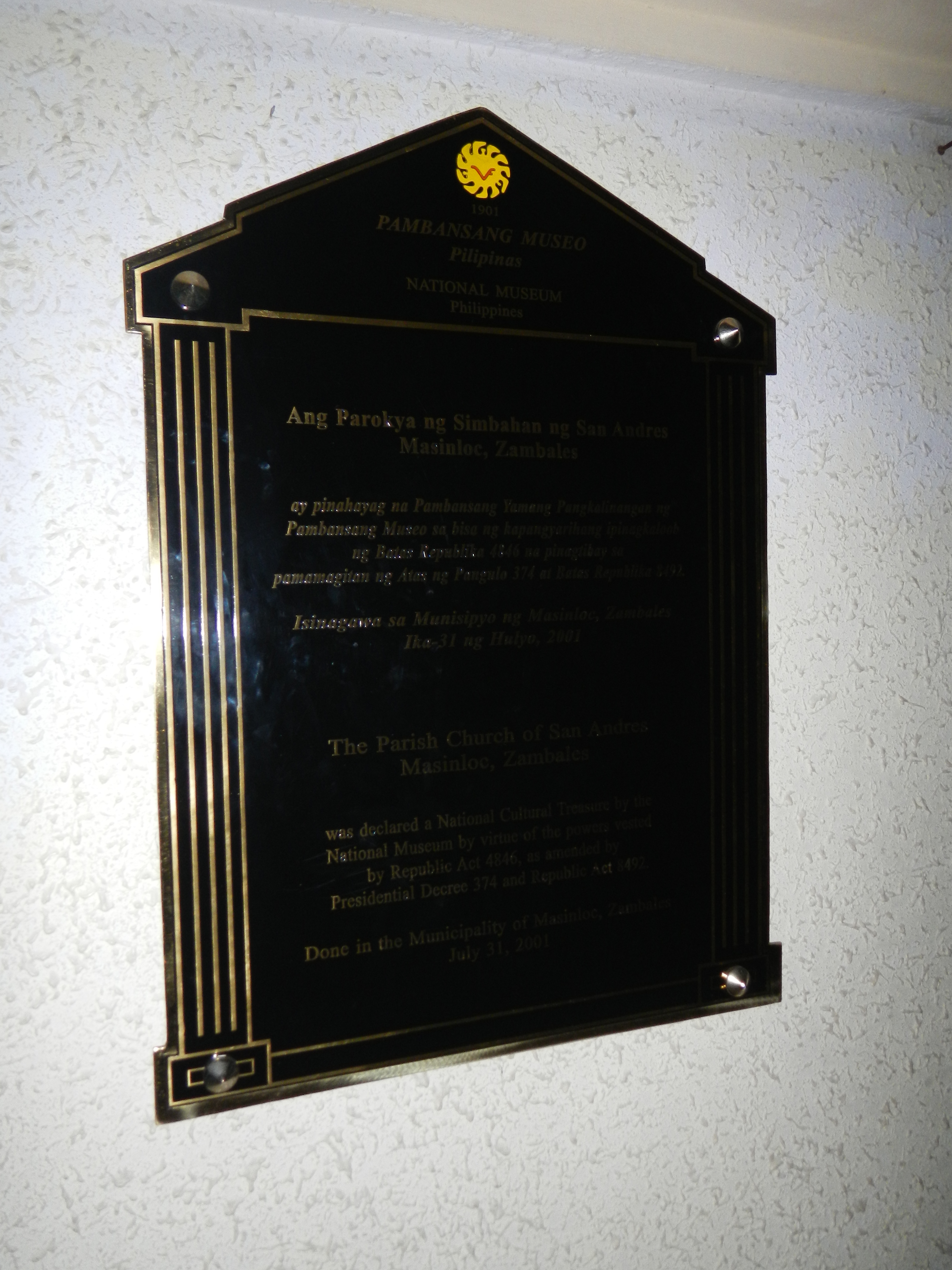
National Cultural Treasure marker

The church was officially declared by the National Museum of the Philippines as a National Cultural Treasure on July 31, 2001.

== War dance ==
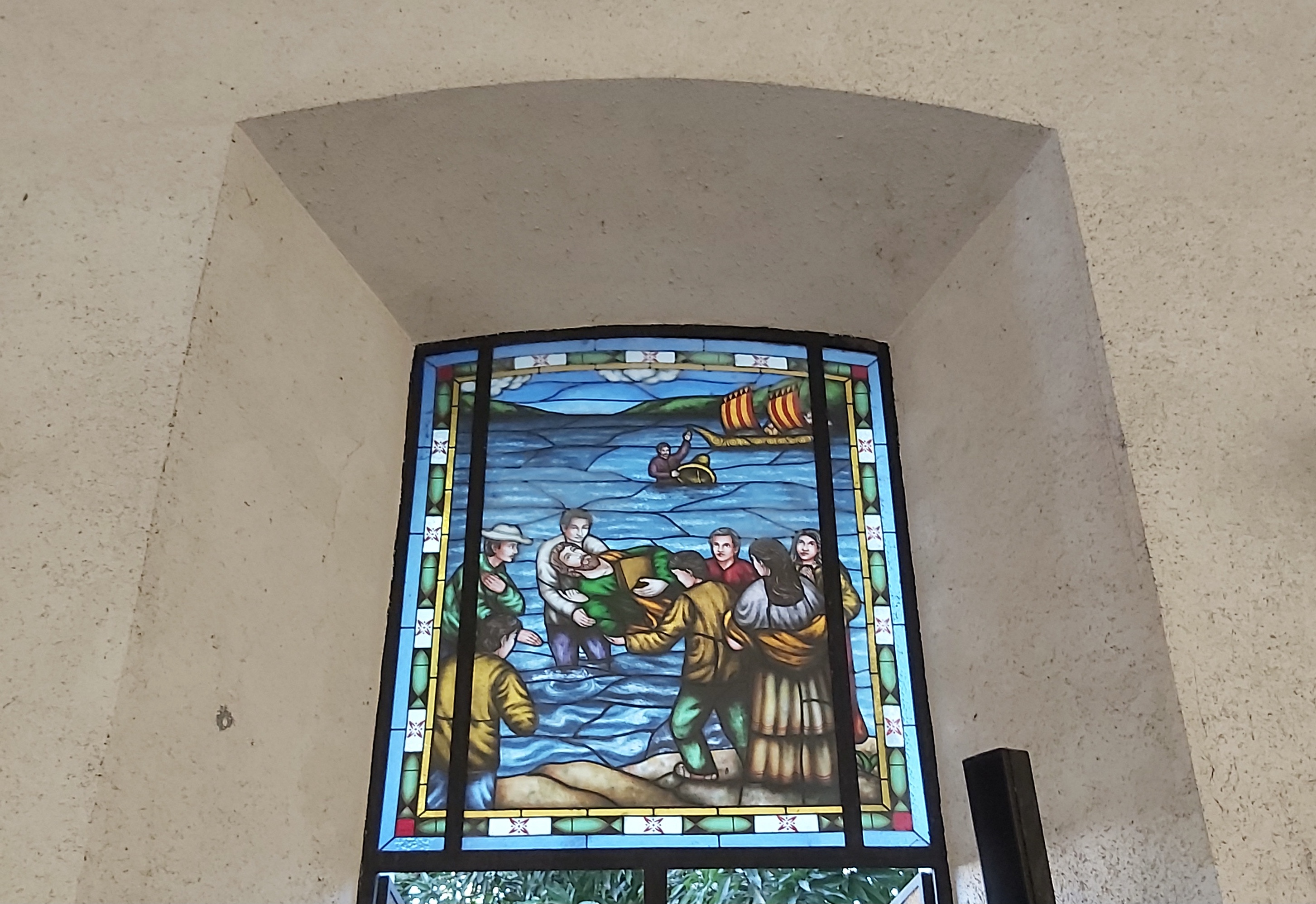
A stained glass window narrating the origins of the binabayani tradition

A 400-year traditional war dance, known as the binabayani (a Sambal word which means "bravery"), re-enacts the war between the native Aetas and Christians,. According to folklore, an image on top of a bell floating along the shore stopped when it reached Masinloc, and was too heavy to lift from the water. An elder suggested performing a war dance between the Aetas and Christians, and the image became light enough to be brought to shore. The earliest recorded telling of this story was by Capt. Florentino Elicaño in 1621.
