= Diocese of Iba =

Latin Catholic diocese in the Philippines

Coordinates: 15.3262°N 119.9798°E

Diocese of Iba Dioecesis Ibanae Diyosesis ng Iba Diocesis ti Iba

Catholic
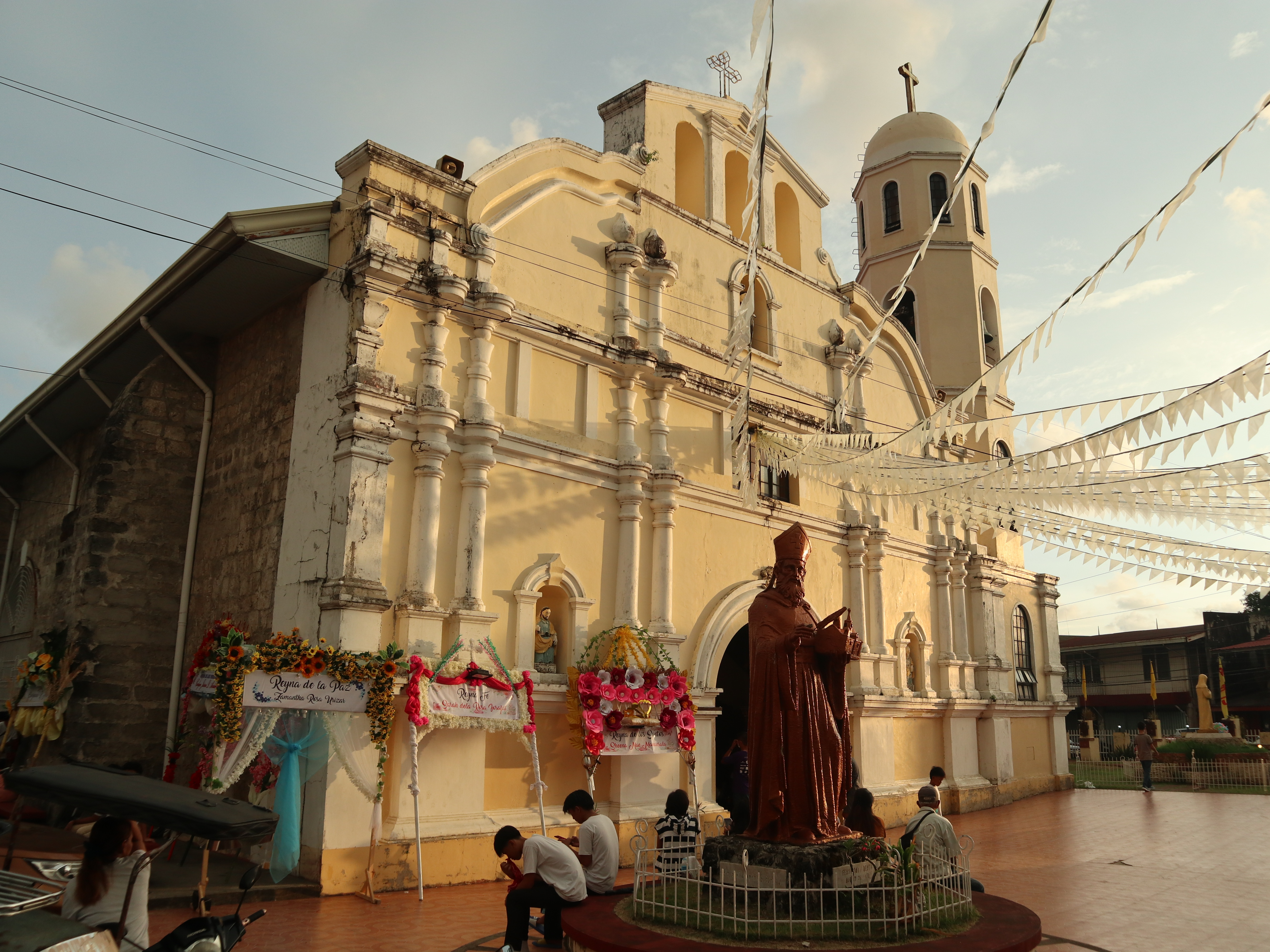
- Iba Cathedral

- Coat of arms

Location
- Country: Philippines
- Territory: Zambales and Olongapo City
- Ecclesiastical province: San Fernando

Statistics
- Area: 3,642 km^{2} (1,406 sq mi)
- Population: Total; Catholics: (as of 2021); 907,231; 725,785 (80%)
- Parishes: 23

Information
- Denomination: Catholic Church
- Sui iuris church: Latin Church
- Rite: Roman Rite
- Established: November 15, 1982; 43 years ago
- Cathedral: St. Augustine of Hippo Cathedral-Parish
- Patron saint: Augustine of Hippo
- Secular priests: 41

Current leadership
- Pope: Leo XIV
- Bishop: Bartolome G. Santos, Jr.
- Metropolitan Archbishop: Florentino Lavarias
- Vicar General: Rev. Fr. Hanival Brucelas

The Diocese of Iba (Lat: Dioecesis Ibanae) is a Latin Church ecclesiastical jurisdiction or diocese of the Catholic Church in the Philippines that comprises the province of Zambales and the City of Olongapo.

== History ==
On June 12, 1955, a territorial prelature was erected from territory in the dioceses of San Fernando, Pampanga, and of Diocese of Lingayen-Dagupan and was elevated as the Diocese of Iba on November 15, 1982. The diocese is part of the Ecclesiastical Province of San Fernando, Pampanga.

== Coat of arms ==
The transfixed flaming heart is the symbol of Augustine of Hippo, Doctor of the Church, who is the titular of the cathedral. The bezants represent the great wealth found in the Zambales mountains which cover the territory of the diocese.

The original coat of arms as designed by Bishop Mariano Madriaga

== Ordinaries ==
No.	Bishop	Period in office	Notes	Coat of arms
Prelates of Iba (August 20, 1956 – November 15, 1982)
1	Henry Charles Byrne, SSCME	November 4, 1956 – November 15, 1982 (26 years, 11 days)	First and only territorial prelate; later became first diocesan bishop	
Bishops of Iba (November 15, 1982 – present)
1	Henry Charles Byrne, SSCME	November 15, 1982 – July 16, 1983 (243 days)	Retired days before death	
2	Paciano Basilio Ancieto	October 20, 1983 – March 14, 1989 (5 years, 145 days)	Installed Archbishop of San Fernando	
3	Deogracias Soriano Iñiguez Jr.	March 3, 1990 – June 28, 2003 (13 years, 117 days)	Appointed Bishop of Kalookan	
4	Florentino Galang Lavarias	September 1, 2004 – October 27, 2014 (10 years, 56 days)	Installed Archbishop of San Fernando	
5	Bartolome Gaspar Santos Jr.	May 25, 2018 – present (8 years, 122 days)		

== Priests from the Diocese of Iba who became bishops ==
- Daniel O. Presto, 6th Bishop of the Diocese of San Fernando de La Union.
- Teodoro Bacani, 1st Bishop of the Diocese of Novaliches (2003).

== See also ==
- Catholic Church in the Philippines
- List of Catholic dioceses in the Philippines
