= Iba Cathedral =

Roman Catholic church in Zambales, Philippines

Iba Cathedral (St. Augustine Cathedral Parish)
- Saint Augustine Cathedral Parish
- Parokyang Katedral ni San Agustin (Filipino); Parroquia Catedral de San Agustín (Spanish)
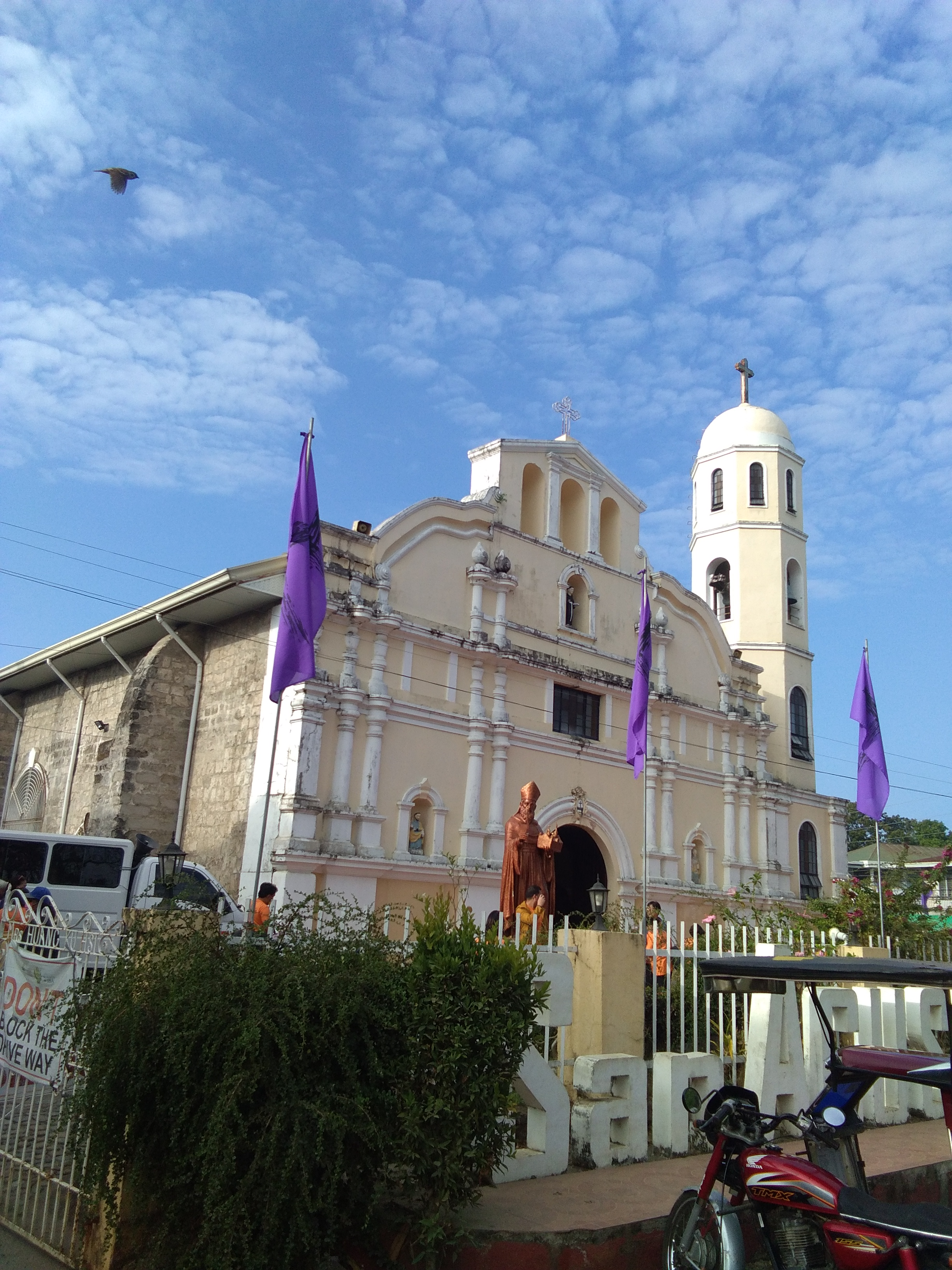
- Iba Cathedral in 2023

- Location in Luzon Location in the Philippines
- 15°19′33″N 119°58′47″E
- Location: Iba, Zambales
- Country: Philippines
- Denomination: Roman Catholic

History
- Former name: St. Augustine Parish
- Status: Cathedral
- Founded: 1681
- Dedication: Saint Augustine of Hippo

Architecture
- Functional status: Active
- Architectural type: Church building
- Style: Baroque

Administration
- Province: Zambales
- Archdiocese: San Fernando
- Diocese: Iba

Clergy
- Bishop: Bartolome Gaspar Santos
- Rector: Rev. Fr. Gerald Mariano M. Pascual

Saint Augustine Cathedral Parish, commonly known as Iba Cathedral, is a cathedral parish of the Roman Catholic Church located in the municipality of Iba, Zambales, Philippines. It is dedicated to Saint Augustine of Hippo and is the episcopal seat of the Diocese of Iba which covers Zambales and Olongapo.

== History ==
In the early decades of Spanish colonization, the territory of Zambales included parts of present-day Pangasinan and Bataan. The Augustinian Recollects were the first to spread Catholicism in the province. Opposition and conflicts with the local Aetas prompted the Recollects to build a fort in an area called Playa Honda which served as a refuge for the new converts. Iba, also spelled as "Yba" and formerly named as "Paynawen", was eventually founded in 1611 as a visita of Masinloc. It became a parish of its own in 1681.

The Recollects led the construction of the church of Iba in the 18th century. It is made of coral and limestone, the same materials used to build other churches in the province such as those in Masinloc and Botolan. The church was the venue of the session of the Second Philippine Commission under William Howard Taft which founded the province of Zambales on August 28, 1901. The church administration in the province went to the Society of the Divine Word in 1928 and the Columban Fathers in 1951. It became the cathedral of the Prelature of Iba in 1955 and also when it was elevated to a diocese in 1982.

== Gallery ==
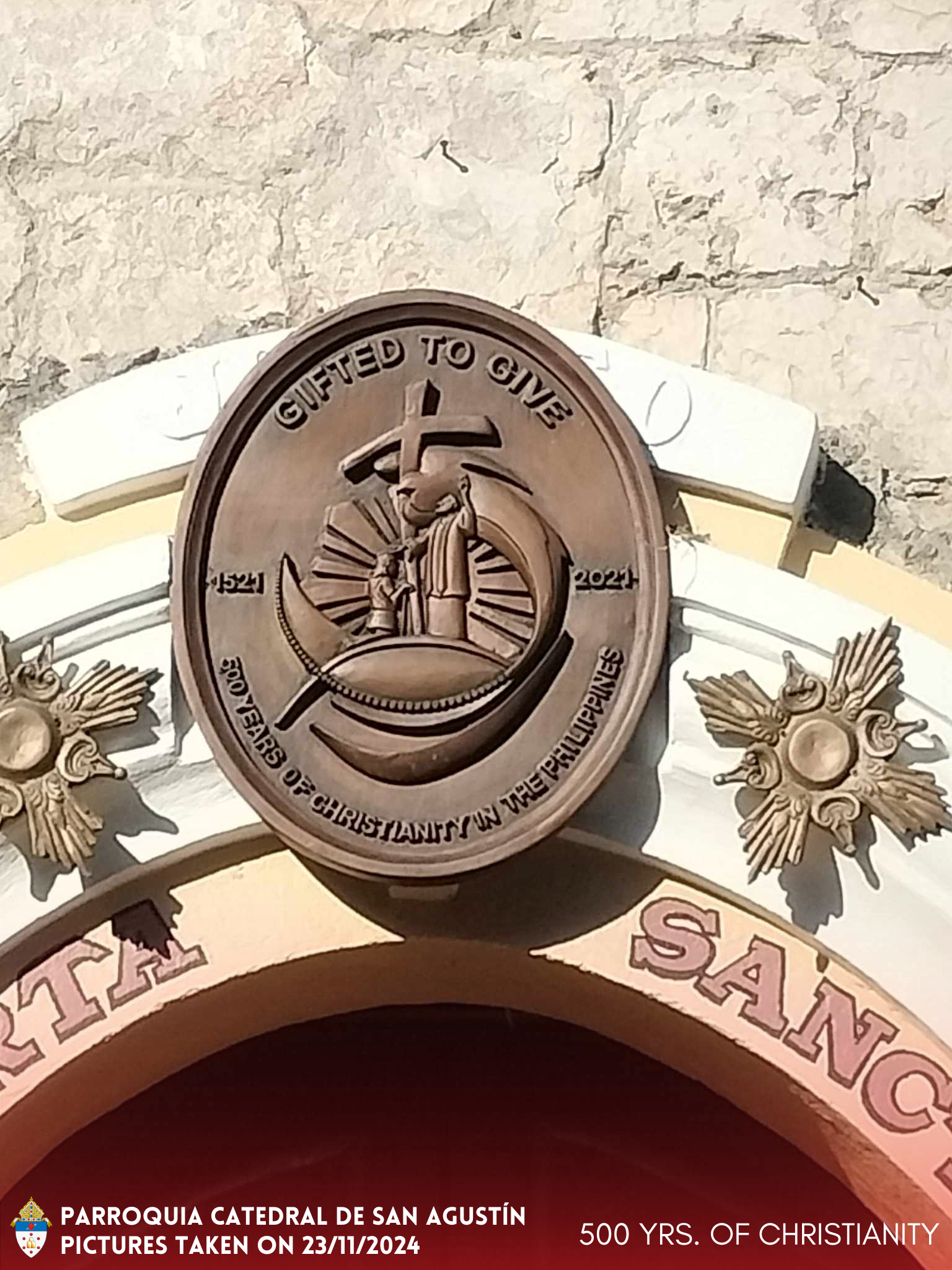
LOCATED ABOVE THE JUBILEE DOOR

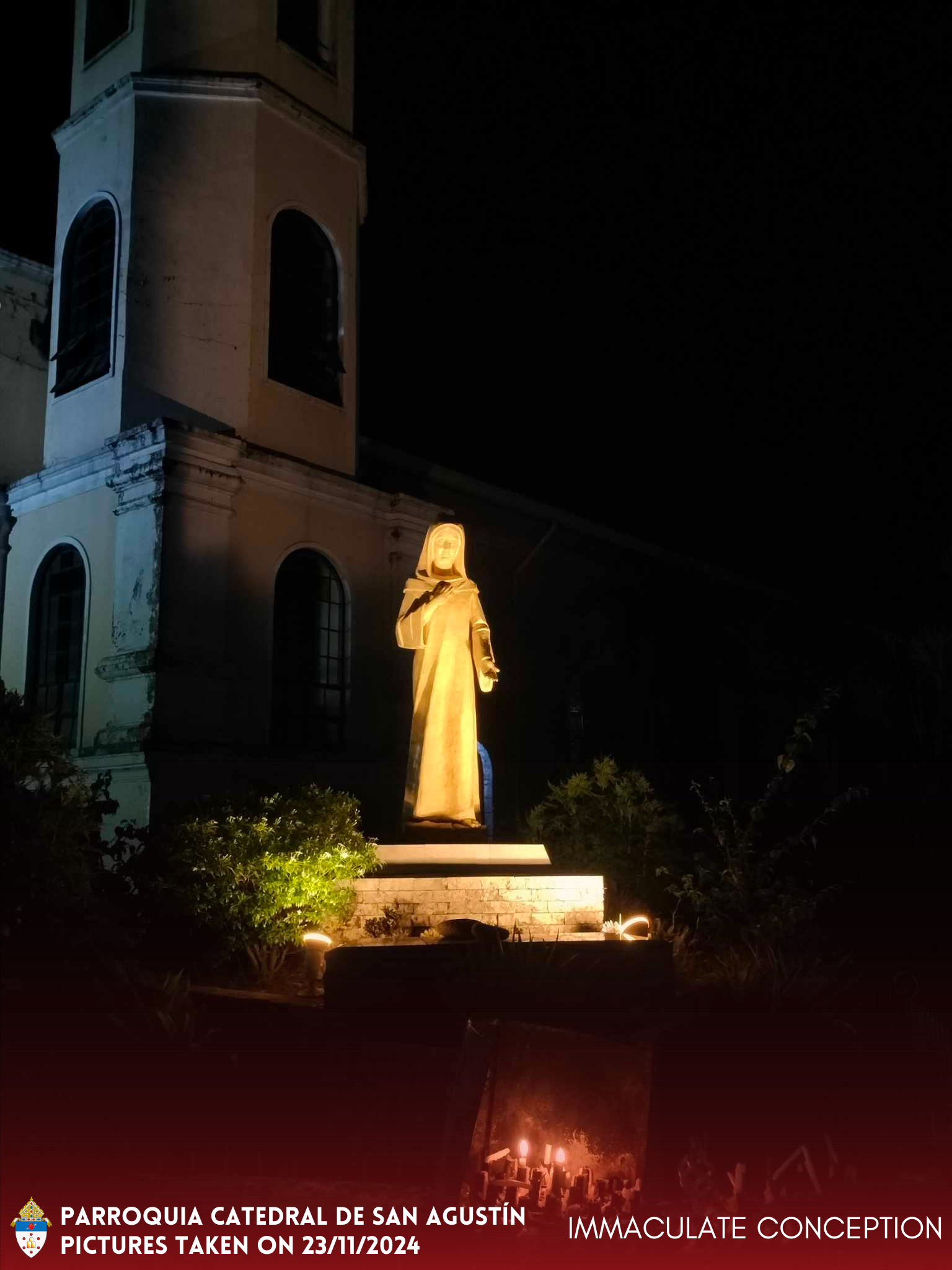
LOCATED NEAR THE OCTAGONAL BELL TOWER, THIS WAS CAPTURED AROUND 9PM
