= Malolos Cathedral =

Latin Catholic cathedral in Bulacan, Philippines

- Cathedral-Basilica Minore and Parish of the Immaculate Conception; Immaculate Conception Parish Cathedral and Minor Basilica
- Basilika Menor at Katedral ng Kalinis-linisang Paglilihi (Filipino); Basílica Menor y Catedral de la Inmaculada Concepción (Spanish)
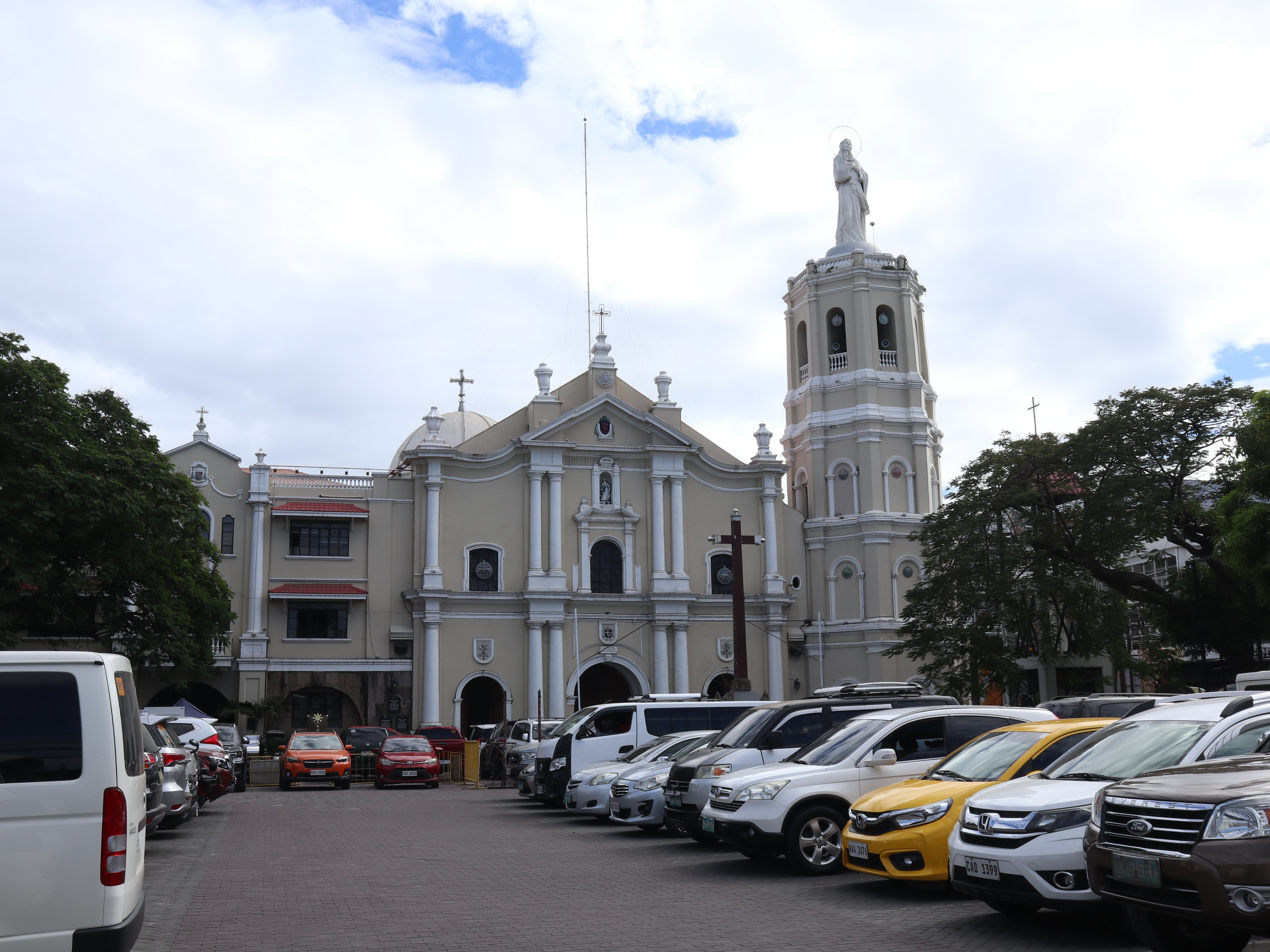
- The cathedral in February 2024

- Location in Bulacan Location in Luzon Location in the Philippines
- 14°50′32″N 120°48′41″E
- Location: Malolos, Bulacan
- Country: Philippines
- Denomination: Catholic Church
- Sui iuris church: Latin Church
- Tradition: Roman Rite

History
- Status: Cathedral and Minor Basilica
- Founded: 1580
- Dedication: Immaculate Conception
- Consecrated: 1826

Architecture
- Heritage designation: Palacio Presidencial
- Designated: 1951
- Style: Neoclassical
- Groundbreaking: 1580–1591

Specifications
- Capacity: 2,000

Administration
- Province: Manila
- Diocese: Malolos
- Deanery: Immaculate Conception
- Parish: Immaculate Conception

Clergy
- Bishop: Dennis Villarojo
- Rector: Roberto "Bobby" Mariano
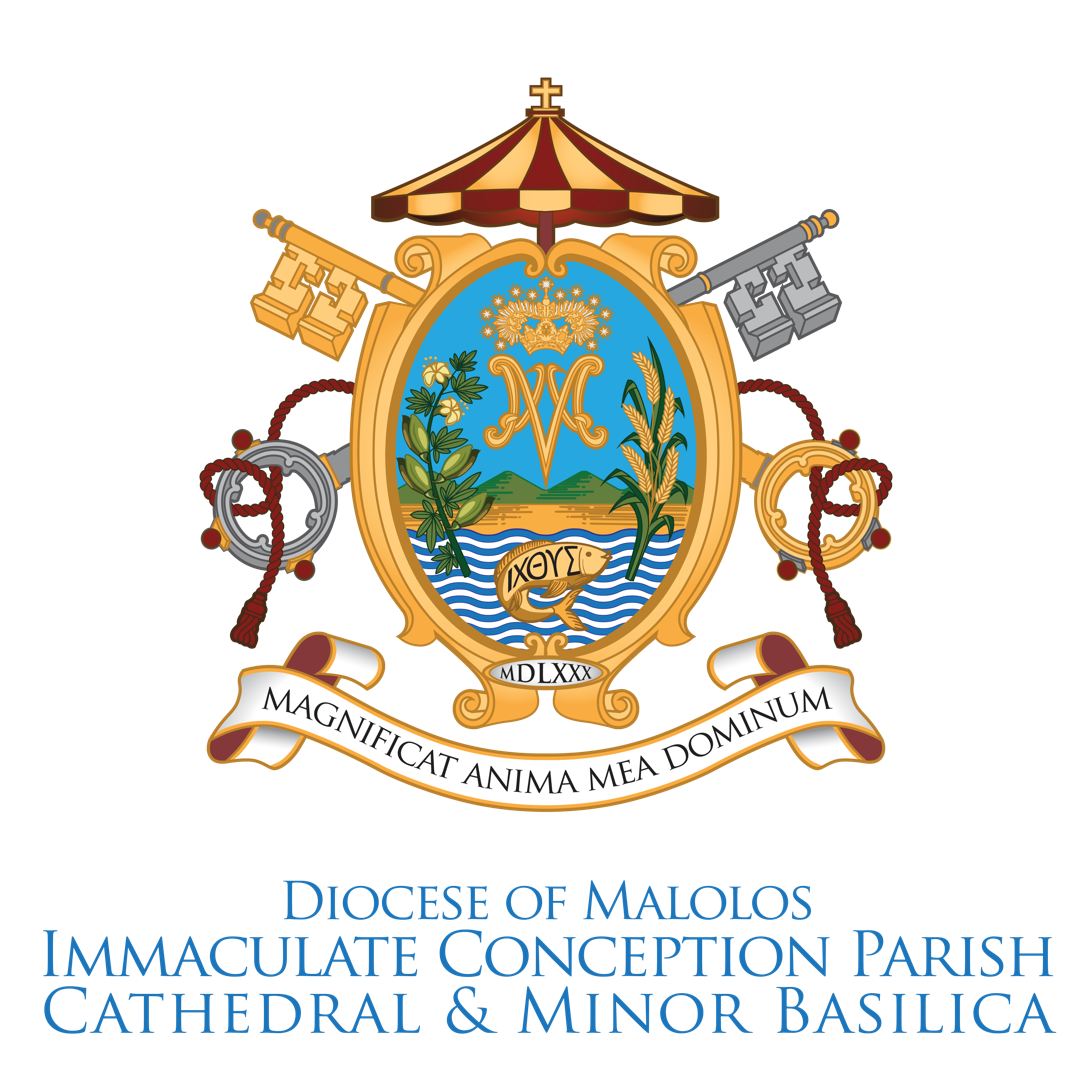

The Cathedral-Basilica Minore and Parish of the Immaculate Conception, (Note: Filipino: Basilika Menor at Katedral ng Kalinis-linisang Paglilihi; Spanish: Basílica Menor y Catedral de la Inmaculada Concepción) commonly known as Malolos Cathedral, is a Latin Catholic minor basilica and cathedral in the city of Malolos, Bulacan in the Philippines. The cathedral is the see of the Bishop of Malolos, a suffragan of the Archdiocese of Manila. The shrine is dedicated to the Blessed Virgin Mary of the Immaculate Conception.

Pope John XXIII granted the decree Christi Fidelium Consulere which elevated the shrine as a Cathedral on 25 November 1962. Pope John Paul II later raised the shrine to the status of Minor Basilica via decree on 9 April 1999. Pope Benedict XVI granted a decree of Pontifical decree of coronation towards its enshrined Marian image on 11 May 2011. The rite of coronation was executed on 10 March 2012.

== History ==
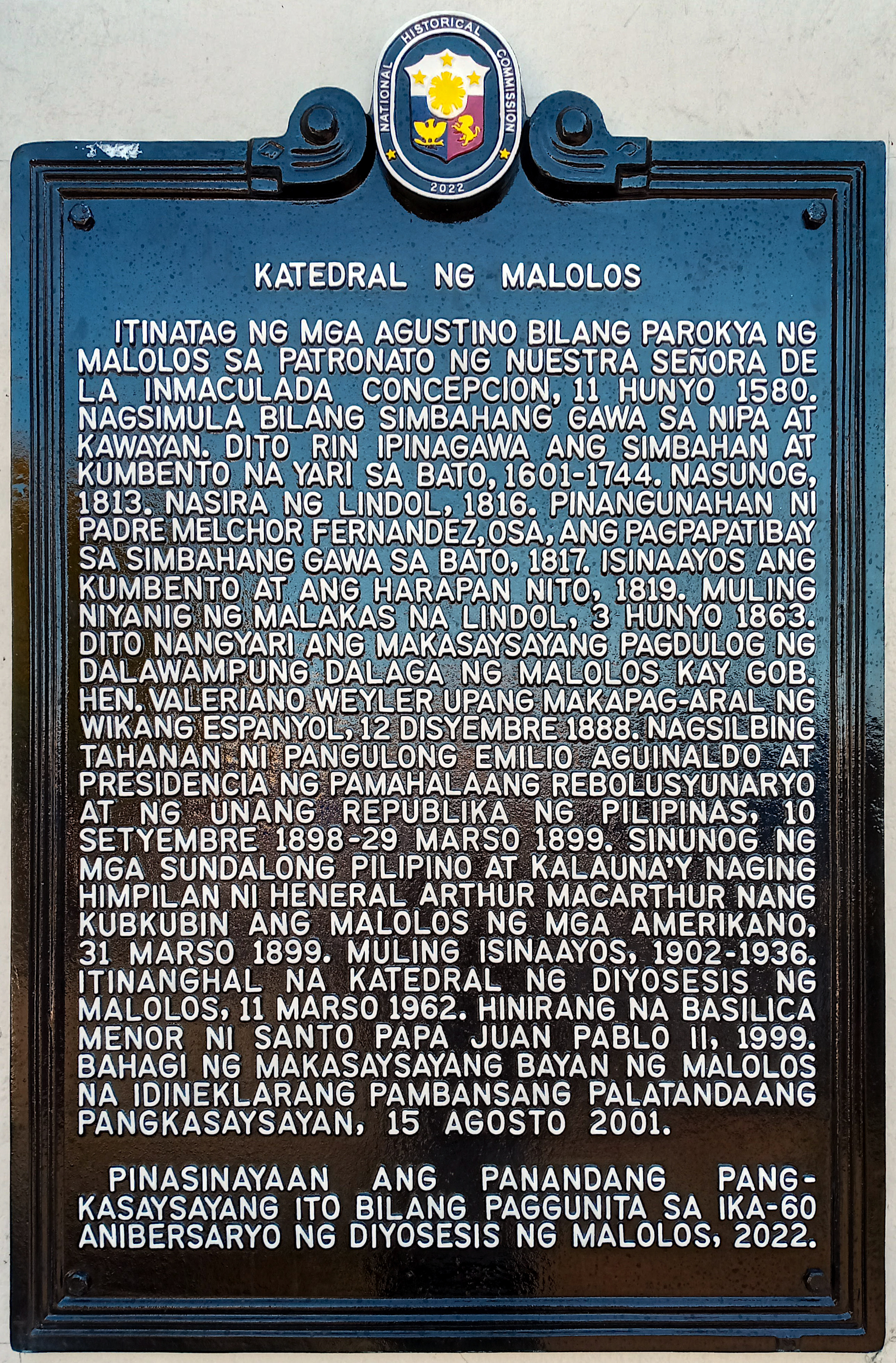
Church NHC historical marker installed in 2022

The parish dates back to the arrival of Spanish missionaries to Malolos in 1580, and the establishment of an Augustinian monastery. The first church and convent were built in 1591 of modest means. The congregation was formally established as a parish until 1673, the same year the town of Malolos was incorporated. The original church complex was expanded in 1691, and entirely reconstructed from 1734–1744.

In 1813, a fire destroyed both the church and convent, and reconstruction was started in 1819. The new church was consecrated by Francisco Alban, bishop of Nueva Segovia on October 18, 1826. The earthquakes of 1863 and 1880 both damaged the church, and restorations were undertaken from 1859–1872 and in 1883.

On September 10, 1898, the convent was appropriated by General Emilio Aguinaldo and used as the presidential palace for the First Philippine Republic. On March 31, 1899, as they were fleeing from the American army, Aguinaldo ordered General Antonio Luna to set fire to the complex as part of their scorched-earth policy.

During the American occupation of the Philippines, the church and convent were gradually rebuilt and renovated. A new baptistery was dedicated in 1954, and the roof replaced in 1955–1961.

The church was renovated further in preparation for its designation as a cathedral after the diocese of Malolos was created in 1962. It was consecrated as a cathedral by its second bishop, Rev. Cirilo Almario Jr., in 1976.

From 1990–1992, a chapel of Eucharistic adoration was built, the baptistery was converted to a mortuary chapel, and a crypt was built beneath the high altar.

On April 9, 1999, the cathedral was elevated by Pope John Paul II to a minor basilica dedicated to the Immaculate Conception. A Catholic Mass was later offered with festivities for its inauguration ceremony on December 4, 1999.

== Architecture ==
The cathedral's architecture is primarily Neoclassical with Baroque influences and moderate ornamentation.

=== Gallery ===
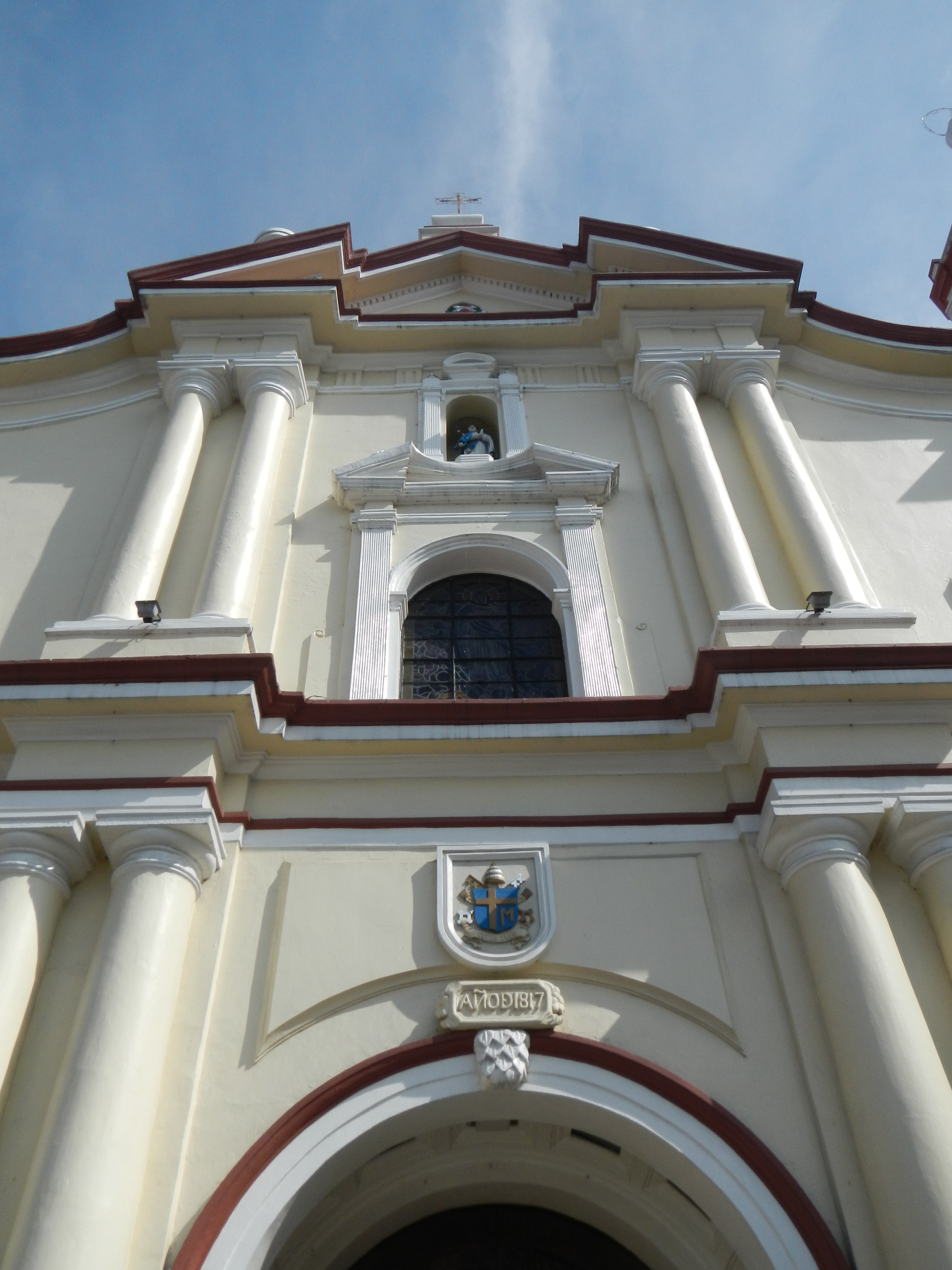
Close view of the facade

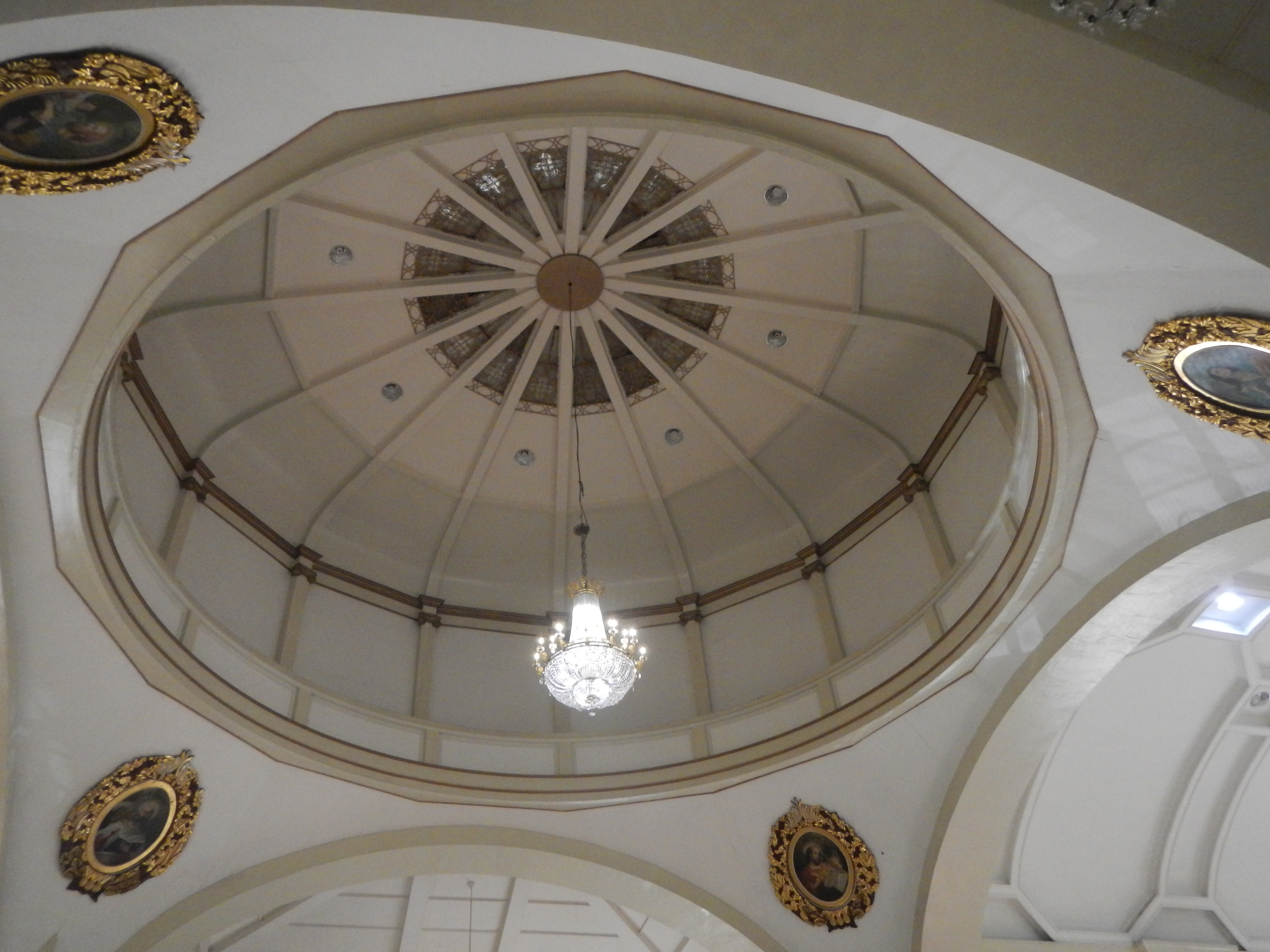
Cupola interior

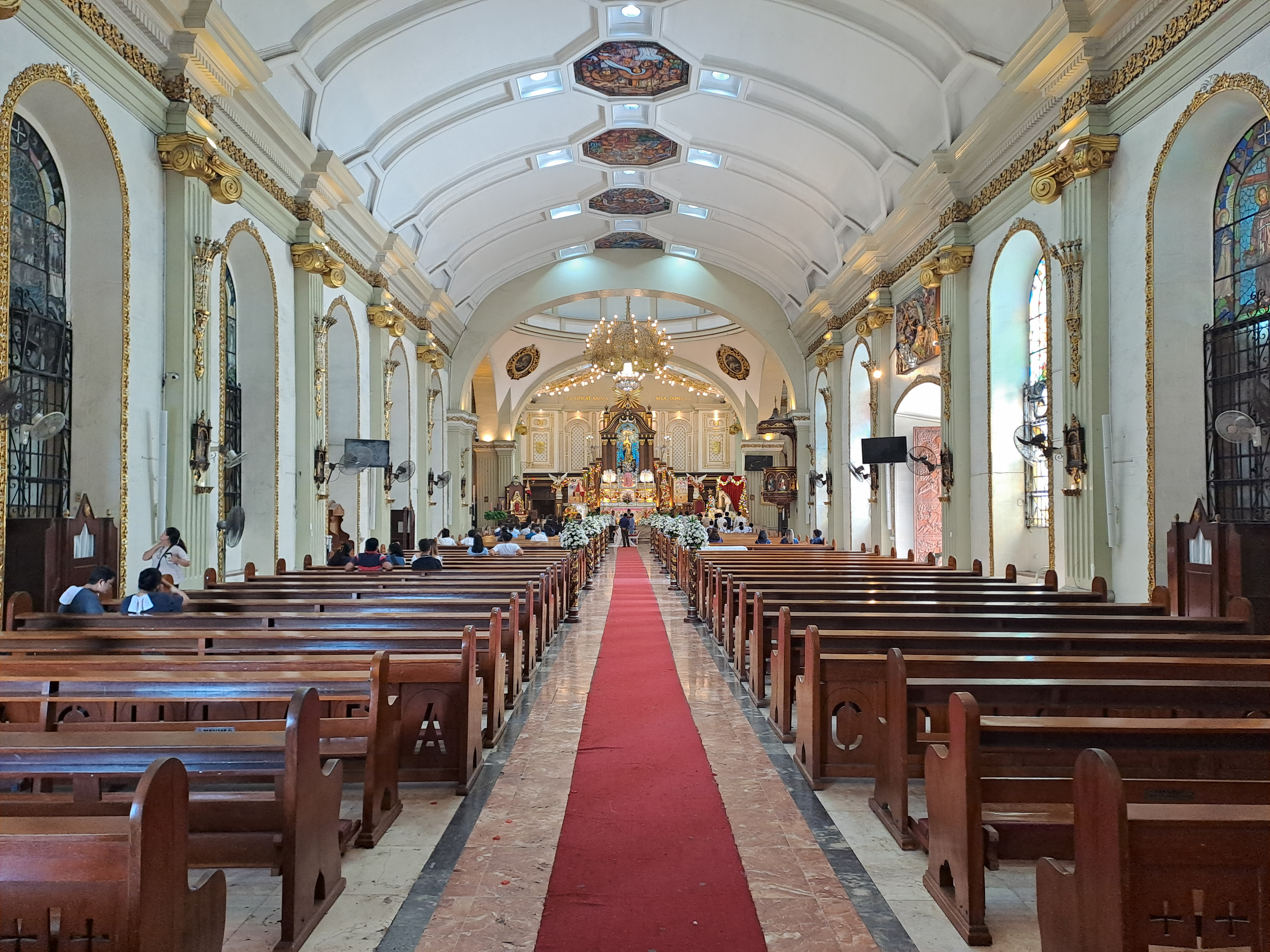
Cathedral interior in 2023

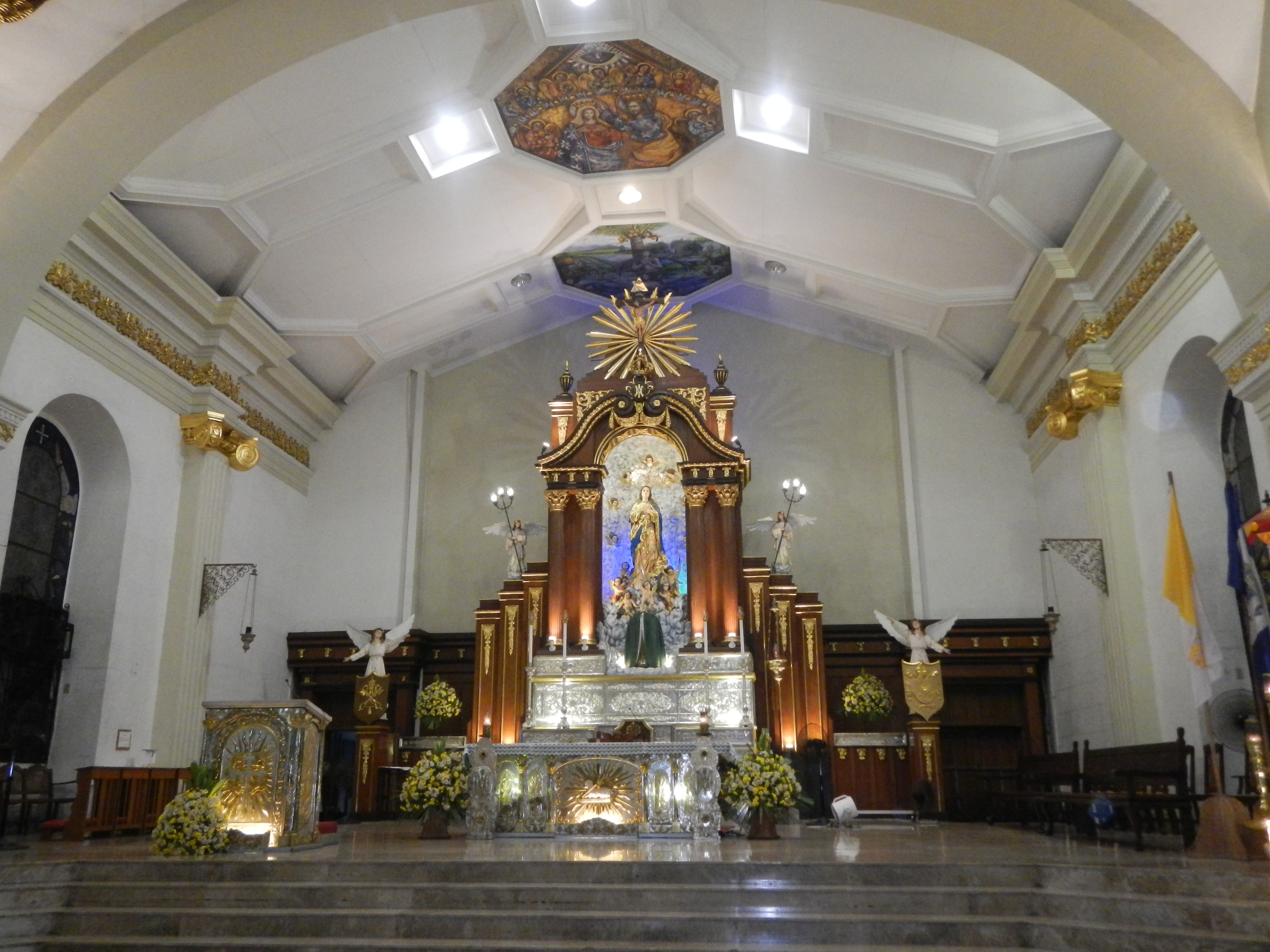
Sanctuary and high altar

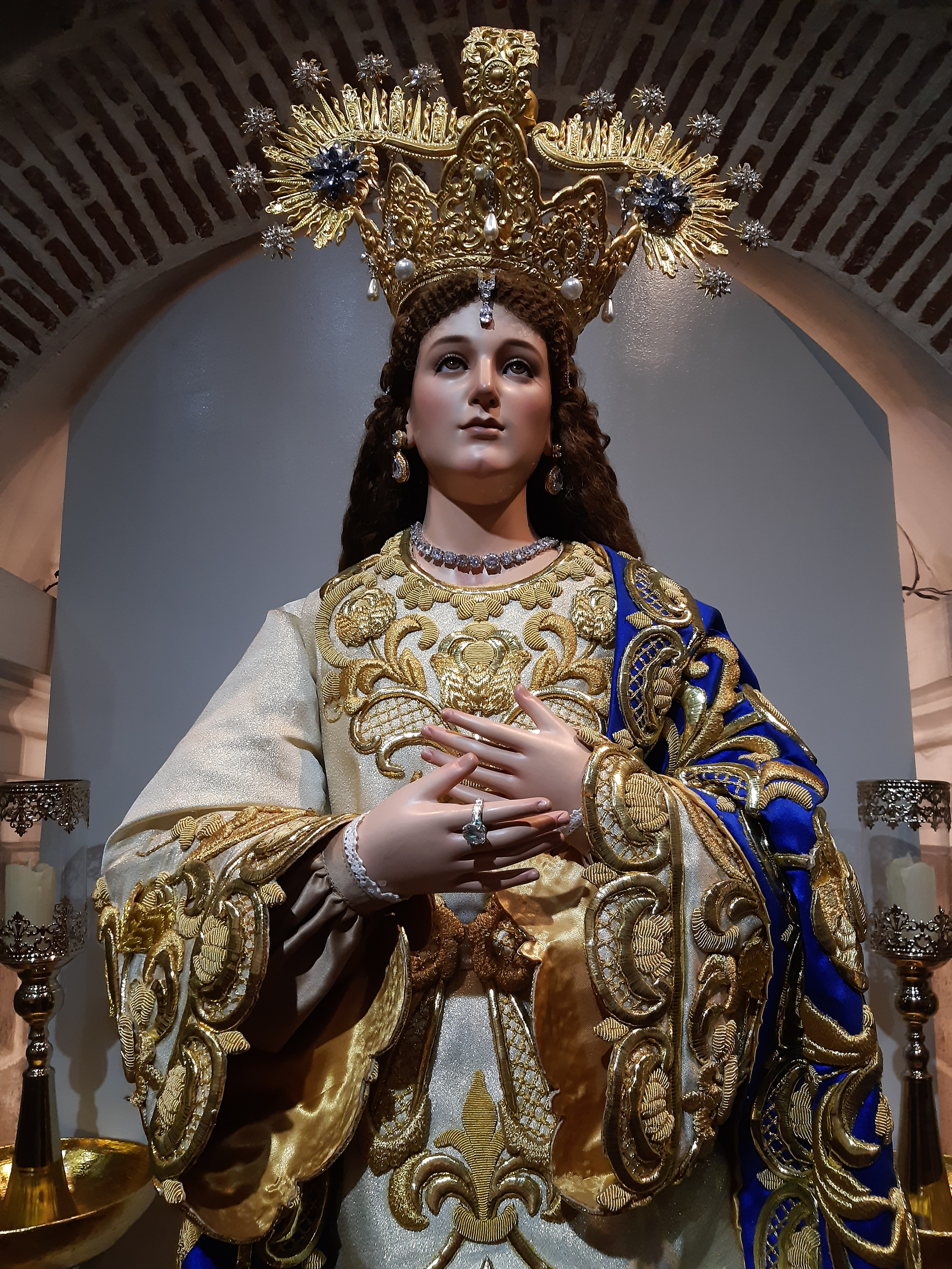
The Vicaria Image of Virgen Inmaculada Concepcion de Malolos

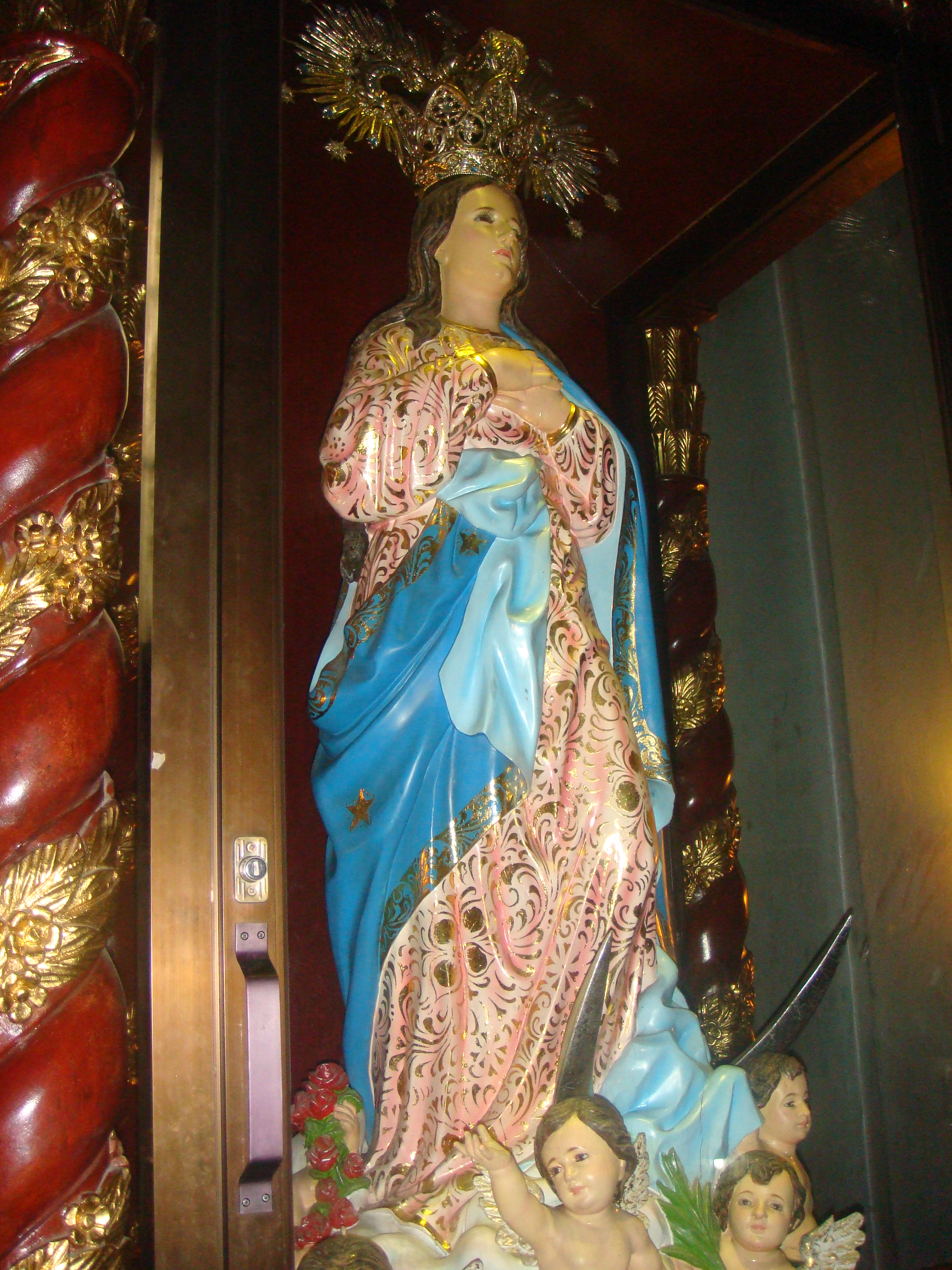
The processional image of Virgen Inmaculada Concepcion de Malolos
