= Uxua =

Uxua may refer to:

- Uxua López (born 1983), Spanish telecommunications engineer, environmental activist
- UxuA RNA motif
- UXUA Casa Hotel & Spa, located in Trancoso, Bahia, Brazil
