= Barásoain =

- Municipality
- Flag Coat of arms

- Location in Spain
- Coordinates: 42°36′13″N 1°38′47″W
- Country: Spain
- Autonomous community: Navarra
- Province: Navarre
- Comarca: Tafalla
- Judicial district: Tafalla

Government
  - Mayor: Rita Delia Roldán Murillo

Area
  - Total: 13.94 km^{2} (5.38 sq mi)
- Elevation: 523 m (1,716 ft)
- Highest elevation: 644 m (2,113 ft)
- Lowest elevation: 492 m (1,614 ft)

Population (2025-01-01)
  - Total: 601
  - Density: 43.1/km^{2} (112/sq mi)
- Demonym: Barasoaindarra
- Time zone: UTC+1 (CET)
  - Summer (DST): UTC+2 (CEST)
- Postal code: 31395
- Website: Official website

Barásoain is a town and municipality in the autonomous community of Navarre, northern Spain, within the historical lands of the Basque Country (greater region). located approximately 25 km south of Pamplona, the provincial capital. As of 2019 the population stood at 621. Nordex has a production facility of nacelles.

== Geography ==
Barasoain is located 25 km south of Pamplona and 15 km north of Tafalla, on a promontory of 523 m above sea level. The point of lowest altitude of the village is situated at 492 meters, on the river Zidacos bank, and the highest is Mount Artebeltz, at 644 metres. It is the largest village in the Orba valley, known as the Valdorba which was made famous by the legendary singer songwriter Benito Lertxundi

=== Neighbouring municipalities ===
The municipality of Barásoain is closely linked to its neighbouring township, Garínoain. Despite their administrative borders, separated by a street, both municipalities form a single urban conglomeration. Other surrounding municipalities are (clockwise starting from west) are Artajona, Añorbe, Tirapu, Olcoz, Unzué and Olóriz.

=== Climate ===
Barásoain is located in a transitional climatic region. It borders the Oceanic and the Mediterranean climates, showing a pattern influenced by both. It is, nevertheless, classified as having an oceanic climate (Köppen Cfb).

Climate data for Barásoain (1975-2004)
Month	Jan	Feb	Mar	Apr	May	Jun	Jul	Aug	Sep	Oct	Nov	Dec	Year
Record high °C (°F)	20 (68)	22 (72)	27 (81)	29 (84)	36 (97)	40 (104)	42 (108)	41 (106)	37 (99)	31 (88)	25 (77)	18 (64)	42 (108)
Mean daily maximum °C (°F)	9.5 (49.1)	11.1 (52.0)	14.5 (58.1)	15.5 (59.9)	20.1 (68.2)	24.7 (76.5)	27.9 (82.2)	28.5 (83.3)	23.7 (74.7)	18.5 (65.3)	12.7 (54.9)	9.6 (49.3)	18.0 (64.4)
Daily mean °C (°F)	5.7 (42.3)	6.7 (44.1)	9.3 (48.7)	10.2 (50.4)	14.3 (57.7)	18.2 (64.8)	21.0 (69.8)	21.7 (71.1)	17.8 (64.0)	13.6 (56.5)	8.5 (47.3)	5.9 (42.6)	12.7 (54.9)
Mean daily minimum °C (°F)	1.8 (35.2)	2.3 (36.1)	4.1 (39.4)	5.0 (41.0)	8.5 (47.3)	11.7 (53.1)	14.2 (57.6)	14.9 (58.8)	11.9 (53.4)	8.7 (47.7)	4.2 (39.6)	2.3 (36.1)	7.5 (45.5)
Record low °C (°F)	−8 (18)	−9 (16)	−10 (14)	−3 (27)	0 (32)	2 (36)	2.5 (36.5)	7 (45)	2 (36)	−3 (27)	−7 (19)	−11 (12)	−11 (12)
Average precipitation mm (inches)	52 (2.0)	36 (1.4)	33 (1.3)	62 (2.4)	54 (2.1)	45 (1.8)	28 (1.1)	33 (1.3)	43 (1.7)	53 (2.1)	60 (2.4)	56 (2.2)	554 (21.8)
Average precipitation days	11	10	8	12	11	5	4	4	5	10	10	10	99
Average snowy days	1.1	1	.6	.5	0	0	0	0	0	0	0.5	0.7	4.4
Source: Gobierno de Navarra

== Government ==
Barásoain belongs to the Judicial district of Tafalla, within the merindad de Olite, one of the five merindades, the Medieval administrative subdivision that has historically divided the region of Navarre.

List of mayors
Term of office	Mayor	Political party
1995–1999	Juan José Liberal Fernández	independent
1999–2003	Carlos Enrique Izuriaga Eslava	independent
2003–2007	Carlos Enrique Izuriaga Eslava	independent
2007–2011	Carlos Enrique Izuriaga Eslava	independent
2011-	Rita Delia Roldán Murillo	independent

== Demography ==
Although the population of Barásoain has been either static or slowly declining for the 20th century, there has been an upturn in the figures in recent years due to the new residential development. The village has physically expanded and new people from other places have come to Barasoain, mostly from Pamplona.

Demographic evolution
1897	1900	1910	1920	1930	1940	1950	1960	1970	1981	1991	2001	2006	2010	2019
617	638	650	636	651	679	594	572	551	462	421	509	636	656	621

== Economy ==
The wind turbine manufacturer Nordex has a nacelle production facility in Barásoain.

== Famous citizens ==
- Martín de Azpilcueta(1492–1586). Spanish canonist and theologian in his time, and an early economist, known as Doctor Navarrus
- José Julián de Aranguren (1801–1861). Archbishop of Manila (Filipinas)
- Manuel Turrillas (1905–1997), "Maestro Turrillas", one of the most popular composers of Navarra; composed the most popular hymns of the main San Fermines Associations', Aldapa, Anaitasuna, La Jarana, Muthiko, Oberena, and the Osasuna football club hymn.
