= Barasoain Church =

Roman Catholic church in Bulacan, Philippines

Barásoain Church
- Our Lady of Mount Carmel Parish
- Nuestra Señora del Carmen de Barásoain (Spanish); Parokya ng Mahal na Birhen ng Bundok ng Carmelo (Filipino)
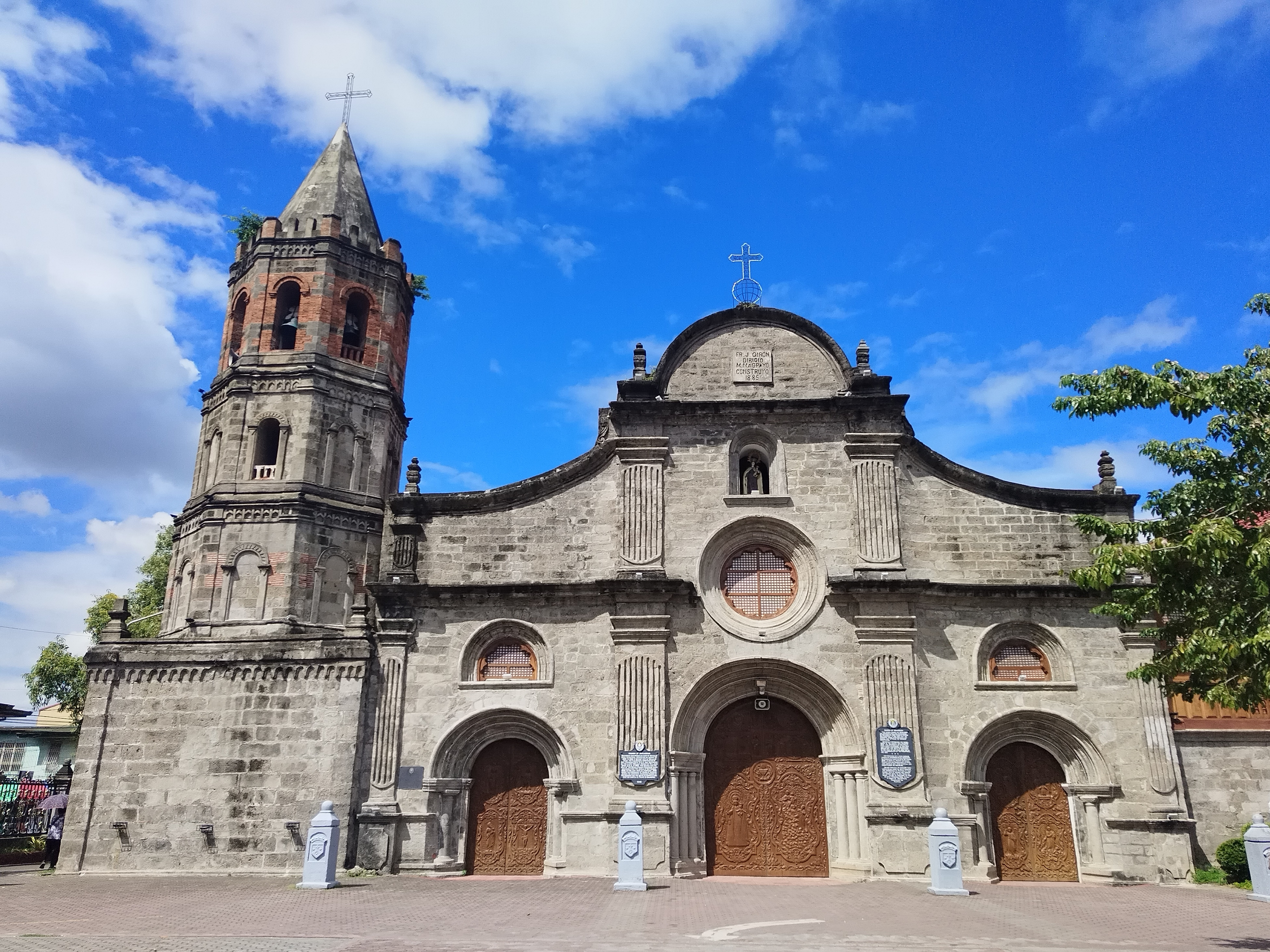
- Church facade in 2023

- Location in Bulacan Location in Luzon Location in the Philippines
- 14°50′48″N 120°48′46″E
- Location: Malolos, Bulacan
- Country: Philippines
- Denomination: Roman Catholic
- Website: www.barasoainchurch.org

History
- Status: Parish church
- Founded: August 31, 1859
- Dedication: Our Lady of Mount Carmel
- Events: Philippine Revolution; Philippine–American War

Architecture
- Functional status: Active
- Heritage designation: Seat of the First Philippine Republic
- Designated: August 1, 1973
- Architect: Miguel Magpayo
- Architectural type: Church building
- Style: Baroque Renaissance Revival
- Groundbreaking: 1885
- Completed: 1888

Specifications
- Materials: Adobe and concrete

Administration
- District: West
- Province: Manila
- Diocese: Malolos

Clergy
- Rector: Domingo M. Salonga
- Vicar: Niño Jomel H. De Leon

Our Lady of Mount Carmel Parish, also known as Barásoain Church (Tagalog: [baɾaswaˈʔin]; Spanish: [baˈɾa.so.ãĩn]), is a Roman Catholic church built in 1888 in Malolos, Bulacán, Philippines. It is under the jurisdiction of the Diocese of Malolos and is about 42 kilometers (26 mi) from Manila. Having earned the title as the "Cradle of Democracy in the East, the most important religious building in the Philippines," and the site of the First Philippine Republic, the church is proverbial for its historical importance among Filipinos.

== Etymology ==
The name "Barásoain" is from Barásoain in Navarre, Spain, the birthplace of José Julián de Aranguren, OSA (February 16, 1801 – April 18, 1861). He served as the 22nd Archbishop of Manila from 1847 to 1861.

== History ==
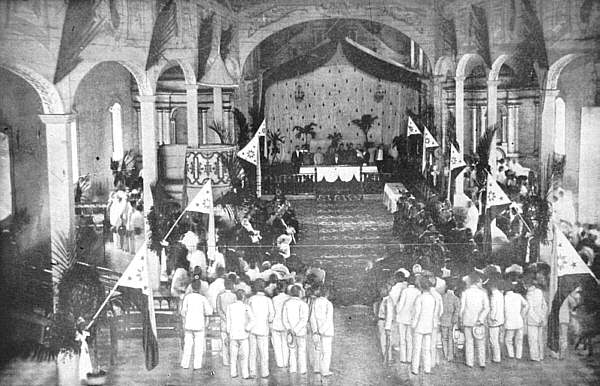
Opening of the Malolos Congress in 1898

Barásoain was originally known as "Bangkál", a part of Encomienda of Malolos integrated by Miguel López de Legaspi with the town of Calumpit to the west on April 5, 1572. When the Augustinian friars made Malolos a separate town in 1580, Bangkál became a village under the jurisdiction of the town church. A hermitage made of nipa and bamboo was constructed near the river between Maluslos (Malolos población) and Barasoain for the people of Bangkál. In that same year, Malolos curate and Vicar Forane Fray Agustín Carreno, OSA established the first chapel at the old ermita of the old Cemetery of Malolos. Abandoned in 1680, it served as the temporary chapel-of-ease of Barásoain, located in front of the Casa Tribunal (Presidencia), which is now commonly called Casa Real de Malolos. A fire in the 17th century destroyed the new church.

Another church building was commissioned and constructed on a new site, its present location—corner of Paseo del Congreso and Antonio Bautista streets. Under the supervision of Francisco Royo, the new church was built, made of light materials. In 1884, the temporary church burnt down during Flores de Mayo celebrations.

From 1630 to 1859, priests serving in Barásoain were from the nearby mother church of the town, the Parroquia de la Inmaculada Concepción de Malolos. Since the formal establishment of Barásoain as an independent parish to Malolos Church in 1859, several priests were assigned by the Augustinian Order, and later by the Archdiocese of Manila and Diocese of Malolos.

=== Separation of Barásoain and construction of the church ===
In 1859, Barásoain was separated from Malolos. As a new town and parish, the Our Lady of Mount Carmel was chosen to be its patroness. Francisco Arriola was appointed first parish priest on June 1, 1859, and he built the convent. A small ermita, constructed by Melchor Fernández in 1816 while he was parish priest of Malolos (1816–1840), served as the temporary parish church. One of the existing bells bears the year 1870; installed by Emeterio Rupérez, it was donated by the "principalía (sic) of Malolos." The bell was also dedicated to the Our Lady of Mount Carmel of Barásoain. Francisco Royo replaced the temporary chapel with a hewn stone church built between 1871 and 1878. This was soon destroyed by fire. The only remnant of this church is one of its bells, installed by Royo in 1873 and dedicated to Saint Francis Xavier. Juan Girón, who succeeded him, used the chapel of the cemetery until this one, too, was destroyed by the earthquakes of 1880. Girón then built a temporary chapel of nipa and bamboo which was burned down in 1884, during the solemn celebrations of the Feast of Our Lady of Mount Carmel.

In 1885, Girón hired contractor Miguel Magpayo and began construction of a massive church made of masonry and brick. The church was completed under Girón's supervision. Jorde does not specify the year of its completion; he says only that, "at the time it was completed the pockets of Girón were drained."

In 1889, Martín Arconada started construction of the belfry and the restoration of the convent. Three bells were installed in 1897. One of them was donated by Arconada and dedicated to his namesake, Saint Martin of Tours. In 1894, Miguel de Vera undertook another restoration of the convent.

=== Philippine Revolution and the Malolos Congress ===
As tensions were brewing between the Filipino revolutionaries and the Americans who have arrived in the country in the wake of the Spanish–American War, the Philippine Revolutionary Government under the leadership of Emilio Aguinaldo decided to evacuate the capital north from Cavite to Malolos. Plans were made to write a new constitution for the soon to be proclaimed Philippine Republic; Barásoain Church was chosen to be the site of the First Philippine Congress, otherwise known as the Malolos Congress, which convened on September 15, 1898 to draft the Malolos Constitution.

On January 21, 1899, the Malolos Constitution was ratified. This paved the way for the formal inauguration of the First Philippine Republic on January 23, 1899) with Emilio Aguinaldo taking oath as president. The outbreak of the Philippine-American War on February 4 plunged the Republic into crisis, and the Malolos Congress held its last session in the last week of February as the Aguinaldo government evacuated for Nueva Ecija.

On March 31, 1899, American forces captured Malolos and Barásoain, which were placed under military control.

=== Reunification with Malolos and subsequent events ===
In 1903, the town of Barásoain was dissolved and re-annexed to Malolos.

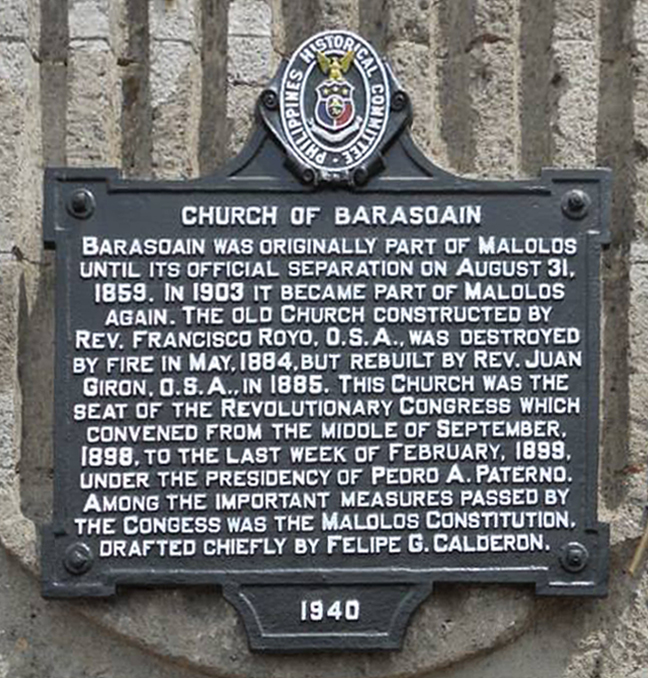
Church PHC historical marker installed in 1940

By Presidential Decree No. 260, Barásoain Church was proclaimed as a National Shrine by President Ferdinand Marcos on August 1, 1973. A museum was opened at the old convent of the church which is being managed by the National Historical Commission of the Philippines.

In the wake of the 1998 Philippine Centennial celebrations, the church became the venue for the inauguration of Joseph Estrada on June 30, 1998.

=== Philippine bill issue ===
The image of the church has been depicted in certain monetary bills until July 2001, namely the English series one peso bill and the Pilipino, Ang Bagong Lipunan, and both the 1985–1997 and 1997–2001 New Design series ten peso bill together with an image of Apolinario Mabini (with Andrés Bonifacio on the 1997 version) on the other side. However, it was replaced by a ten-peso coin without the representation of the church. In 2009, local priests and Laban ng Bulacan movement officials, led by then-chairman John Paul Albert Limpo, initiated a signature campaign to appeal to the Philippine Bangko Sentral restoring at least the image of the church in any present Philippine bill.

After three years of petition and conceptualization of the "New Generation Currency" from 2007 to 2010, and 9 years and 4 months since the last printing of the ten peso bill at the said month of 2001, Barásoain Church was featured again upon the start of print run of a new series on November 2010, this time in the 200-peso denomination, with the facade from 2010 to 2017 and its interior from 2017 to 2020 with a scene of the opening of the Malolos Congress.

=== 2025 Wedding in the flood ===
On July 22, 2025, Jade Rick Verdillo and Jamaica Aguilar were married at historic Barasoain Church in Malolos, Bulacan, despite severe flooding caused by Typhoon Wipha and the southwest monsoon. The wedding received coverage from major Philippine media, including Mark Salazar from GMA News, ABS-CBN News, the Philippine Daily Inquirer and other local news.

The photographs by Associated Press photographer Aaron Favila brought the Barasoain Church wedding to an international audience. His images were featured by major international media organizations, including BBC, CNN and ABC news, and published across Asia, Europe and North America.

One of Favila’s photographs appeared on the front page of The Wall Street Journal on July 23, 2025, with the headline “A Nice Day for a Wet Wedding in the Philippines.” The front page identified the couple, Jamaica Aguilar and Jade Rick Verdillo, and credited the photograph to Aaron Favila of the Associated Press.

Favila’s photographic series, Wedding in the Flood, was subsequently recognized in the 2026 World Press Photo Contestbringing the story to an even wider international audience.

Aaron Favila’s coverage of the wedding was recognized at the 2026 World Press Photo Contest, winning the Best Stories of Asia-Pacific and Oceania – Stories category. His photographs captured the extraordinary sight of a couple continuing their wedding ceremony as floodwaters filled the historic Barasoain Church, a scene that captivated audiences and drew international attention. Numerous news reports also interviewed the couple, allowing them to share their personal experiences and the story behind their decision to continue with the wedding. What began as a personal celebration became a widely shared story of love, resilience, and hope.

== List of parish priests and rectors ==
Parish priest & rectors	Term
Francisco Arriola	1860–1869
Emiterio Ruperas	1869–1872
Francisco Royo	1873–1879
Juan Giron	1881–1889
Martin Arconada	1889–1894
Miguel Vera	1894–1895
Martin Arnada	1898–1899
Juan dela Rosa	1899–1900
Osmundo Lim	1900–1902
Carlos Inquimboy	1902–1923
Vicente Fernandez	1923–1938
Angel Cruz	1939–1942
Artemio Pascual	1943–1944
Arsenio Reyes	1944–1950
Pedro Abad	1950–1951
Jose Aguinaldo	1951–1957
Angel Pengson	1957–1987
Serafin Riego de Dios	1987–1988
Moises Andrade	1989–1993
Jose Aguilan Jr.	1993–2000
Filemon Capiral	2000–2007
Angelito J. Santiago, Jr.	2007–2013
Mario DJ Arenas	2013–2014
Rev. Msgr. Dario V. Cabral	2014–2021
Rev. Msgr. Domingo M. Salonga P.C.	2021–present

== Gallery ==
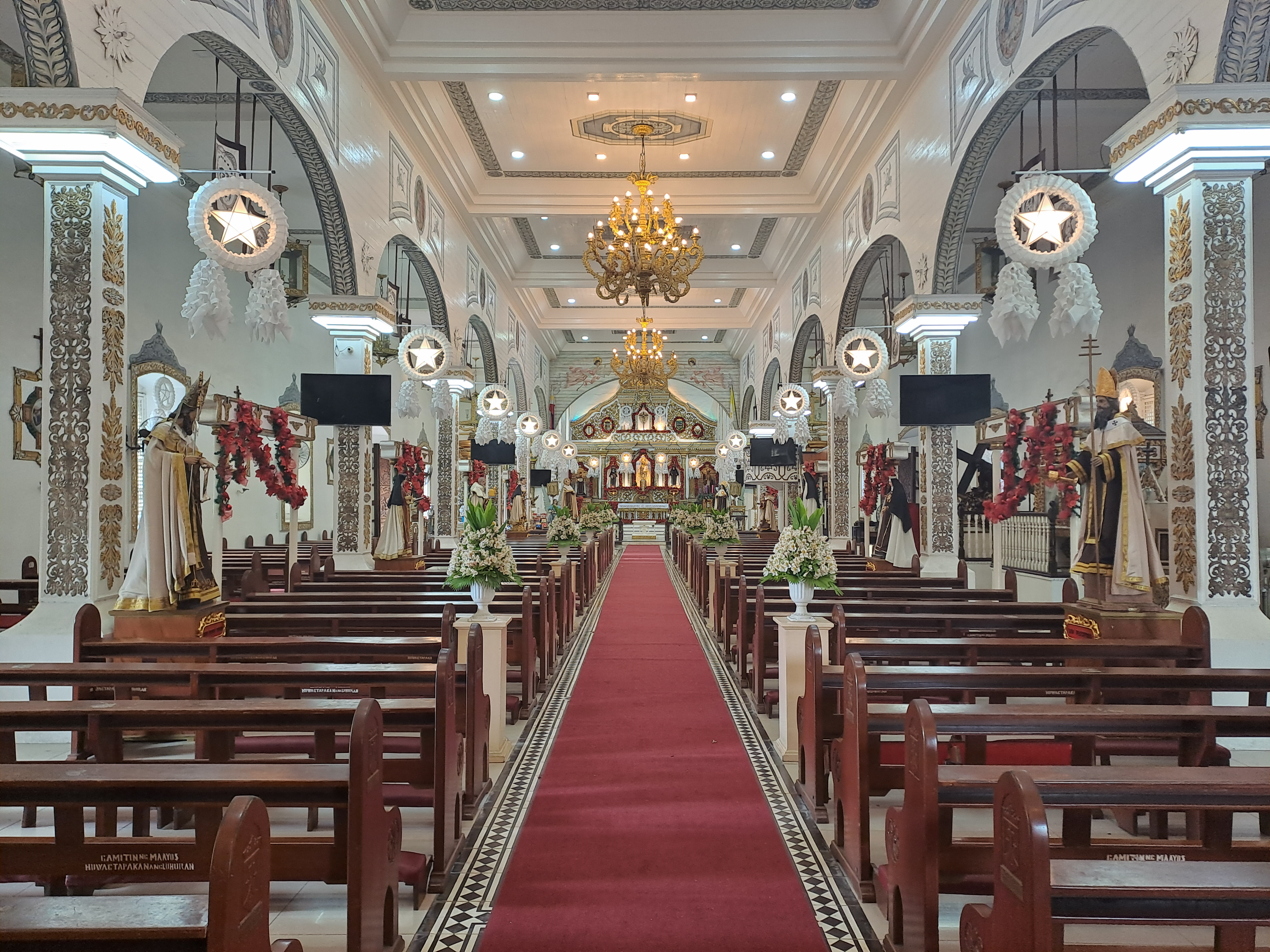
Church nave with parols hung, Christmas 2023

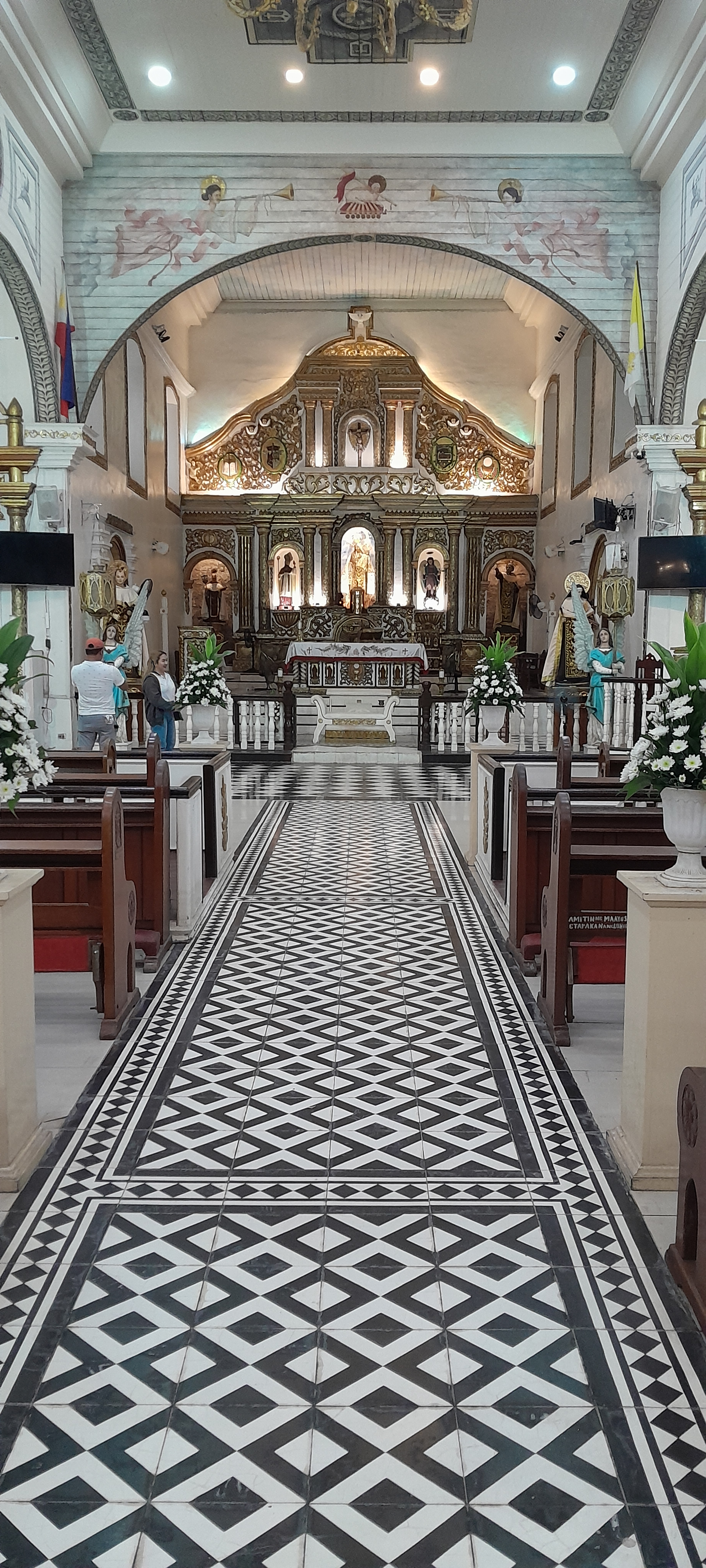
The church's nave tiles.

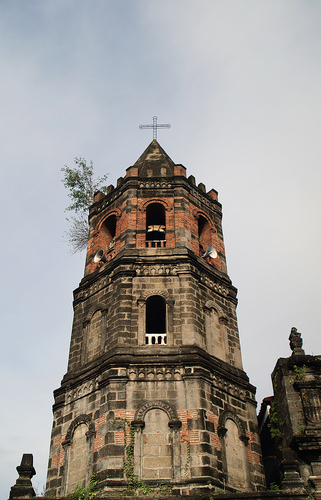
Church bell tower

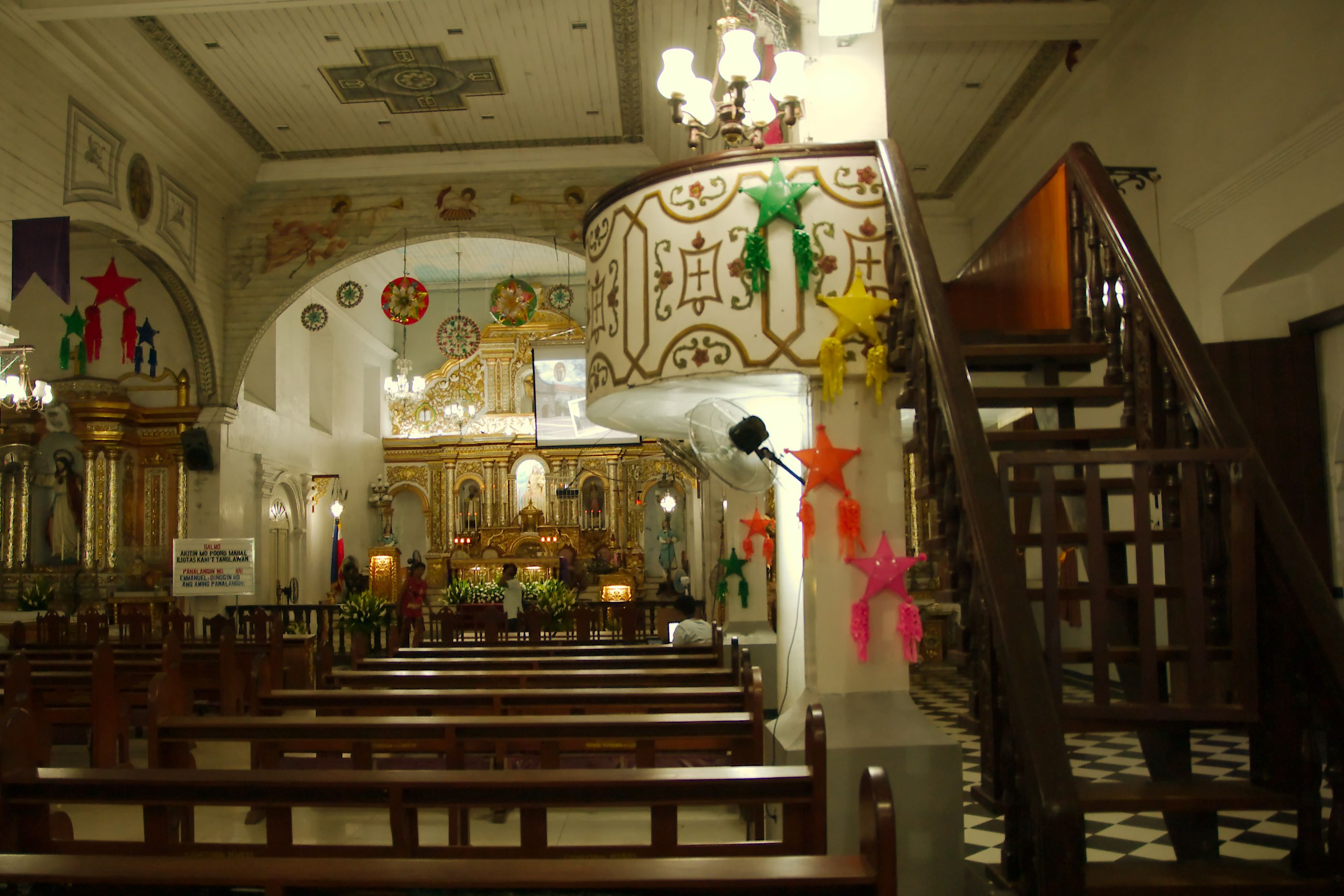
Church altar

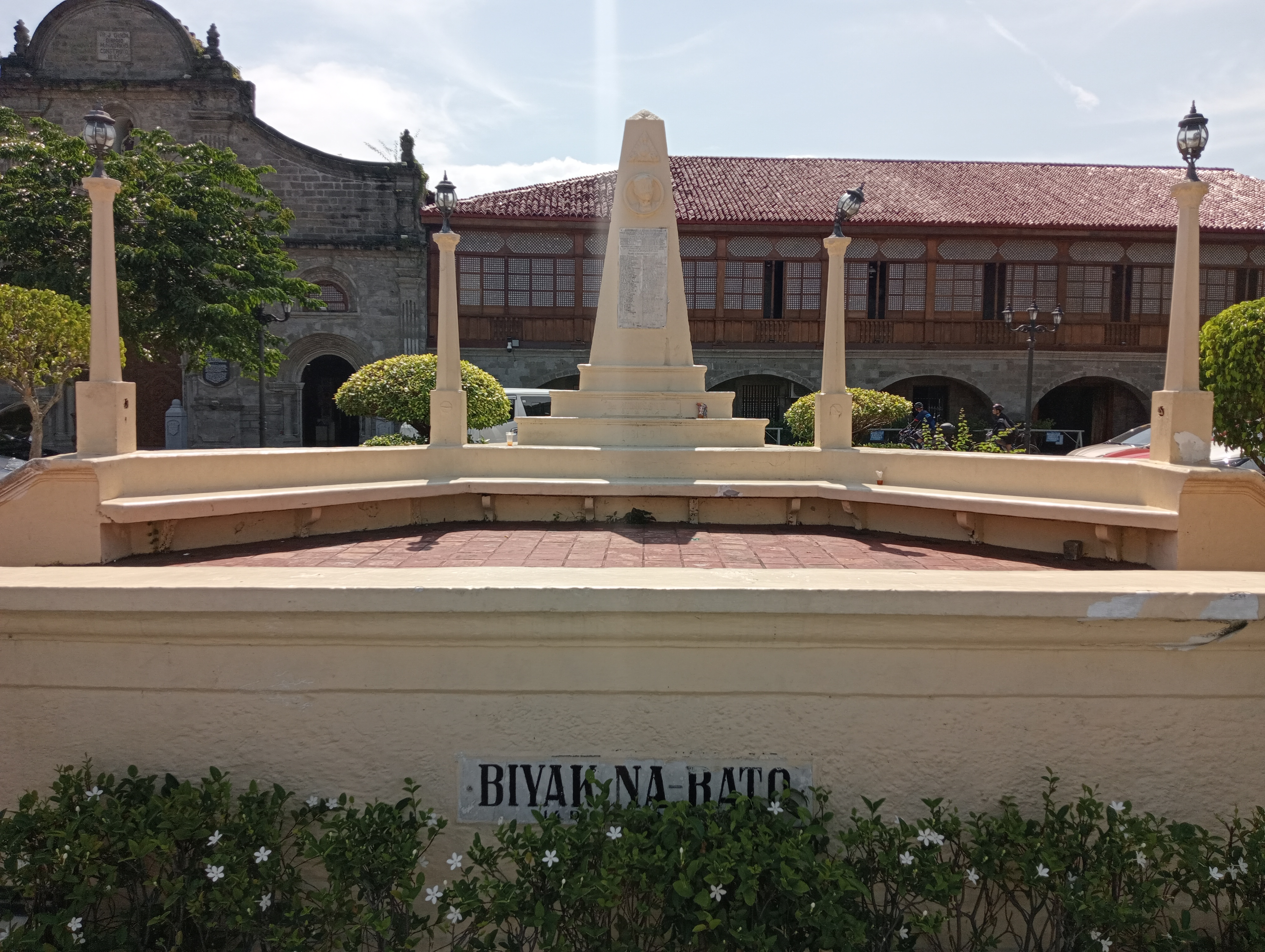
Biyak na Bato
