= Alicia Pérez-Porro =

Spanish marine biologist

- Born: 1981 (age 44–45)
- Education: University of Barcelona, Autonomous University of Barcelona, Harvard University, University of Costa Rica
- Occupations: Marine biologist, Environmentalist
- Awards: Gold Medal of the Red Cross and the Spanish Red Crescent

Alicia R. Pérez-Porro (Barcelona, 1981) is a Spanish marine biologist specialized in the study of marine sponges, an environmental activist and a feminist. Since 2018, she has presided over the Association of Spanish Scientists in the United States (ECUSA), from where she fights to break the glass ceiling in the scientific field and for women to occupy leadership positions.

== Career ==
With a PhD in Biology from the University of Barcelona (UB), Pérez-Porro carried out her thesis on ecology and genomics of marine sponges at the Center for Advanced Studies in Blanes and at Harvard University. In addition, she completed a Master in Biodiversity at the Autonomous University of Barcelona (UAB). In 2004, Pérez-Porro received a scholarship to study at the Internal Center for Research in Marine Sciences and Limnology of the University of Costa Rica in what has become his main research topic: marine sponges. Pérez-Porro focuses her research on the effects of climate change on marine sponges of coral reefs, and its adaptation to a changing ocean. In addition, Pérez-Porro is very involved in the fight against the presence of plastic waste in the sea, and in 2018 she published several articles of dissemination in the digital newspaper El Independiente. She works as an adjunct professor of Environmental Sciences at Baruch College in New York. In addition, she is a research associate at the National Museum of Natural History of the United States administered by the Smithsonian Institution in Washington D.C.

In 2017, she was selected along with three other Spanish scientists to participate in the second expedition to Antarctica organized by Homeward Bound. One thousand women participated in this leadership and empowerment program for women in science and technology to fight against climate change. She is also on the leadership team of the 500 Women Scientists initiative.

Pérez-Porro is president of the Network of Associations of Spanish Researchers and Scientists Abroad (RAICEX) and, since March 2019, she is also the president of the Association of Spanish Scientists in the United States (ECUSA). It was the founder of the Women in Science Commission (MECUSA) within the ECUSA society to direct the promotion and visibility of the role of women in the scientific field.

== Awards ==
For her participation in the Homeward Bound, Pérez-Porro received in 2018, along with the other three members of the team (Ana Payo Payo, Uxua López, and Alexandra Dubini), the Gold Medal of the Red Cross and the Spanish Red Crescent. That same year, she became a Women inPower Fellow, awarded to women leaders. In 2019, she was selected for the Aspen Ideas Festival Scholar.

== Selected publications ==
- Prashant P. Sharma, Stefan T. Kaluziak, Alicia R. Pérez-Porro, Vanessa L. González, Gustavo Hormiga, Ward C. Wheeler, Gonzalo Giribet. 2014. Phylogenomic interrogation of Arachnida reveals systemic conflicts in phylogenetic signal. Molecular Biology and Evolution, Volume 31, Issue 11. doi.org/10.1093/molbev/msu235.
- Ana Riesgo, Sónia C.S. Andrade, Prashant P. Sharma, Marta Novo, Alicia R. Pérez-Porro, Varpu Vahtera, Vanessa L. González, Gisele Y. Kawauchi, Gonzalo Giribet. 2012. Comparative description of ten transcriptomes of newly sequenced invertebrates and efficiency estimation of genomic sampling in non-model taxa. Frontiers in Zoology, Volume 9, Article number: 33. doi.org/10.1186/1742-9994-9-33.
- Rosa Fernández, Christopher E. Laumer, Varpu Vahtera, Silvia Libro, Stefan Kaluziak, Prashant P. Sharma, Alicia R. Pérez-Porro, Gregory D. Edgecombe, Gonzalo Giribet. Evaluating Topological Conflict in Centipede Phylogeny Using Transcriptomic Data Sets. Molecular Biology and Evolution, Volume 31, Issue 6. doi.org/10.1093/molbev/msu108.
- Ana Riesgo, Alicia R. Pérez-Porro, Susana Carmona, Sally P. Leys, Gonzalo Giribet. 2012. Optimization of preservation and storage time of sponge tissues to obtain quality mRNA for next-generation sequencing. Molecular Ecology Resources, Volume 12, Issue 2. doi.org/10.1111/j.1755-0998.2011.03097.x.
