= Ascensión Nicol y Goñi =

Blessed Ascensión Nicol y Goñi OP
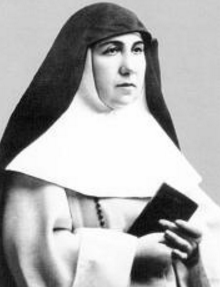

Virgin
- Born: March 14, 1868; Tafalla, Navarre, Spain
- Died: February 24, 1940 (aged 71); Pamplona, Navarre, Spain
- Venerated in: Roman Catholic Church
- Beatified: May 14, 2005, St. Peter's Basilica, Vatican City, by Pope Benedict XVI
- Major shrine: Dominican Motherhouse, Pamplona, Navarre, Spain

María Ascensión Nicol y Goñi, OP, (14 March 1868 – 24 February 1940) was a Spanish religious sister of the Third Order of St. Dominic. She co-founded the Congregation of Dominican Missionary Sisters of the Rosary, which she helped to found in Peru, and was the congregation's first prioress.

== Life ==
=== Background ===
Florentina Nicol y Goñi was born on 14 March 1868 in Tafalla, Navarre, the youngest of the four daughters of Juan Nicol y Zalduendo, a shopkeeper specializing in farming items, and of Águeda Goñi y Vidal, who died in 1872. As a child, she had many duties, including helping her family with the household chores. In 1878 a cousin of her father, who was a Discalced Carmelite, offered to educate the middle two daughters at the boarding school of her convent, the oldest having already married. Agreeing, he sent the girls to study. They later entered the Carmelite convent themselves.

In December 1881 Nicol was enrolled by her father at the boarding school of the Beaterio (Convent) of Santa Rosa in Huesca, a religious community of contemplative sisters of the Third Order of Saint Dominic, which was considered a prestigious school in the region. It was there that she was able to experience for herself the consecrated life, which raised questions in her mind about her future. Her father and stepmother withdrew her from the school in February 1883, considering that she had received sufficient education for a female. During that time, however, she had felt called to join the Dominican Sisters who had taught her, but she returned home to reflect on her choices.

By the following October Nicol had received the permission of her father to enter the convent. He then took her back to Huesca, where they visited her two sisters who were Carmelites, after which she entered the novitiate of the beaterio. In 1886 she made her first religious vows, taking the religious name Mary Ascension of the Sacred Heart. She then became a teacher at that school and served in that capacity for the next 27 years. Under the anti-clerical laws promulgated in the early 20th century, however, the Spanish government took over the school and expelled the Sisters in 1913.

Deprived of their traditional ministry, the sisters decided to act on a proposal they had long considered, namely, missionary service, about which they had learned from the periodicals issued by various missionary congregations. They wrote to ecclesiastical authorities in both America and the Philippines, seeking a field where they could help the poorest of the poor. The response came from the friar Ramón Zubieta, a former missionary in the Philippines who had just been appointed by the Holy See as the Apostolic Vicar of a new vicariate in the Peruvian amazons. The friar had traveled to Rome for his consecration as a bishop. After his stay in Rome, he stopped in Huesca to speak with the sisters to see if he would be able to get some of the community to help in his new responsibility. Five of the sisters who volunteered for this mission were chosen, and Nicol was chosen to lead them.

=== New horizons ===
The five Dominican sisters left Huesca during November 1913, accompanied by the bishop and three other friars who were to serve his territory, landing in Peru at the Port of Callao on 30 December 1913. When they arrived in Lima, they were given hospitality by the Dominican sisters of the convent at the Shrine of Our Lady of the Patronage, of which they took possession the following year. After a two-year period of cultural acclimation and preparation for the mission, Nicol set off in 1915 with two other Sisters for their final destination in the mountain forests. After a journey of 24 days crossing the Andes to a region where white women had never before traveled, they arrived in Puerto Maldonado, a small village in the Amazon basin, situated between two large rivers, the Madre de Dios River and the Tambopata River, along which all communication took place.

Within three days of their arrival, the sisters began teaching the girls of the region and started the construction of a school. Soon girls from the indigenous Baraya tribe starting coming from the forest to receive the education they offered. Nicol made it clear that they would be welcome in their classrooms. This was despite the hostility of the white plantation workers who formed the population of the town. The lack of any organized health care led the poor and the sick to come to the Sisters for care. The sisters responded to this need, caring for them in their own convent, when necessary. They began to visit the sick in their homes, and provide whatever rudimentary care they could. Eventually, the sisters would expand into medical care as a new apostolate. This pattern was repeated as other communities of Sisters were established in the region.

=== Founder ===
In 1917 the Catholic Church established a new Code of Canon Law, which was the first organized juridical codification of the regulations for many aspects of the church's life and functioning. One of the effects was reinforcing the separation of cloistered communities. These new regulations would have severely hampered the work the nuns and religious sisters were undertaking. At the recommendation of the Master of the Order of Preachers, Ludwig Theissling, who was visiting Peru, the sisters, under the auspices of Bishop Zubieta, decided to separate from the monastic community from which they had come and to form a new and independent congregation of Religious Sisters of the Dominican Third Order Regular.

The new congregation was formally established on 5 October 1918 at the Convent of Our Lady of the Patronage in Lima. Nicol was elected as the first prioress of the congregation, and served in that office the rest of her life. She also served as the Mistress of novices, training the candidates to the congregation at their novitiate in Spain. During her generalship, she led her sisters to establish themselves in other countries. In 1932 Nicol led the founding community to mainland China, establishing what is to be the nucleus of their presence in Asia. She also established her congregation in Spain where they were able to recruit and form many missionary vocations. The motherhouse of the congregation was established in Pamplona, Navarre, Spain, and became her base.

By 1938 Nicol increasingly frail and wanted to retire to prepare herself for her final days. Nevertheless, she accepted her unanimous re-election for a third term as Prioress General at the congregation's General Chapter of 1939. She died on 24 February 1940.

== Legacy ==
Today the congregation has 785 Sisters serving in 21 nations on five continents. Its General Motherhouse is now in Madrid. Among its members, the congregation counts four Sisters who are considered to be martyrs for the faith, having been tortured and murdered in the former Republic of the Congo on 25 November 1964, in the course of the Simba Rebellion, after they refused to leave the patients in their hospital.

== Veneration ==
The beatification process of Nicol was opened in Pamplona in September 1962. Pope John Paul II declared her venerabkle in 2003. The following year a miracle was declared to have taken place through her intercession, due to which Pope Benedict XVI authorized the process to proceed. Thus, on 15 May 2005, in St. Peter's Square, Nicol was beatified in a ceremony presided over by Cardinal José Saraiva Martins. Nicol was beatified along with another missionary religious sister, Marianne Cope, who worked among the lepers of Molokai, Hawaii.
