= UxuA RNA motif =

uxuA
- Consensus secondary structure and sequence conservation of uxuA RNA

Identifiers
- Symbol: uxuA
- Rfam: RF03061

Other data
- RNA type: Gene; sRNA
- SO: SO:0001263
- PDB structures: PDBe

The uxuA RNA motif is a conserved RNA structure that was discovered by bioinformatics. uxuA motif RNAs are found in the bacterial genus Vibrio.

uxuA RNAs occur upstream of genes that encode mannonate dehydratase, which functions as part of the catabolism of glucuronate. This gene association could suggest that uxuA RNAs operate as cis-regulatory elements to control expression of the mannonate dehydratase genes. However, since the RNAs are found in relatively closely related organisms, it is possible that the apparent gene association arose by chance. Therefore, uxuA RNAs might also function in trans as small RNAs.
