= José Julián de Aranguren =

Spanish Augustinian missionary and archbishop (1801–1861)

José Julián de Aranguren OAR
- Archbishop of Manila
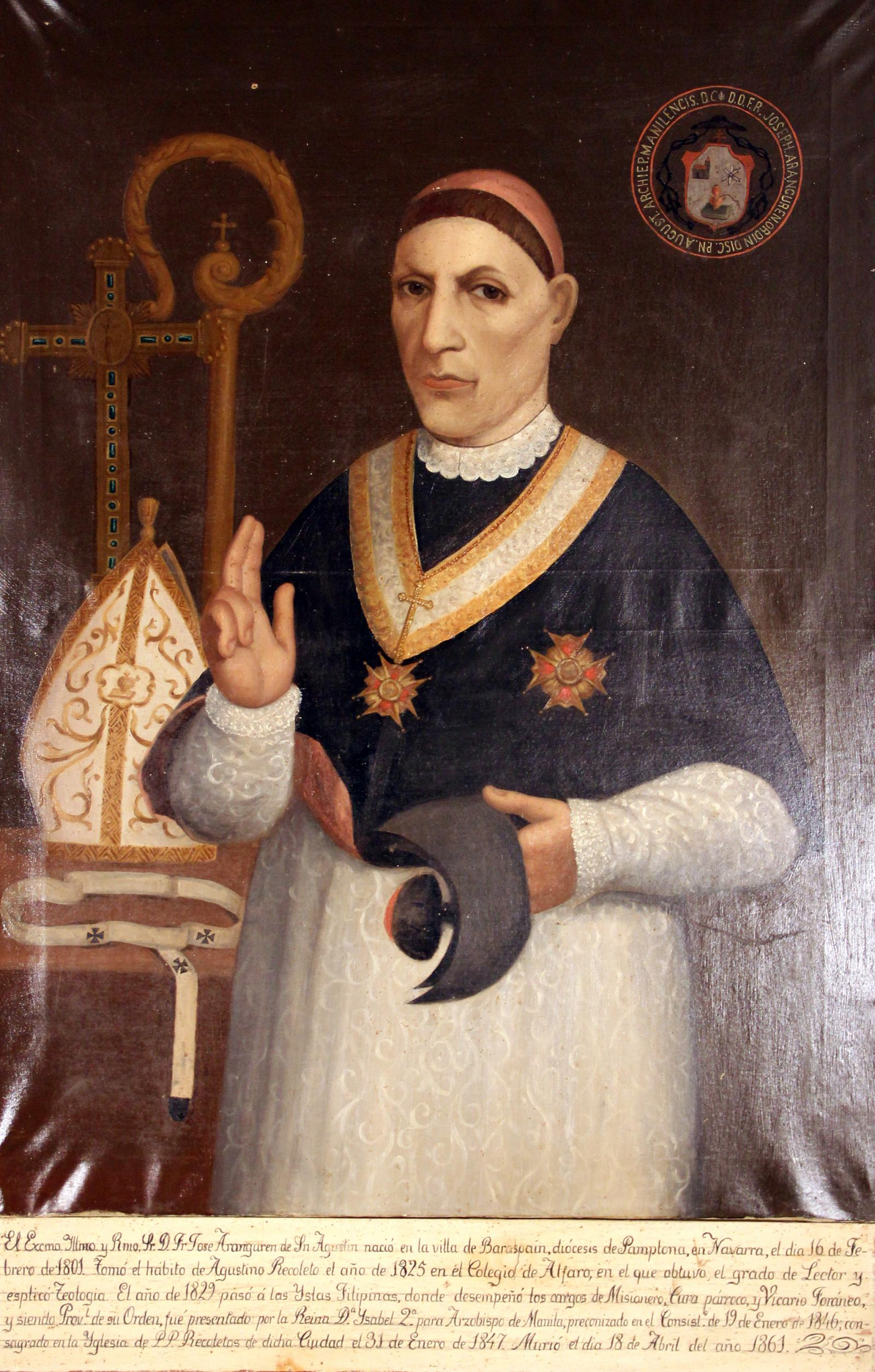
- Church: Catholic Church
- Archdiocese: Archdiocese of Manila
- In office: 19 January 1846 – 18 April 1861
- Predecessor: José Maria Seguí Molas
- Successor: Gregorio Melitón Martínez Santa Cruz

Orders
- Consecration: 31 January 1847 by Romualdo Jimeno Ballesteros

Personal details
- Born: 16 February 1801 Barásoain, Kingdom of Navarre
- Died: 18 April 1861 (aged 60)

José Julián de Aranguren (16 February 1801 – 18 April 1861) was a Basque-born Spanish Augustinian Recollect missionary sent to the Philippines in 1829. An exemplary and much-beloved Christian leader, he later served as the 22nd Archbishop of Manila from 19 January 1847 to 18 April 1861. His 14-year episcopate left a profound and lasting impact on the religious, social, and financial landscape of the Philippines, as well as Spain.

== Biography ==
As Pope Leo XIV was to the papacy, José Julián Aranguren was to the archdiocese of Manila. Like the Pope, he was also the first and only Augustinian Recollect to be appointed as Archbishop of Manila.

Known for his work ethic, humility, and frugality, Aranguren was involved in building relationships with the Filipino community he served. He was noted for his religious devotion, prudence, diplomacy, and dedication to evangelisation. Several historic places in the Philippines, including churches and towns, were later named after him and his Spanish hometown.

The Barasoain Church in Malolos, Bulacan (founded August 31, 1859) was named in honour of Aranguren's hometown. He famously commissioned the construction of this iconic church, which is now celebrated as a national monument. It is regarded as the "Cradle of Philippine Democracy" because it was here that the convening of the first Philippine Congress and the inauguration of the first Philippine Republic in 1899 was held. Emilio Aguinaldo served as the new republic's inaugural president here. Hence, this church permanently linked Aranguren's missionary life in Asia back to his roots in Navarre.

The Aranguren Village (Barangay Aranguren), likewise, located in Capas, Tarlac, was named in his honour. His hard work and excellent administration left a lasting impression on the region, so, they immortalised him with this village. In the year 2021, Aranguren Village was incorporated into the New Clark City.

Aranguren's parents were Bernardo Aranguren of Zizur Mayor and Nicolasa Leoz of Sada. They were married in San Nicolas, Pamplona on March 26, 1800. He was their firstborn. His siblings were Maria Jesus Aranguren Huarte Mendicoa (b. 1803), Angel Maria Aranguren Leoz (b. 1806), and Juaquina Rodriguez Hurtado (b. 1815).

Aranguren was baptised on February 17, 1801, the day after he was born. This was in accordance with the widespread Basque custom to baptize babies the very next day after they were born, and often even on the exact same day.

Aranguren's sole godparent was his maternal grandfather, Jose Leoz, an organist of the Parish of Santa Maria de la Asuncion of Barasoain. This church features two grand flanking entrance towers, a southern Romanesque-era Chrismon, and a 17th-century Romanist altarpiece.

Aranguren was then confirmed on October 18, 1801, by Bishop Lorenzo Igual de Soria, the bishop of Pamplona.

In 1818, Aranguren left the Valle de Orba and began his studies at the University of Zaragoza. He was 17 years old. He studied philosophy (Logic, Metaphysics, and Ethics) and science (Physics, Chemistry, and Mathematics). At the same university, he studied Civil Law from 1822 to 1824 with the intent of becoming a lawyer.

During this time, the Liberal Triennium of Spain (1820–1823) was underway. The Triennium was a 3-year period when the liberalist rebel Captain-General Rafael del Riego ruled Spain. King Ferdinand VII was forced to step back, and accept the Liberal constitution of 1812. He was imprisoned throughout this period. This did not sit well with the Quintuple Alliance of Britain, France, Russia, Prussia, and Austria. They gave France a mandate to intervene and place King Ferdinand VII back to his throne.

So, in 1823, a French Army known as the "Hundred Thousand Sons of Saint Louis" invaded Spain and successfully restored King Ferdinand VII to the throne. Thereafter, two conflicting factions arose: the Conservatives (known as Royalists or Absolutists) and the Liberals. Most of the Basque population heavily favoured the Conservatives because the Liberals threatened to abolish ancient local laws, customs, and charters of the Basque people and other "fueros", whereas King Ferdinand VII was willing to preserve them.

The end of the Triennium triggered ten full years of brutal political repression and executions in Spain. It was called the "Ominous Decade" (1824–1834). Aranguren decided to enlist in the Spanish Army in 1824. He served as a cavalryman (soldier on horseback). He probably wanted to ensure that King Ferdinand VII remained on his throne and was safe from harm. After a year in service in the Spanish Army, he left. In December 1825, he permanently traded his military uniform for the religious garments of the Augustinian Recollects at the College of Alfaro. He began his religious profession on December 8 of the following year.

Once he obtained his diploma as Professor of Sacred Theology, he took on the task of discipling and forming young aspirants to the religious life. This work had to be interrupted in April 1829 when he was sent on a mission to the Philippines. He led a group of Spanish missionaries aboard the ship, 'Preciosa', which left the port of Santander on May 30, 1829.

Upon his arrival in Manila on October 2, 1829, Aranguren began teaching Theology classes in the Recollect Convent of San Nicolas Friary in Intramuros. The 19th-century Philippines he came to was marked by a growing tension between long-standing missionary institutions and the demands of an increasingly modern world. Within this setting, he who began as a humble missionary in the plains of Zambales and Tarlac rose to become the 22nd Archbishop of Manila.

Aranguren wanted to work more closely with the people so, in May 1831, he left the cathedral to stay with the parishioners of Taguig, Rizal to learn the national language - Tagalog. Within three months of practice, he gained enough skill in the language to begin his missionary duties. On August 10, 1831, he went to serve in Capas and Patling, Tarlac.

After a 50-year hiatus of the Recollect ministry in Zambales, Aranguren arrived and became the parish priest of Masinloc on April 13, 1836. He found the Recollect Mission properties in a deplorable state. He began restoring the abandoned buildings and within seven years, his restoration work was completed.

In 1837, he concurrently became the parish priest of Baclayon, Bohol. He beautified the La Purisima Concepcion de la Virgen Maria Parish Church of this town, a church made of coral stones founded by the Jesuits in 1596 but heavily renovated by the Augustinians in the 1800s.

Aranguren was elected Secretary Provincial of the Recollect Friars in Masinloc in 1834, Vicar of Zambales in 1837, as well as Foreign Vicar of the Clergy in Manila, and in 1843, he was elected as the Prior Provincial of the Augustinian Recollects. However, he had to resign from this last position. On November 13, 1845, Isabella II, the Queen of Spain, nominated him to the post of Archbishop of Manila. In a secret consistory dated January 9, 1846, Pope Pius IX signed his appointment.

Aranguren's merits earned him the appointment of "Adviser to Her Majesty, Queen Isabella II of Spain". Consequently, the Queen knighted him conferring him the "Grand Cross of the Order of Isabel la Catolica". Queen Isabella further offered him the position of "Senator for Life" in the Spanish government but he respectfully declined.

There was a recurring claim that Aranguren's biological father was the then 17-year-old Crown Prince Ferdinand VII of Spain, the father of Queen Isabella II, but this has not been officially substantiated yet. Incidentally, King Charles IV of Spain and Maria Luisa of Parma had fourteen children, and Prince Ferdinand VII was their eldest surviving son. If the claim is verified, Aranguren would have been a half-brother of Queen Isabella II and the Infanta Luisa Fernanda.

In October 1802, one year after Aranguren's birth, Prince Ferdinand VII, aged 18, married his first cousin Maria Antonieta of Naples and Sicily. They were married in Barcelona, Spain. Their union was politically driven and famously unhappy. She died of tuberculosis at the age of 21 without producing an heir.

Then, in 1816, Ferdinand VII, now king, remarried, this time to Maria Isabel of Braganza, his maternal niece. She managed to give birth to a daughter, Maria Luisa Isabel, but the baby died at 4 months old. The queen became pregnant again, but the baby was in breech. After a horrific, botched delivery of a stillborn child, the Queen tragically died on December 26, 1818, at the age of 21.

In 1819, the king, now 35, took another wife, his second maternal niece, Maria Josepha Amalia of Saxony, Germany. She was 16. She was the youngest child of Prince Maximilian of Saxony and Princess Carolina of Parma. Ferdinand and Maria's tumultuous relationship included a delayed consummation and resulted in no children before her death at age 25 due to a fever.

Finally, King Ferdinand VII married a third niece, Maria Christina of the Two Sicilies, in 1829. The union produced two daughters, Maria Isabel and Maria Luisa Fernanda. Before Maria Isabel was born, the king had invoked the abrogation of the Salic Law. Because of this, she was able to precede his father upon his death.

The episcopal consecration for Archbishop José Aranguren was executed at the Augustinian Recollects Church in Intramuros on January 31, 1847. His principal consecrator was the Bishop of Cebu, Romualdo Jimeno Ballesteros of the Dominican Order. His episcopal lineage can be traced back to Cardinal Scipione Rebiba, Titular Patriarch of Constantinople, consecrated on December 8, 1565.

During his challenging 14 years of tenure, Aranguren, in addition to regularly visiting his mission stations and large parishes, stood out for the practice of ministry for the poor and the infirm, interest in church beautification, evangelization of infidels, simplification of the archdiocesan administration, interest in missions in China, and zeal in pastoral visits. He conducted two full pastoral visitations across Luzon, personally travelling by both land and sea to reach isolated missions that had not seen a priest in over 50 years.

To help stabilise and modernise the country's economy, Aranguren, along with businessmen including Antonio de Ayala, founded the bank, "El Banco Español Filipino de Isabel II" (now Bank of the Philippine Islands), the very first bank established in the Philippines and in Southeast Asia.

This pioneering bank, which started on August 1, 1851, provided credit to the National Treasury. Under Aranguren's guidance, the bank issued the country's first official currency, the Peso Fuerte, a precursor to the current Philippine Peso. Nowadays, the bank is headquartered in Makati City with over 1,200 branches nationwide. It operates in Hong Kong, Singapore, the UK, the United Arab Emirates, and Japan.

Along with this bank, Aranguren erected a statue for Queen Isabella II of Spain. It is located inside the walls of Intramuros. He also built the Bridge of Queen Isabella II in Imus, Cavite, a formidable lithic arch bridge. In 1856, he led the creation of the province of Isabela in the Philippines. The people initially called it "Isabela de Luzon" and later, simply "Isabela".

Aranguren maintained a closer link with Barasoain, his natal village, throughout his episcopate. He financed the reform of their town parochial church. The work plan would be presented to the Bishop of Pamplona so he could order Mr Angel Aranguren, the Archbishop's brother, to pay them for the work.

Nowadays, the house where Fray José Julián de Aranguren was born is currently occupied by the Parish Priest. It is called the Parish House and is a stone's throw from the town church. It is located at number 1 of the street that bears his name: "Calle Arzobispo Aranguren".

To get a glimpse of the character of Archbishop Aranguren, here is a letter he wrote to the Barasoain town council on July 22, 1847, where he narrated: "As a son of Barasoain I could not help but be extremely pleased by the news of the demonstrations of support and joy with which my compatriots have favoured me, being immensely grateful, and explaining that, to overcome the weariness he felt in accepting a position of such importance, far beyond my abilities and merits, he relied on the idea that, decorated with such a sublime Dignity, he might perhaps bring some honour to the people among whom I was born and where I spent the years of my innocence, which I never remember without fondness. At that time I couldn't imagine that the "honour" I could bring to the town where I was born would materialise in the image of the temple. I continued recalling the illustrious figure of Don Martín de Azpilcueta, with whom Barasoain already had the glory of having produced one of the distinguished men of the 16th century and now can count among his children an Archbishop, albeit stripped of the wisdom and piety of Doctor Navarro."

Aranguren had been active in the war against Joloano pirates in the Philippines. The Spanish frequently engaged the Joloano pirates in the 1840s, sending out several fleets of warships and Spanish Army troops to the Balanguingui Island in the Sulu archipelago. It was rumored that after several Spanish expeditions to the island and its vicinities, in 1849, no significant Joloano pirate forces remained in the area.

Aranguren invited the Daughters of Charity of Saint Vincent de Paul (Las Hijas de la Caridad) to Manila because he was deeply concerned with the poor healthcare and lack of schools and social welfare in the Philippines. He arranged for the Sisters of Charity to establish a mission in Manila.

Though the Sisters officially arrived shortly after his death, his paperwork and planning laid the groundwork for their extensive network of hospitals and schools. Sixteen sisters, two Vincentian priests, two Vincentian coadjutor brothers, seven Jesuits, and thirteen Recollect Friars travelled aboard the Spanish merchant frigate "Concepcion", leaving Spain on April 5, 1862, and arriving Manila on July 22, 1862.

The group was grandly welcomed upon arrival. They were accompanied by civil and church dignitaries to the Santa Isabel College chapel for a Thanksgiving Mass. The Sisters took over the administration of San Juan de Dios Hospital, Colegio de Santa Isabel, and the Hospicio de San Jose. In 1868, they established the Universidad de Santa Isabel in Naga City.

Among his works, Aranguren was credited with championing the native clergy by defending local priests. Unlike many Spanish friars of his era who looked down on local priests, Aranguren was a staunch defender of the native secular clergy. He protected their rights, institutional interests, and parishes from being absorbed by Spanish religious orders.

Aranguren personally fostered the careers of brilliant native Filipino priests, most notably, Fr. Pedro Pelaez (his secretary). Pelaez later became the "Father of Secularisation" and mentored Fr. José Burgos, a key inspiration for the Philippine revolution.

On April 18, 1861, Aranguren died of chronic dysentery in Manila. He was 60 years old. His mortal remains were placed at the right side of the main altar of the Manila Cathedral, the Minor Basilica and Metropolitan Cathedral of the Immaculate Conception.

Although he was buried inside the Manila Cathedral, following his final wishes, his heart was extracted and placed in a marble urn to be placed inside the San Nicolas Church in Intramuros, remaining with his Augustinian Recollect brothers. Now we know where his heart is.
