= Tafalla railway station =

Railway station in Tafalla, Spain

Tafalla
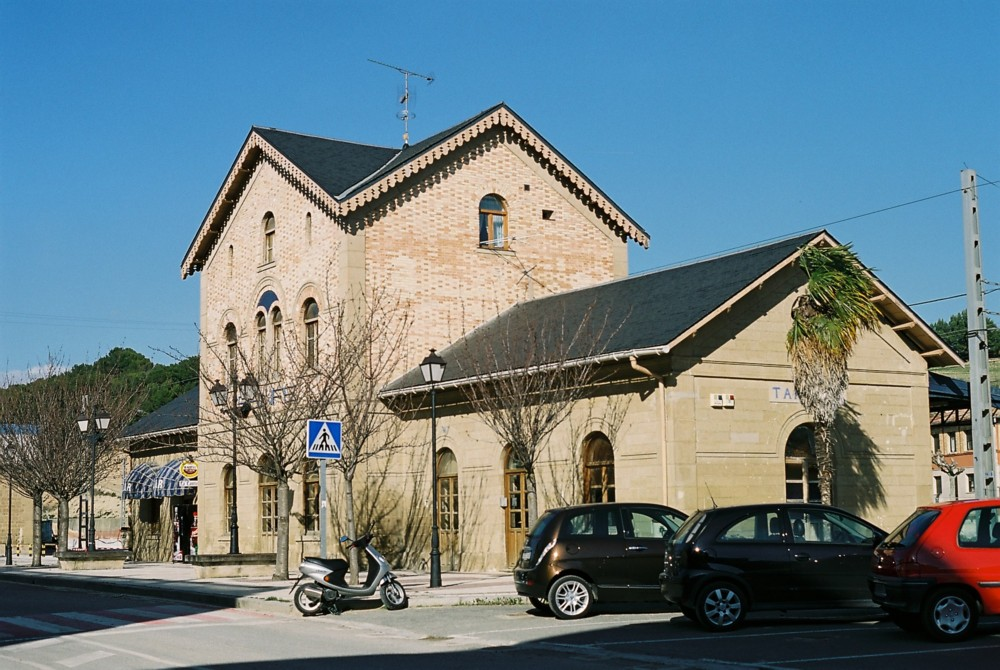
- The train station of Tafalla.

General information
- Location: Tafalla, Navarre; Spain
- Coordinates: 42.5257°N 1.6714°W
- Owner: Adif
- Operator: Renfe
Location

Tafalla railway station is the central railway station of Tafalla in Navarre, Spain. The station has services of long and medium distance operated by Renfe.

== History ==
The station was opened to traffic on 15 September 1860, with the opening of the Caparroso-Pamplona section of the railway line intended to connect Zaragoza with Navarre by the Compañía del Ferrocarril de Zaragoza a Pamplona (Zaragoza-Pamplona Railway Company). This company soon merged with the Compañía del ferrocarril de Zaragoza a Barcelona (Zaragoza-Barcelona Railway Company), forming the Compañía de los Ferrocarriles de Zaragoza a Pamplona y Barcelona (Zaragoza to Pamplona and Barcelona Railway Company). On 1 April 1878, its poor financial situation forced it to accept a merger with the Compañía Norte. In 1941, the nationalization of all Iberian-gauge lines led to the integration of Norte into the newly created Renfe.

Since 31 December 2004, Renfe has operated the line, while ADIF owns the railway facilities.

In 2013, local users began to worry about the possible closure of this station, given that the Zaragoza-Castejón-Pamplona/Logroño high-speed rail project (Navarra High-Speed Train, part of the future expansion of the High-speed rail in Spain) does not include a station in Tafalla. For this reason, they gathered the support of more than 3,000 residents of the Tafalla region through a petition. On 15 September 2013, to mark the 153rd anniversary of the station's inauguration, an event was held at the station to demand its continued operation. Since then, demonstrations have taken place to oppose the TAV (high-speed train), which would disconnect them from Navarre's main railway line.
