= Manuel Turrillas =

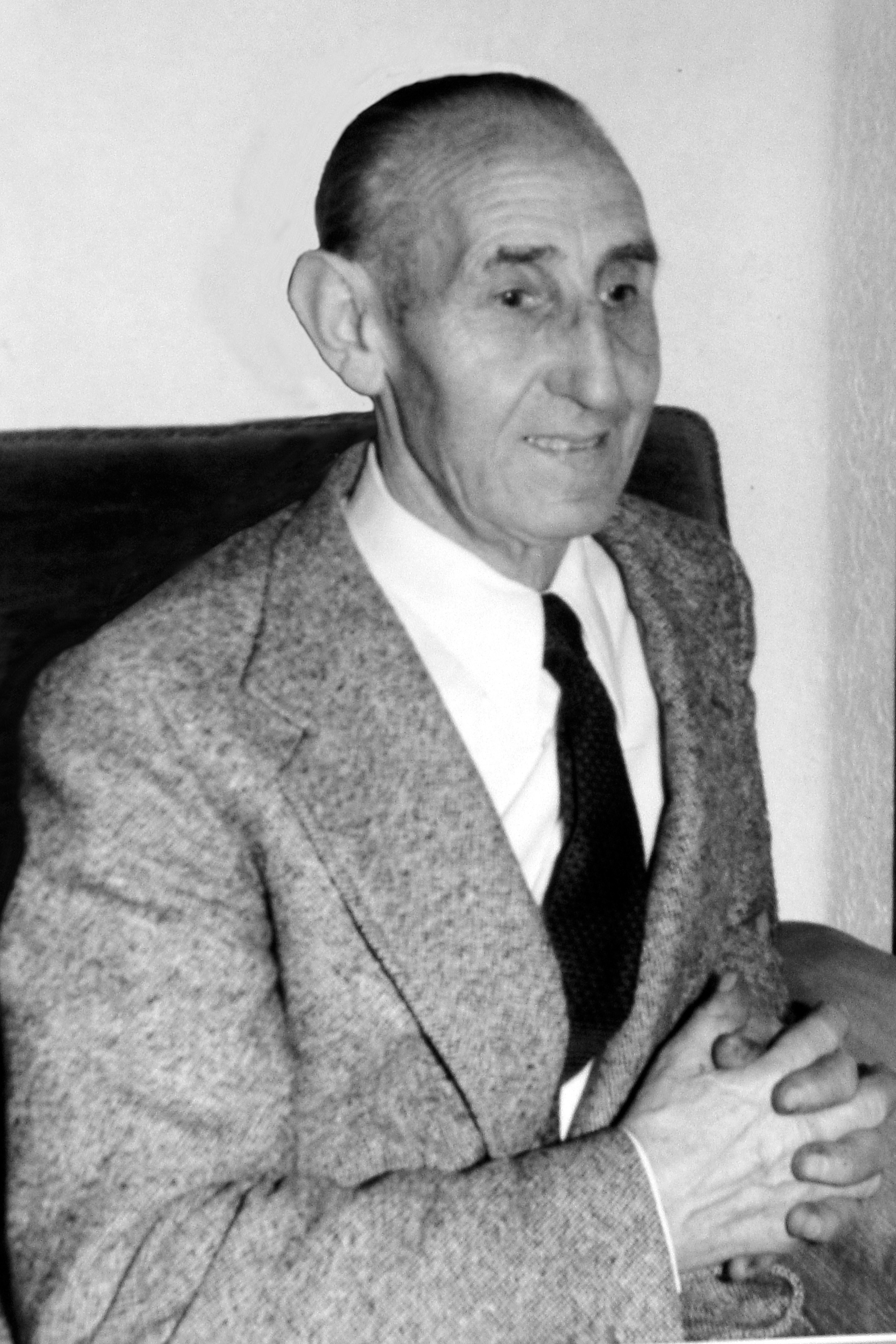

Background information
- Born: January 1, 1905
- Origin: Barásoain
- Died: Died1997|10|20
- Occupation: Musician

Manuel Turrillas Ezcurra (1 January 1905 – 20 October 1997) was one of the most popular composers of Navarre. He was born in Barásoain, where he started in music in the local band, having learned his scales from the church organist. At the age of 20 he moved to Pamplona and immediately joined the band "The Pamplonesa", to which he belonged for 50 years. He was one of the most important figures of the popular music of Navarre.

Known as the "el maestro Turrillas", he composed the most popular hymns of the main Sanfermines Associations , Aldapa, Anaitasuna, La Jarana, Muthiko, Oberena, as well as many others. Manuel Turrillas is also the composer of the popular song that runners sing, newspaper in hand, before the worldwide famous running of the bulls of the festival of San Fermín, a celebration held in the city of Pamplona. Turillas is well known for composing the CA Osasuna football club hymn. The catalog of his work includes more than 400 compositions. The City Council of Pamplona awarded him the Gold Medal of the city.

Manuel Turrillas died, aged 92, in Pamplona, and, after his death, the City dedicated a square to honour him in the local neighbourhood of Azpilagaña.

== Bibliography ==
- Mikel Aramburu et al.: Manuel Turrillas en el centenario de su nacimiento, Pamplona: Ayuntamiento, 2005, ISBN 84-95930-19-6

== Discography ==
- Banda de música "La Pamplonesa": Música de las peñas sanfermineras, Pamplona 2005 (features 12 compositions of Maestro Turrillas)
