= Garínoain =

Human settlement in Spain

Coordinates: 42°36′02″N 1°38′40″W

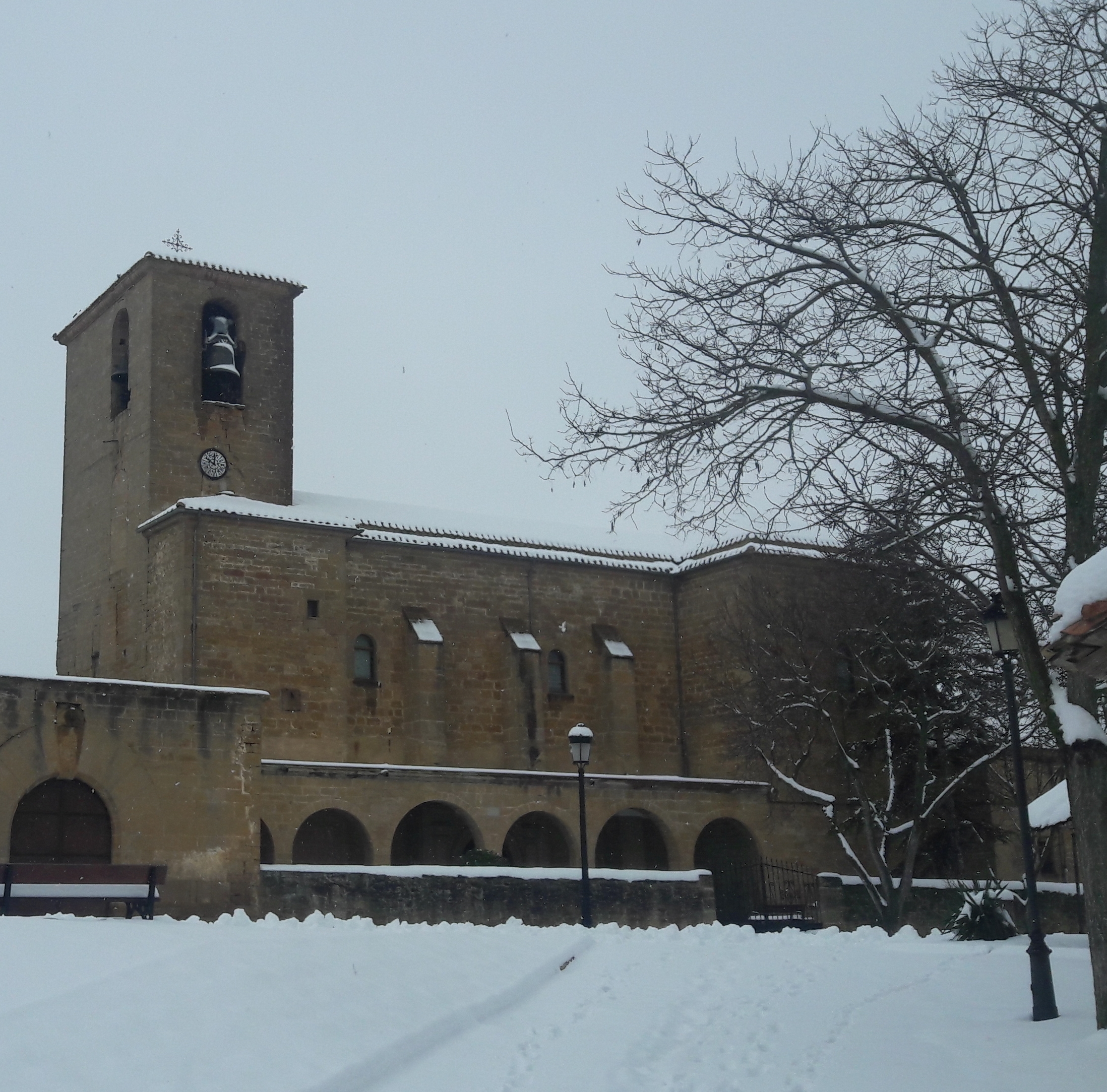
Church of Saint Martin

Garínoain is a town and municipality located in the province and autonomous community of Navarre, northern Spain.
