= Mannonate dehydratase =

mannonate dehydratase

Identifiers
- EC no.: 4.2.1.8
- CAS no.: 9024-31-1

Databases
- IntEnz: IntEnz view
- BRENDA: BRENDA entry
- ExPASy: NiceZyme view
- KEGG: KEGG entry
- MetaCyc: metabolic pathway
- PRIAM: profile
- PDB structures: RCSB PDB PDBe PDBsum
- Gene Ontology: AmiGO / QuickGO
Search
- PMC: articles
- PubMed: articles
- NCBI: proteins

The enzyme mannonate dehydratase (EC 4.2.1.8) catalyzes the chemical reaction

D-mannonate $\rightleftharpoons$ 2-dehydro-3-deoxy-D-gluconate + H_{2}O

This enzyme belongs to the family of lyases, specifically the hydro-lyases, which cleave carbon-oxygen bonds. The systematic name of this enzyme class is D-mannonate hydro-lyase (2-dehydro-3-deoxy-D-gluconate-forming). Other names in common use include mannonic hydrolase, mannonate hydrolyase, altronic hydro-lyase, altronate hydrolase, D-mannonate hydrolyase, and D-mannonate hydro-lyase. This enzyme participates in pentose and glucuronate interconversions.

== Structural studies ==
As of late 2007, only one structure has been solved for this class of enzymes, with the PDB accession code 1TZ9.
