= Olóriz – Oloritz =

Municipality of Spain

Coordinates: 42°38′7″N 1°36′47″W

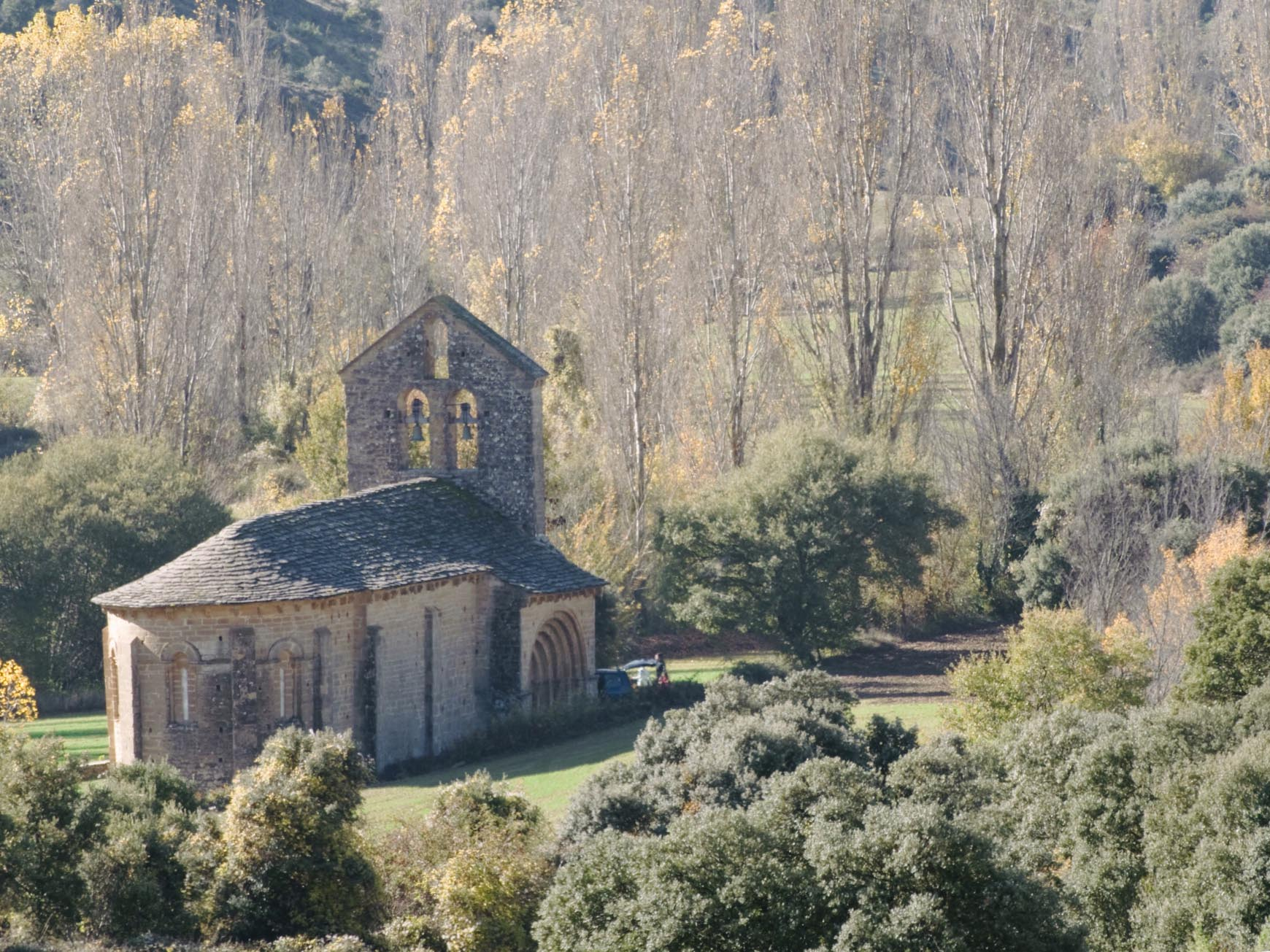
Church of San Pedro de Etxano in Olóriz

Olóriz is a town and municipality located in the province and autonomous community of Navarre, northern Spain.
