= Uxua López =

Spanish researcher, telecommunications engineer, environmental activist

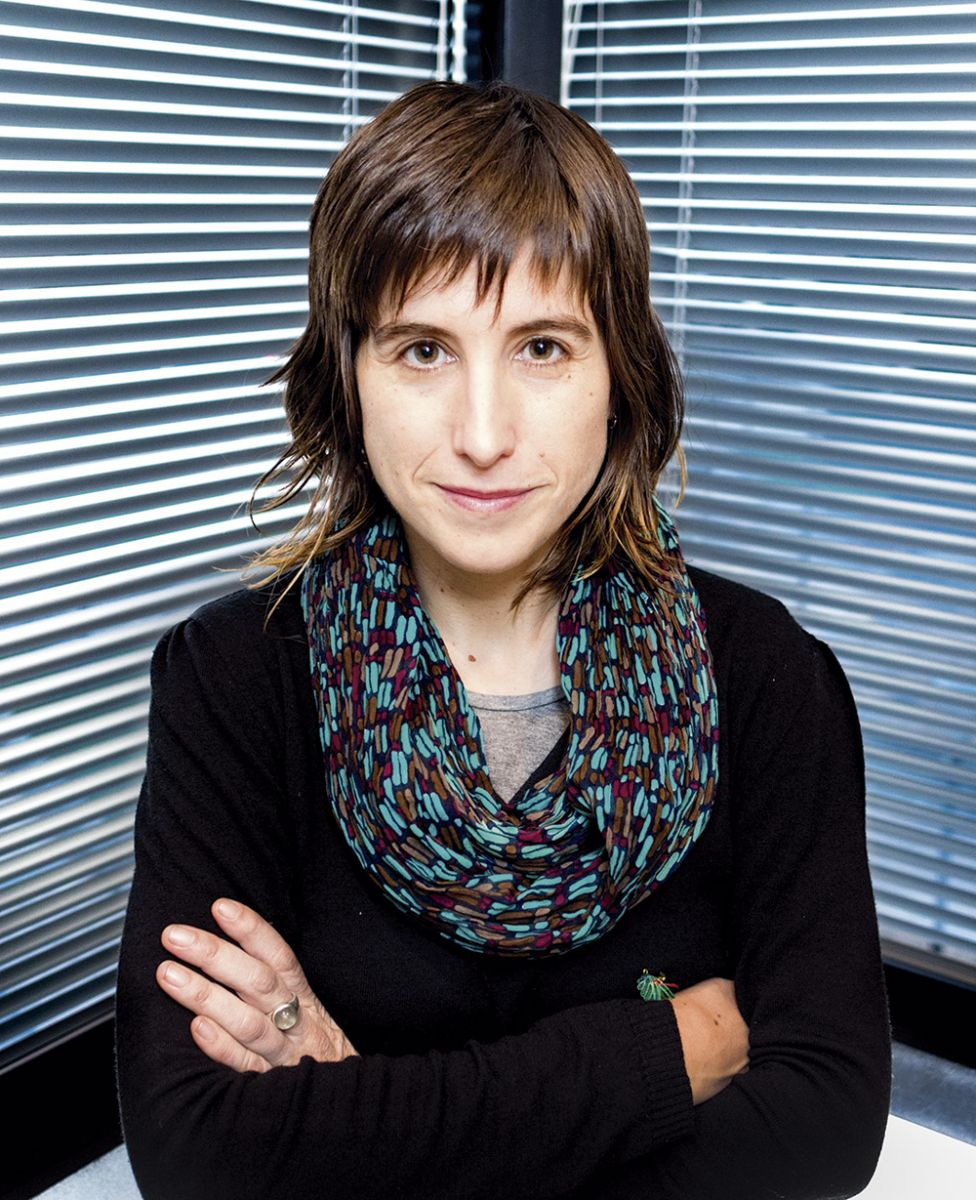
- (2018)
- Born: Uxua López Flamarique; 1983 (age 42–43); Tafalla, Spain
- Education: Public University of Navarre
- Known for: Environmental activist, expert in renewable energy
- Awards: Gold Medal of the Spanish Red Cross; Cross of Carlos III the Noble of Navarra
- Scientific career
- Fields: Telecommunications engineering
- Workplaces: Acciona

Uxua López Flamarique (Tafalla, 1983) is a Spanish telecommunications engineer and environmental activist, expert in renewable energy, and a member of an international network of women leaders aiming to build a global collaboration of 10,000 women with backgrounds in STEMM by 2036, an initiative of Homeward Bound.

== Biography ==
López has a degree in Telecommunications Engineering from the Public University of Navarre (UPNA).

She works for Acciona as a telecommunications engineer, in the center which controls approximately 400 renewable energy stations. Having graduated from a program in cyber security, her specialty is managing industrial control systems.

In 2018, López participated in Homeward Bound's Antarctic expedition, an initiative focused on the leadership and empowerment of women in the scientific field, being one of its first Spanish representatives, along with Ana Payo Payo, Alicia Pérez-Porro, and Alexandra Dubini.

== Awards and honours ==
In 2018, she was awarded the Distinciones de la Cruz Roja Española (Gold Medal of the Spanish Red Cross) for her participation in the Homeward Bound expedition, and with the Cruz de Carlos III el Noble de Navarra (Cross of Carlos III the Noble of Navarra) for her contribution to the promotion and development of solutions to the effects of global warming from scientific research and with a gender perspective.
