= Tafalla =

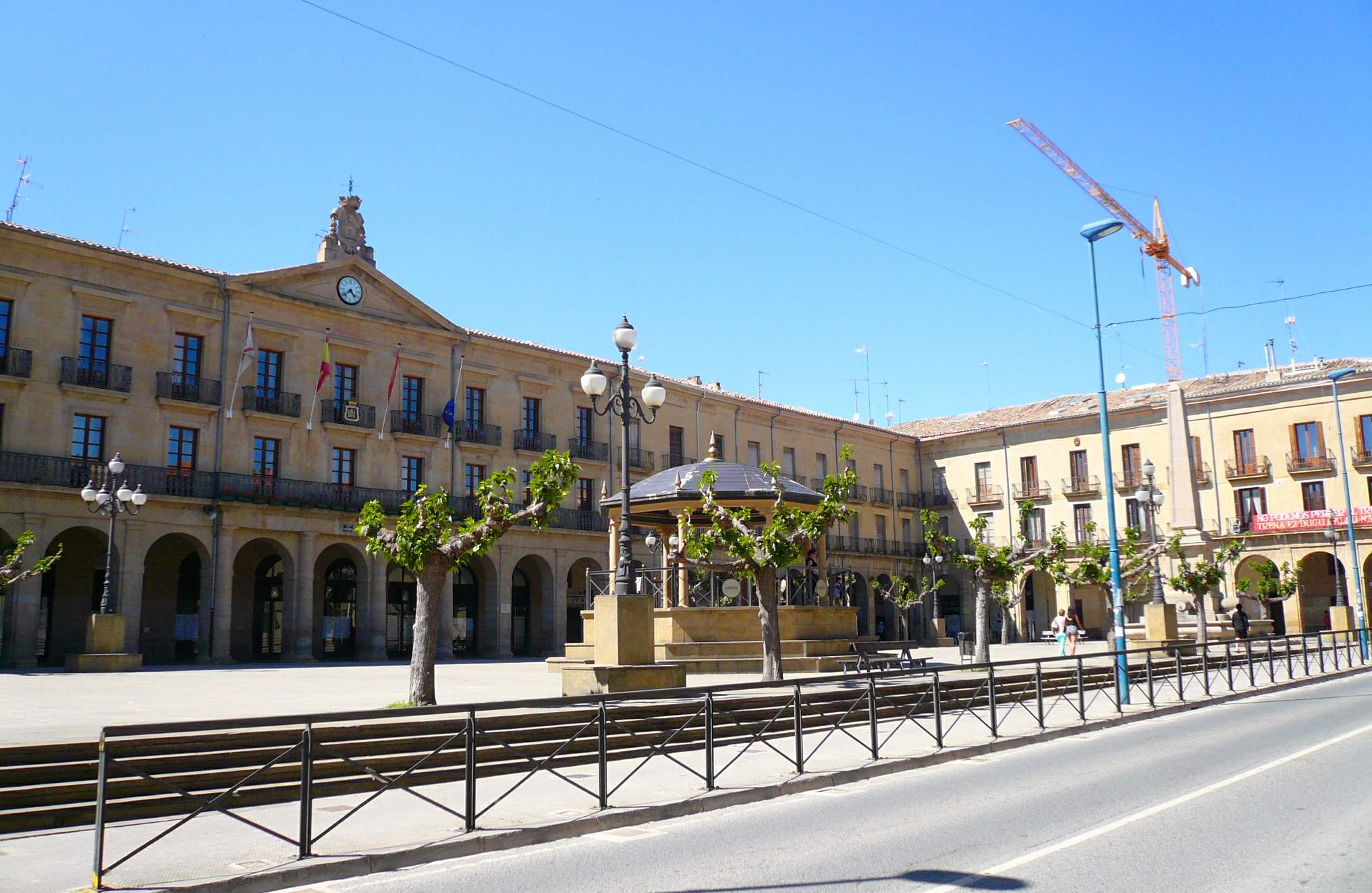
- Plaza de Don Francisco de Navarra

- Flag Coat of arms
- Interactive map of Tafalla
- Coordinates: 42°31′39.8″N 1°40′28.3″W
- Country: Spain
- Autonomous Community: Navarre

Government
  - Mayor: Xavier Alcuaz (EH Bildu)

Area
  - Total: 98.29 km^{2} (37.95 sq mi)
- Elevation: 421 m (1,381 ft)

Population (2025-01-01)
  - Total: 10,854
  - Density: 110.4/km^{2} (286.0/sq mi)
- Time zone: UTC+1 (CET)
  - Summer (DST): UTC+2 (CEST)

Tafalla is a town and municipality located in the province and autonomous community of Navarre, northern Spain. Tafalla lies 30 km south of Pamplona, in the valley of the Zidacos river, which is a tributary of the Aragón. The population in January 2022 was 10,576.

== History ==
=== Prehistoric and Roman eras ===
Traces of human presence in the area date back to the Chalcolithic era, c. 4,500 to 3,700 years ago. There are no remains of permanent settlements before the Iron Age (900-300 BC), but by Roman times, there were 15 settlements in the area. These were concentrated near the Cidacos River in El Busquil, La Pedrera, La Recueja, Los Cascajos, and El Escal. At Lobera, a funeral tombstone was found inscribed with the name of Thurscando. This tombstone is now in the House of Culture of Tafalla.

=== Middle Ages ===
The first historical mention of Tafalla dates from the tenth century in the Chronicle of Arib Ibn Said, which recounts a raid on Tafalla by Abd al-Rahman III during a campaign against the Kingdom of Pamplona, in the year 924. In 1043, the Tafallese helped King García III de Nájera defeat Ramiro I of Aragón in a battle on the fields of Torreta and Barranquiel. After this, the Tafallese were granted the titles of Noble, Loyal and Strong. Sancho Ramírez granted Tafalla its first charter, later confirmed by Sancho the Wise in 1157 and Theobald II in 1255. Sancho VII the Strong granted another charter to the Tafallese, freeing them from taxes.

In 1418, Carlos III the Noble granted the privilege of holding a fair, and in 1423, he granted Tafalla a seat in the Cortes among the "Good Towns," and declared the Tafallese free men. In the Civil War of Navarre, Tafalla first sided with the Beaumont confederacy, defending the rights of Carlos, Prince of Viana. After the Castilian-Aragonese invasion, Tafalla defended the legitimate kings of Navarre against the invaders.

=== Modern and Contemporary Age ===
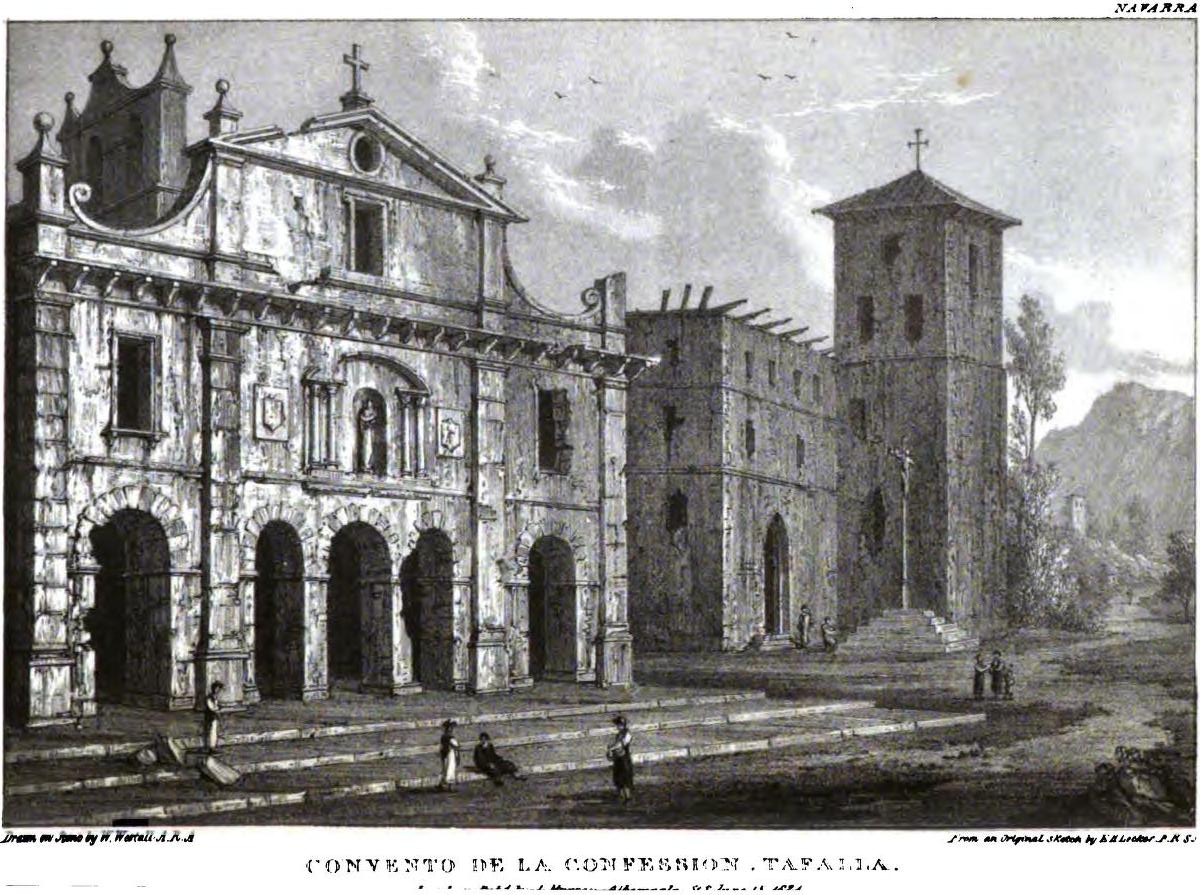
Convento de la Confession (Convent of the Concepcionistas Recoletas) (to the right) in Tafalla by Edward Hawke Locker in 1824, published in the work Views in Spain

Felipe IV granted Tafalla the title of city in the year 1636. During the War of Independence, the city was of strategic importance due to its proximity to Pamplona. Tafalla was occupied by the French in 1808, who turned it into a barracks. In 1812 Espoz y Mina retook the city, but in the battle the convent of San Francisco and the fifteenth century Palace were destroyed. The remains were demolished to build the current Plaza de Navarra in 1856. Tafalla suffered major floods in 1833 when the Congosto dam failed, and again in 1886. During the 19th century the city was provided with modern urban services, including public lighting with oil lanterns (1843), construction of the railway and its station that connects Pamplona and the Ebro (1860), and in 1866 a bridge across the Zidacos river to link the station with the city. Two schools were established in the 1880s: the College of PP Piarists (1883) and the San José School of the Daughters of the Cross (1888). The lighting system was electrified in 1895. In 1909, the Gorriti Theater opened, followed by the Spanish Casino (1922).

Tafalla was in the news in 2010, after a bull jumped into the stands at the bullring, during a bull-fighting contest. In July 2019, Tafalla was hit by damaging flash floods following torrential rain.

== Notable people ==
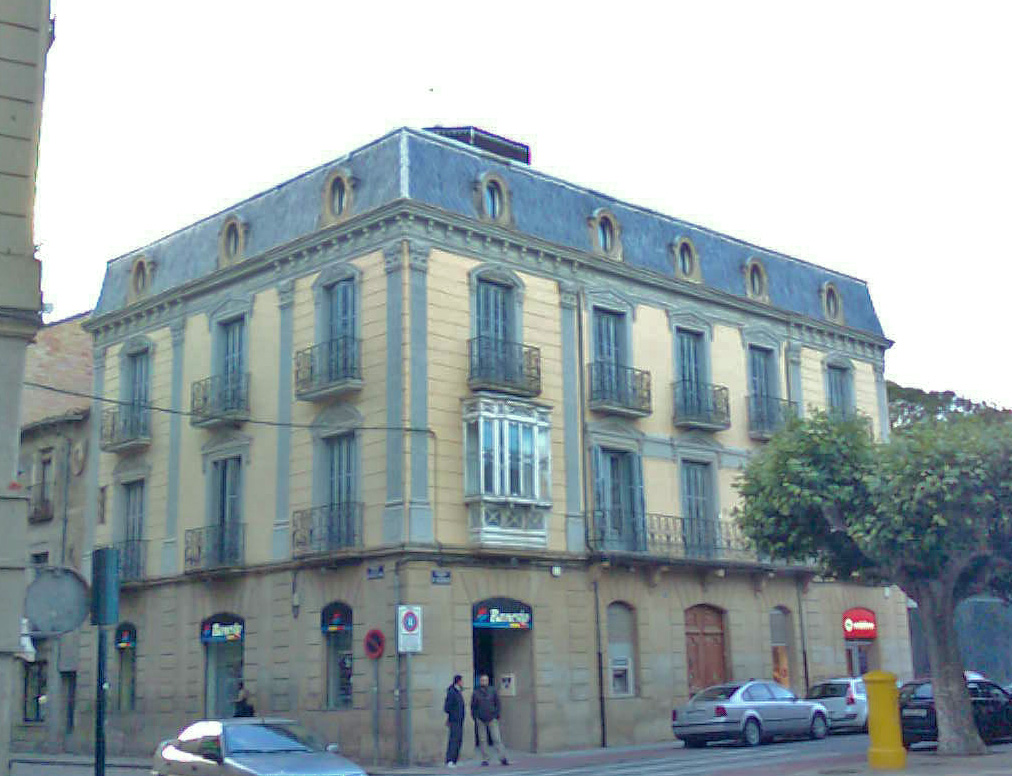
19th-century building in Tafalla

- Antonio Azarola y Gresillón, rear admiral of the Spanish Republican Navy
- Aitor Buñuel, footballer
- Maria Ascensión Nicol y Goñi the Blessed, Missionary.
- Florencio García Goyena, jurist
- Uxúa López, engineer, activist
- Carlos Solchaga, politician
- Ion Vélez, footballer

== Local celebrations ==
- 20 January, Saint Sebastian.
