= Añorbe =

Town and municipality in northern Spain

Coordinates: 42°40′N 1°43′W

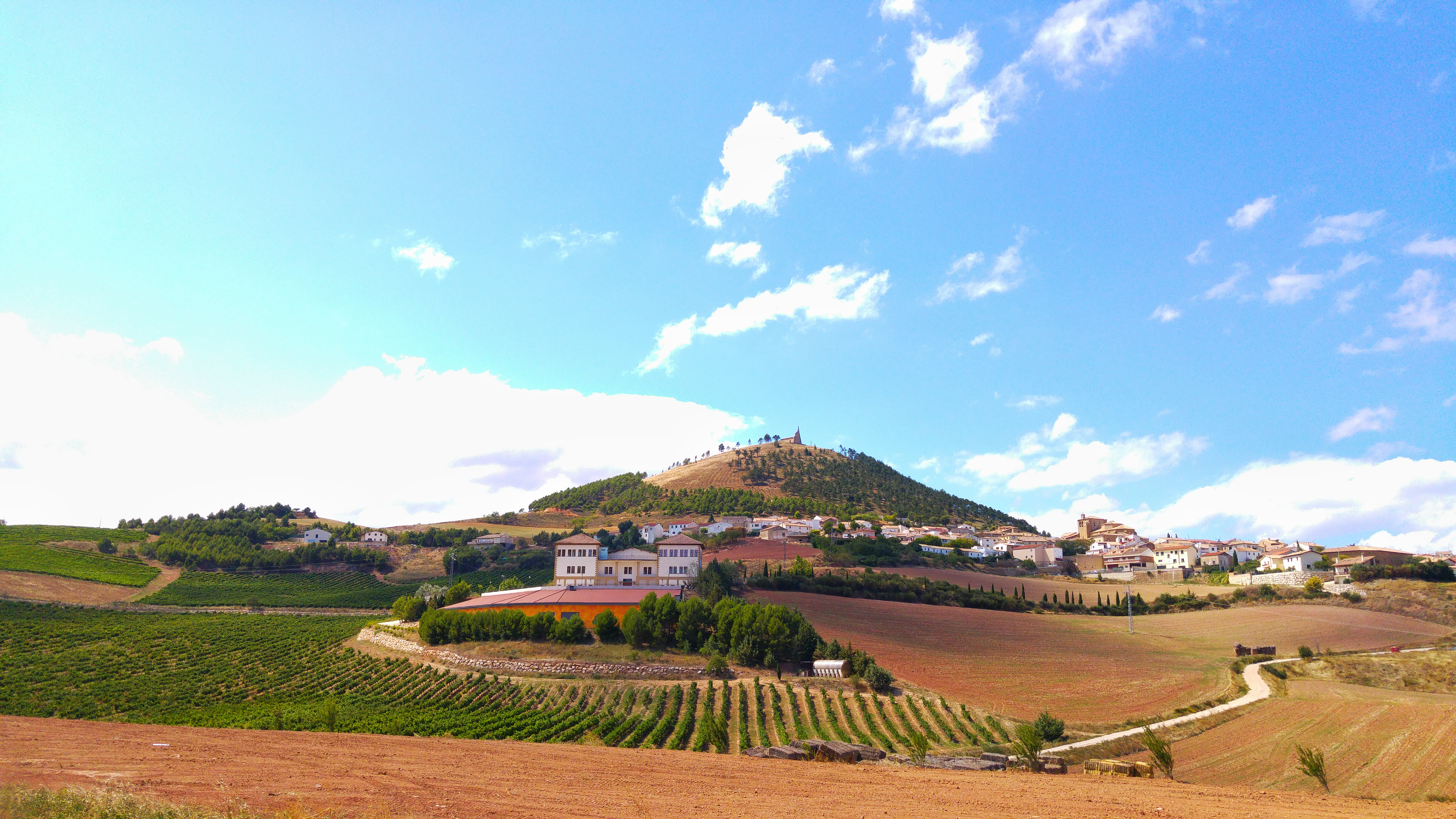
General view of Añorbe. Nekeas Winery in the foreground.

Añorbe is a town and municipality located in the autonomous community of Navarre, northern Spain.

Añorbe's flag

Añorbe's coat of arms
