= UXUA Casa Hotel & Spa =

Coordinates: 16°35′26″S 39°05′45″W

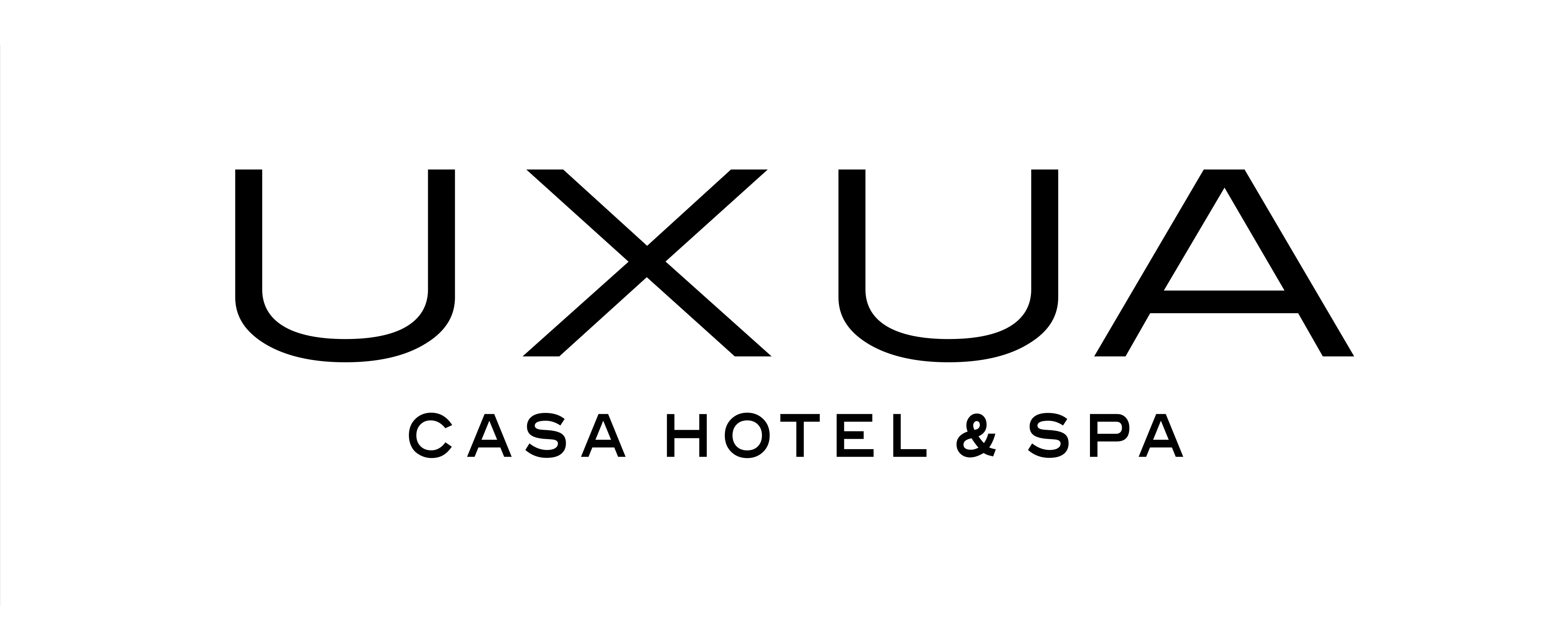
- Company type: Private
- Industry: Hospitality, tourism
- Founded: 2009
- Headquarters: Trancoso, Bahia Brazil
- Owner: Wilbert Das
- Website: www.uxua.com

UXUA Casa Hotel & Spa is a boutique hotel and Almescar spa located in Trancoso, Bahia, Brazil that was designed and built by Wilbert Das, Creative Director of Italian label Diesel S.p.A. from 1993 to 2009.

The hotel has casas and a tree house that is around an area called "the quadrado", which is a Unesco World Heritage Site. The casas are houses that were renovated, and some of them date to the 16th century. The property also has two restaurants.

== Festa de Sáo Brás ==
In 2011 Wilbert Das was appointed festeiro (honorary host) of Festa de Sáo Brás, a religious festival held every February 3 as a tradition dating back to colonial times in Trancoso. The event was captured by Brazilian director Cisma, in a short film he produced.
