= Didacus of Alcalá =

Franciscan lay brother, missionary and saint

Saint Didacus of Alcalá O.F.M.
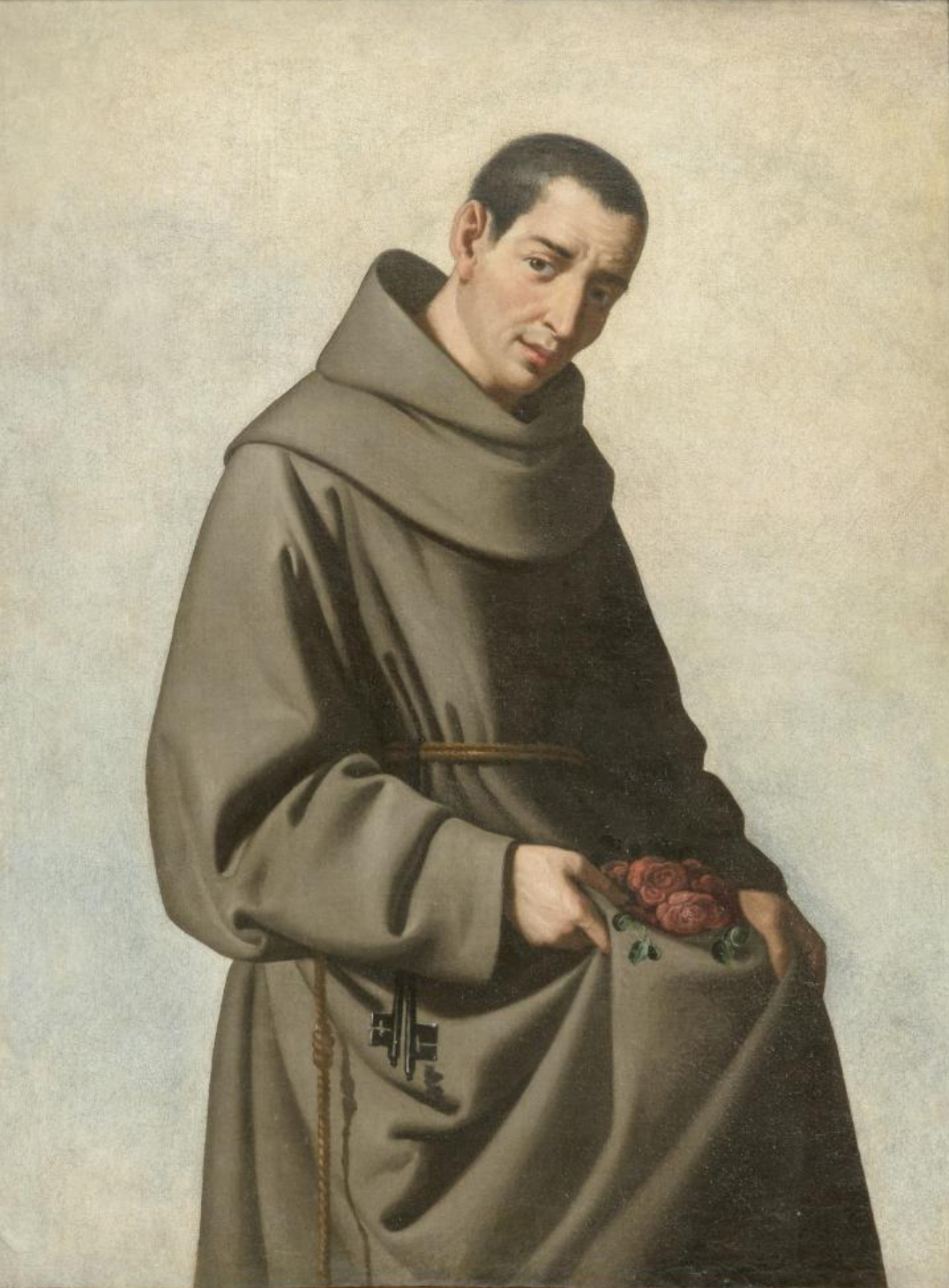
- San Diego de Alcalá by Francisco de Zurbarán

Religious and Missionary
- Born: c. 1400; San Nicolás del Puerto, Kingdom of Seville, Crown of Castile
- Died: 12 November 1463 (aged 62–63); Alcalá de Henares, Kingdom of Toledo, Crown of Castile
- Venerated in: Catholic Church
- Canonized: 10 July 1588, Saint Peter's Basilica, Papal States by Pope Sixtus V
- Major shrine: Ermita de San Diego, San Nicolás del Puerto, Seville, Spain
- Feast: 13 November, 7 November (Franciscan Order in the United States and the Roman Catholic Diocese of San Diego), 12 November (Valenzuela City)
- Attributes: Franciscan habit Cross; Lily; Roses gathered in his cloak Bread and Roses in a basket
- Patronage: Roman Catholic Diocese of San Diego, Franciscan Lay Brothers, Polo Church, Valenzuela City

Didacus of Alcalá (Spanish: Diego de Alcalá), also known as Diego de San Nicolás, was a Spanish Franciscan lay brother who served among the first group of missionaries to the newly conquered Canary Islands. He died at Alcalá de Henares on 12 November 1463 and is honored by the Catholic Church as a saint.

== History ==
Didacus was born c. 1400 into a poor but pious family in the small village of San Nicolás del Puerto in the Kingdom of Seville. As a child, he embraced the hermit life and, later, placed himself under the direction of a hermit priest living not far from his native town. He then led the life of a wandering hermit. Feeling called to the religious life, he applied for admission to the Observant (or Reformed) branch of the Order of Friars Minor at the friary in Albaida and was sent to the friary in Arruzafa, near Córdoba, where he was received as a lay brother. (Note: The friary had been founded in 1409 and soon became a major center of the reform of the Order on the Iberian peninsula. It survives as a Parador.) As a friar he worked at various manual trades to support the brotherhood.

During his years living in that location, he journeyed to the villages in the regions surrounding Córdoba, Cádiz, and Seville, where he would preach to the people. A strong devotion to him still exists in those towns.

== Missionary ==
Didacus was sent to the new friary of the Order in Arrecife on the island of Lanzarote, part of the Canary Islands. That island had been conquered by Jean de Béthencourt about 40 years earlier and was still in the process of introducing the native Guanche people to Christianity. He was assigned to the post of porter.

In 1445, Didacus was appointed as Guardian of the Franciscan community on the island of Fuerteventura, where the Observant Franciscans soon founded the Friary of St. Bonaventure. Though it was an exception to the ordinary rules for a lay brother to be named to this position, his great zeal, prudence, and sanctity justified this choice. His defense of the indigenous people against the colonizers precipitated his return to Spain in 1449.

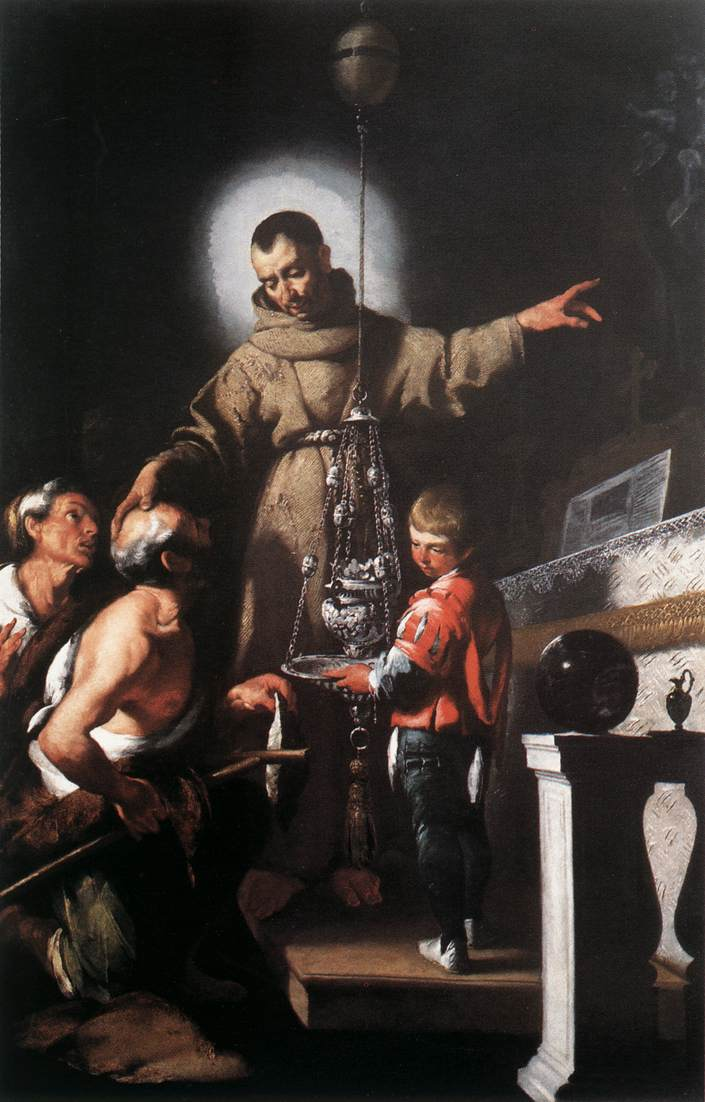
The Miracle of Didacus of Alcalá by Bernardo Strozzi

In 1450, Didacus was recalled to Spain, from which point he went to Rome to share in the Jubilee Year proclaimed by Pope Nicholas V, and to be present at the canonization of Bernardine of Siena. In addition to the vast crowds of pilgrims arriving in Rome for Jubilee Year, thousands of friars had headed to Rome to take part in the celebration of one of the pillars of their Order. An epidemic broke out in the city. Didacus served as infirmarian and spent three months caring for the sick at the friary attached to the Basilica of Santa Maria in Ara Coeli, and his biographers record the miraculous cure of many whom he attended through his pious intercession.

He was then recalled again to Spain and was sent by his superiors to the Friary of Santa María de Jesús in Alcalá, where he spent the remaining years of his life in penance, solitude, and contemplation. There he died on 12 November 1463 due to an abscess. His body was also rumored to have remained incorrupt, did not undergo rigor mortis and continued to emit a pleasant odor.

A chapel, the Ermita de San Diego, was built in Didacus's birthplace between 1485 and 1514 to enshrine his remains in his native town.

== Veneration ==
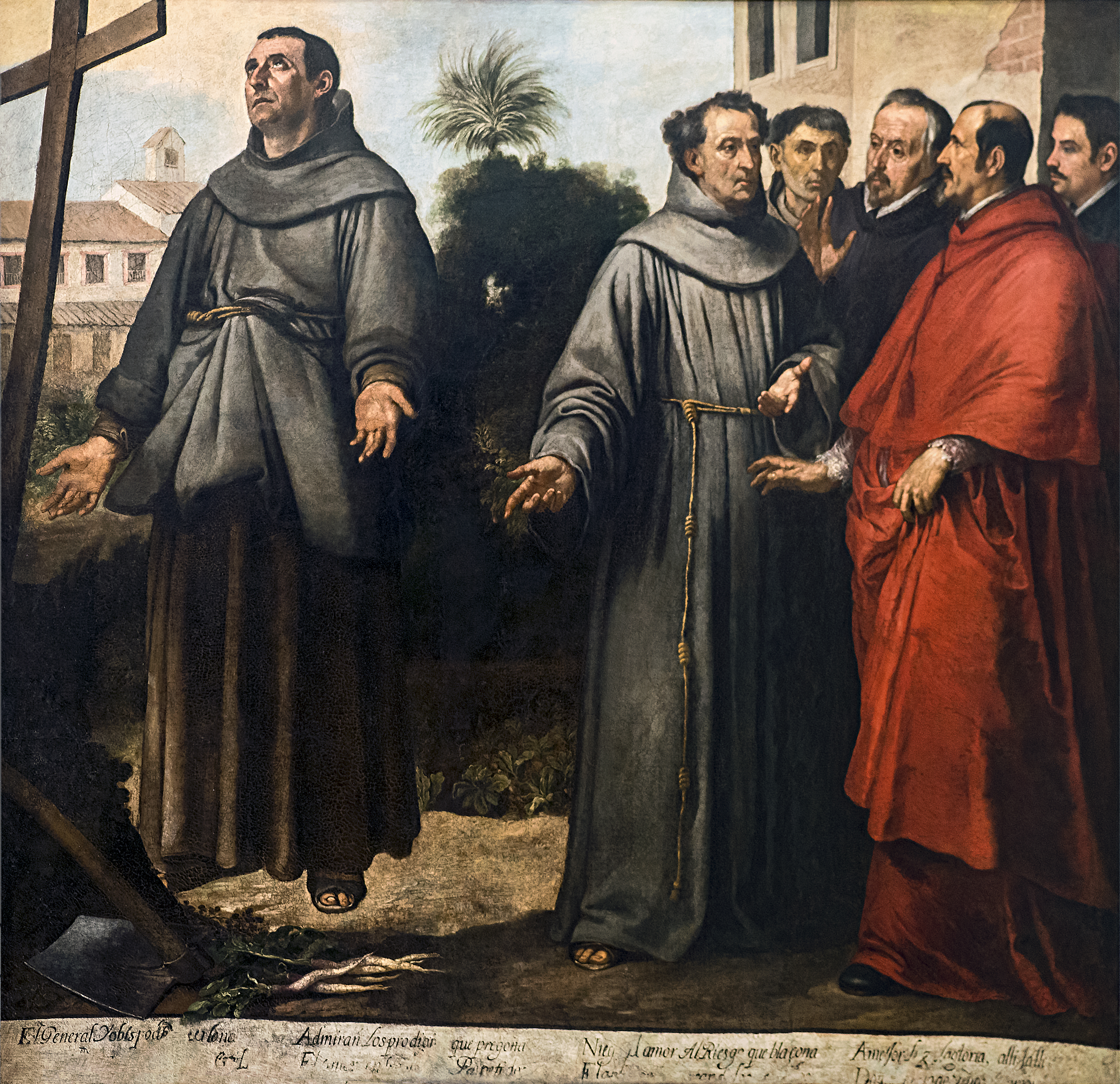
Saint Didacus in Ecstasy Before the Cross by Murillo, 1645–46

Didacus was canonized by Pope Sixtus V in 1588, the first of a lay brother of the Order of Friars Minor. His feast day is celebrated on 13 November, since 12 November, the anniversary of his death, was occupied, first by that of Pope Martin I, then by that of the Basilian monk and Eastern Catholic bishop and martyr Josaphat Kuntsevych. In the United States the feast day is celebrated on 7 November, due to the feast of Saint Frances Xavier Cabrini.

Didacus is the saint to whom the Franciscan mission that bears his name, and which developed into the City of San Diego, California, was dedicated. He is the co-patron of the Roman Catholic Diocese of San Diego.

The Spanish painter Bartolomé Estéban Murillo is noted for painting several representations of Didacus of Alcalá.

== Miracles ==
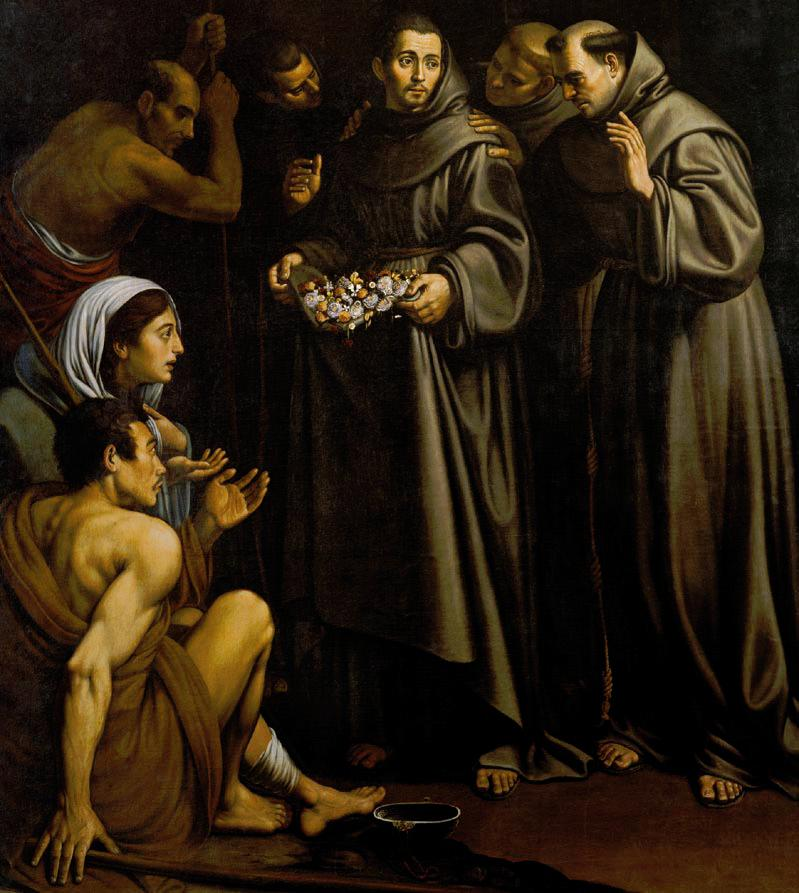
San Diego de Alcalá, Miracle of the Roses, Niccolo Betti

- Didacus is associated with a miracle of the roses. He often took bread from the monastery's dining table to give to the poor. One day, leaving the convent with a cloak full of food, he was accused and challenged to open his cloak; miraculously, the loaves of bread had changed into roses.
- On a hunting trip, Henry IV of Castile fell from his horse and injured his arm. In intense pain and with his doctors unable to relieve his agony, he went to Alcalá and prayed to Didacus for a cure. Didacus's body was removed from his casket and placed beside the king. Henry then kissed the body and placed Didacus's hand on his injured arm. The king felt the pain disappear and his arm immediately regained its former strength.
- Don Carlos, Prince of Asturias, son of King Philip II of Spain, was of a difficult and rebellious character. On the night of 19 April 1562, he was groping around in the dark after a night spent with some ladies when he fell down a flight of stairs and landed on his head. There he was found the next morning, unconscious and partially paralyzed. He later became blind, developed a high fever and his head swelled to an enormous size. In a moment of lucidity, he asked that he wanted to make a personal petition to Saint Didacus. Didacus's body was brought to his chambers. The prior of the convent placed one of Carlos's hands upon the chest of Didacus, whereupon the prince fell into a deep and peaceful sleep. Six hours later, he awoke and related that in a dream, he saw Didacus telling him that he would not die. The prince recovered from his brush with death. Other sources have Didacus's body laid on the prince's bed.

== Gallery ==
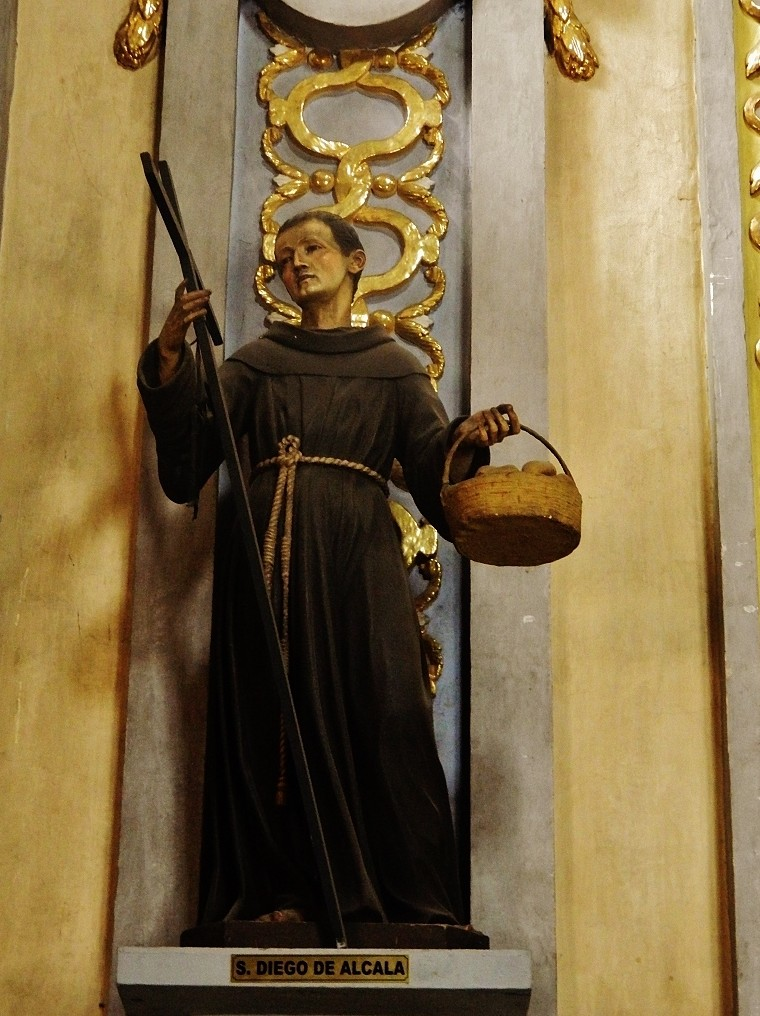
Saint Didacus, Former Convent and Parish Church of Santa Clara, Puebla de los Ángeles, Mexico

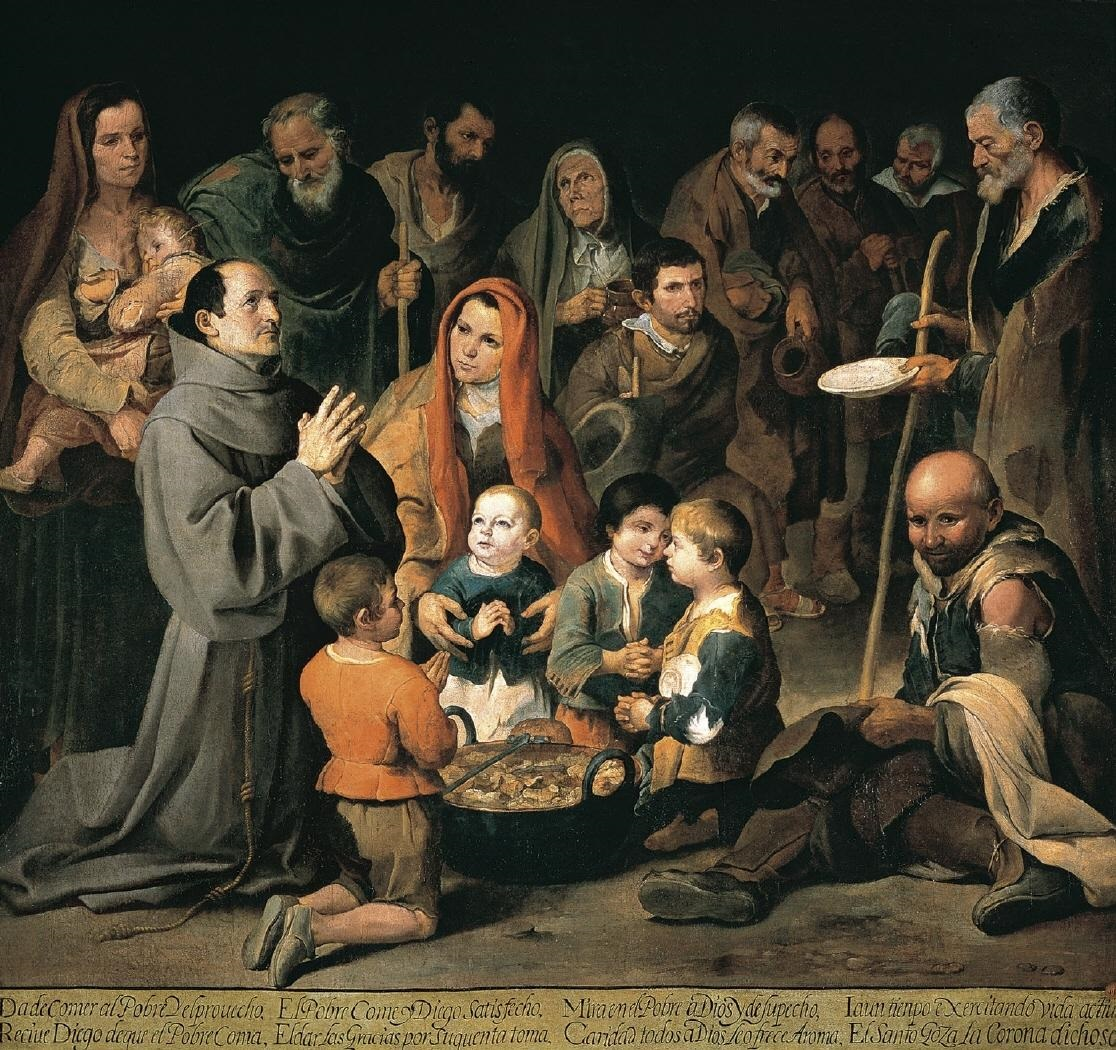
Saint Didacus feeding the poor, Murillo

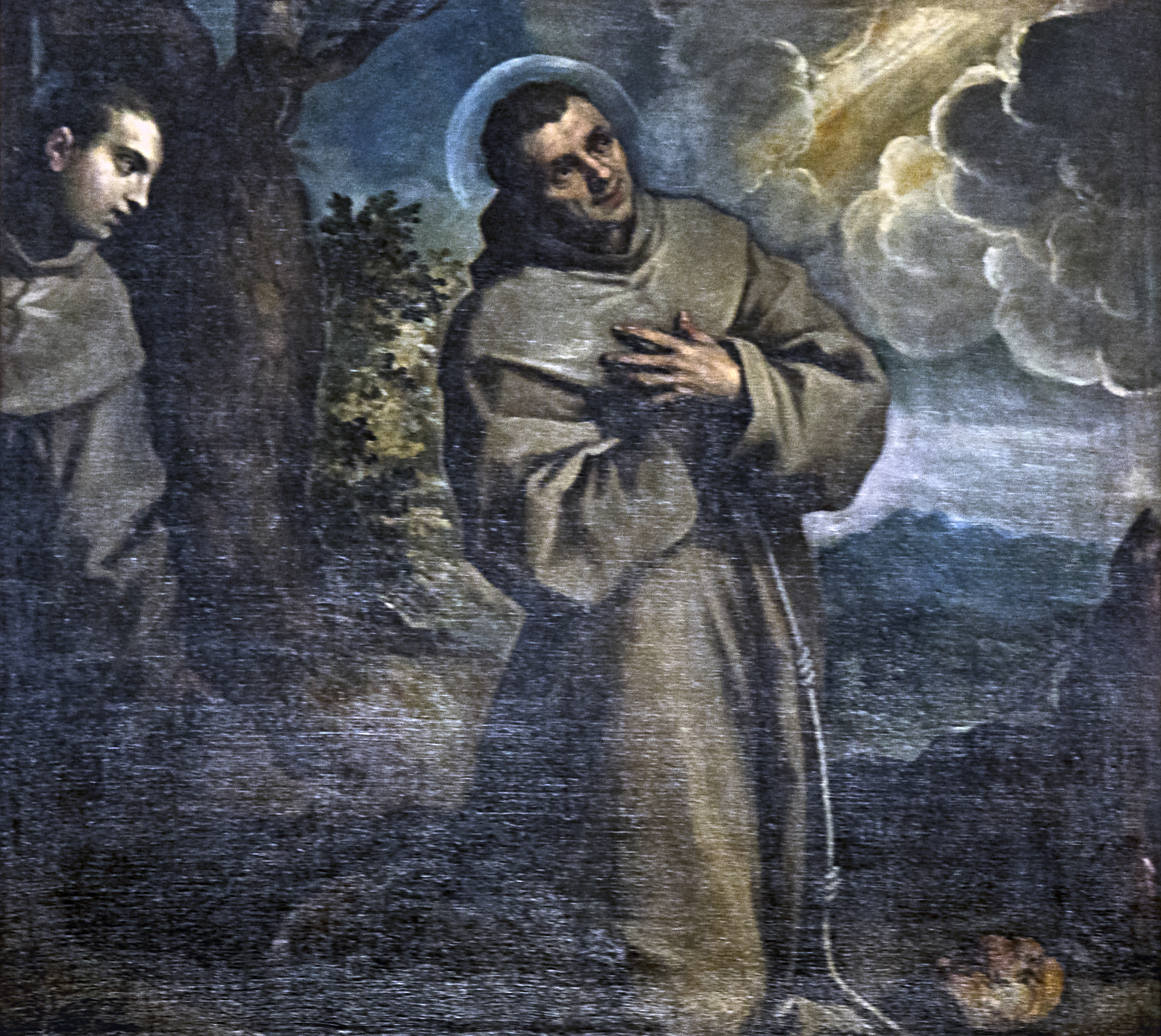
Saint Didacus of Alcalá in extasy by Palma il Giovane

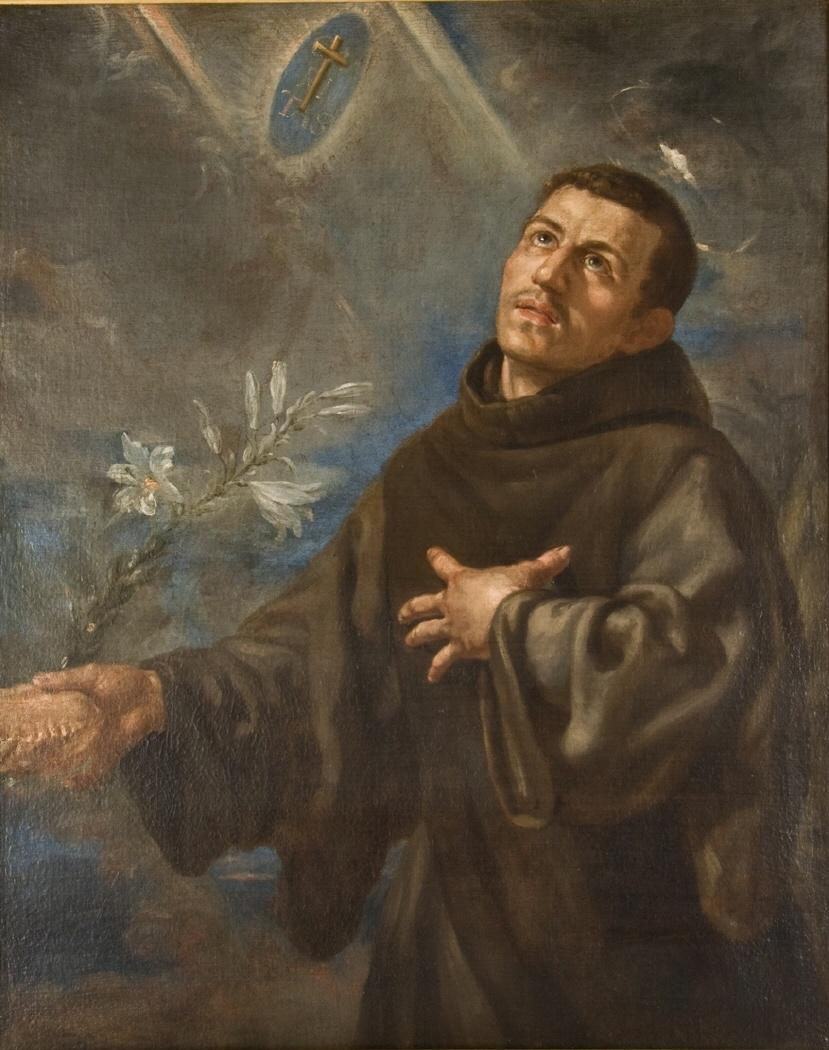
Didacus of Alcalá, attributed to Francisco Rizi (Museo Cerralbo, Madrid)

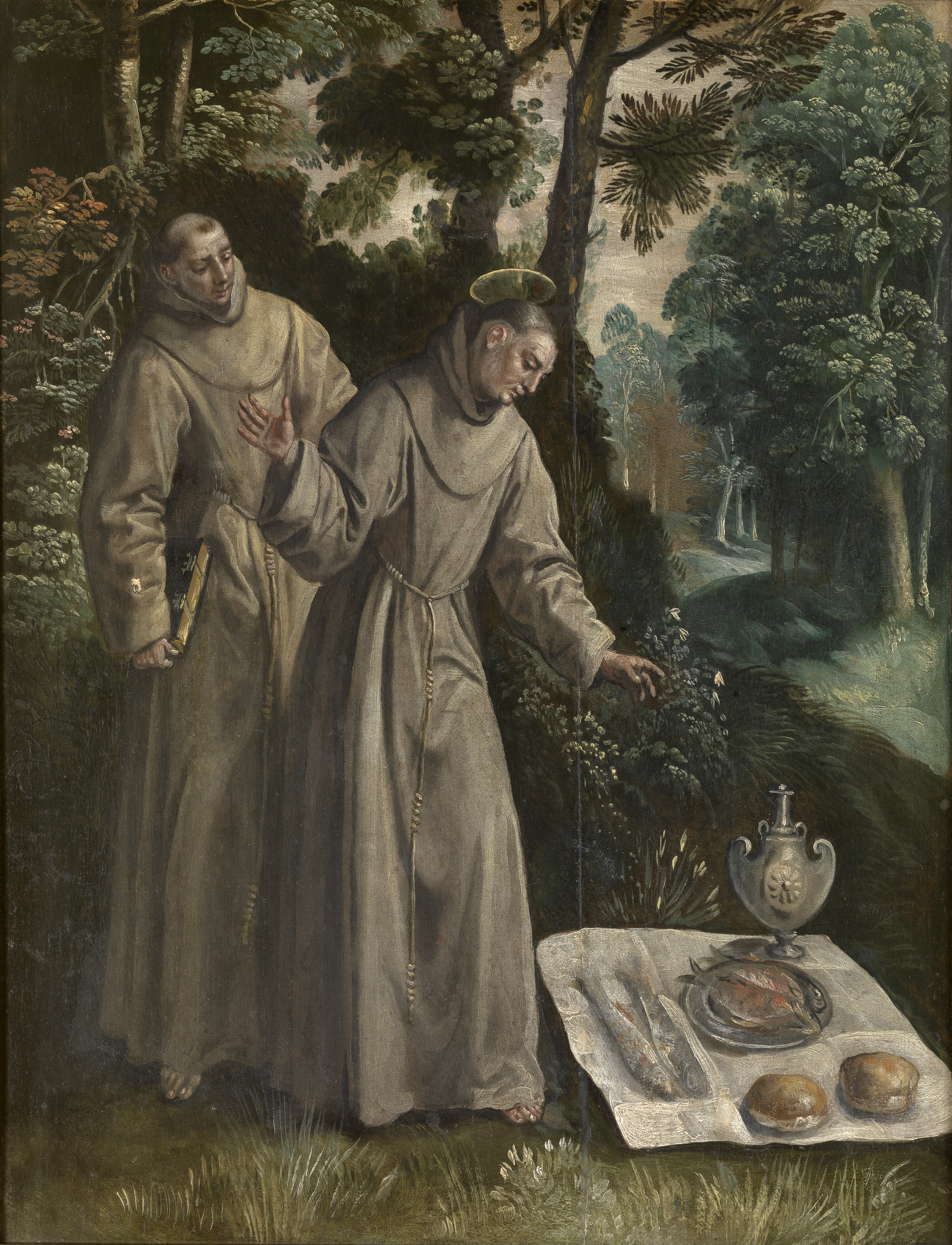
Saint Didacus Finds a Miraculous Meal by Maerten de Vos

== Mechanical model ==
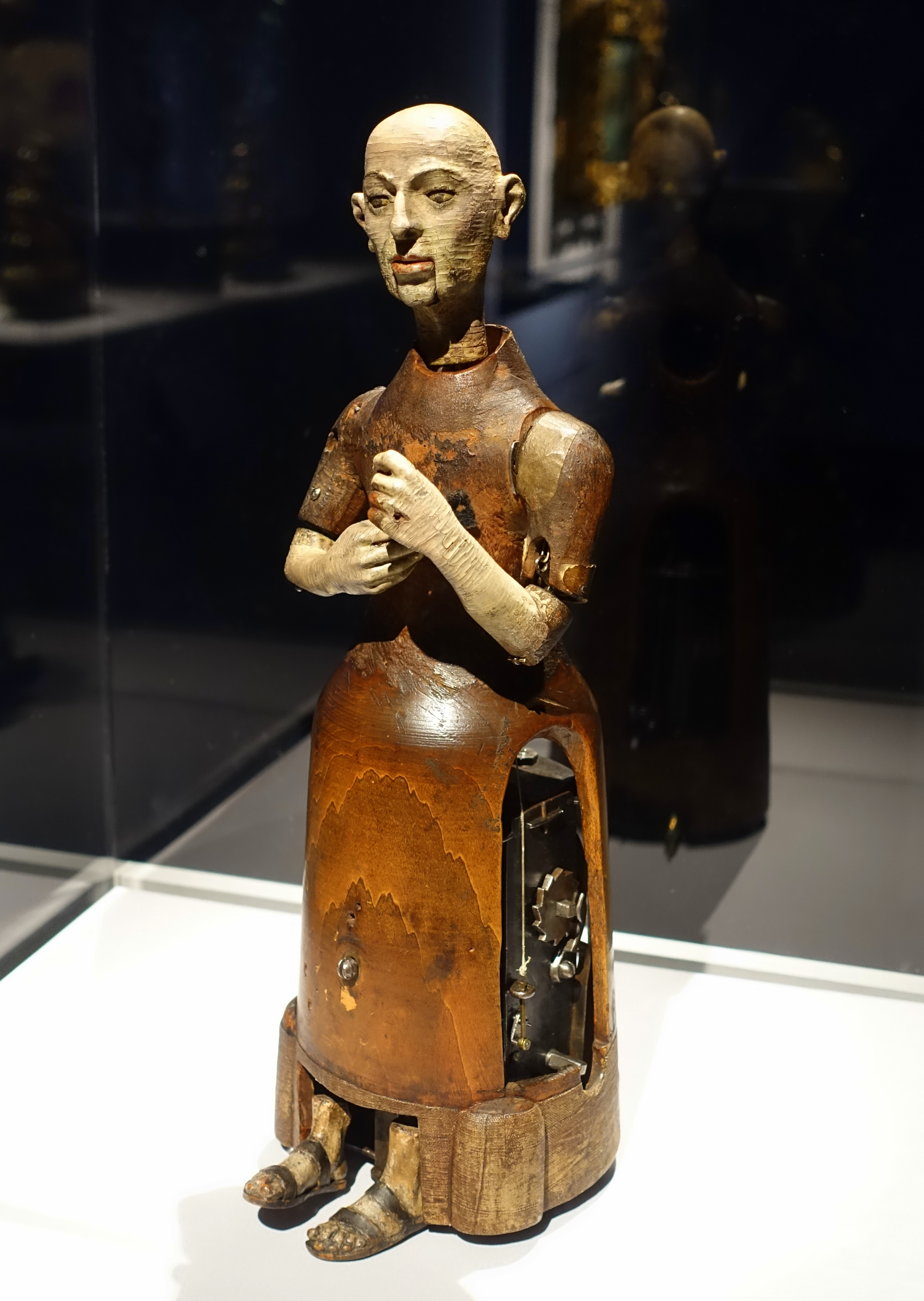
The monk automaton exhibited in the Metropolitan Museum of Art in 2020.

The Smithsonian Institution holds a clockwork automaton of a monk. The model would perform a number of set actions, including the beating of the breast which accompanies the Mea culpa prayer. A possible provenance would be a presumed model of Didacus, commissioned by Philip II of Spain to Juanelo Turriano, mechanic to Emperor Charles V.

Historical theories for why the friar was built include that Philip II wished to share the miracle of his son's recovery with his people; or the clockwork friar provided a portable model of "how to pray" which could be displayed around the kingdom.

== See also ==
- Mission San Diego de Alcalá
