= Polo Church =

Roman Catholic church in Valenzuela, Philippines

- San Diego de Alcala Parish Church
- Saint Didacus of Alcala Parish Church
- Simbahang Parokya ng San Diego ng Alcala (Filipino)
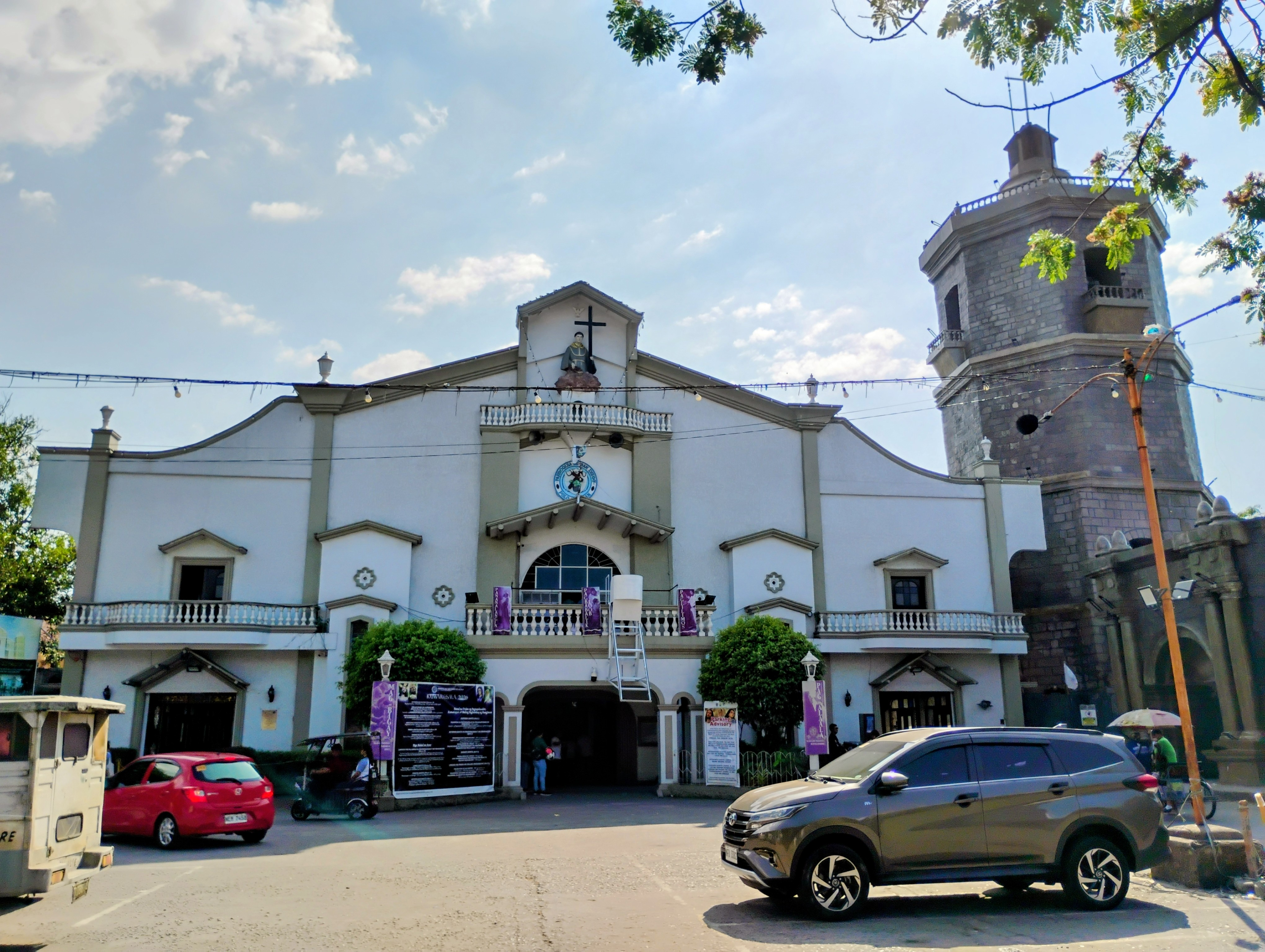
- Church facade in 2026

- Location in Metro Manila Location in Luzon Location in the Philippines
- 14°42′27″N 120°56′44″E
- Location: Valenzuela, Philippines
- Country: Philippines
- Denomination: Roman Catholic

History
- Status: Parish church
- Dedication: Saint Didacus

Architecture
- Functional status: Active
- Architectural type: Church building
- Style: Baroque

Specifications
- Materials: adobe bricks

Administration
- Archdiocese: Manila
- Diocese: Malolos

Clergy
- Archbishop: His Eminence José F. Advincula Jr., D.D.
- Bishop(s): Most Rev. Dennis C. Villarojo, D.D., Ph.D.
- Priest: Rev. Fr. Francisco G. Carson

San Diego de Alcala Parish Church (Filipino: Simbahang Parokya ng San Diego ng Alcala), colloquially known as Polo Church (Filipino: Simbahan ng Polo), is a Roman Catholic church in Valenzuela, located about 15.5 kilometers (9.6 mi) north of Manila in the Philippines. It is under the jurisdiction of the Diocese of Malolos. The original church was the oldest church in the city of Valenzuela, built by Father Juan Taranco and finished by Father Jose Valencia in 1632. Destroyed during World War II, its surviving belfry is the oldest in the city.

== History ==
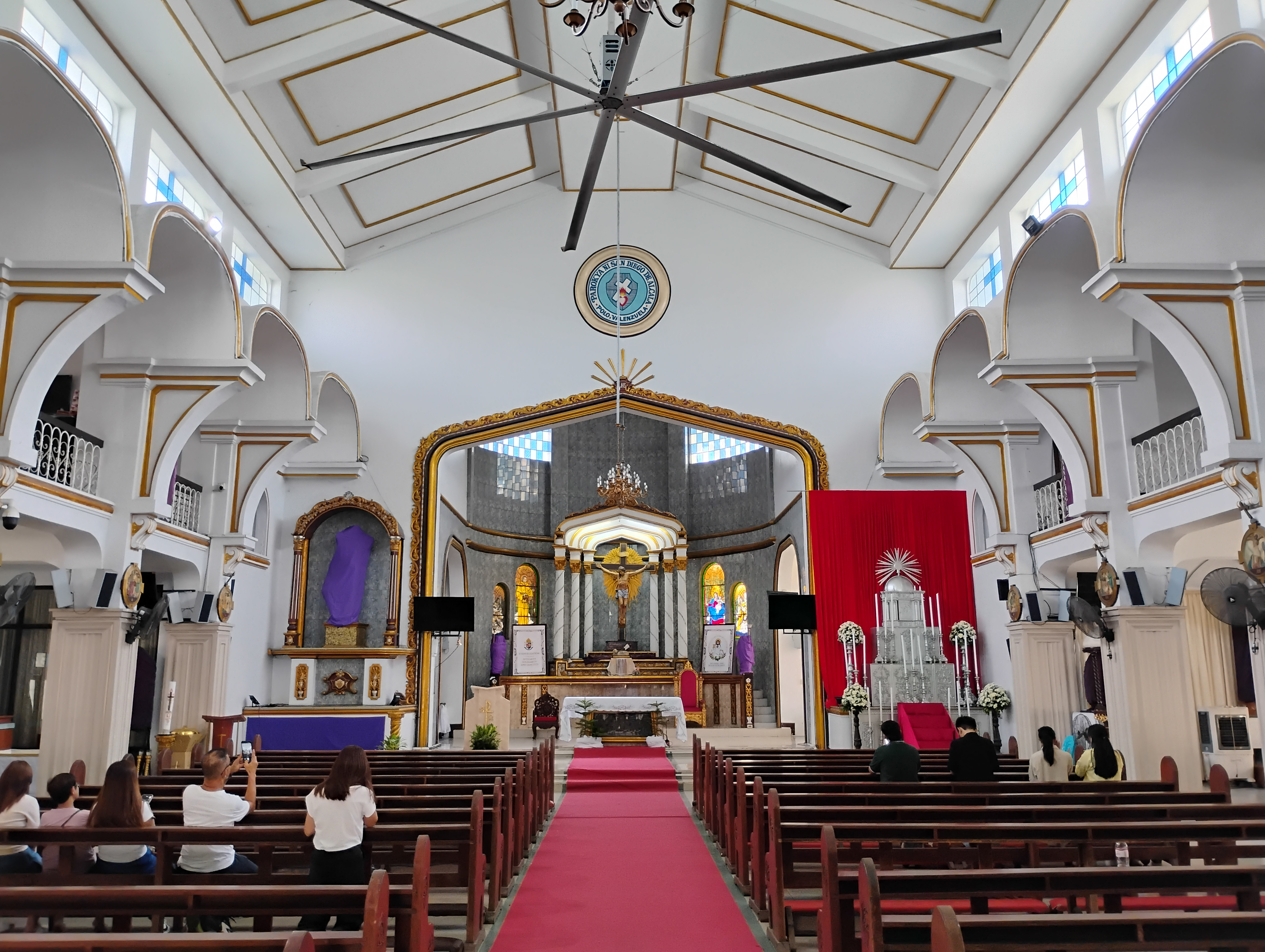
Church interior in 2026

The Church of San Diego de Alcala in Brgy. Polo in Valenzuela was completed in 1632. Residents were forced into labor to complete the church after the town gained its independence in 1623 from Catangalan through the efforts of Father Juan Taranco and Don Juan Monsod, the barangay head of Polo. The main structure, as well as its records, was destroyed by bombs during the Japanese occupation of the Philippines in World War II. The belfry and entrance are the only parts of the four-century old edifice that remain today. They have been preserved by the citizens of Polo (now Valenzuela City).

== Bell tower ==
The surviving bell tower and entrance of the first San Diego de Alcala Church

The belfry or bell tower of San Diego de Alcala Church is a cultural and religious relic of the bygone Spanish era. A new church has since been rebuilt and renovated adjacent to the ruins, serving as an aesthetic counterpoint to the largely unchanged tower.

== Feast day ==
Residents of barangays Polo and Poblacion celebrate the feast day of San Diego de Alcala on November 12 every year. Together with the fiesta, the town also celebrates the "Putong Polo Festival", a food festival honoring the putong Polo, a local variety of the Philippine rice cake puto.

== Gallery ==
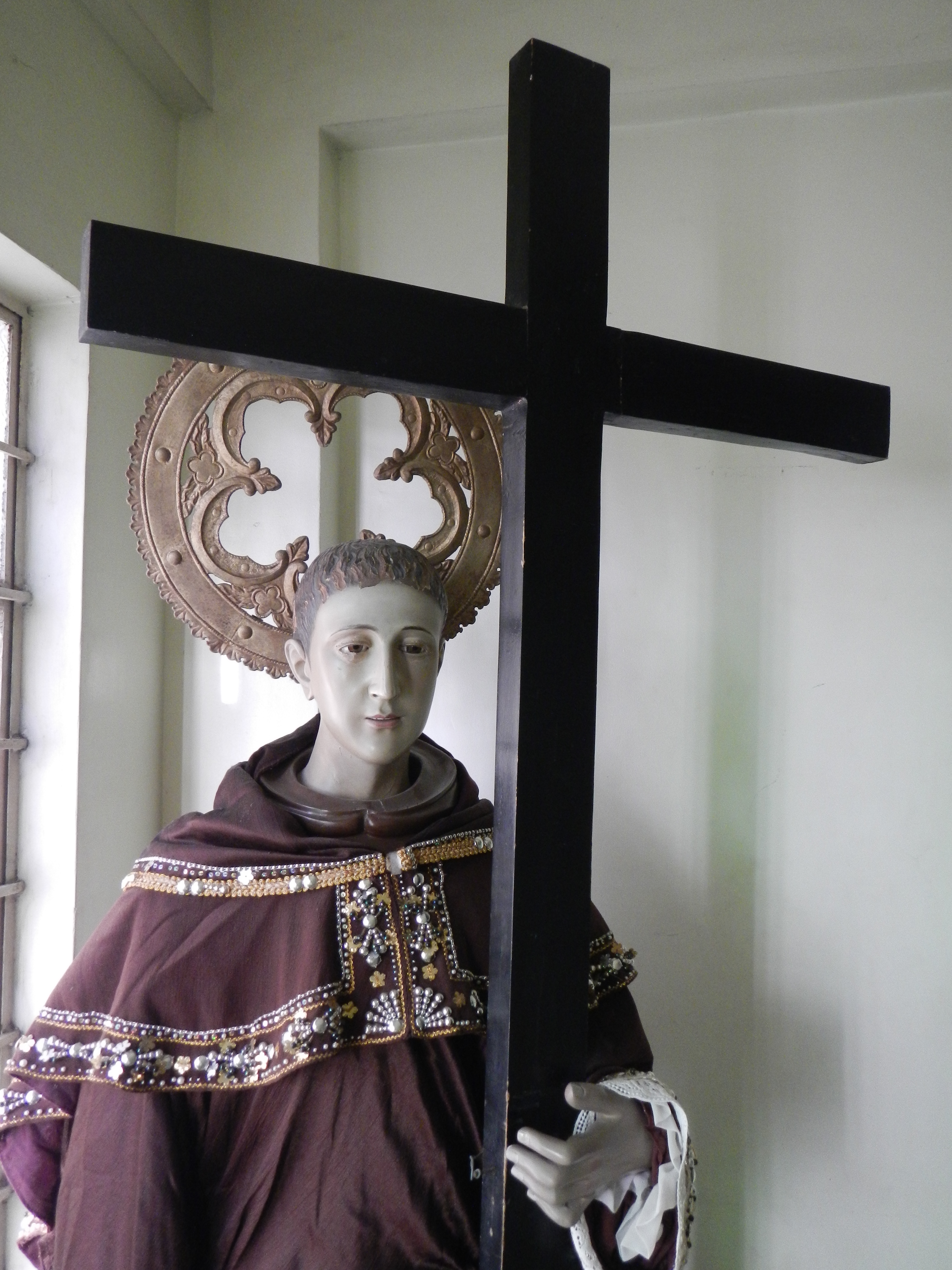
Saint Didacus of Alcala statue

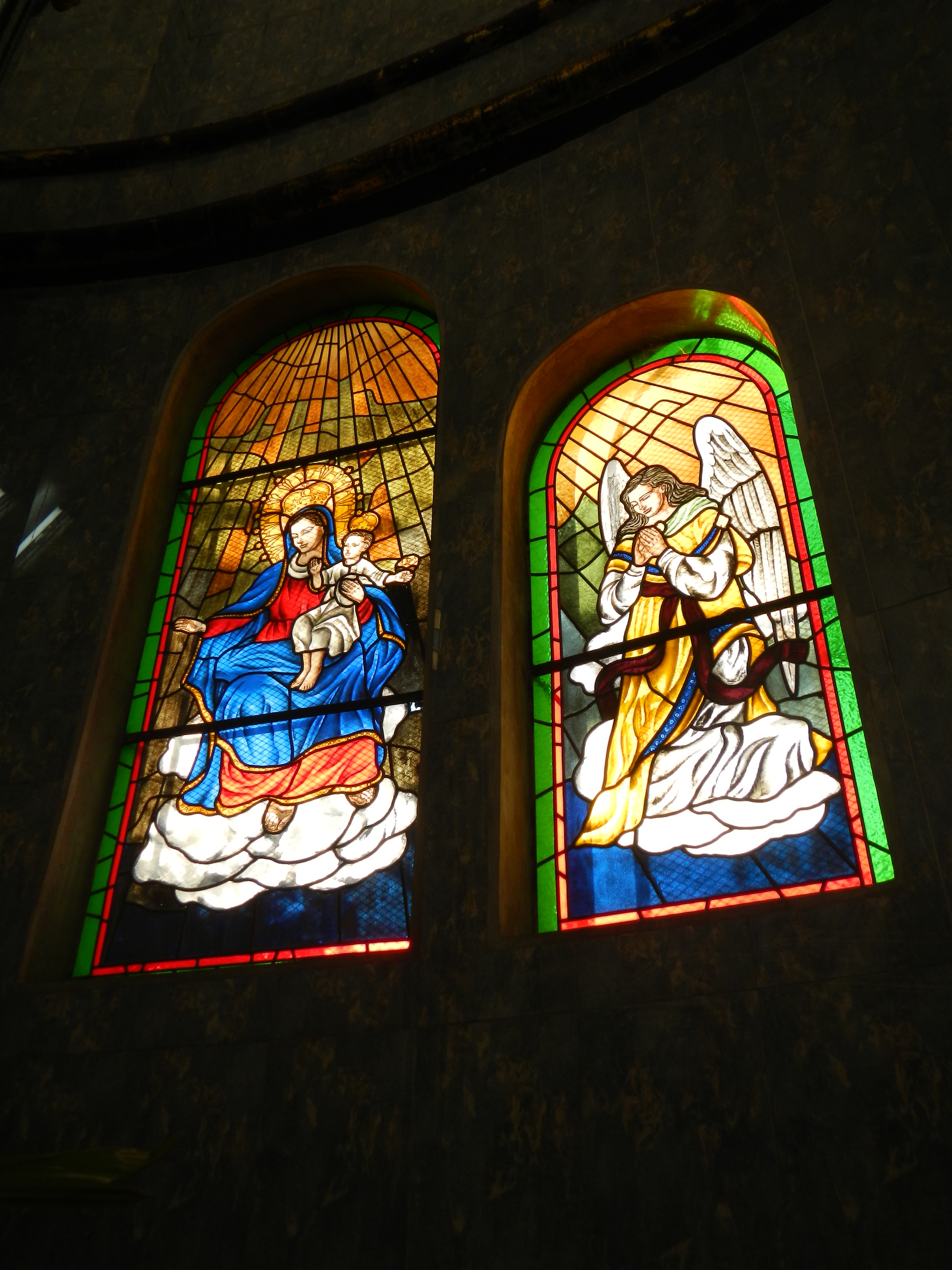
Stained glass windows

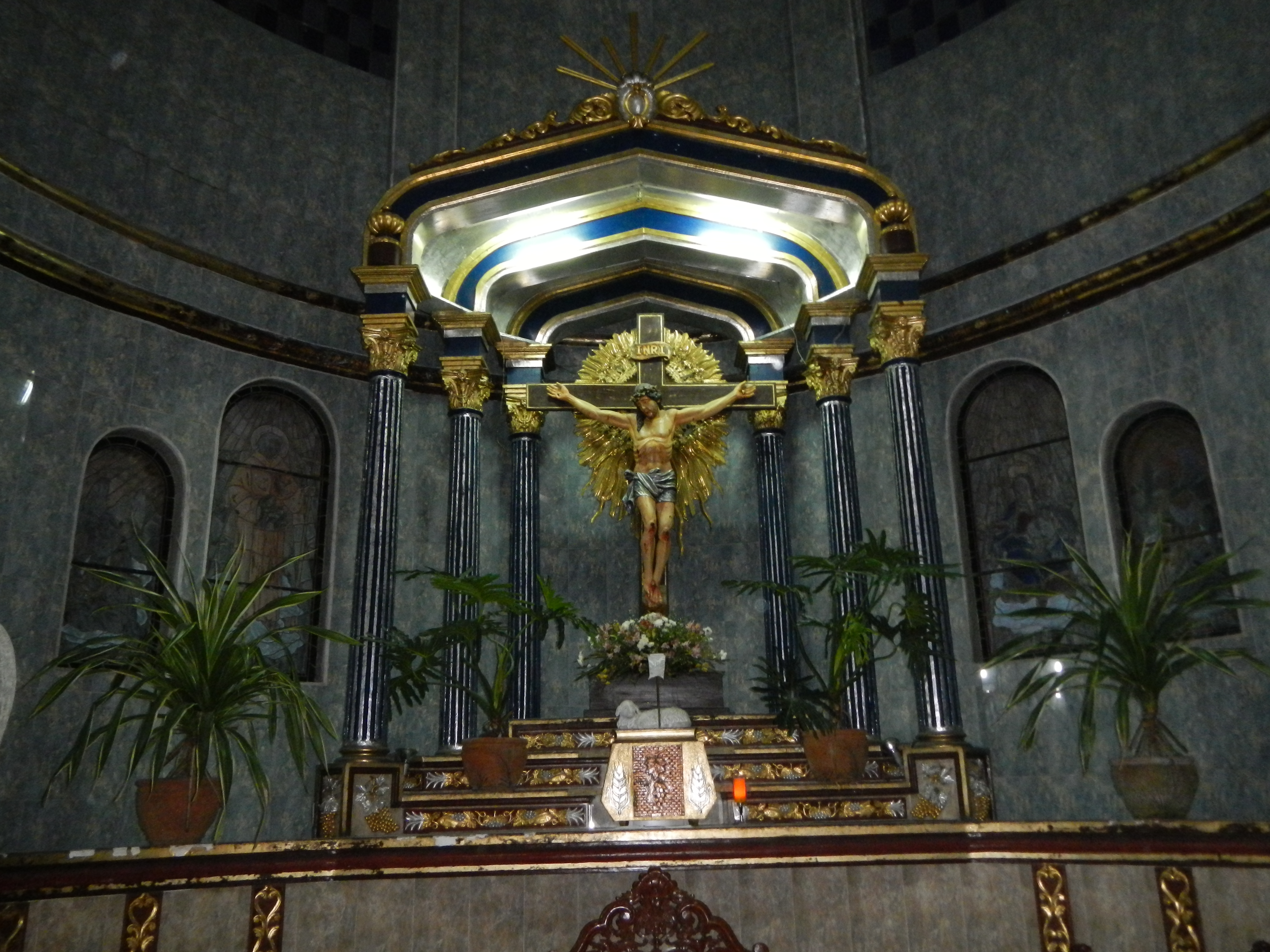
Church altar and reredos

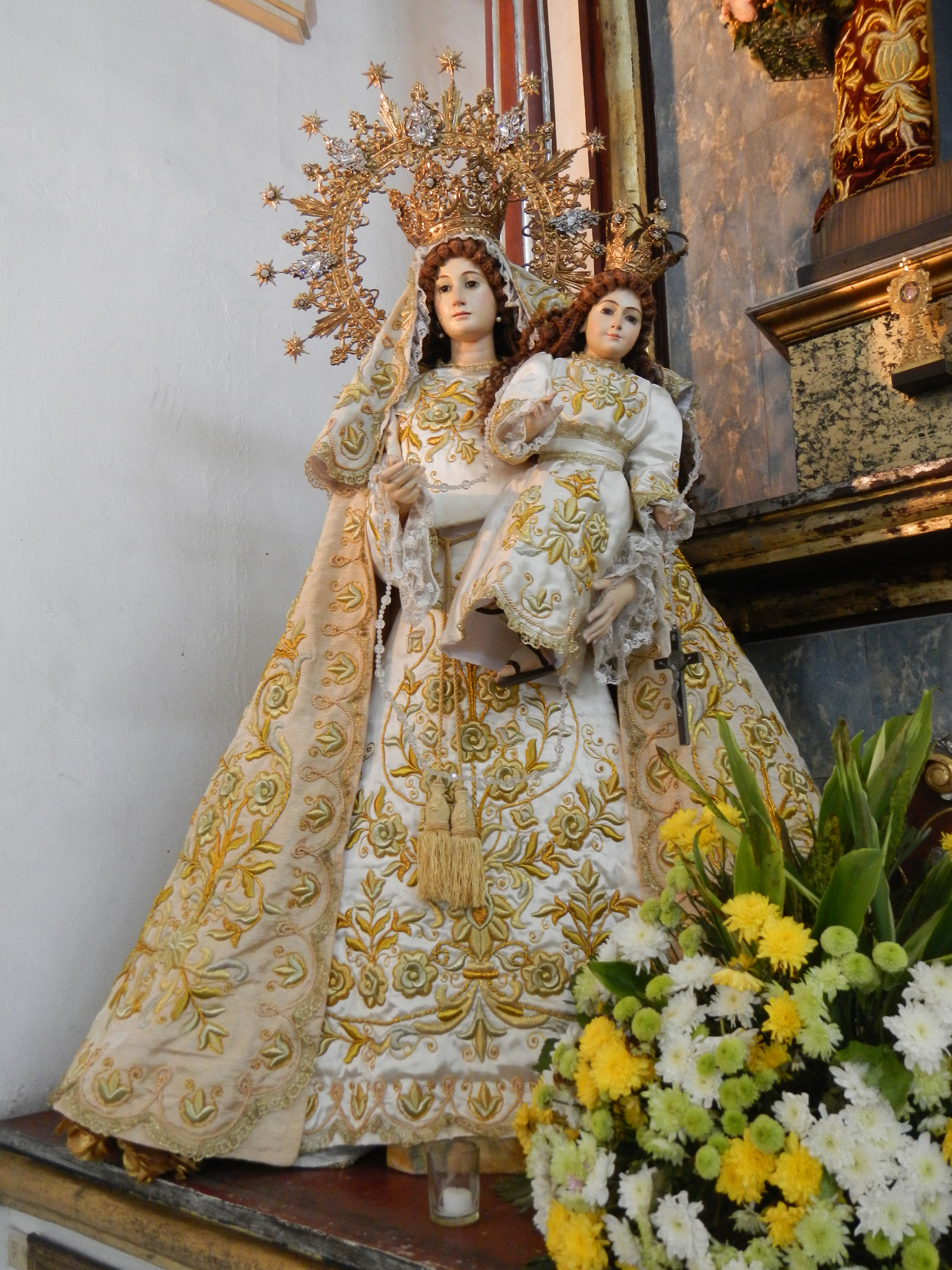
Our Lady of the Rosary

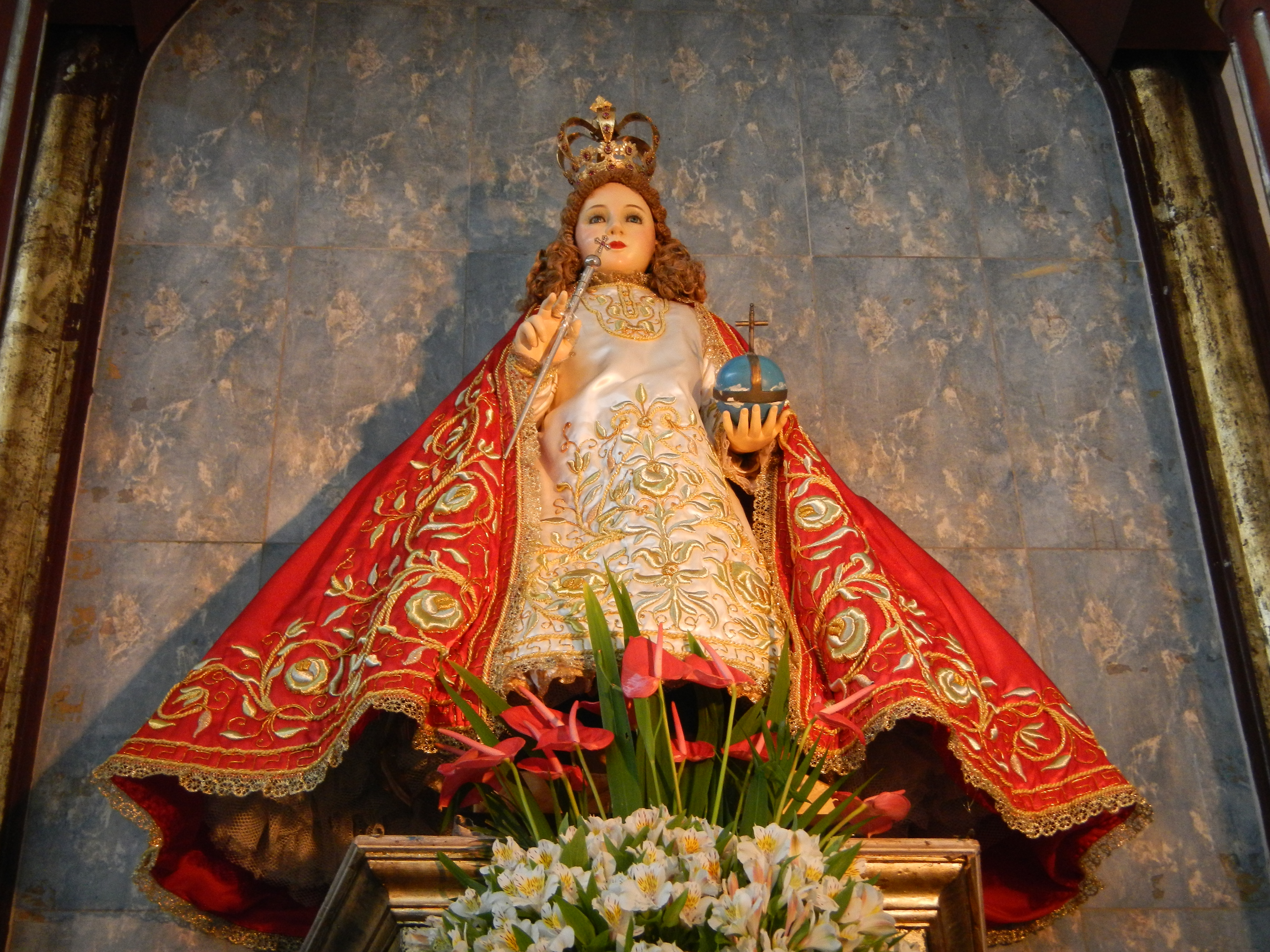
Santo Niño de Cebú

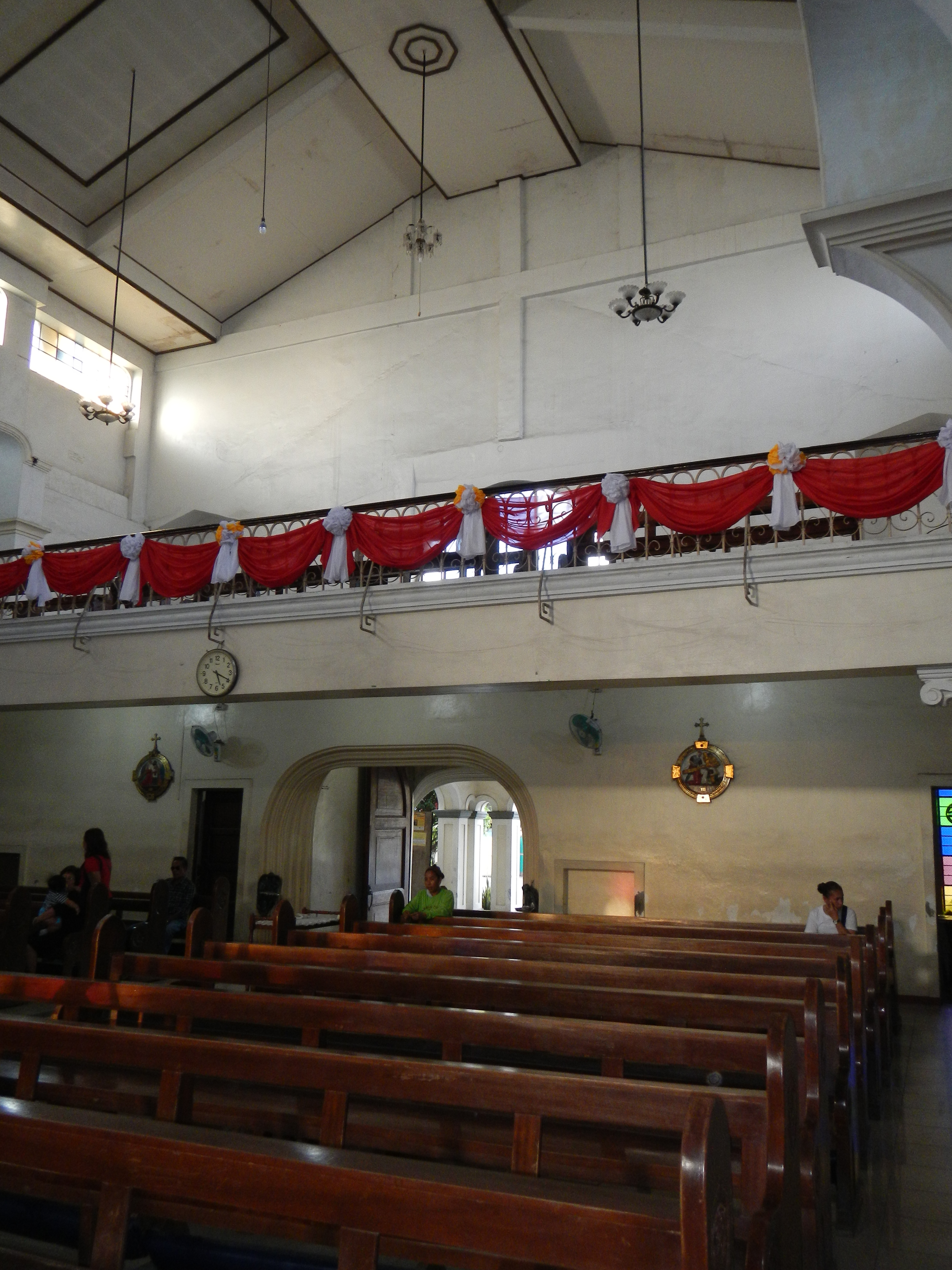
Choir loft
