= San Nicolás del Puerto =

Coordinates: 38°00′N 5°39′W

- Coat of arms

- Location in Spain.
- Country: Spain
- Autonomous community: Andalusia

Area
  - Total: 44.94 km^{2} (17.35 sq mi)
- Elevation: 590 m (1,940 ft)

Population (2025-01-01)
  - Total: 604
  - Density: 13.4/km^{2} (34.8/sq mi)
- Time zone: UTC+1 (CET)
  - Summer (DST): UTC+2 (CEST)
- Website: www.sannicolasdelpuerto.es

San Nicolás del Puerto is a municipality in the autonomous community of Andalusia, province of Seville, Spain.

== See also ==
- List of municipalities in Seville
