= Baliwag Museum and Library =

Historic mansion in Bulacan

- Museo ng Baliwag (Filipino)
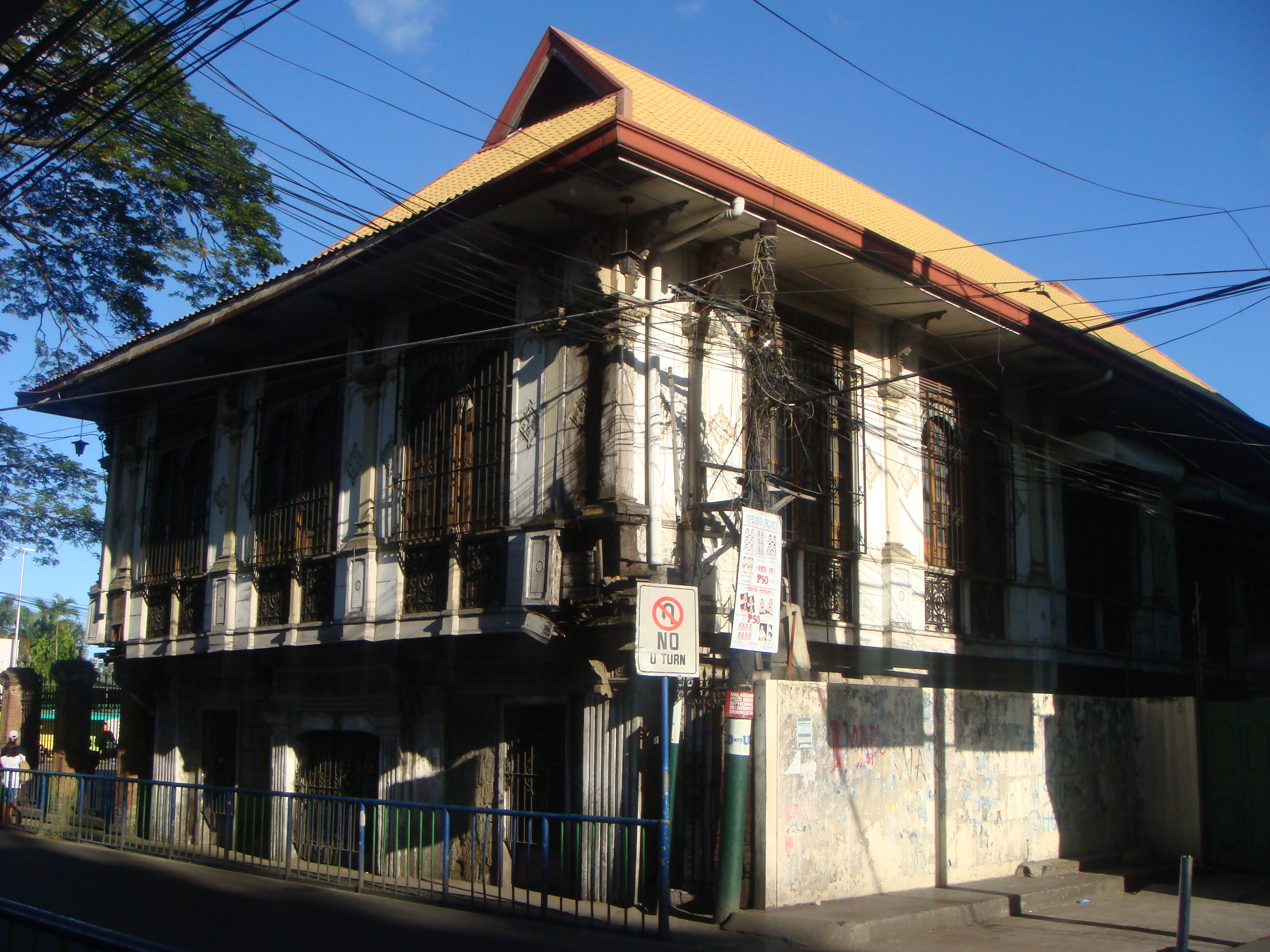
- Sentro ng Kalinangan at Kasaysayan ng Baliwag (Filipino)
- Interactive map of the Baliwag Museum and Library area
- Former names: Lumang Munisipyo (Filipino)
- Alternative names: Old Municipio

General information
- Status: active
- Type: Mansion
- Architectural style: Bahay na Bato
- Location: Poblacion, Baliwag Town Proper, Cagayan Valley road, Baliwag
- Coordinates: 14°58′02″N 120°53′04″E
- Construction started: 1915
- Inaugurated: 1998
- Renovated: 1993
- Owner: Baliwag, Bulacan Local Government

Technical details
- Floor count: One with a second floor
- Floor area: 500 sq. m.

Website
- web.nlp.gov.ph/nlp/?q=node%2F2604

The Baliwag Municipal Library and Museum (also referred to as the Tahanan ng Kasaysayan at Kalinangan ng Baliwag) which is currently housed at the Lumang Munisipyo (Old Municipal Town Hall) is the town's center for historical and cultural heritage.

This landmark is owned and administered by the City of Baliwag. The heritage-historic Filipino-colonial mansion Bahay na Bato the official repository (established in 1998 as a natural history and ethnography museum) of Baliwag and Bulacan province.

Baliwag Museo is located in Town Proper, Old Municipal Bldg., Cagayan Valley Road, Poblacion, Baliwag, Bulacan. It is 150 meters from the heritage St. Augustine Parish Church of Baliuag.

== History ==
Baliwag, Bulacan, was the first Municipio created during the American regime in the Philippines, on May 6, 1899, five days before the fateful "Sabang Battle".

During the Spanish era, Baliwag had 30 curates. Fr. Esteban Diez Hidalgo and Fr. Fausto Lopez served 40 and 24 years, respectively. Fr. Lopez had 6 children with a beautiful native, Mariquita Amparo: Soledad, Rita, Carmen, Dr. Joaquin Gonzalez, Francisco, the former Assemblyman Ricardo Lloret Gonzales, and Jose the eldest who was widely known as “Pepeng Mariquita". Spanish cura parroco, Fr. Ysidoro Prada served in Baliwag during the last decade of Spaniard regime.

Mariquita's family owned the biggest house in Baliwag which occupied a big block. Her son, Dr. Joaquin Gonzalez practiced medicine. In his lucrative profession, he treated patients in his clinic located inside their big ancestral mansion across the old Municipal Building traversing the National Highway. This landmark house was later used and became the Old Municipal Building (now the Museo ng Baliwag).

The Philippine-American civil and military authorities supervised the first municipal elections, having chosen Baliwag as the site of the first Philippine elections of May 7, 1899. The Filipinos gathered at the plaza of the St. Augustine Parish Church of Baliuag after the Holy Mass, and thereafter the officials were selected based on the qualifications for voters set by the Americans.

The first town Gobernadorcillo (1789 title) of Baliwag was Capitan Jose de Guzman. He was assisted by the Tribunal's teniente mayor (chief lieutenant), juez de ganadas (judge of the cattle), juez de sementeras (judge of the field) and juez de policia (judge of the police).

During the Spanish era, the 1893 Maura Law, the title of Gobernadorcillo became "capitan municipal" and that of each juez to teniente. From Baliwag's independence from Quingua, now Plaridel, Bulacan to 1898, 49 served as capitan, 13 alcalde and 92 as Gobernadorcillo. Felix de Lara (1782) and Agustin de Castro (1789) were the 1st alcalde and Gobernadorcillo, respectively. Municipal President Fernando Enrile, in 1908 honored some of these officials, even naming some of Baliwag calles in their honor, later. But all these political officials remained under the thumbs and the habito, of the autocratic Augustinian friars, the Baliuag Kura Parokos.

Principalias or town castles, in the Hispanization of Baliwag, became the home of the rich and famous, who sported the titles of Don or Capitan (shrewd, hard-bargaining businessman, the highly successful professionals and even the parvenus, nouveaux riche).

The local government of Baliwag used as first Municipio under the American regime (History of the Philippines (1898–1946)) the Mariano Yoyongko (Gobernadorcillo in 1885) Principalia in Poblacion (now a part of the market site), which it bought from Yoyongko.

On September 15, 1915, Baliwag municipality bought the heritage mansion and lot of Dr. Joaquin Gonzalez (politician). The Gonzalez old mansion served as Lumang Munisipyo (the Old Municipio or Town Hall Building, as seat of the local government) for 65 years.

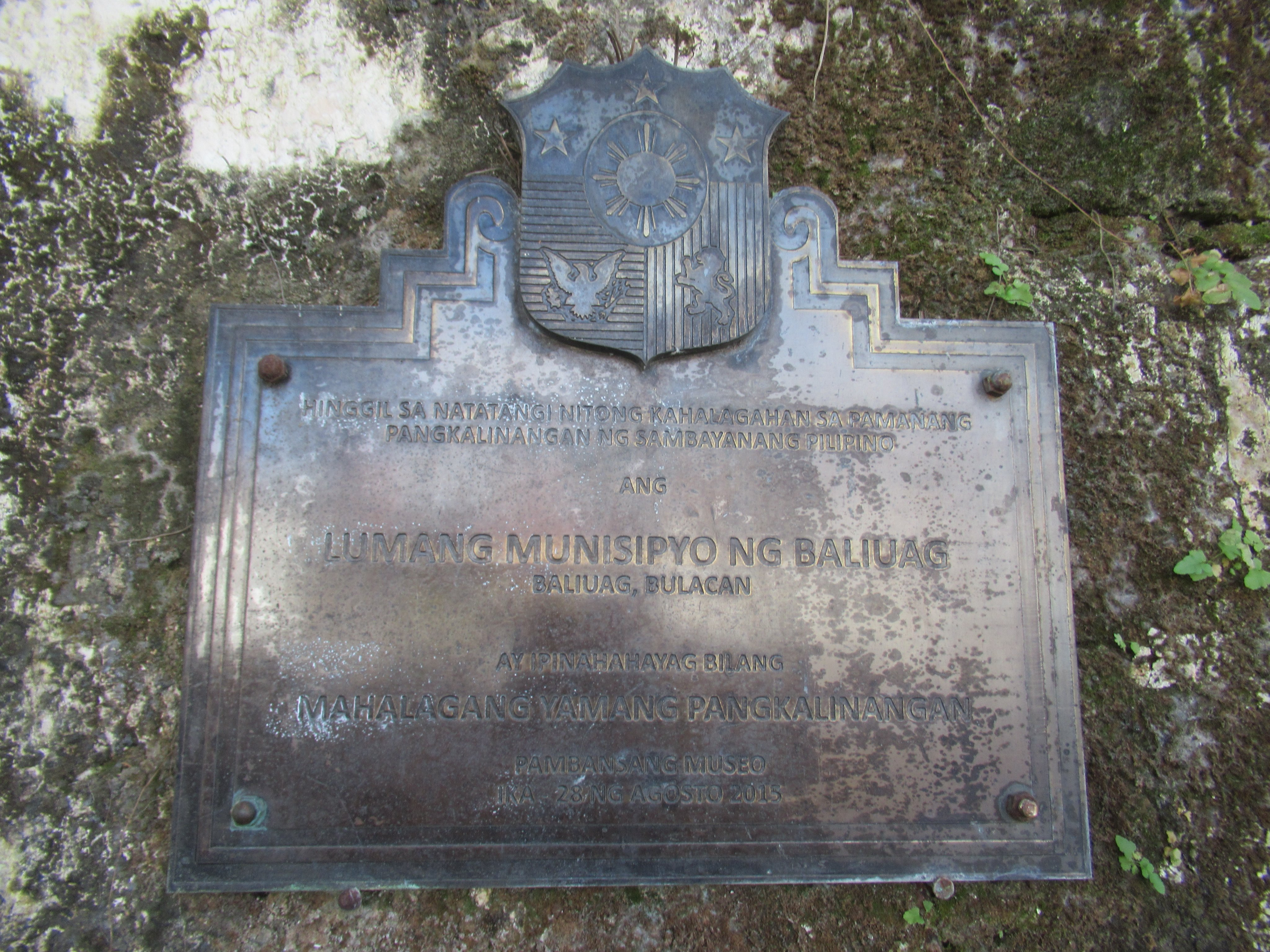
Lumang Municipio marker

On August 28, 2015, the National Museum of the Philippines by its Historical Marker for the Old Municipio of Baliuag, declared it as one of the Important Cultural Properties of the Philippines, under Sec. 5 of R.A. No. 10066, National Cultural Heritage Act of 2009.

== Renovation and inauguration ==
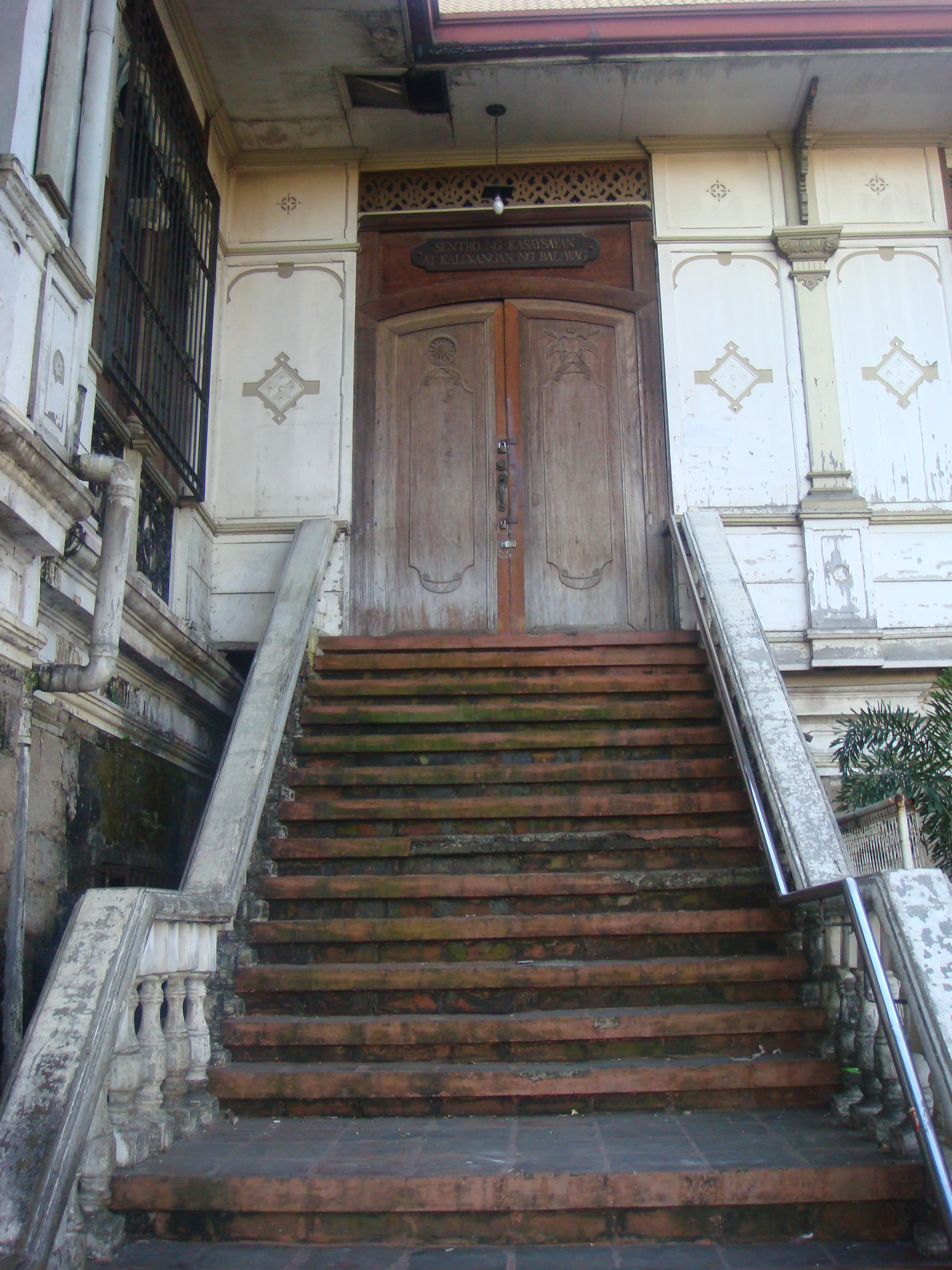
Baliuag Museo's stairs

In 1971, Baliwag Mayor Florentino Vergel de Dios constructed a new municipal building. Accordingly, the Baliwag Tourism Council and Baliwag Historical Society's Mr. Rolando E. Villacorta suggested the conversion of the historic house into a Library-Museum.

In 1993, Baliwag Alkalde Carling Trinidad, Cong. Pedro Pancho with the assistance of Guillermina T. Gabor started the reconstruction of the Gonzalez mansion.

Mayor Rolando Salvador, on August 9, 1998, accepted the renovate Building as part of municipal government property. Baliwag Tourism Council, Gemma Cruz-Araneta (Secretary of the Department of Tourism) and Bulacan Governor Josefina M. dela Cruz were present at the formal inauguration of the Library-Museum turnover to the LGU of Baliwag.

=== Description ===
The contemporary Baliwag's Museo houses on its ground floor the Baliwag community affairs and tourism office.

On the second floor of the Museo is the Silid-Aklatang Francisco Guerrero Library-Museum which has several Bulwagan. The First local election in the Philippines took place on May 6, 1899, with the election of Francisco Guerrero, the first Baliwag municipal president who held office in the house of Dr. Joaquin Gonzales, the Old Municipio, now the Museo ng Baliwag.

Aside from the Bulwagang Guerrero are: Mariano Ponce, Bert Marcelo, Alfonso Enrile (father of Juan Ponce Enrile), Roman C. Carreon, sculptor and artist and "Pepita" - Josefa Tiongson y Lara Bulwagan (JOCELYNANG BALIUAG, Kundiman). The slain Mayor Servando "Bandong" Santos' gun, memorabilia is at the side of the dining and reception halls.

== Image gallery ==
=== Exterior ===
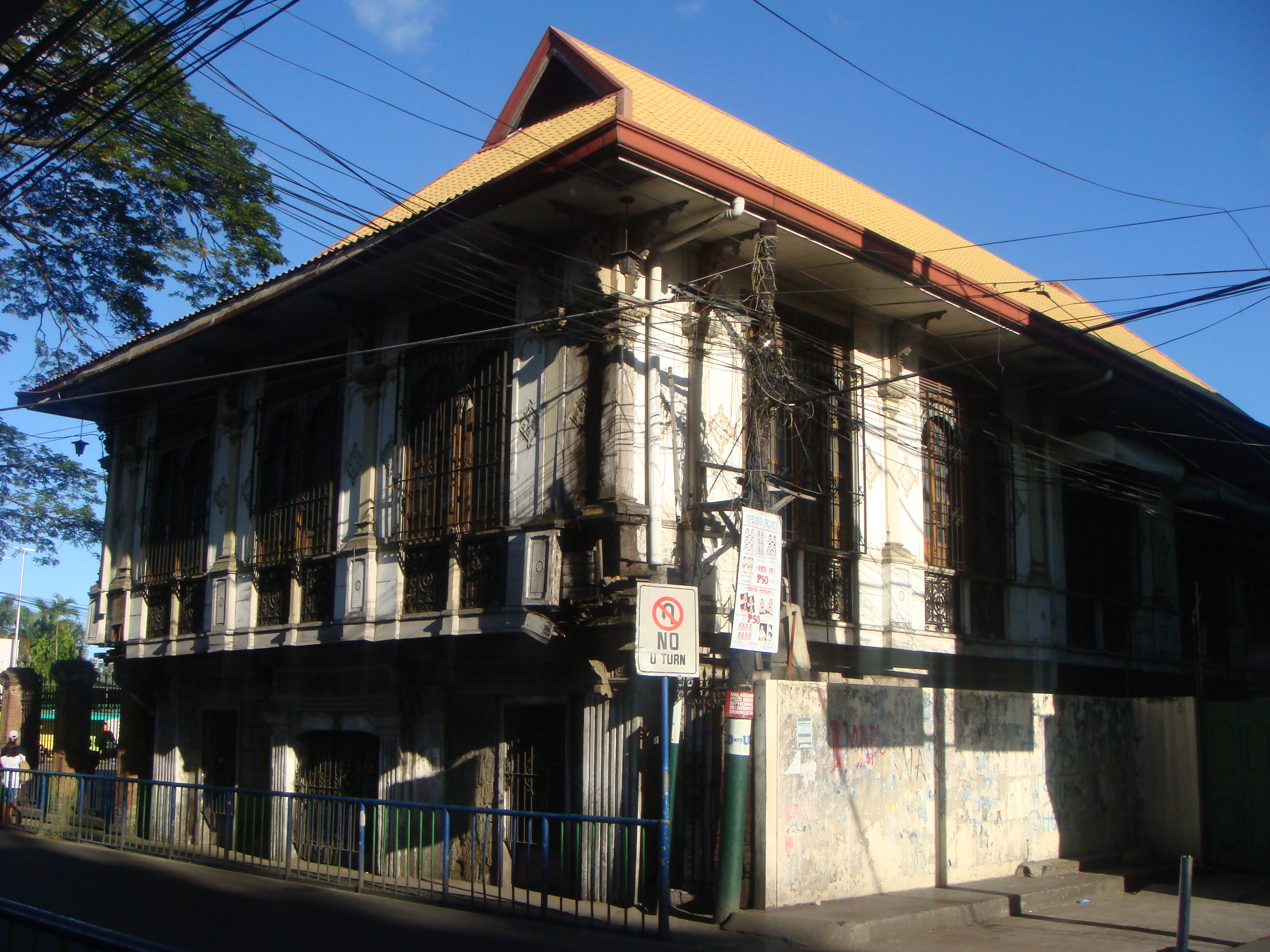
The century-old Sentro ng Kalinangan at Kasaysayan, Baliwag, Bulacan Museum (Old Municipio)

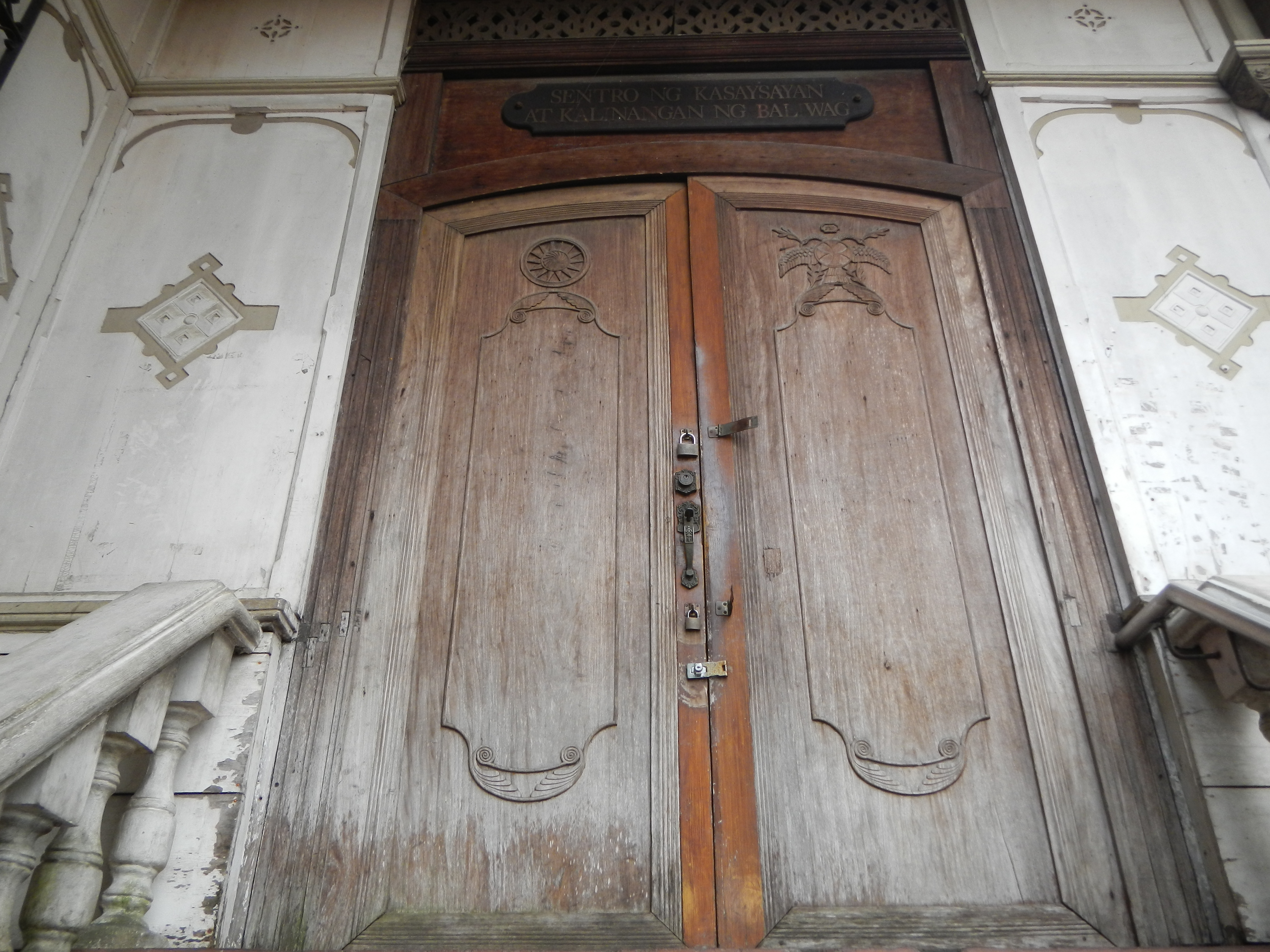
Main door ("Sentro ng Kasaysayan at Kalinangan ng Baliwag")

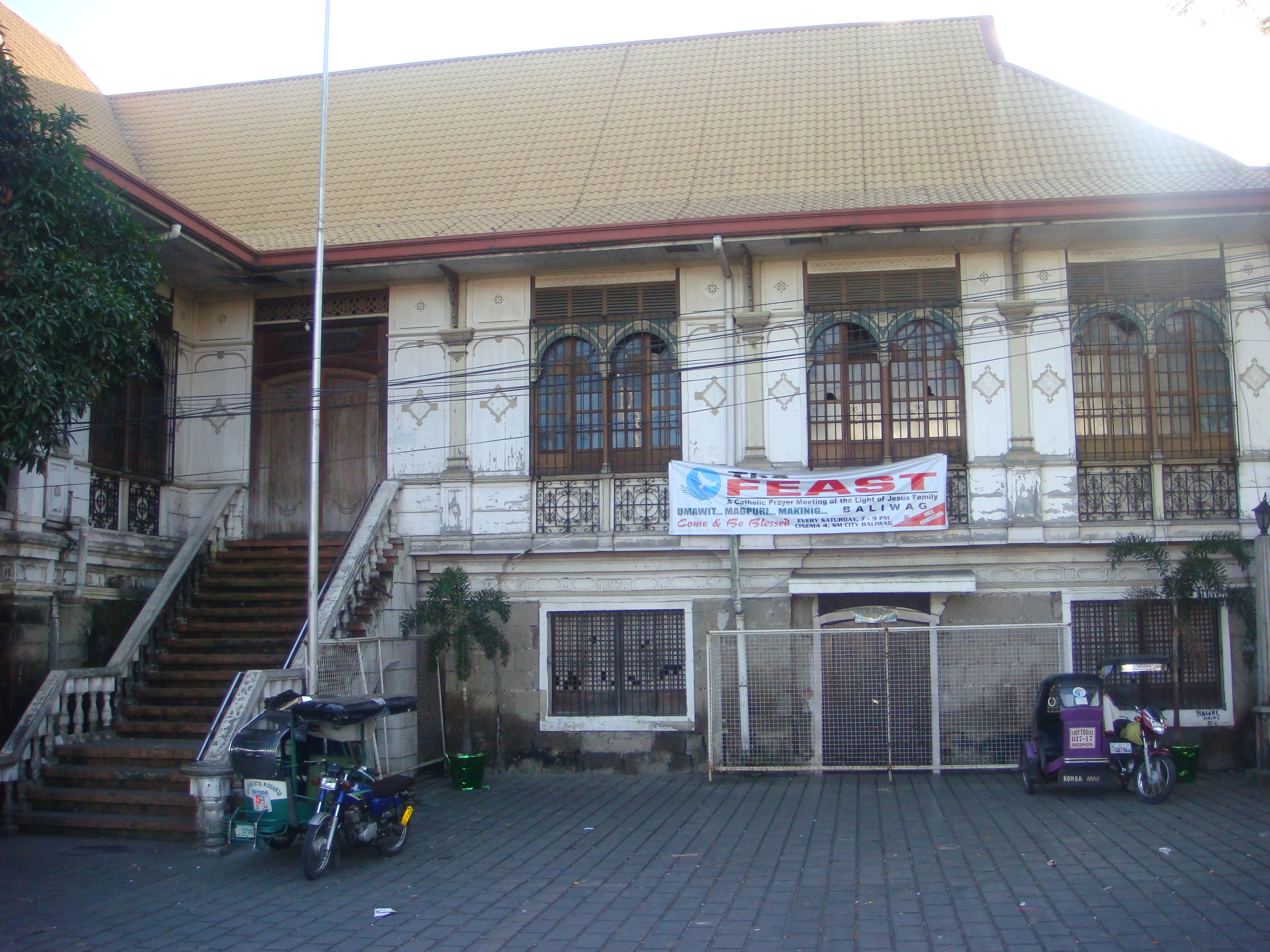
Facade

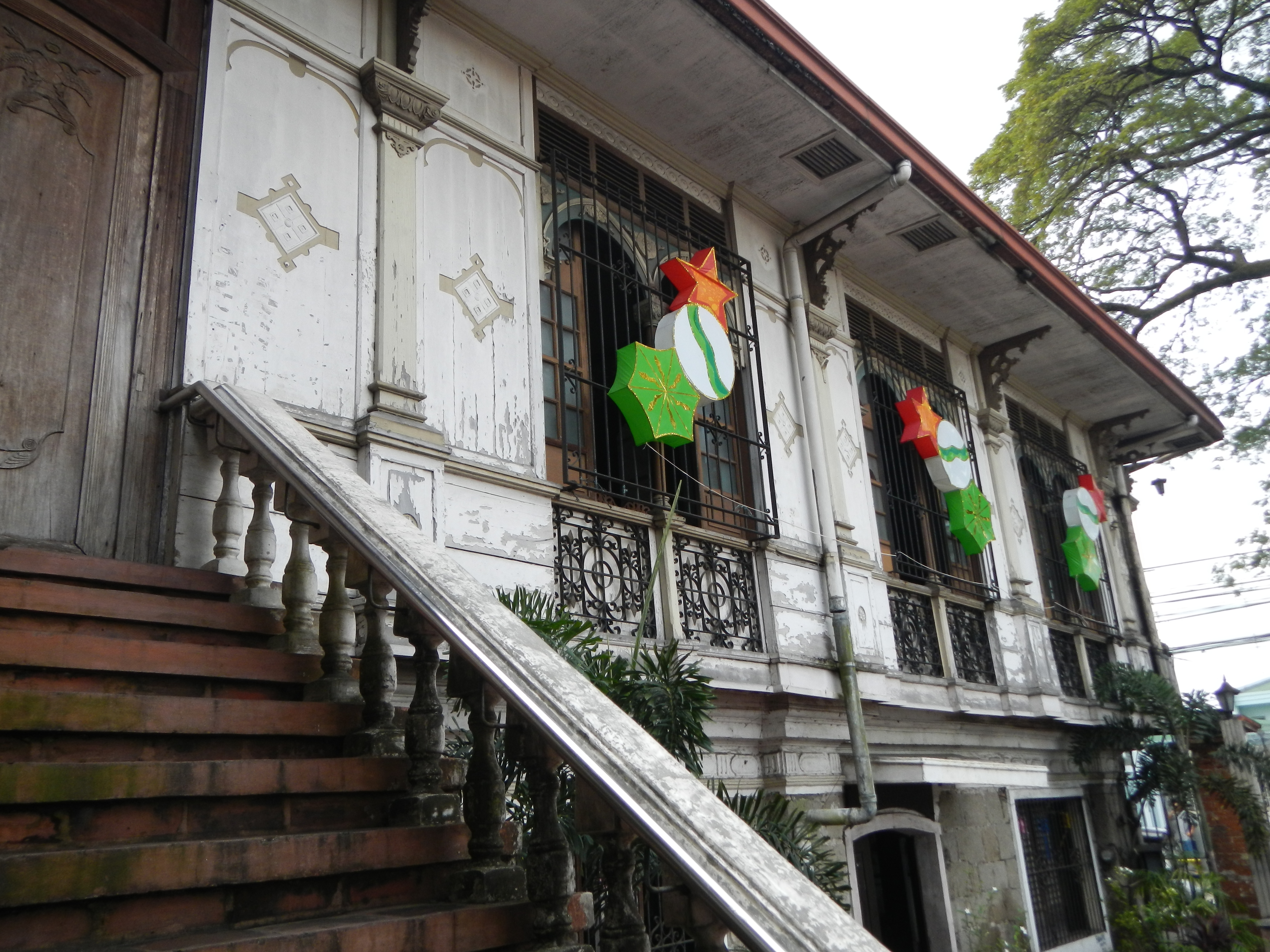
Right facade

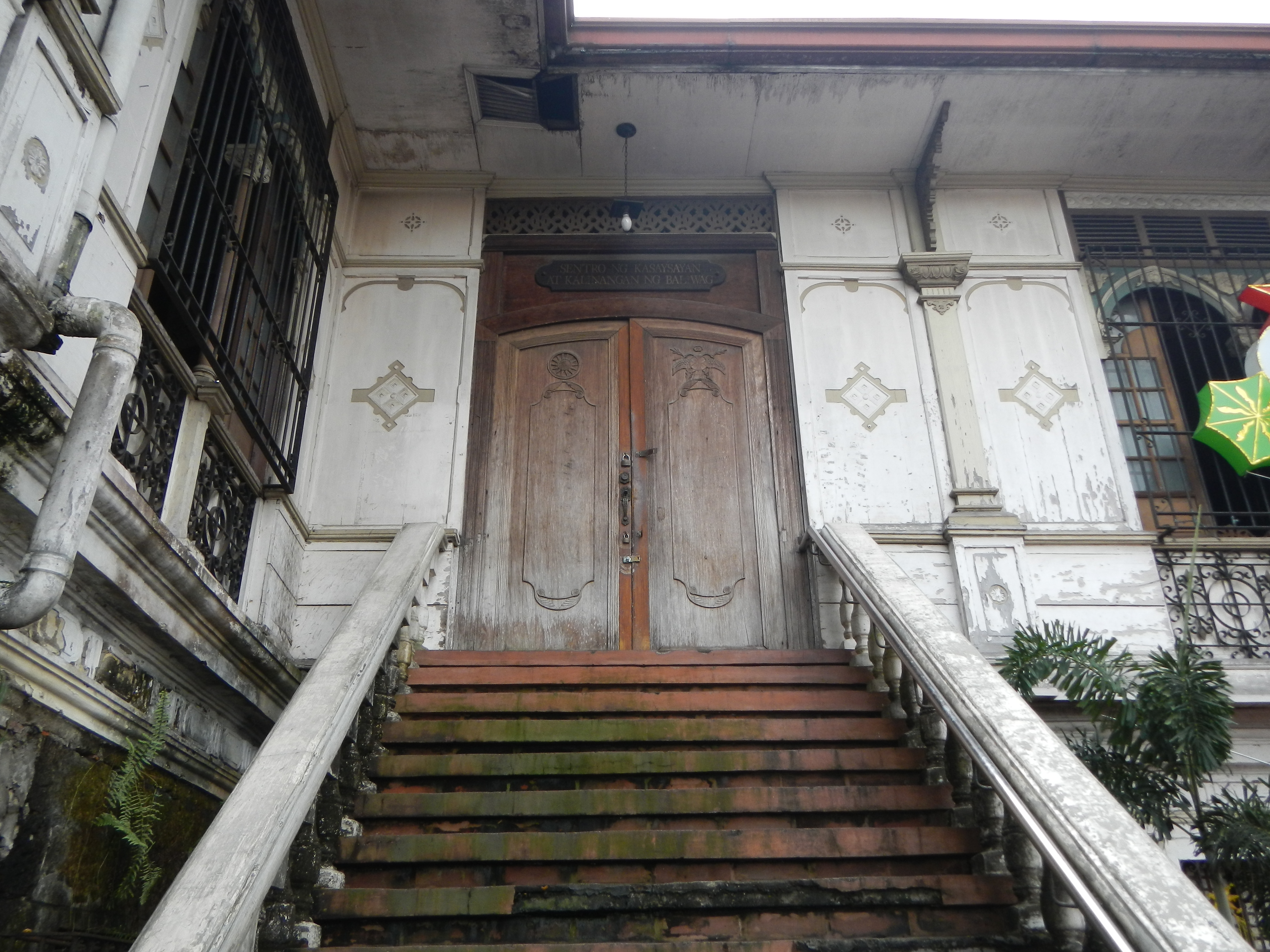
The majestic stairs of the main door

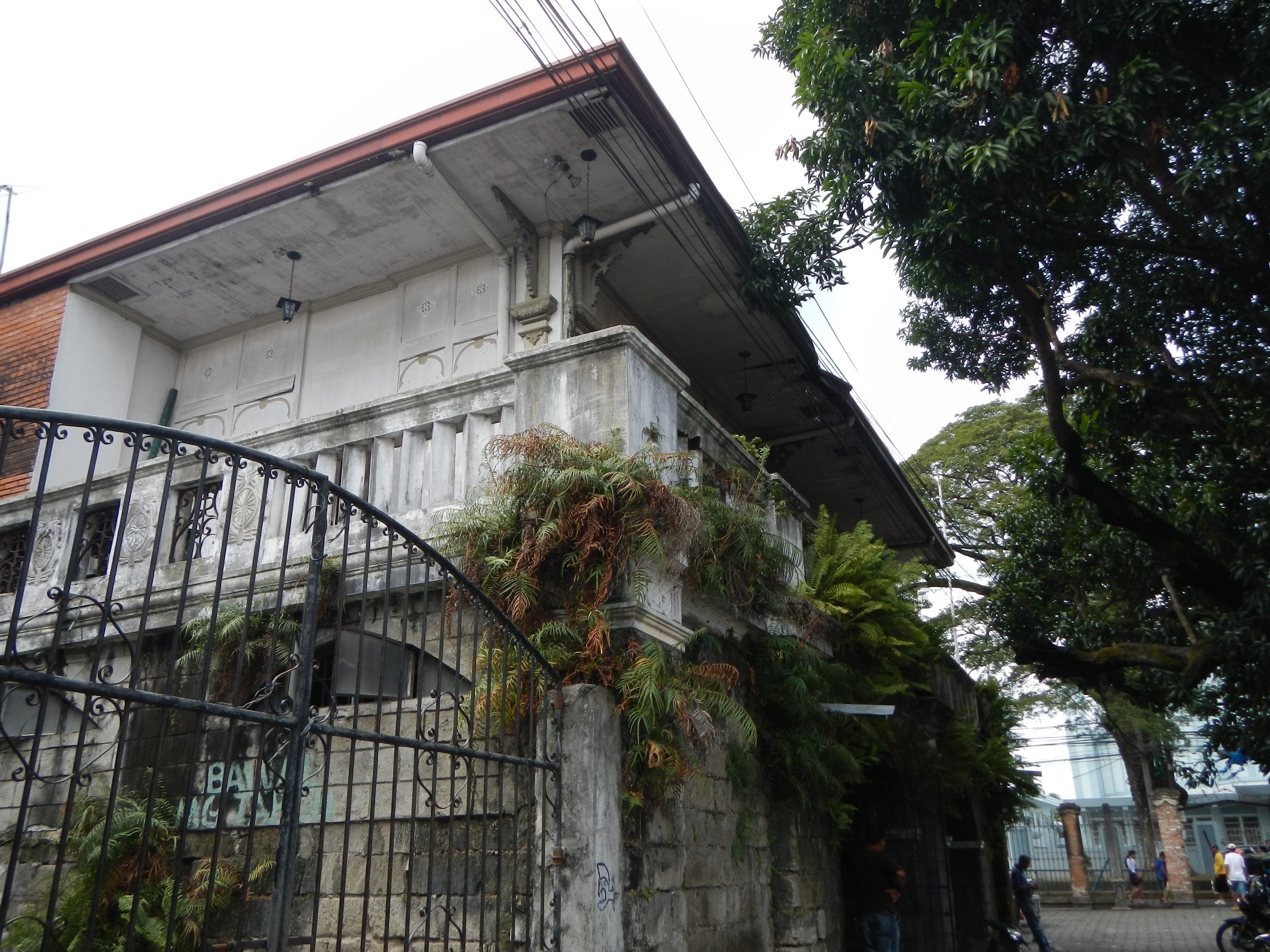
Rear facade

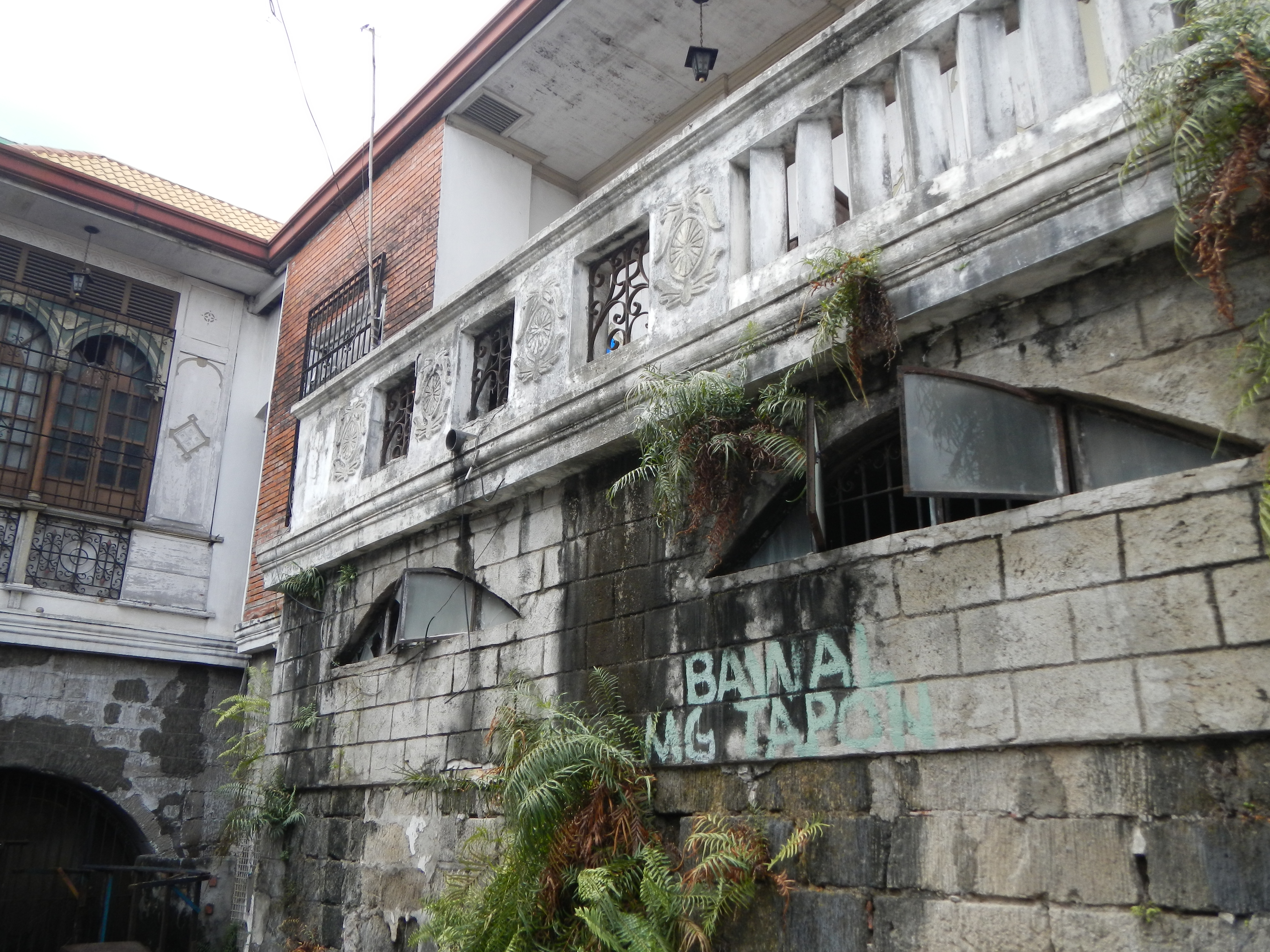
Side facade

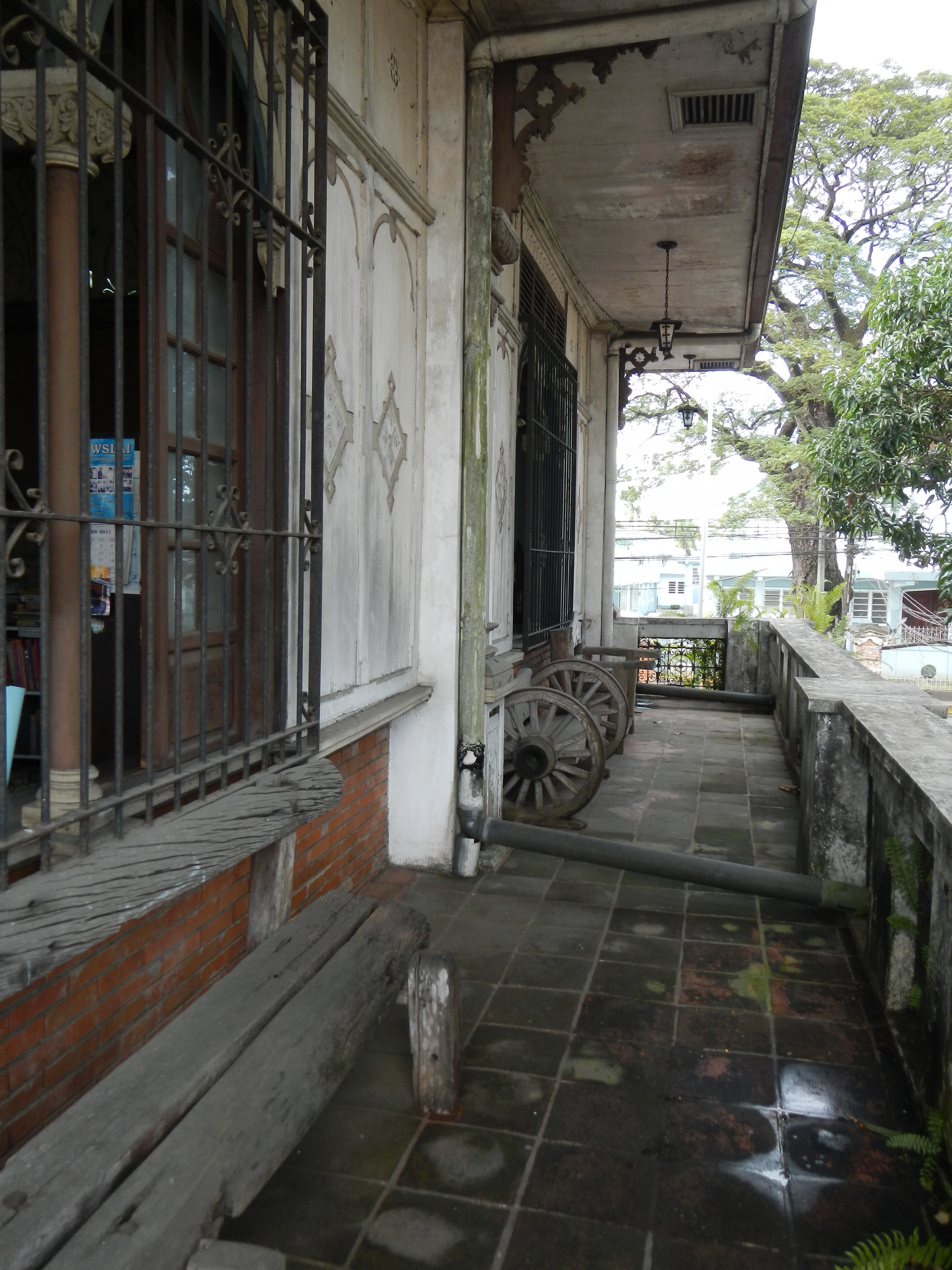
Side view of the terrace

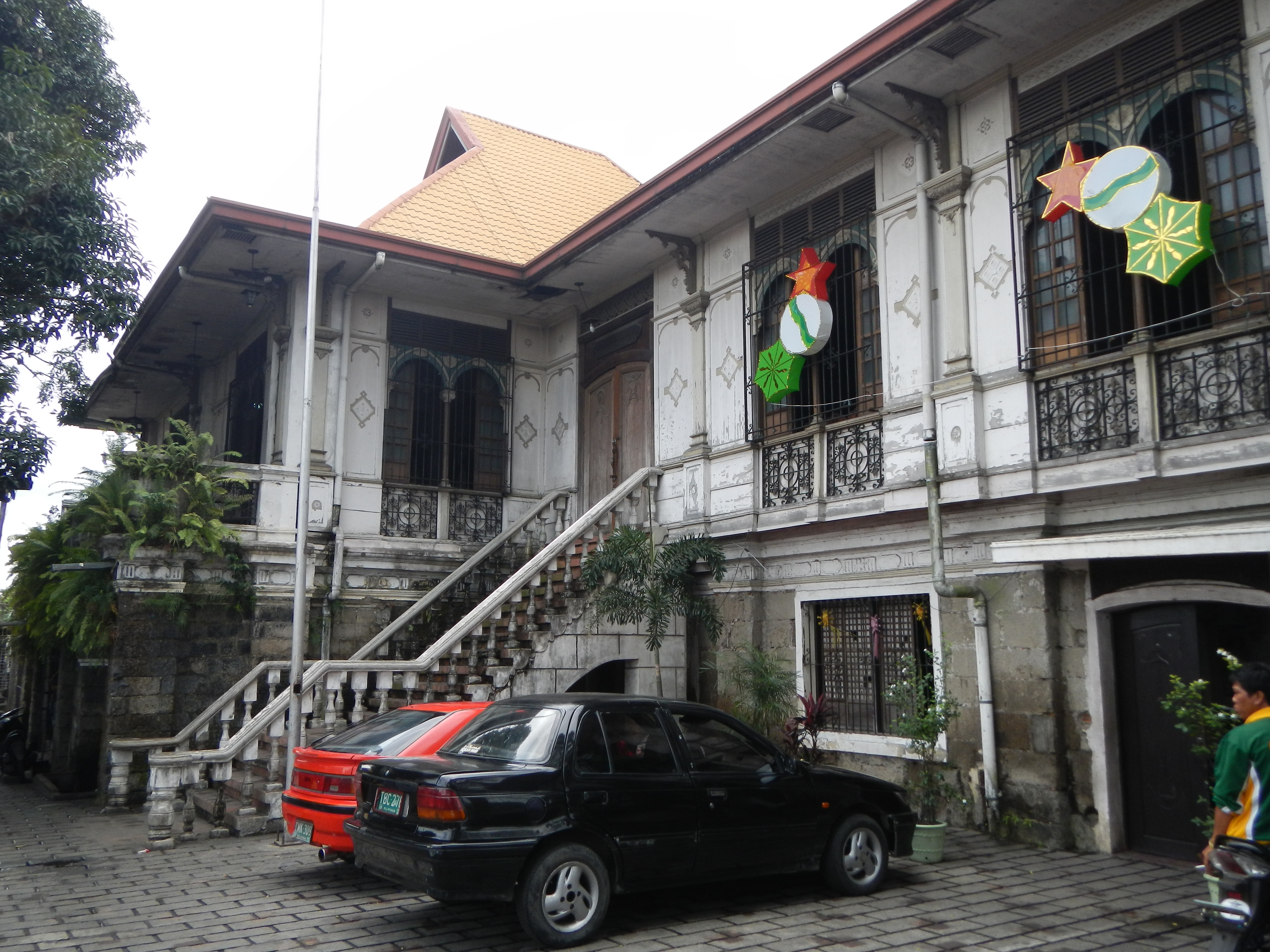
Facade of the Baliwag Museum (Old Presidencia or Municipio)

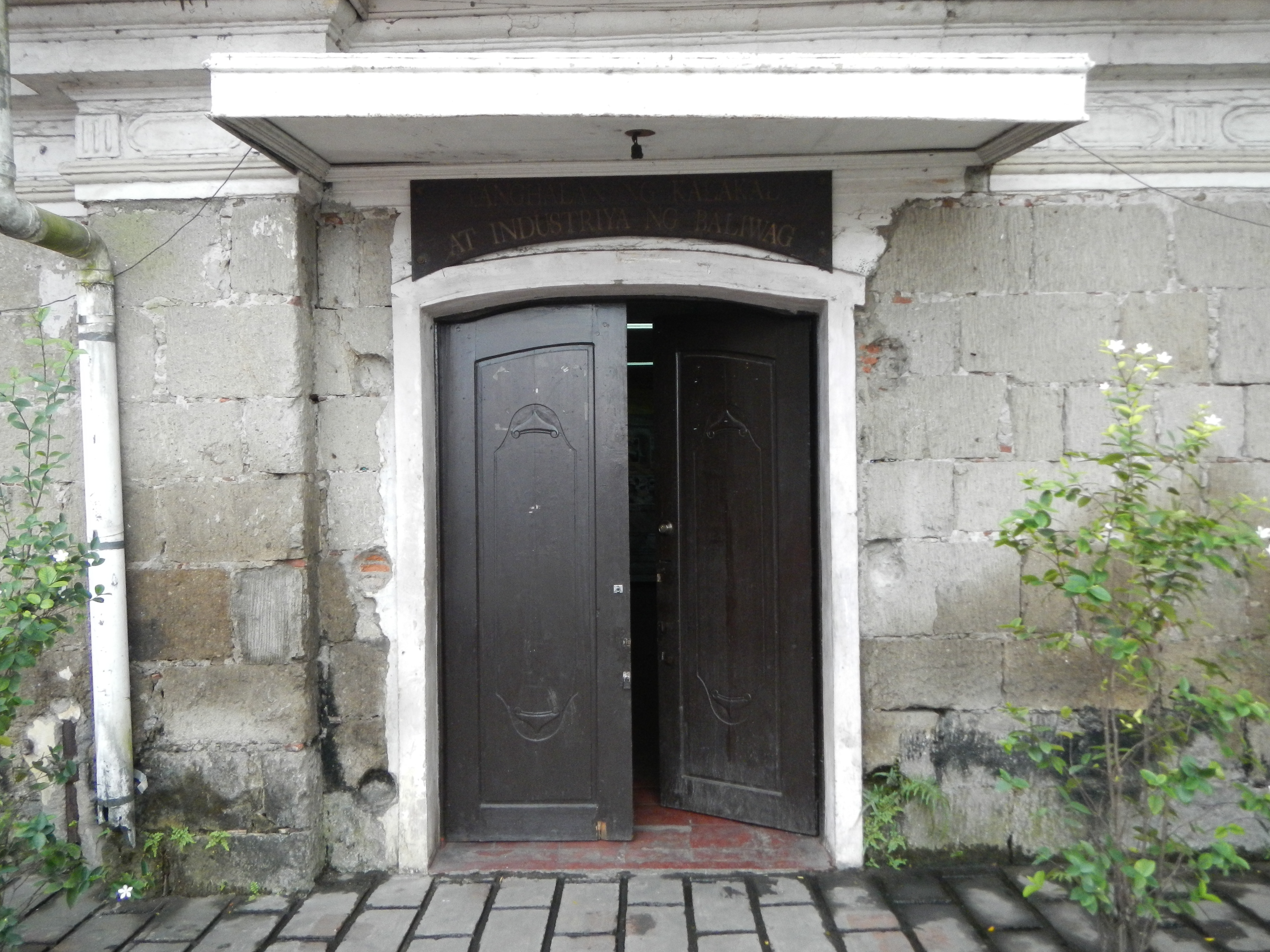
Door of the Tourism Office, Museum ground floor

=== Interior ===
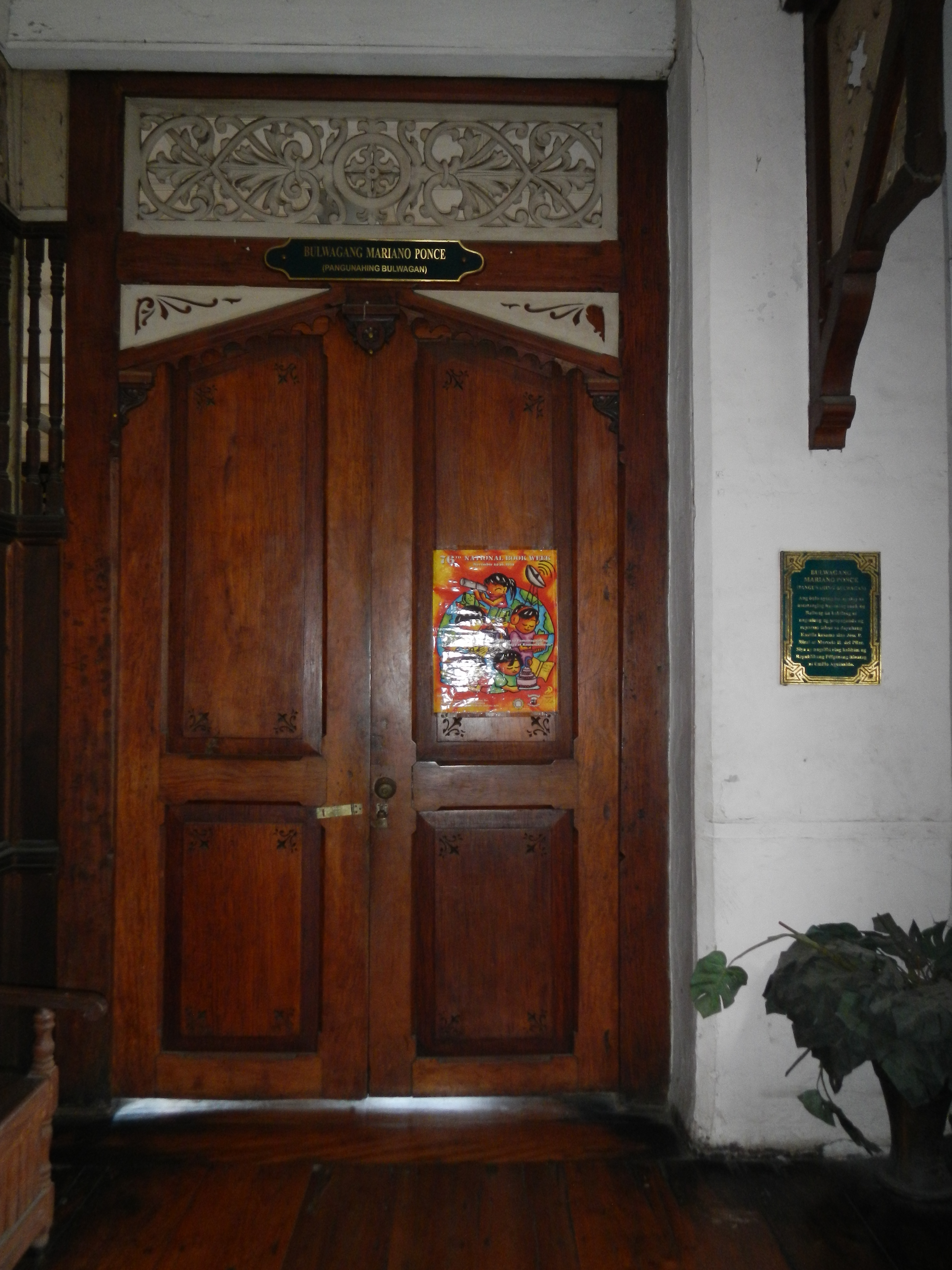
Bulwagang Mariano Ponce

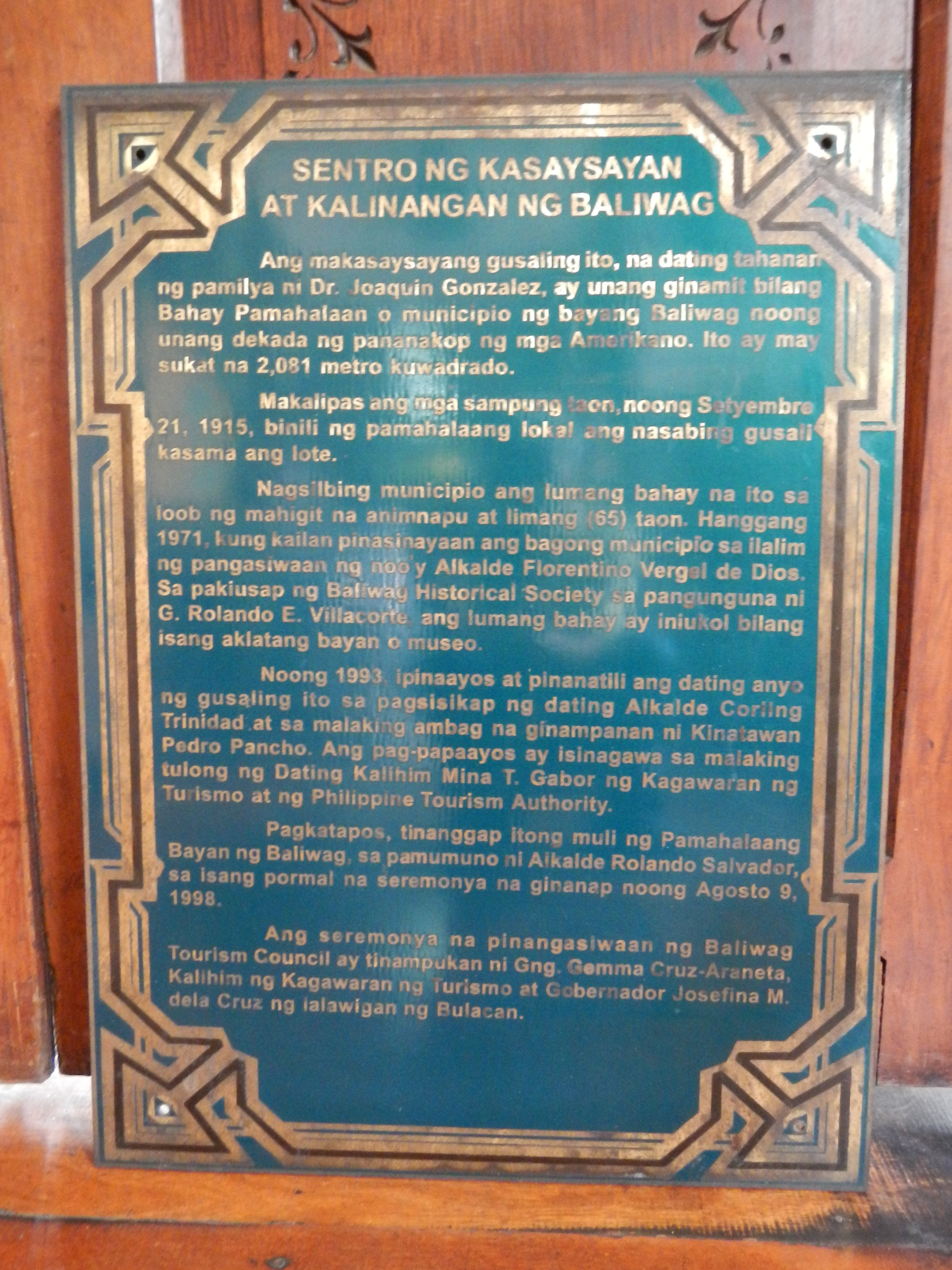
The Marker, Ancestral House of Joaquin Gonzalez (politician)-Lopez

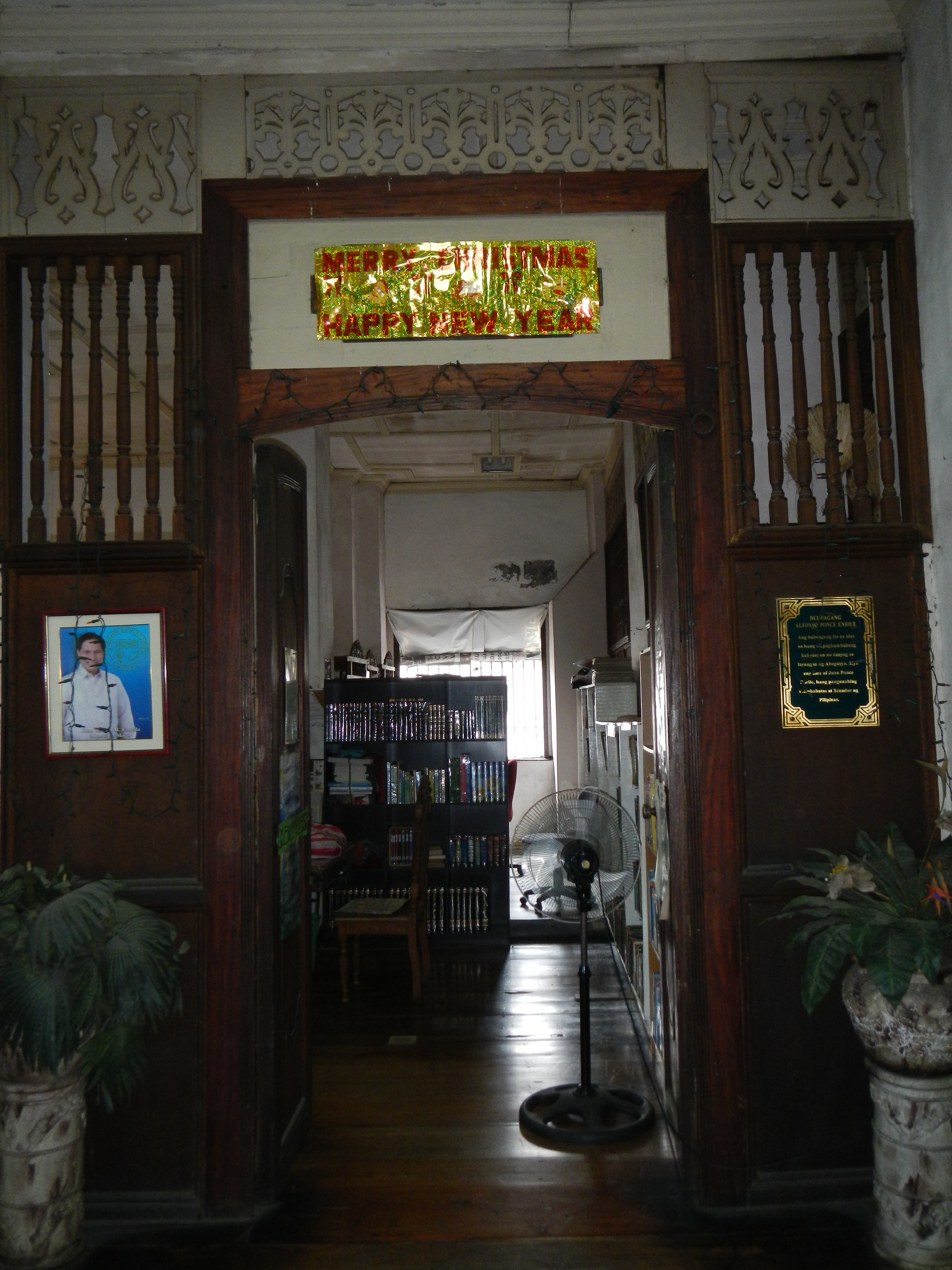
The Library room (Alfonso Enrile)

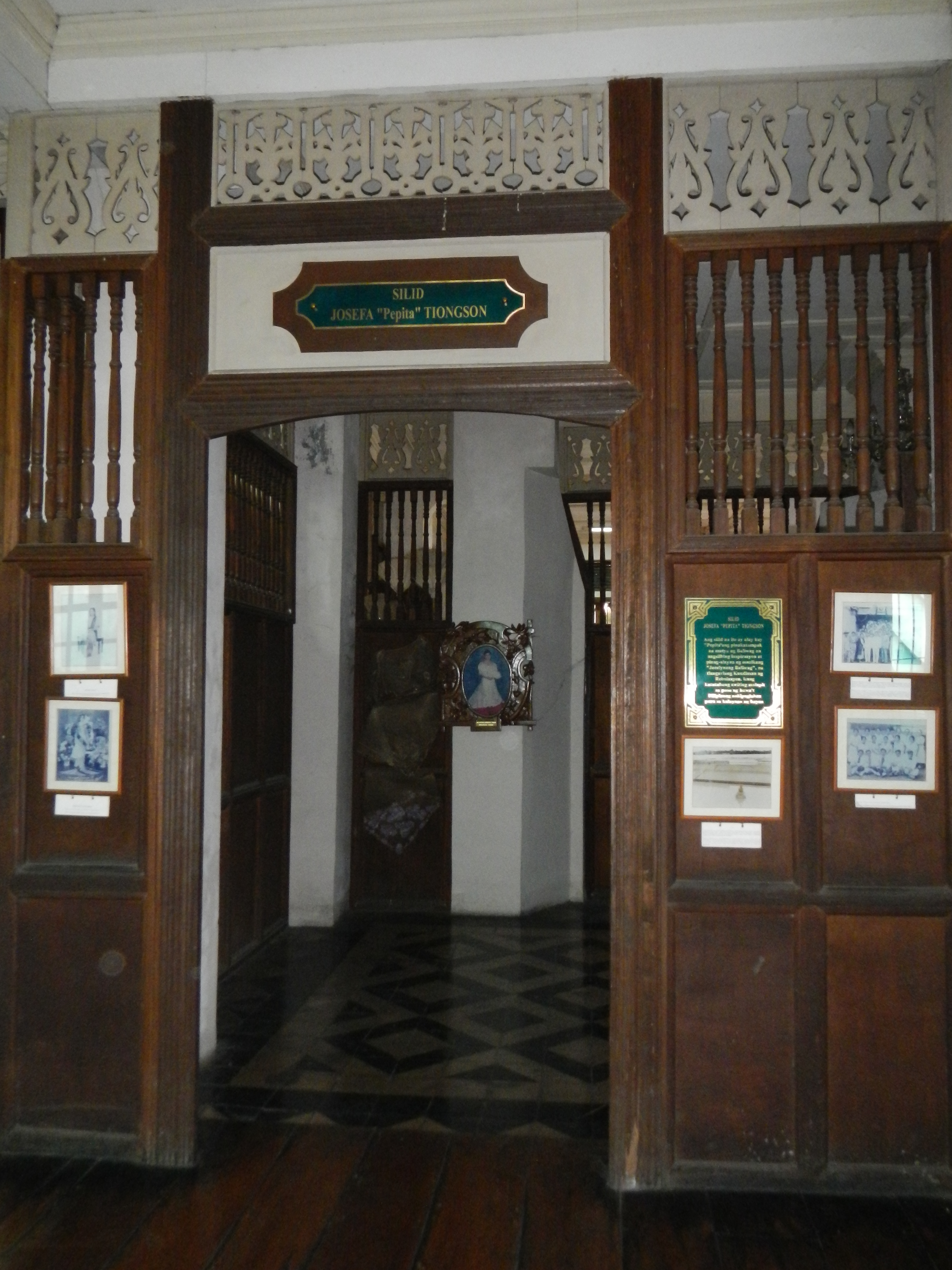
"Pepita" - Josefa Tiongson y Lara Bulwagan (JOCELYNANG BALIUAG, Kundiman)

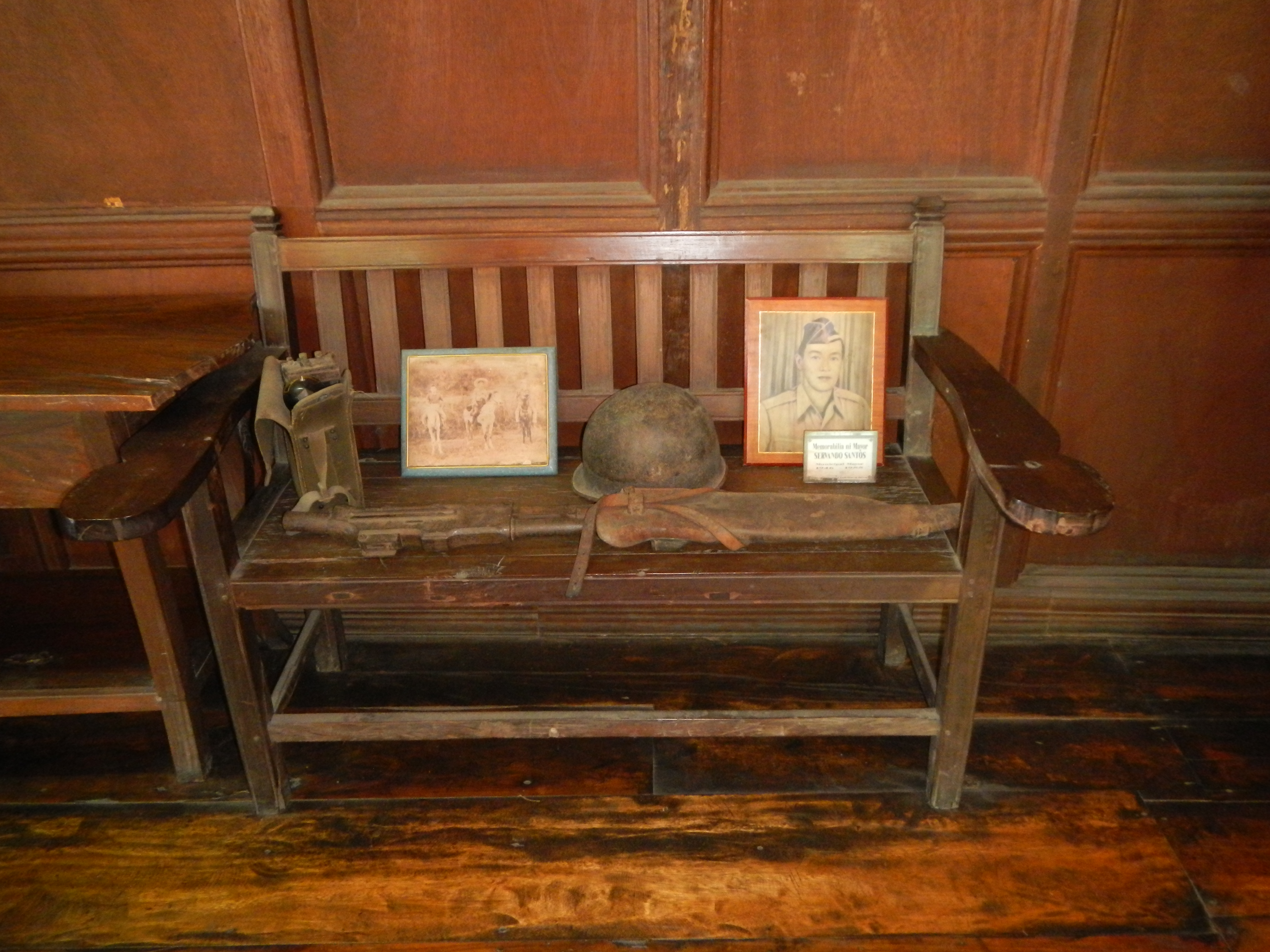
Slain Mayor Servando "Bandong" Santos' gun, memorabilia

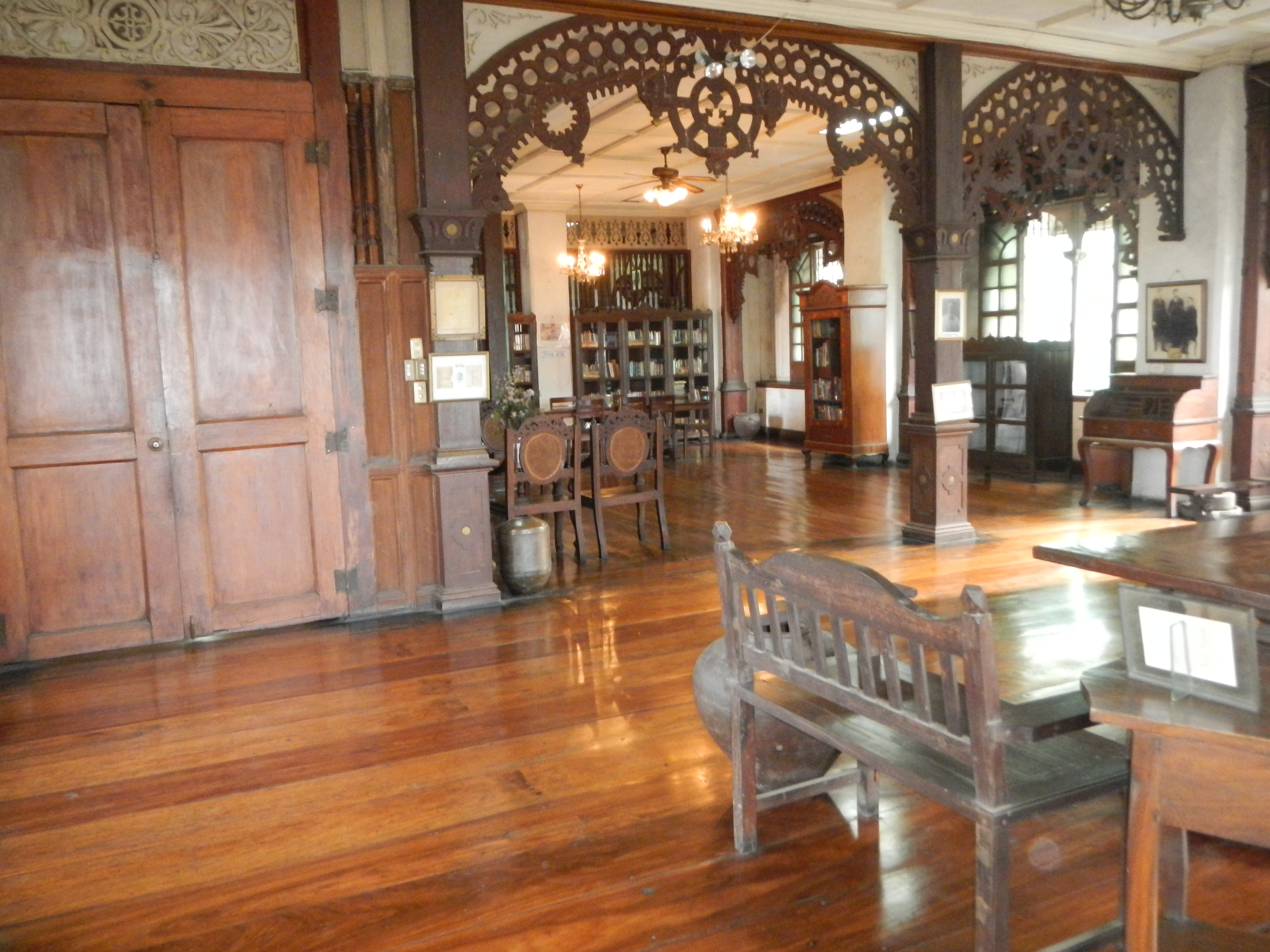
Sala

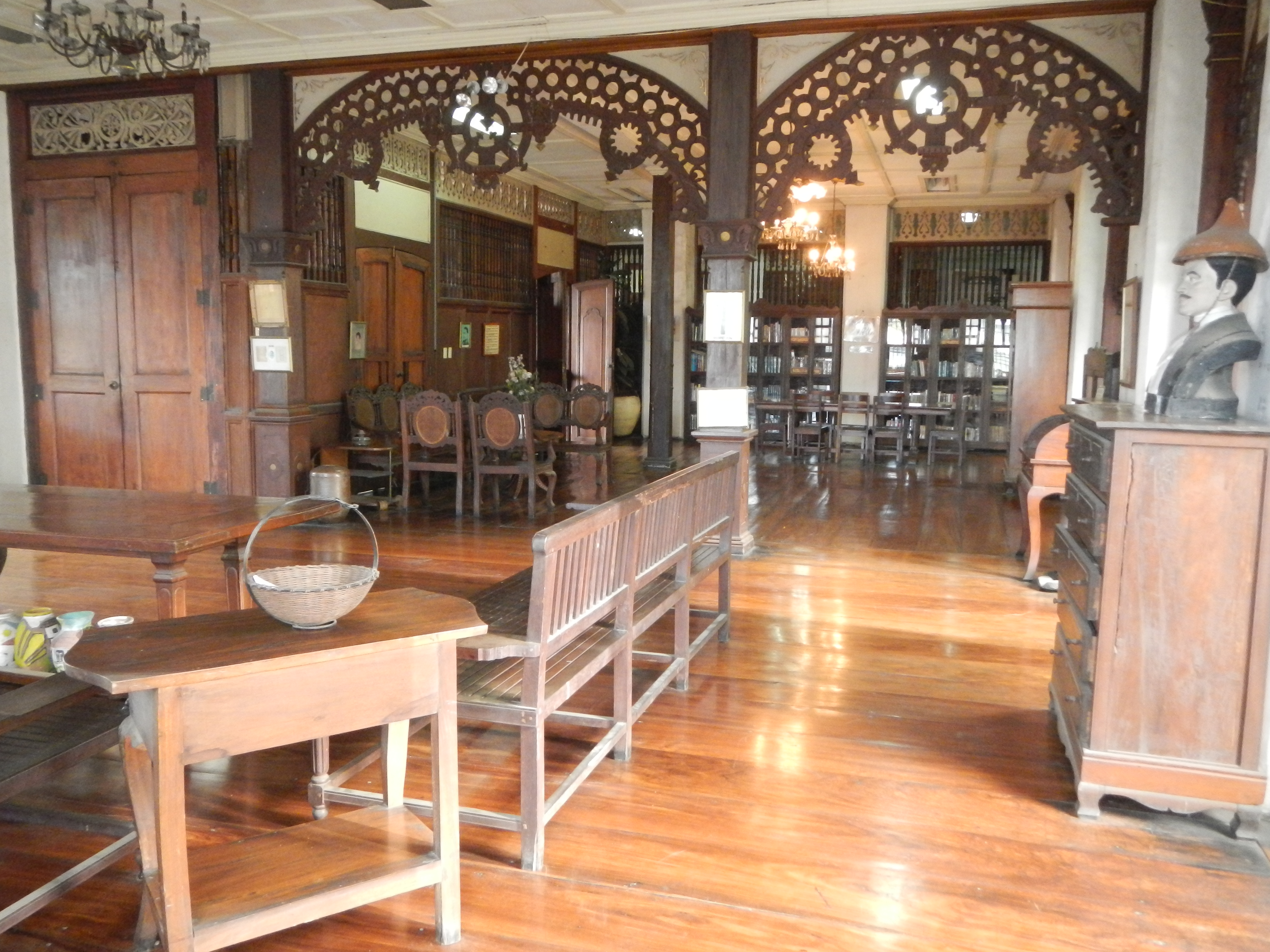
Dining

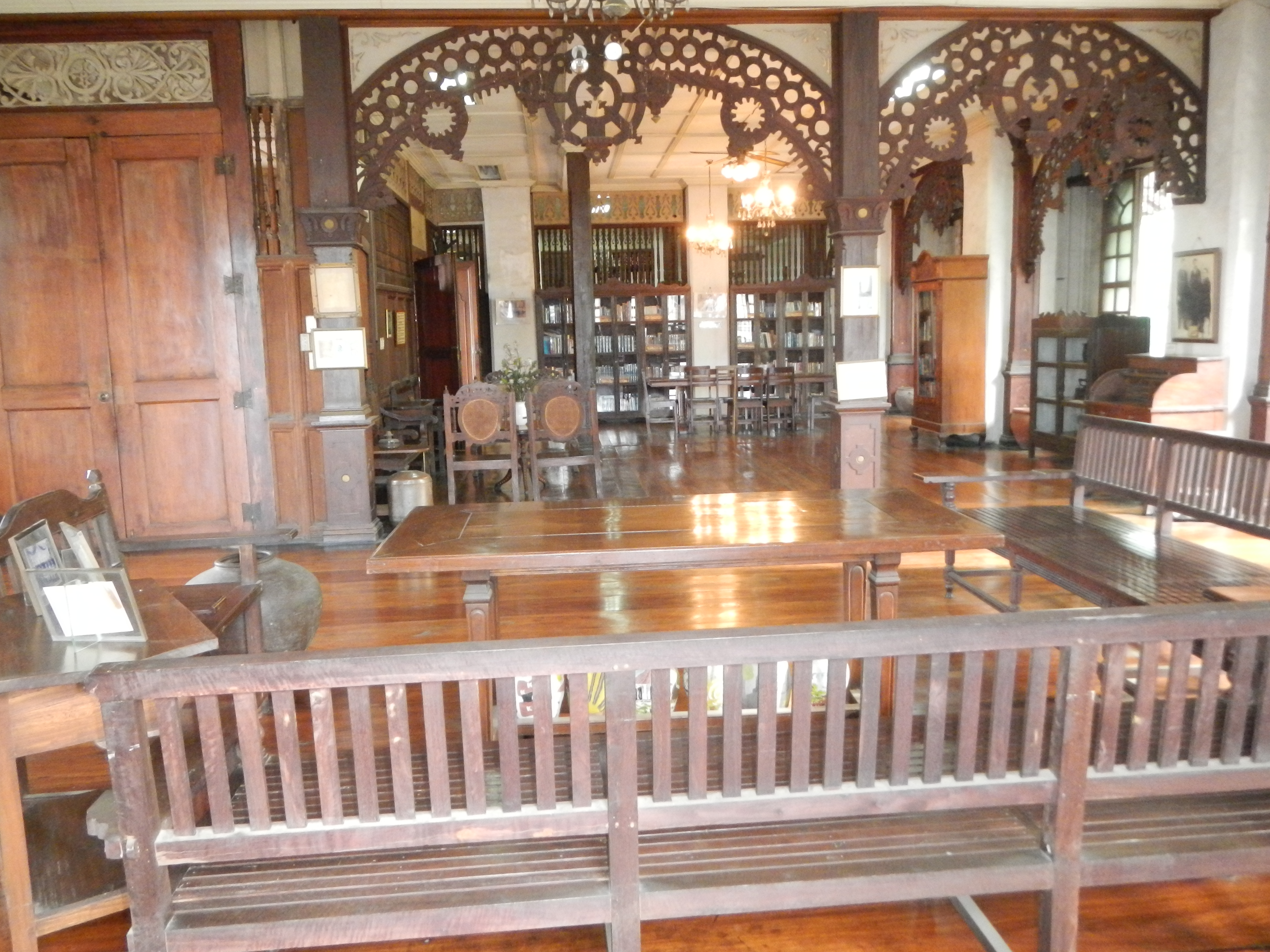
Sala, dining and reception halls

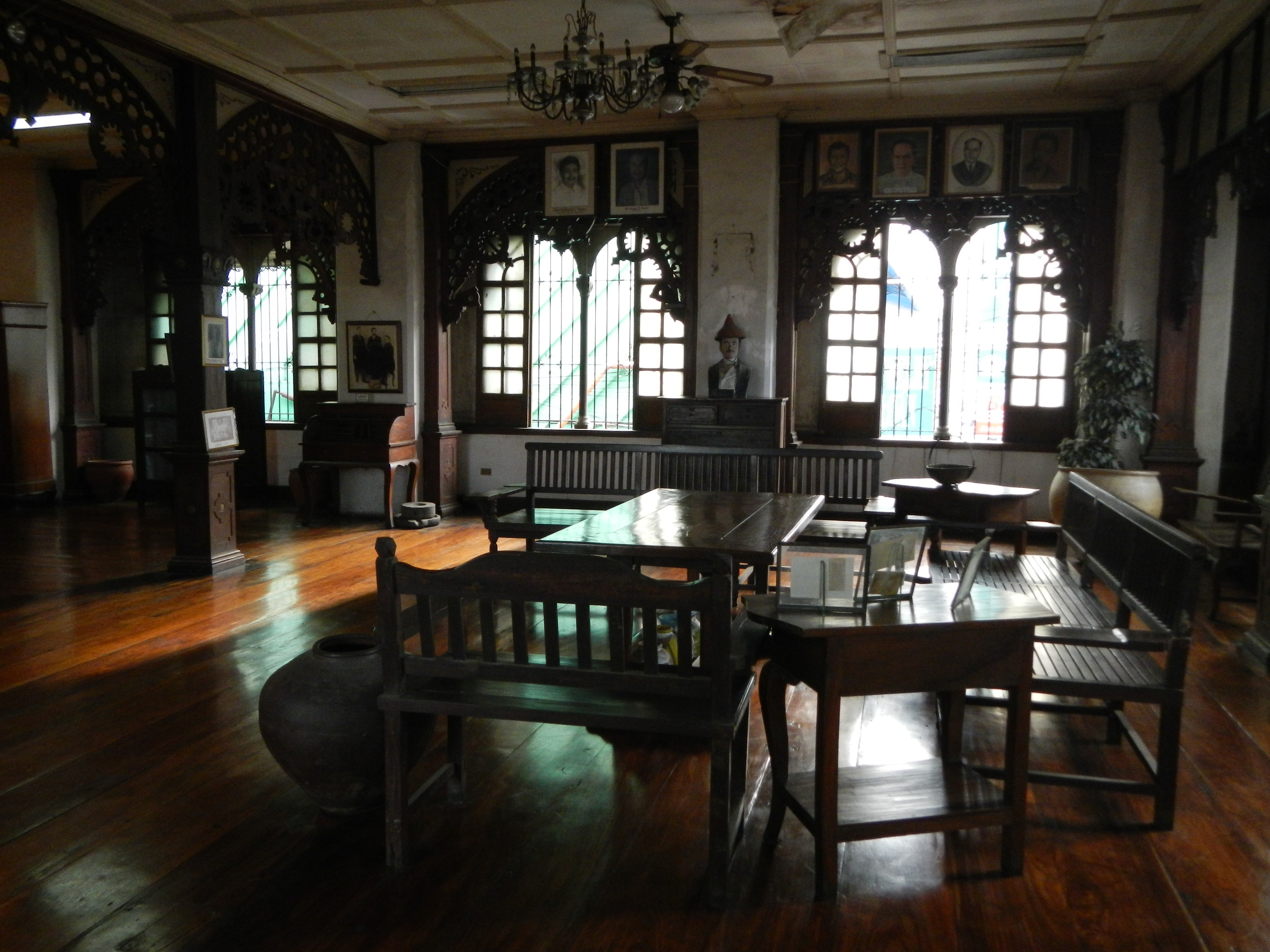
Sala, dining and reception halls

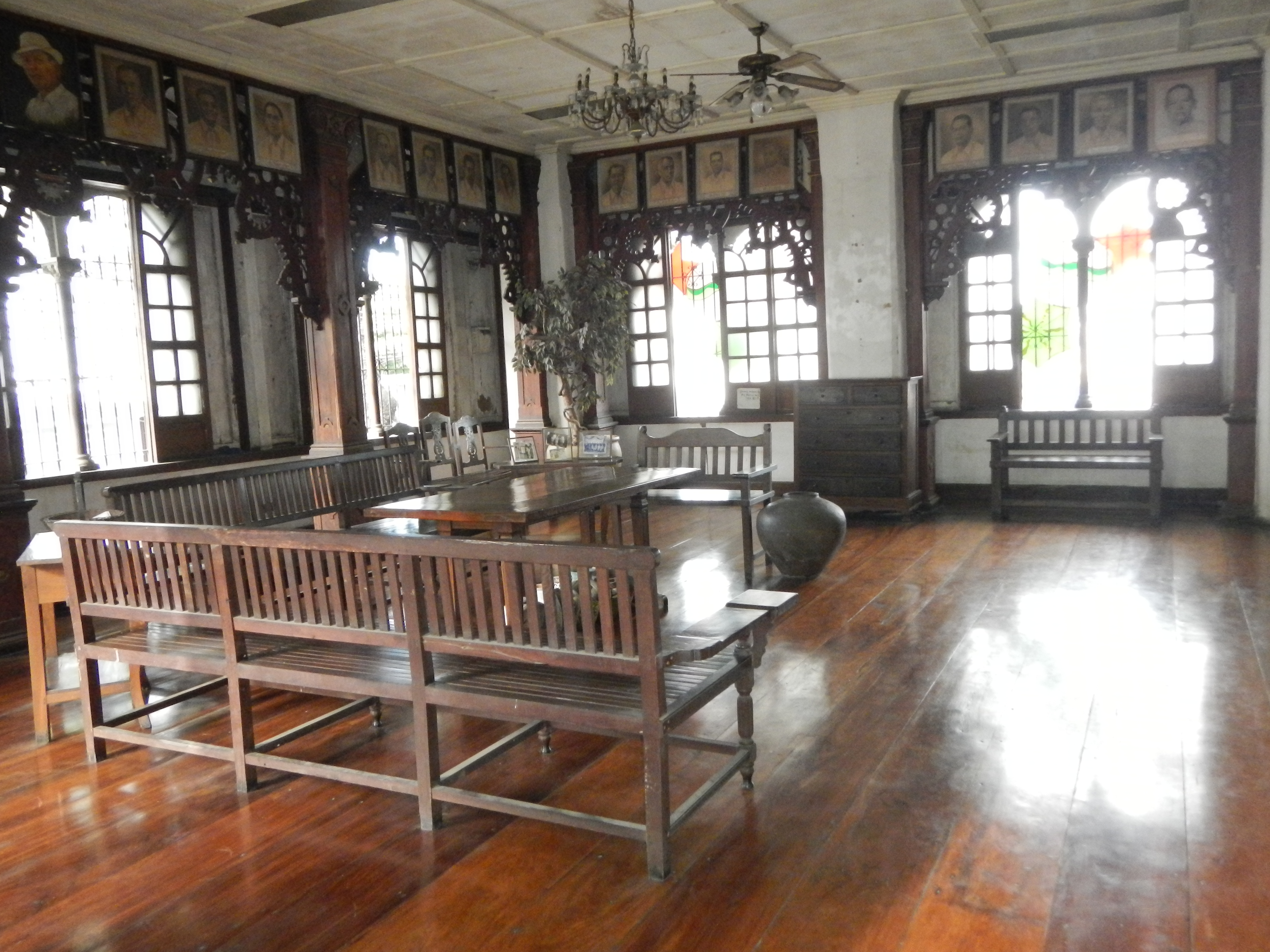
Sala, dining and reception halls

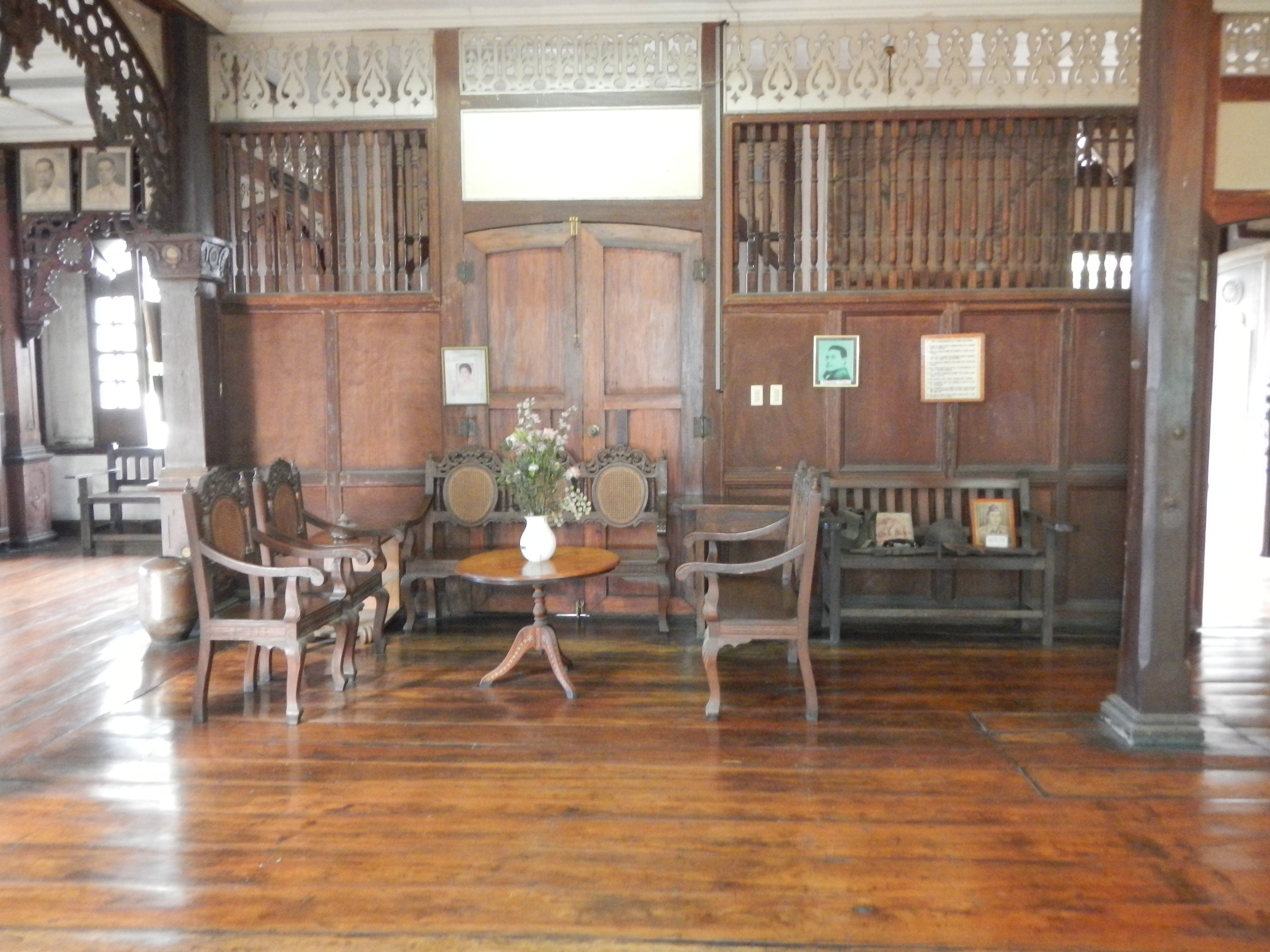
Sala, dining and reception halls

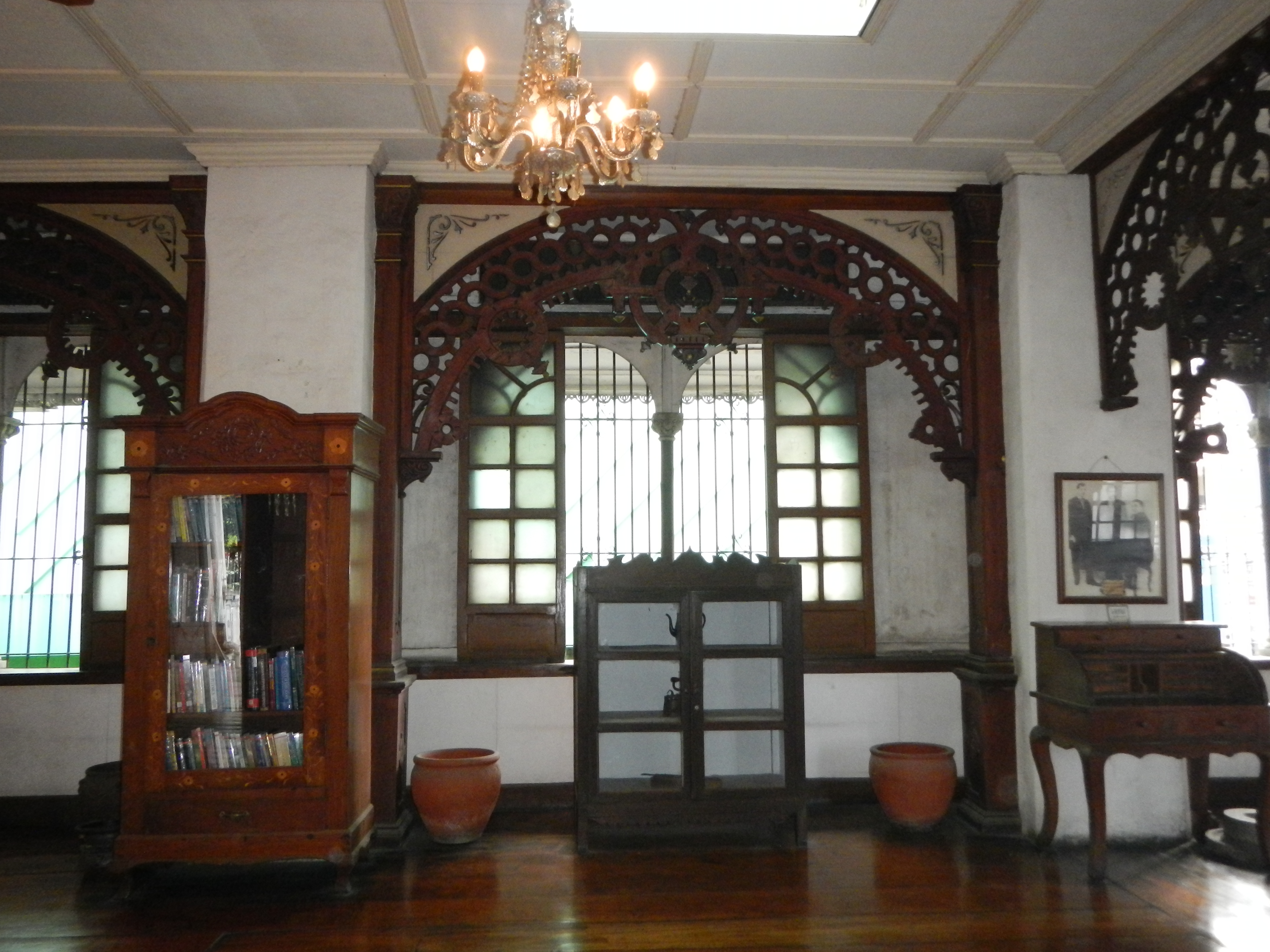
Sala, dining and reception halls

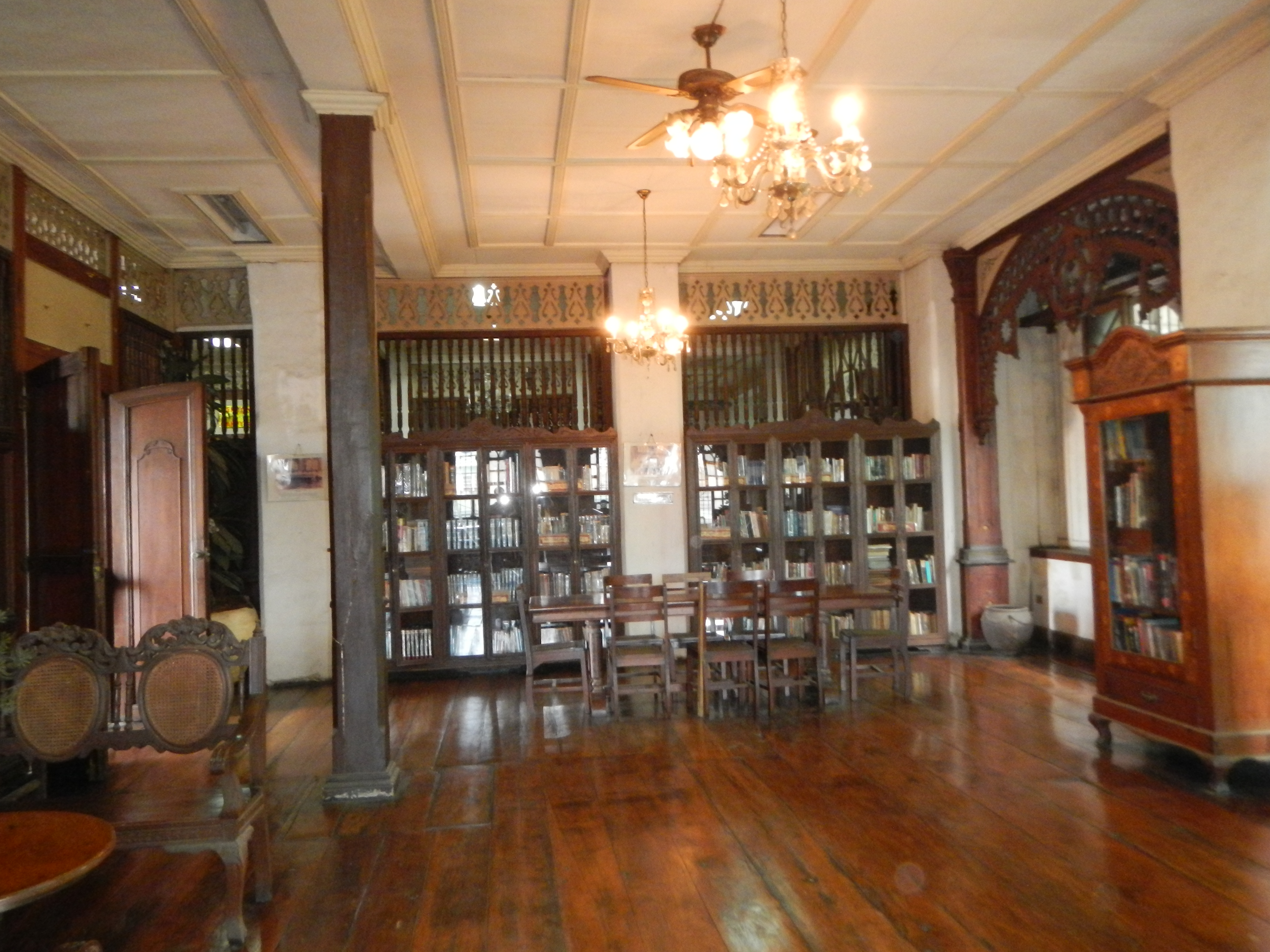
Sala, dining and reception halls

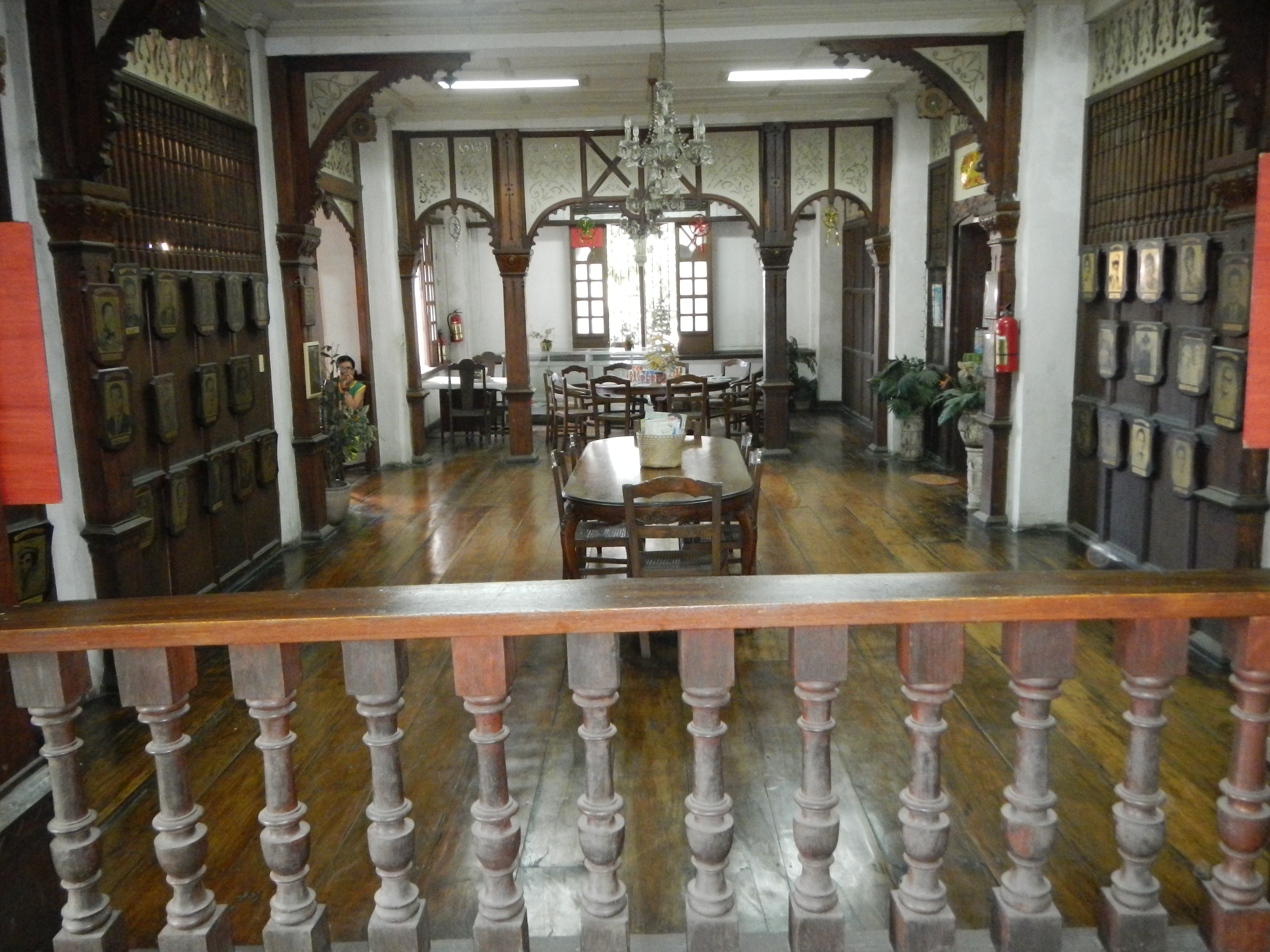
Interior

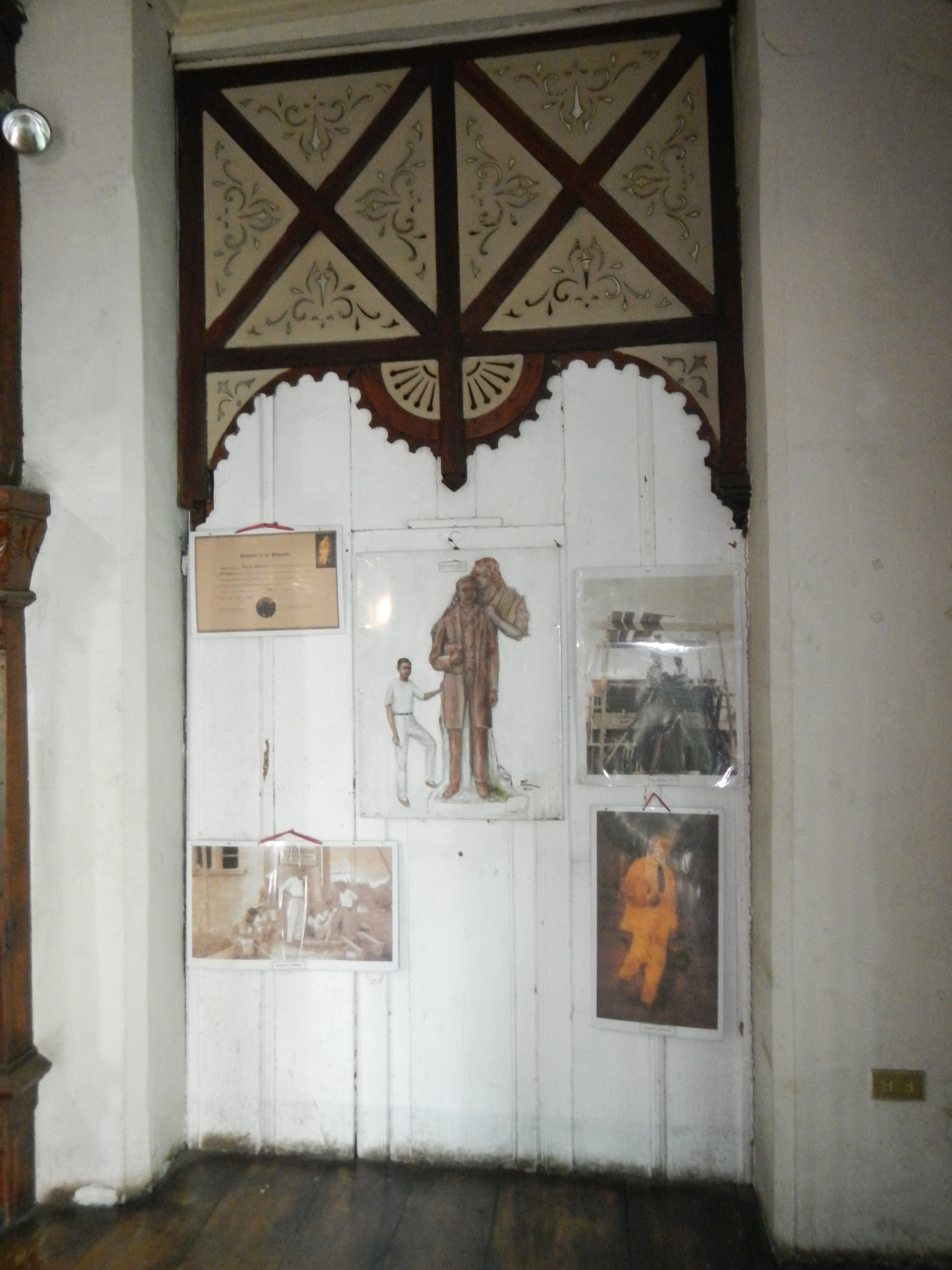
Interior

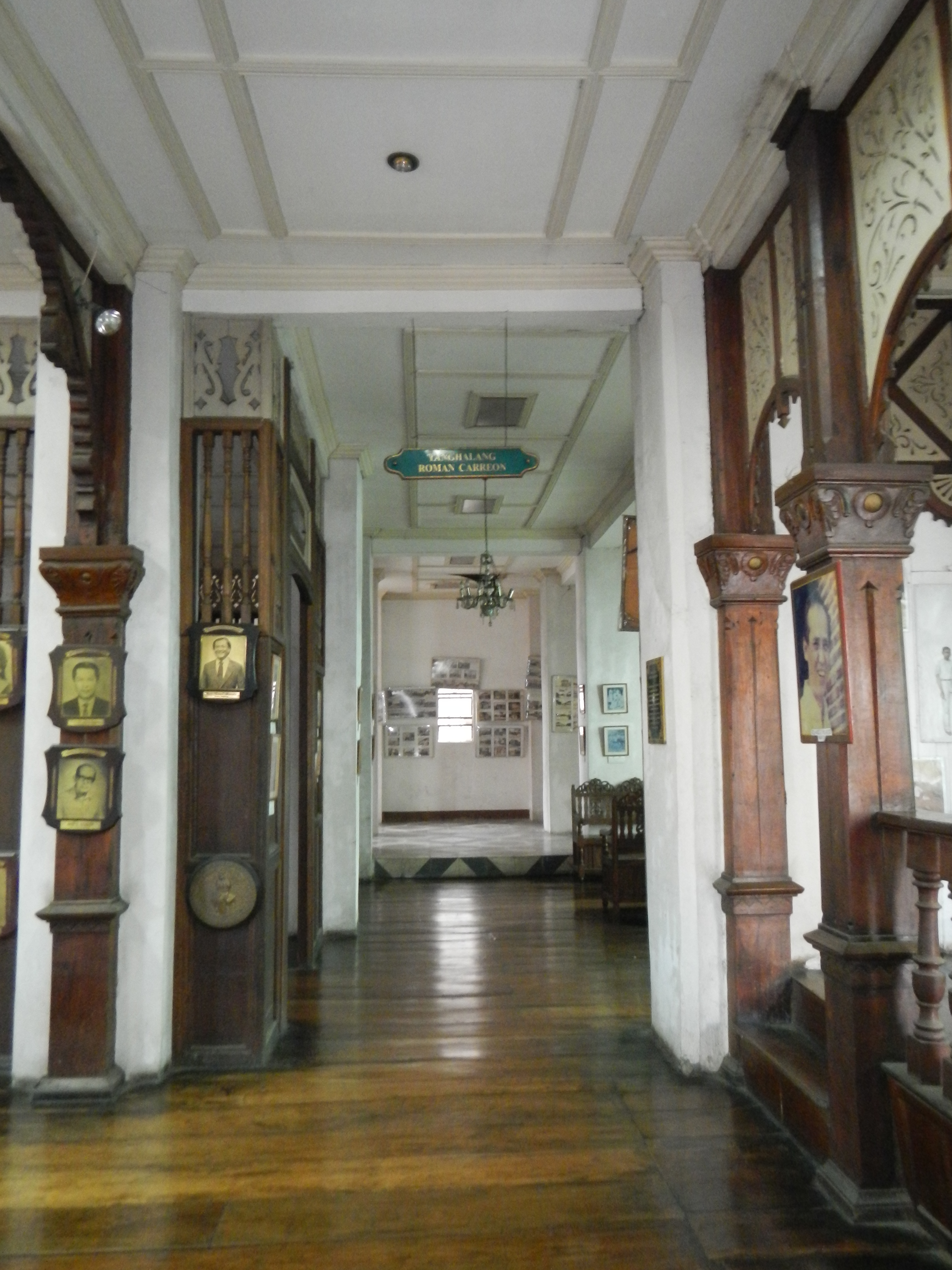
Bulwagang Roman C. Carreon

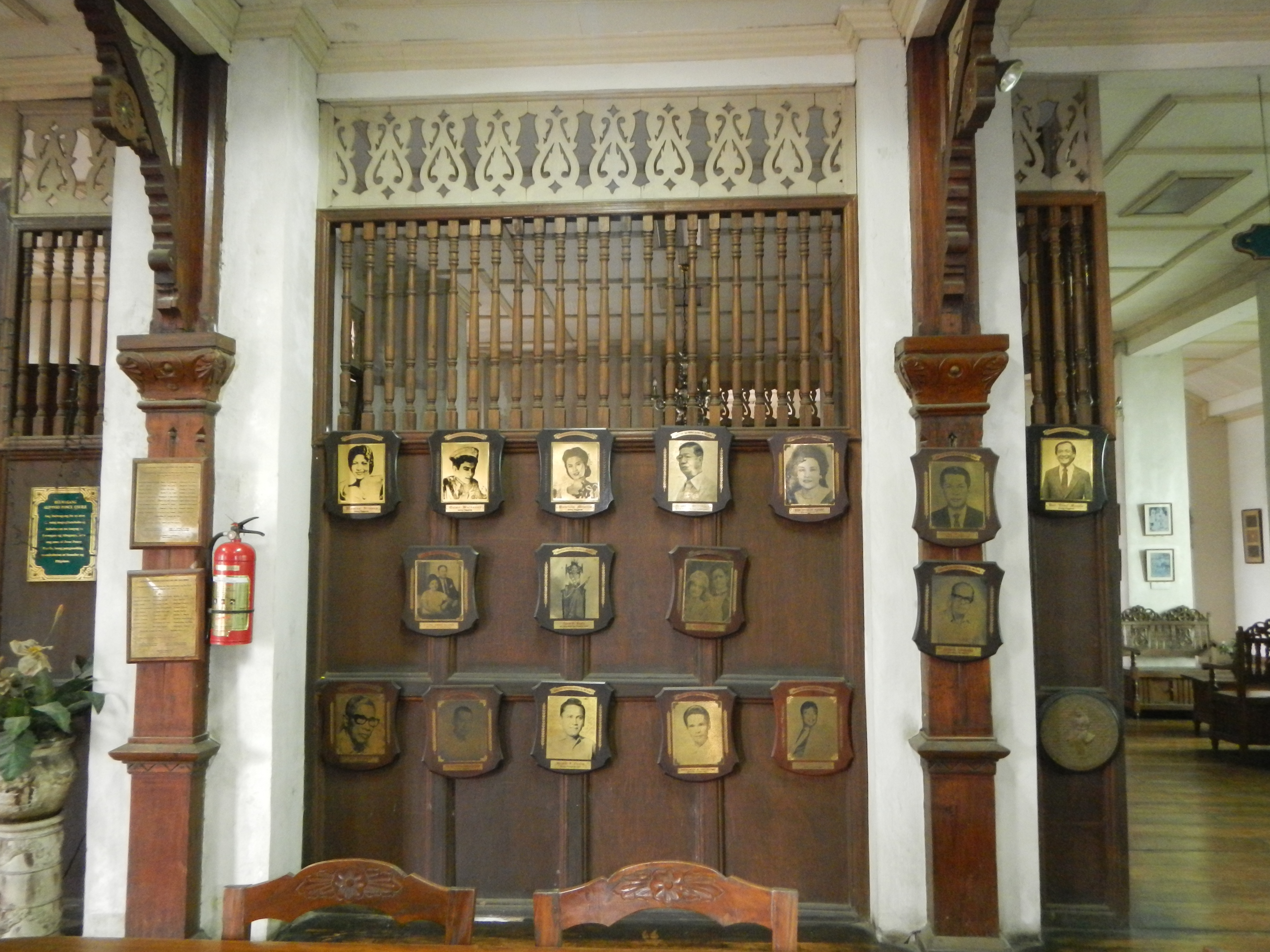
Portraits of Baliwag's notable residents

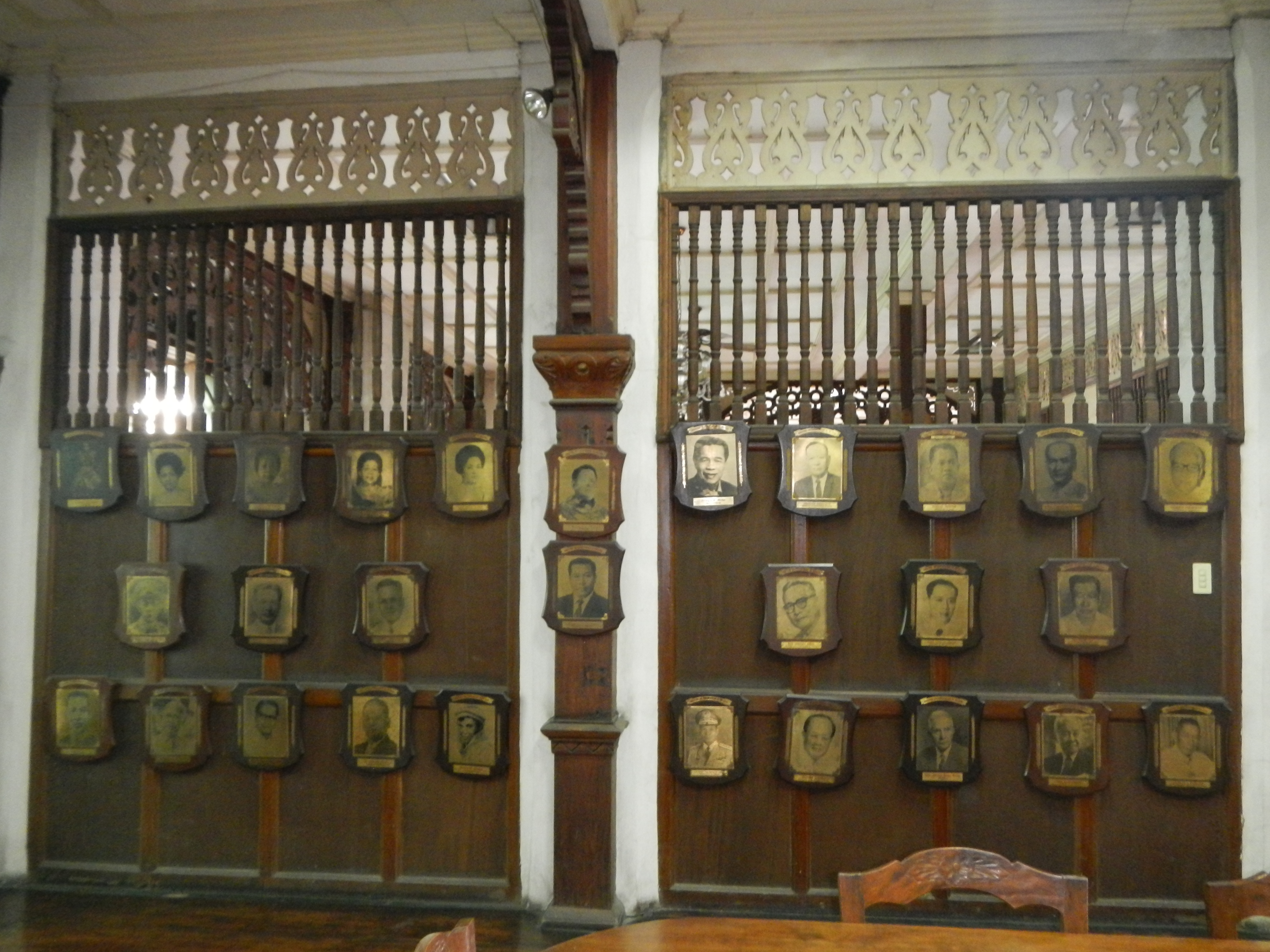
Baliwag's notable residents

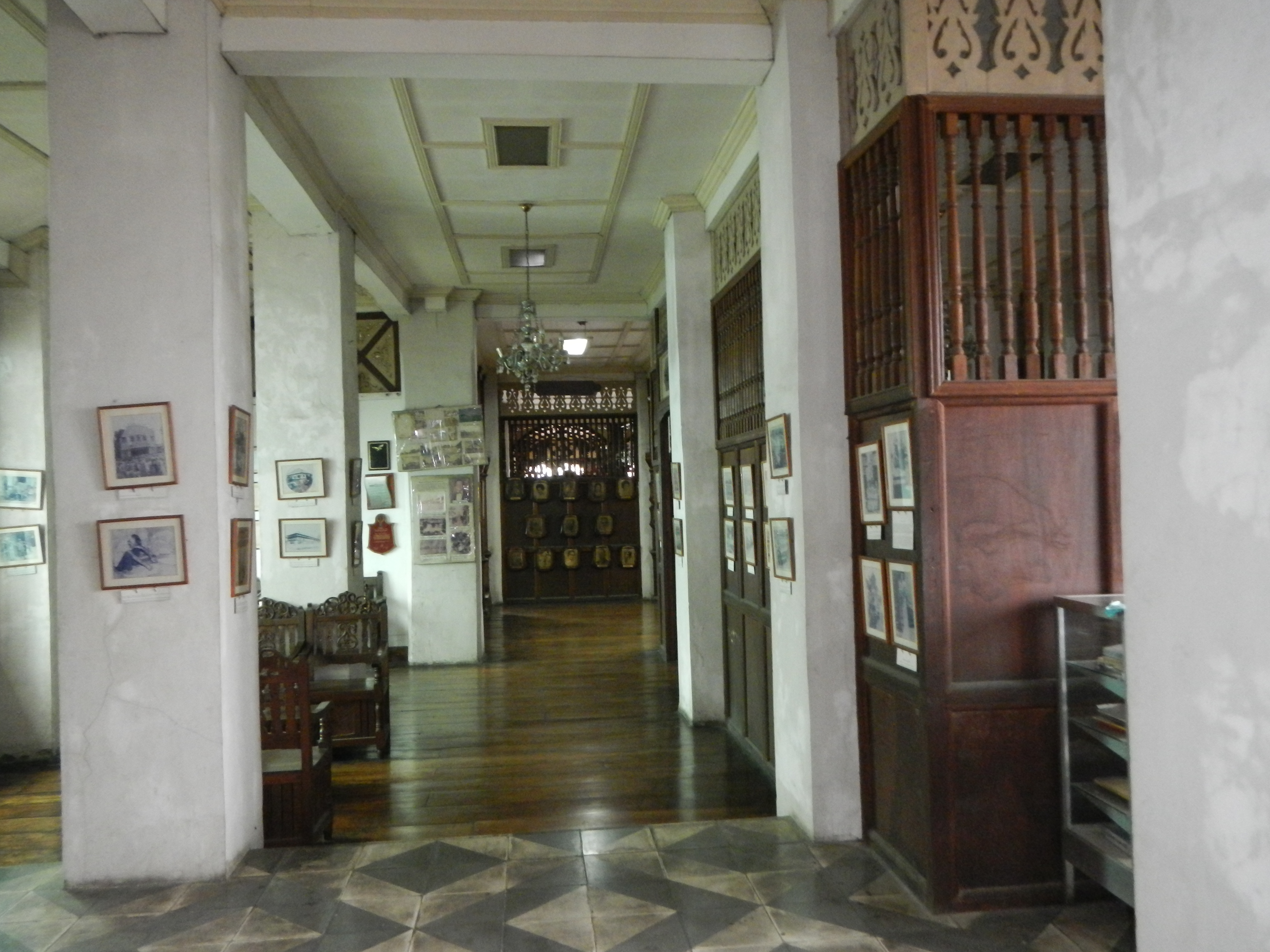
Second floor memorabilia

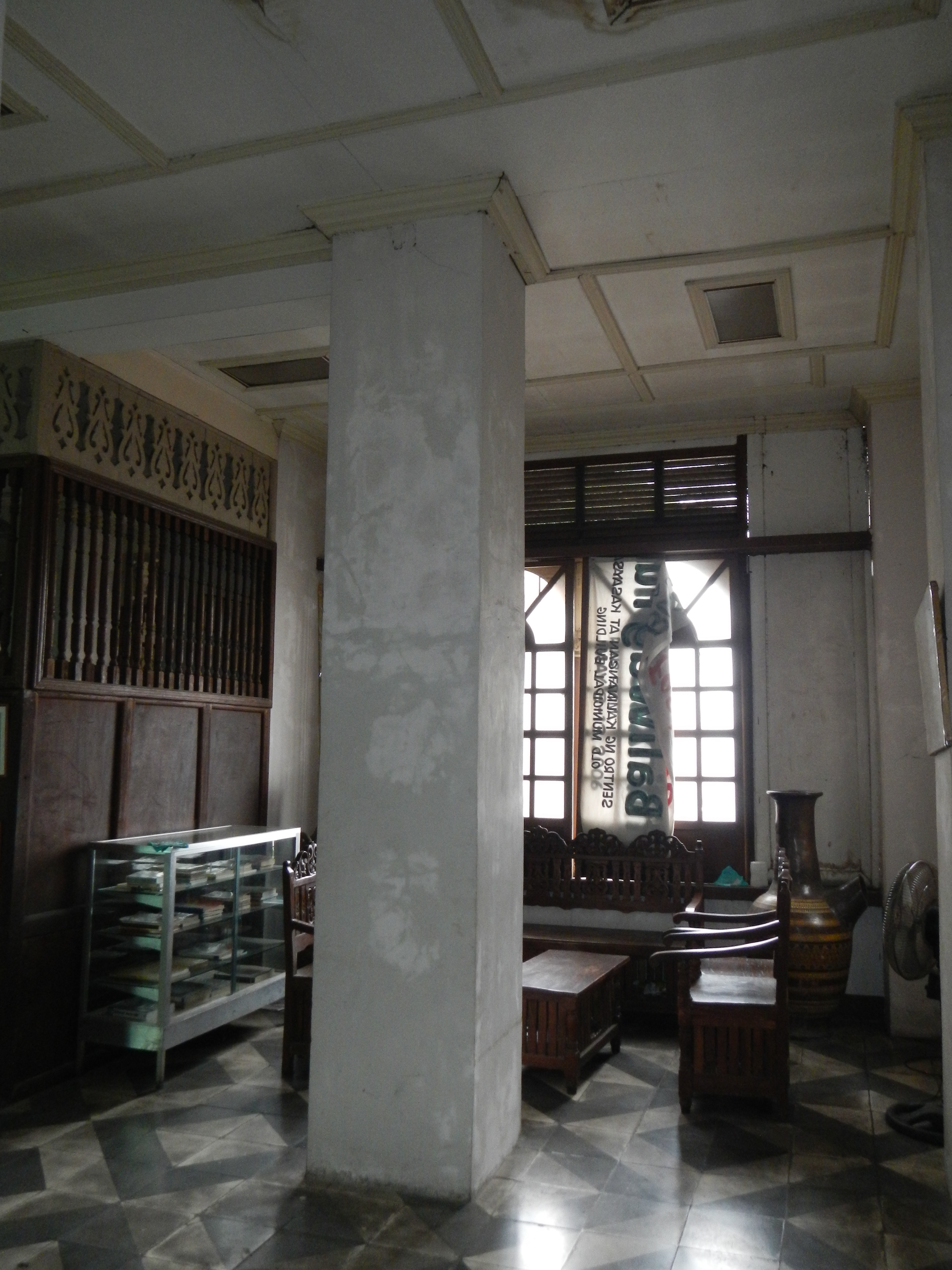
Memorabilia

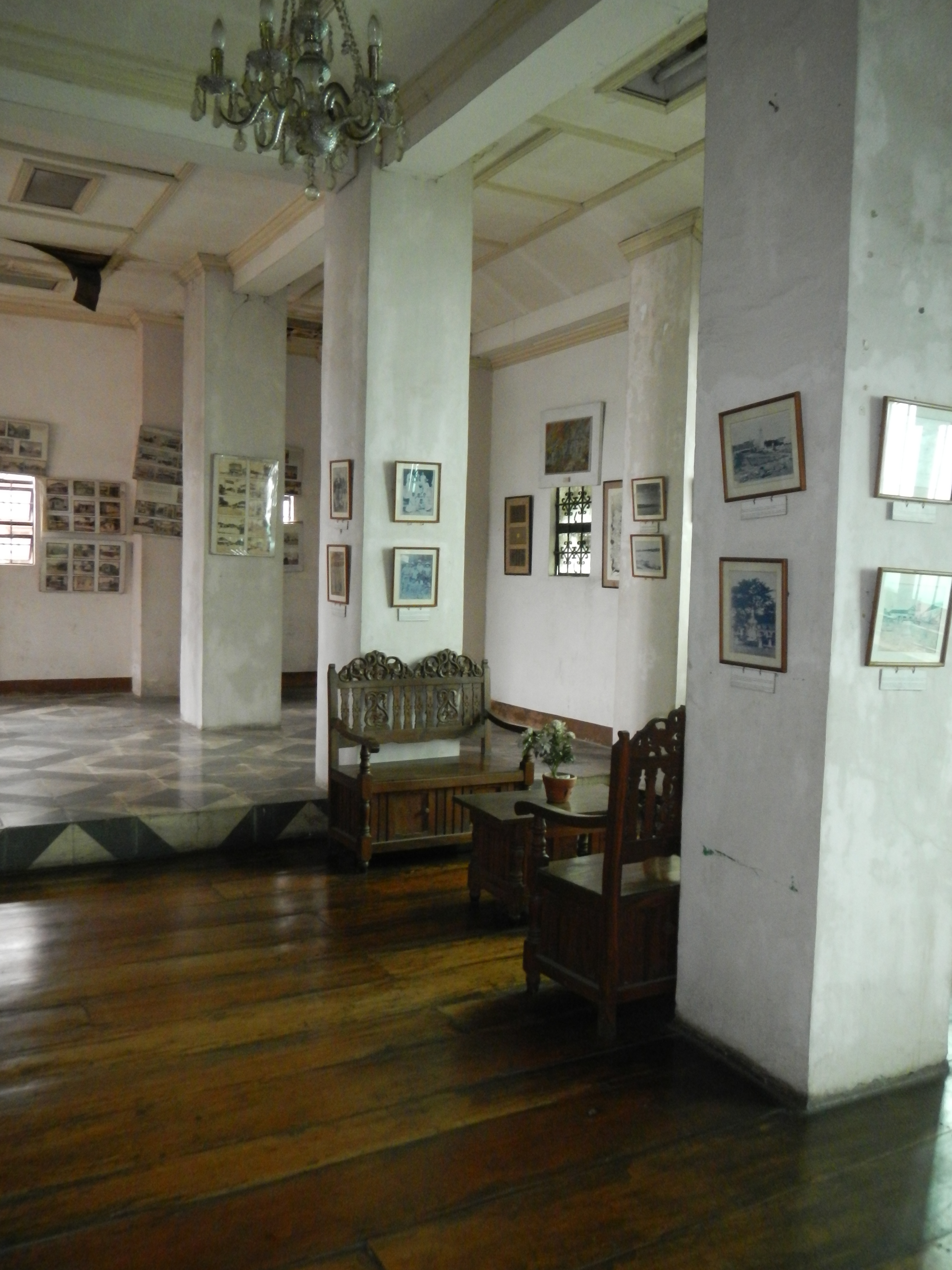
Hallway

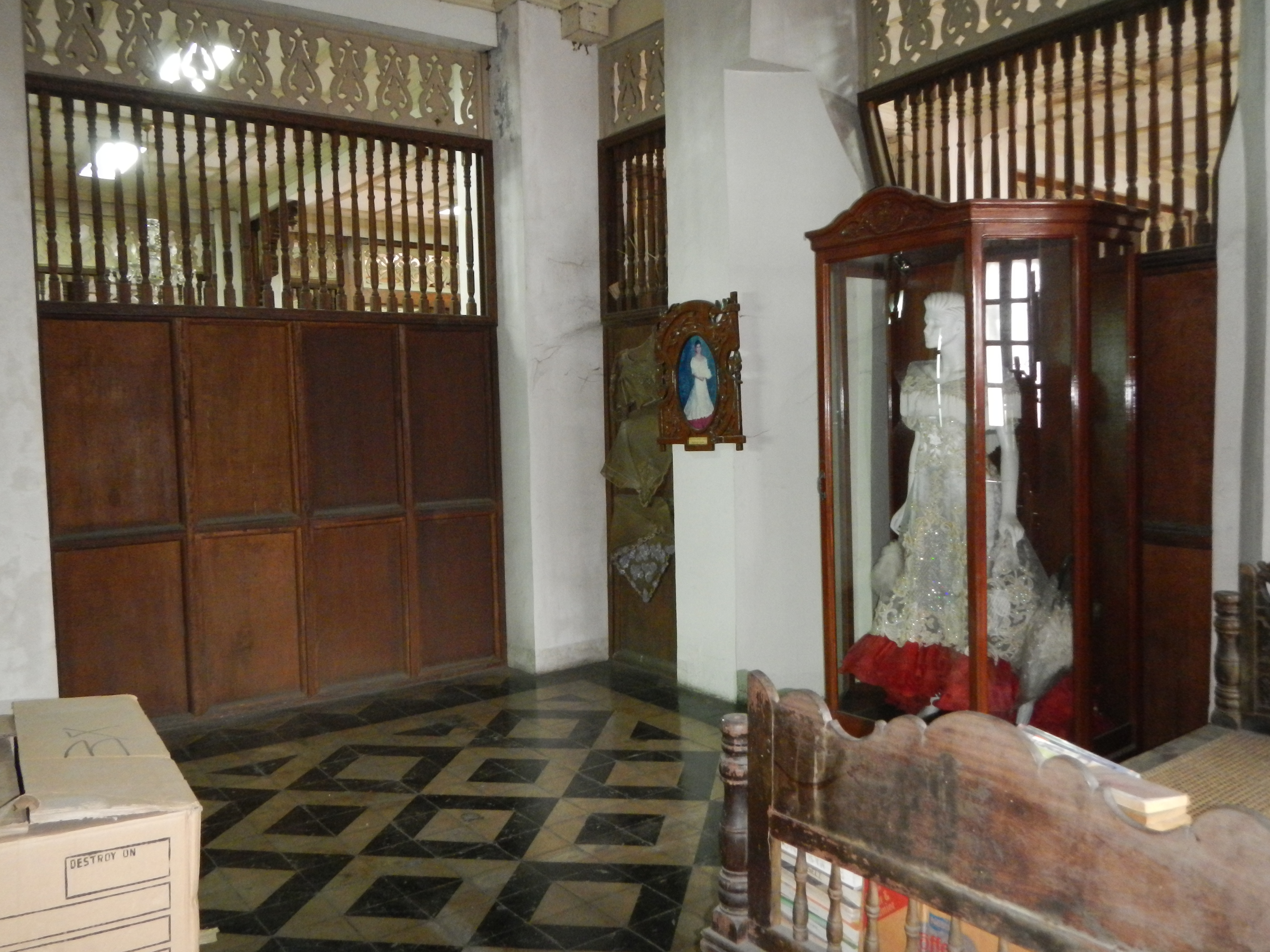
Bedroom

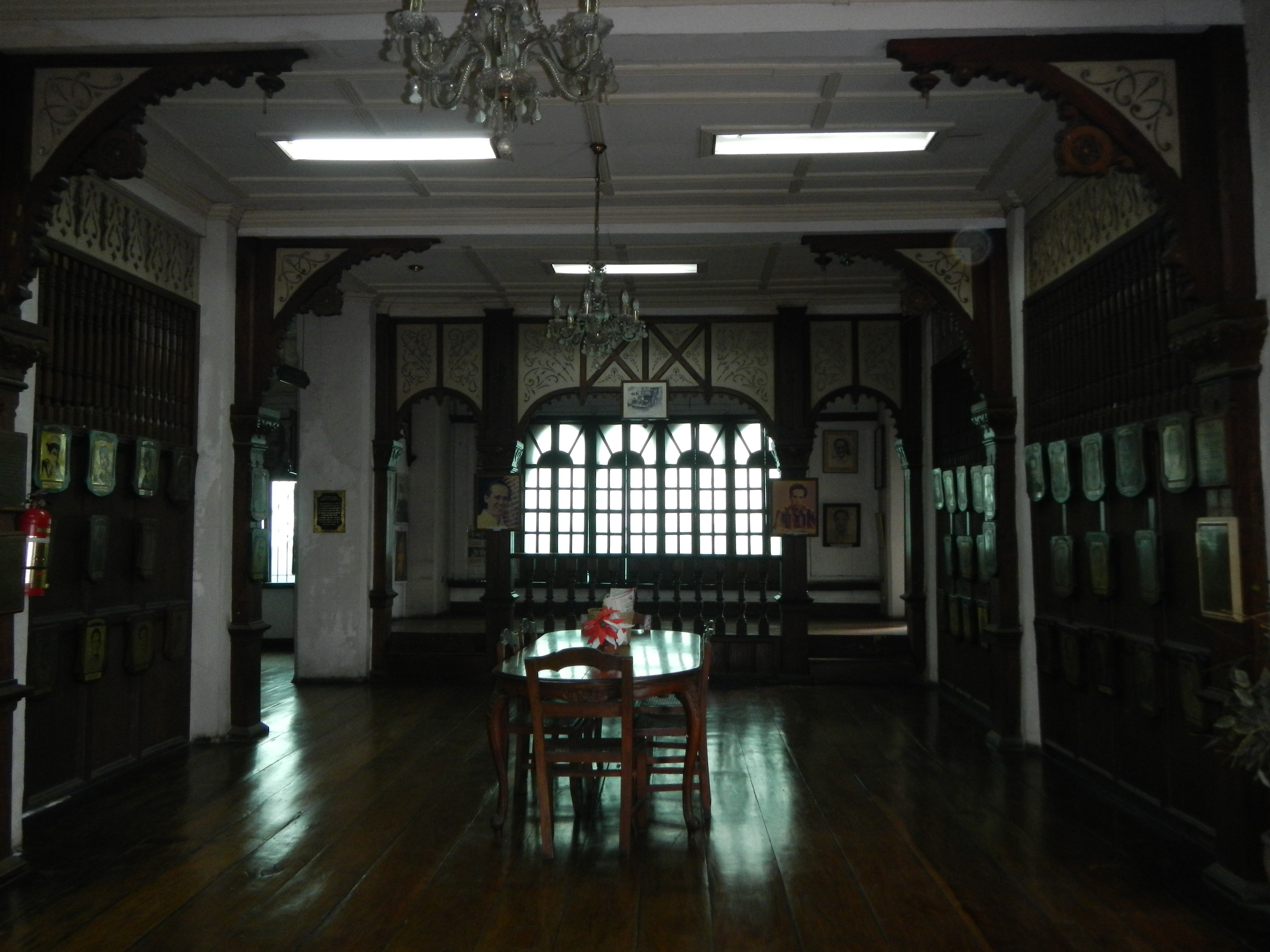
Interior

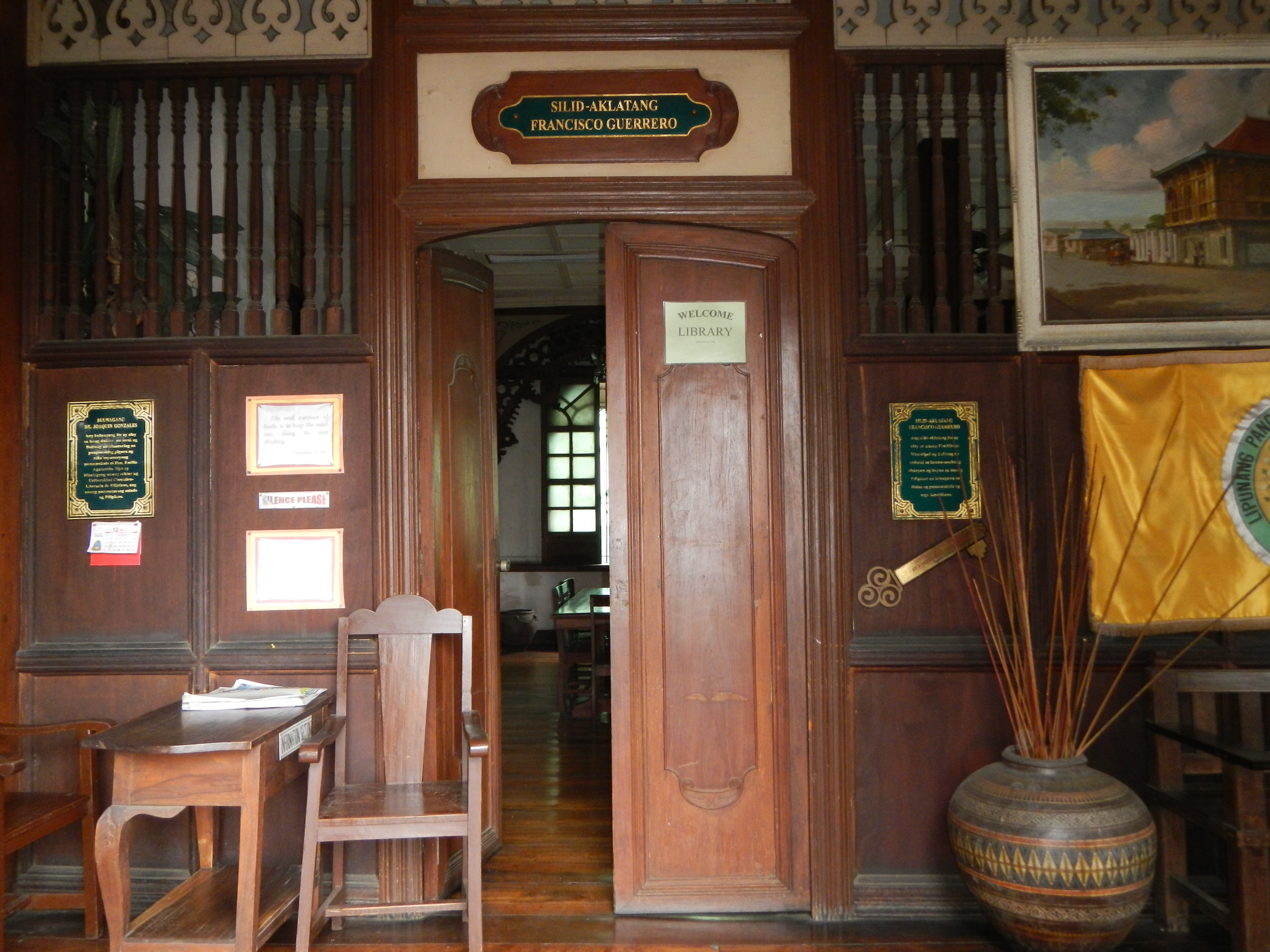
Main entrance, 1st Baliwag Mayor Francisco Guerrero Library

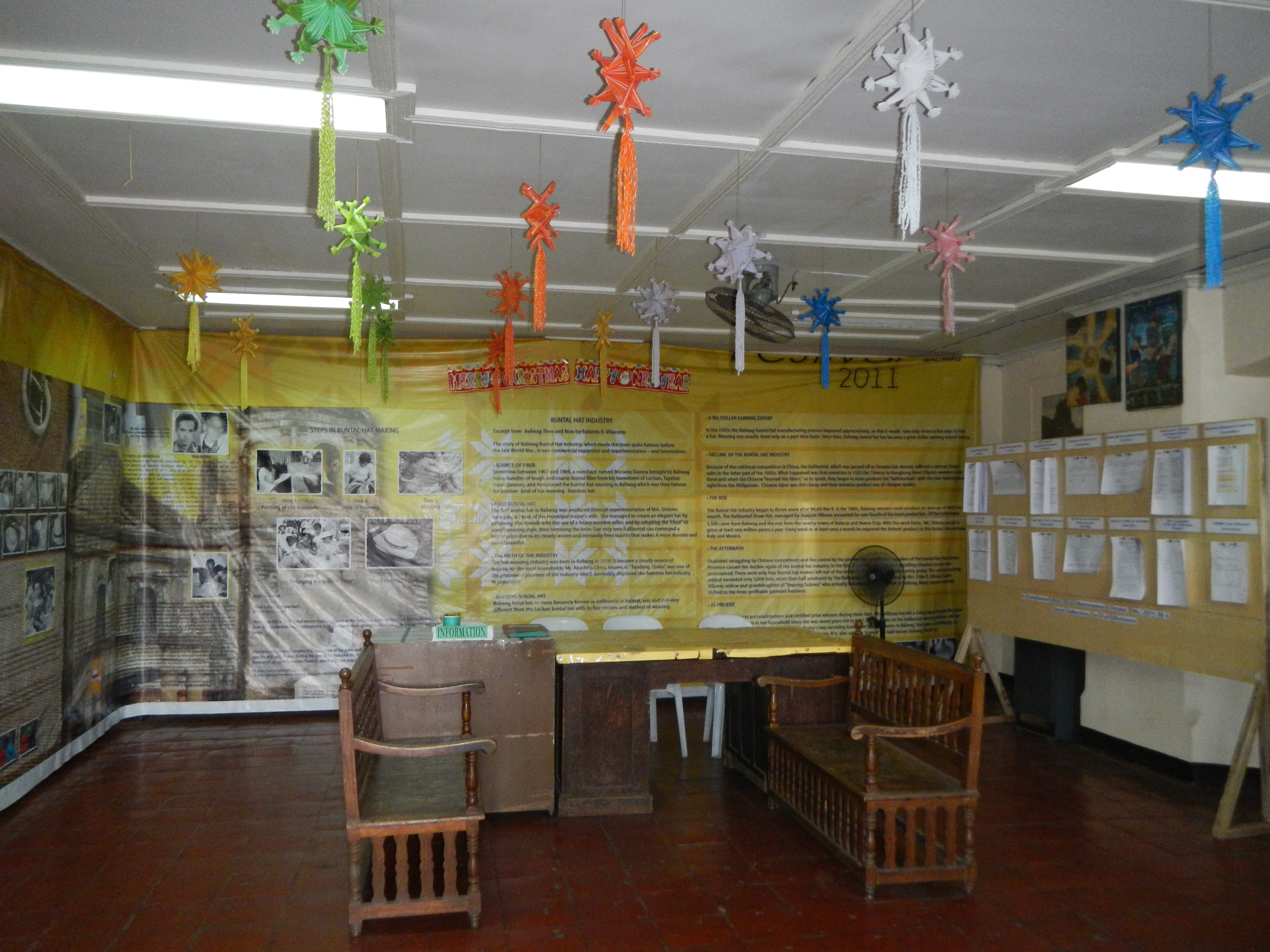
Interior (Baliwag community affairs and tourism office)

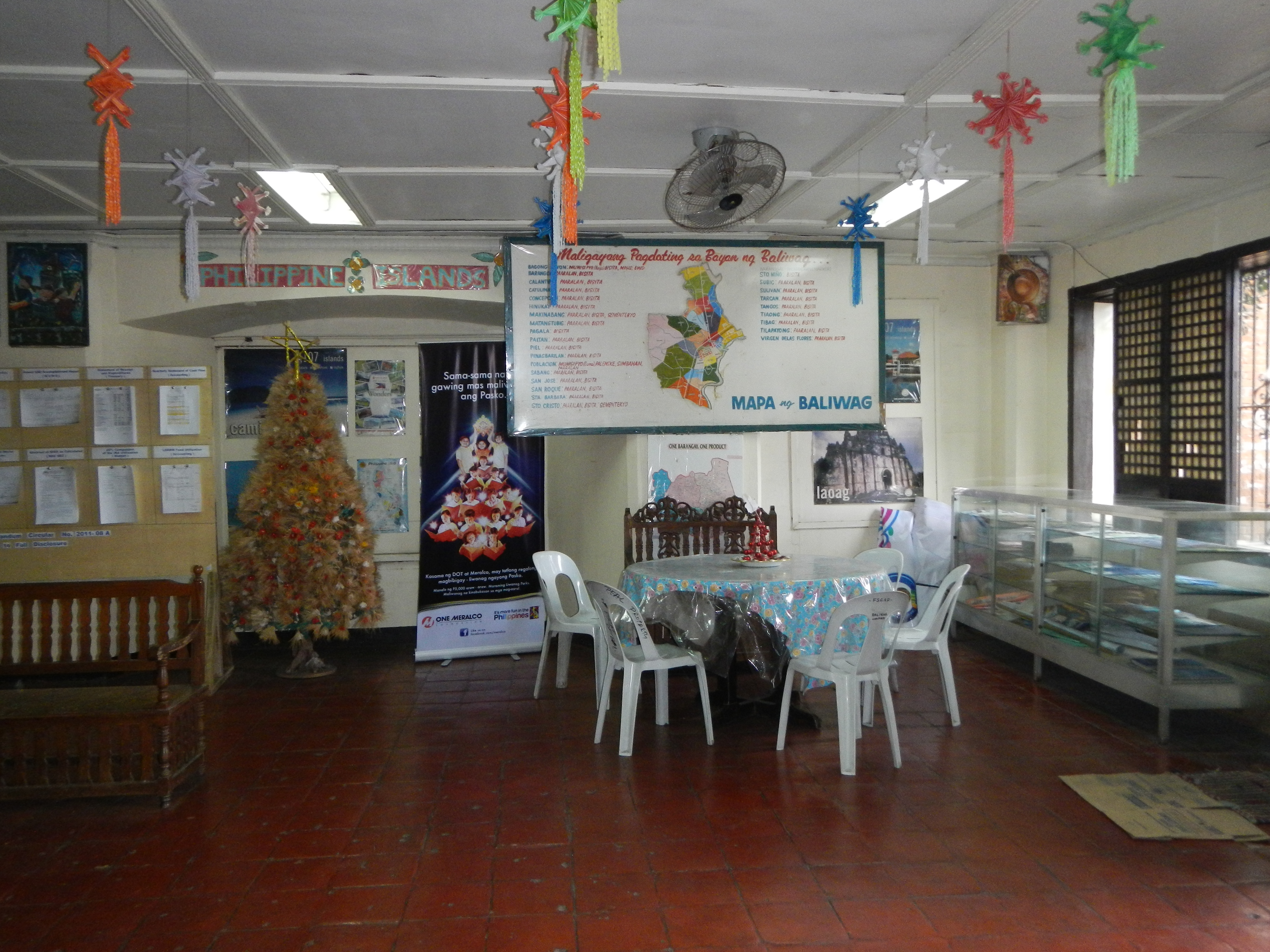
Ground floor (Tourism Office of Ms. Rosie Q. Bautista)

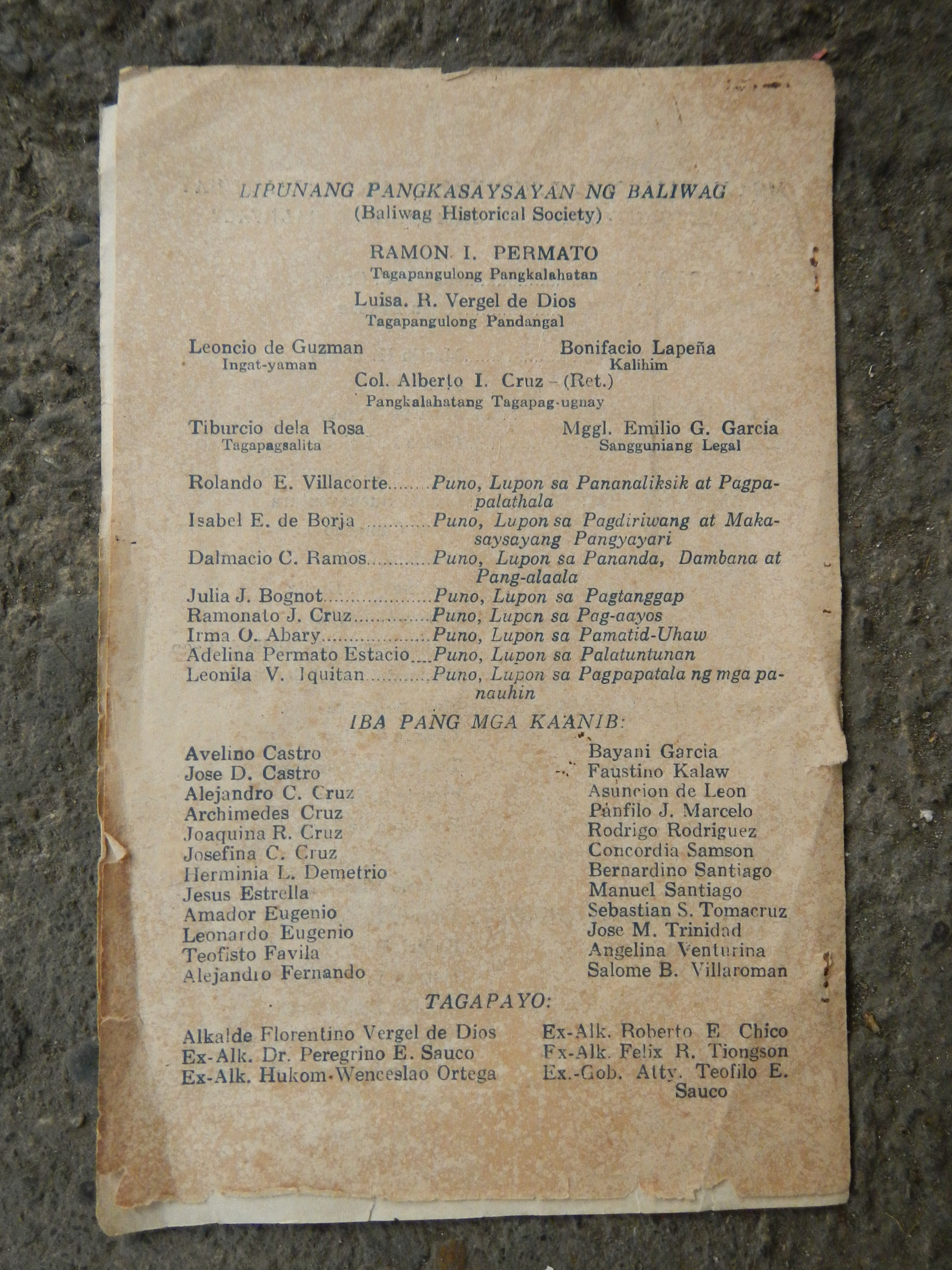
Baliwag Historical Society

== Literature ==
- Lenzi, Iola (2004). Museums of Southeast Asia. Singapore: Archipelago Press. p. 200 pages. ISBN 981-4068-96-9.
- "Catalogo Bio-Bibliographico de los Religiosos Agustinos de la Provincia del Santisimo Nombre de Jesus de las Islas Filipinas Desde su Fundacion hasta Nuestros Dias" by Elviro Jorde Perez. 1901, Manila. Estab. Tipo. De Colegio de Santo Tomas.
- "Apuntes históricos de la provincia augustiniana del Santísimo Nombre de Jesús de Filipinas", año 1909: Filipinas, by P. Bernardo Martinez.
- Baliuag: Then and Now, by Rolando E. Villacorte, Philippine Graphic Arts, Inc., Caloocan, 1970, 1985 * 2001 editions. pp. 5–111, 353-360 (2001 edition); and pp. 274–6; 392-396 (1985 edition).
- "Baliuag! then and now", by Rolando E. Villacorte, Published 1970 by Printed by Philippine Graphic Arts in Caloocan, Library of Congress DS689.B23 V55 409 pages Open Library OL5327794M
- "Baliuwag, Lunduyan ng mga Bayani", Baliuag Tourism Council, 2008, Municipality of Baliuag, 2008 Edition, pp. 10–120.

== See also ==
- St. Augustine Parish Church of Baliuag
- List of museums in the Philippines
- International Council of Museums
- International Museum Day (May 18)
- Museum education
- Virtual Library museums pages
