= St. Mary's College of Baliuag =

Roman Catholic college in Bulacan, Philippines

- Dalubhasaang Santa Maria ng Baliwag (Filipino)
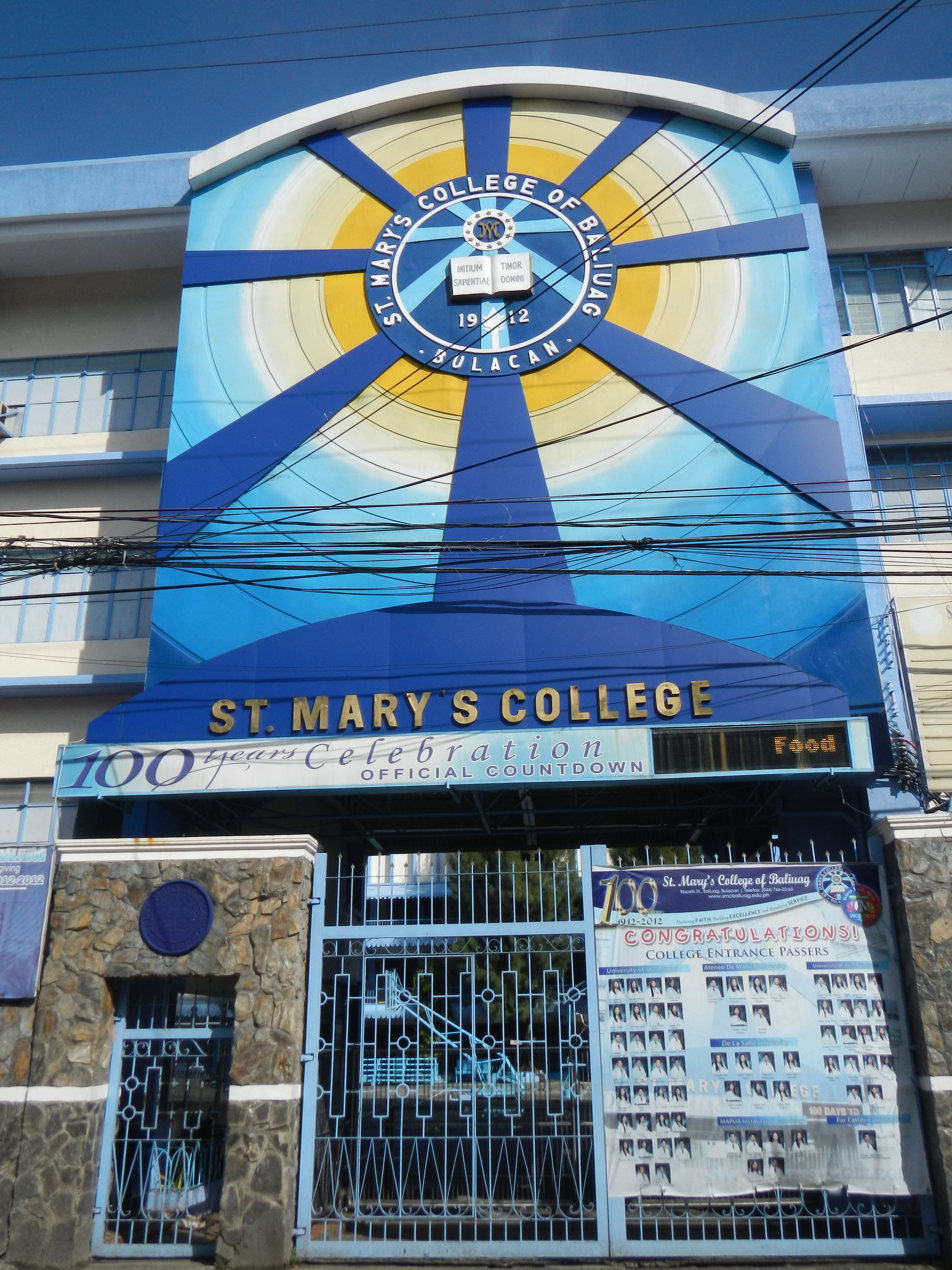
- Former names: Colegio de la Sagrada Familia (Holy Family School) (1912‑1959); St. Mary’s Academy (1959‑2002)
- Motto: Initium Sapientiae Timor Domini (Latin)
- Motto in English: The fear of the Lord is the beginning of wisdom
- Type: Private, Roman Catholic Coeducational Basic and Higher education institution
- Established: 1912
- Religious affiliation: Roman Catholic (RVM Sisters)
- Academic affiliations: PAASCU
- President: Sr. Ma. Violeta S. Juanico, RVM
- Principal: Perfecto T. Austria (Integrated Basic Education)
- Dean: Marita G. Fiestada
- Executive Vice-President: Myrna S. Bondad
- Students: Ignacian Marians
- Location: Racelis St., Baliwag, Bulacan, Philippines; 14°57′22″N 120°54′00″E
- Campus: Urban
- Patroness: Blessed Virgin Mary
- Colors: Blue and White
- Website: www.smcbaliwag.edu.ph
- Location in Bulacan Location in Luzon Location in the Philippines

St. Mary's College of Baliuag (St. Mary's College, St. Mary's, SMA, SMCB) is a private, Catholic Co-educational basic and higher education institution administered by the Religious of the Virgin Mary in Baliwag, Philippines. It was formerly named Colegio de la Sagrada Familia or Holy Family School, when founded in 1912. On June 30, 1959, the Holy Family School was renamed St. Mary's Academy (SMA). It provides Preparatory, Primary, Secondary, and Tertiary education. It is the only Catholic school in the City of Baliuag, Bulacan.

== History ==
St. Mary's College of Baliuag was founded in 1912, and is the oldest existing private educational institution in the town of Baliuag, Bulacan. It is owned and administered by the Religious of the Virgin Mary, the first pontifically approved congregation for women in the Philippines. The religious sisters are better known as the RVM Sisters.

This sectarian school began as Colegio de la Sagrada Familia (Holy Family School). It was put up by Fr. Benito Sebrero for the Sisters to provide education and Catholic religious instruction to young girls and at the same time to serve as the Catholic school of the parish. Originally located a few blocks from the parish church, it acquired its present site through the generosity of Fr. Victor Enrile, the parish priest then. Its pioneering years in Baliuag were “years of financial crisis, trials and deprivation.” It was only Fr. Enrile’s fatherly solicitude and Doña Dorotea Francisco’s magnanimity that encouraged the Sisters to go on.

On September 15, 1916 the Archdiocese of Manila, through Rev. Jeremias J. Harty, granted the Religious of the Virgin Mary (then headed by Superior General Mother Ma. Efigenia Alvarez), perpetual and gratuitous use of that parcel of land along what is now known as Racelis Street

In the beginning, the school offered only primary course, piano lessons, and catechetical classes. Intermediate classes were opened in 1933. When World War II broke out, classes were suspended and the Sisters evacuated with the townspeople. Japanese soldiers occupied the school house until the eve of liberation.

The Sisters returned back to Baliuag and reopened the school in 1945,. This time, complete elementary and secondary courses were offered. Boys and girls were admitted in the grade school but only girls in the high school. The elementary course was granted government recognition in 1946 and the secondary course in 1949.

The high school admitted boys in 1954 but this co-educational experiment lasted only until 1958 because there were other non-sectarian schools in the town of Baliuag that provided secondary education for boys.

Under the leadership of Sr. Ma. Fideliz Dar Santos, SMA achieved an appreciable degree of progress and expansion from 1961 to 1967. Sister Dar Santos spearheaded the construction of an annex building. This housed the Sisters’ cloister, chapel, interns’ dormitory, library, and science laboratory. This annex building was completed by the succeeding Superior-Principal, Sr. Ma. Felisa Declaro. The building housed the Principal’s and Cashier’s offices and high school classrooms. These improvements spurred an influx of more students. For more effective teacher supervision, academic coordinators were assigned beginning in mid-1970: Ms. Herminia Demetrio for the grade school department and Ms. Ofelia delos Santos for the high school department.

In School Year 1985-1986, at the request of the parents, SMA readmitted boys in the high school department.

In 1990, another four-storey building named Mother Ignacia Building was constructed to complete the school front of four-storey buildings, now a landmark in the town of Baliuag.

In response to the thrust for lay empowerment, the first lay High School Principal, Mrs. Myrna Bondad, was appointed in June 1995. S. Ma. Lilibeth Monteclaro was also assigned as Grade School Principal.

Sr. Ma. Violeta Acosta took over in School Year 1996-1997. Under her leadership, the school embarked on having the school accredited by the Philippine Accrediting Association of Schools, Colleges and Universities (PAASCU).

Both the grade school and high school passed the preliminary visits with flying colors in 1999 and 2000, respectively. In June 1999, Mrs. Elizabeth Chico was appointed the first lay Grade School Principal. Through her leadership, the elementary department passed the first Formal Visit in September 2000.

Starting School Year 2000-2001, SMA shifted and explored other innovative teaching-learning techniques and introduced the use of strategies that cater to the students’ divergent learning capacities and modalities. The school can claim to be the first in Baliuag to advocate the use of classroom activities based on Howard Gardner’s theory of Multiple Intelligences and Dunn and Dunn Learning Style Model.

Beginning School Year 2001-2002, Sr. Ma. Marissa Viri took over as the school’s Directress. In October of the same year, the High School Department was granted accredited status by PAASCU. In March 2002, the school applied for tertiary level programs and was renamed St. Mary’s College of Baliuag with Sr. Ma. Marissa Viri as its first President.

The first batch of college students were admitted in Academic Year 2002-2003. The following courses were offered: Bachelor of Science in Information Technology, Bachelor of Science in Business Administration, Bachelor of Secondary Education, and Bachelor in Elementary Education.

In School Year 2003-2004, the College Department added two more courses: Bachelor of Science in Nursing and Bachelor of Science in Hotel and Restaurant Management. This same year, the CISCO Program was offered to Bachelor of Science in Information Technology (BSIT) students as well as to the 3rd year High School students. The Grade School Department also started offering nursery classes for three-year old kids. In September 2003, the Grade School Department had its first PAASCU re-visit and was granted Five-Year Accredited Status.

The following school year, 2004-2005 the High School Department was revisited and was also granted a Five-Year Accredited Status.

The first Capping and Candle-lighting Ceremony of the Nursing Program was held on June 7, 2005 and the first graduation of the College Department was held on March 19, 2006.

In 2007, the college started offering short–term technical and vocational courses. Students of the Bachelor of Science in Hotel and Restaurant Management (BSHRM) program were also sent to On-the-Job training to Singapore.

In June 2008, Sr. Ma. Marisa Rebosura was appointed the second President of SMCB. In September 2008, SMCB partnered with Gawad Kalinga (GK) and became the GK Builder’s Institute in Bulacan. The following year, the first ever GK village was established in Piel, Baliuag and the school was given a block of thirty housing units called St. Mary’s Village.

On February 24–25, 2009, the Grade School Department underwent its PAASCU Revisit and was granted Level II re- accredited status. With Mrs. Ma. Clara Sepacio as the new Principal, the High School Department underwent its revisit on August 26–27, 2010 and was also granted Level II Re-accredited status.

With the theme "Rekindling the Spirit", SMCB celebrated its centenary in 2012. The celebration commemorated the school's 100th anniversary and recognized the role of Venerable Mother Ignacia del Espíritu Santo, foundress of the RVM Congregation, in its history. The celebration also highlighted the values of faith, excellence, and service associated with the school's history and mission.

On December 12, 2012, Feast of Our Lady of Guadalupe, the school celebrated its Centennial Jubilee. On the same day, SMCB was consecrated to our Lady.

During its centennial year, St. Mary’s College of Baliuag undertook several significant physical improvements, including the establishment of a school museum and the placement of the Mother Ignacia cornerstone. Enhancements were made to the school façade and the expansion of the chapel, while the Guidance and Testing Center, along with the Registrar and Cashier’s offices, were relocated to the ground floor of the Mother Ignacia Building. Additionally, the High School TLE Laboratory underwent renovations. With a firm trust in God’s providence, St. Mary’s College continues to embody and promote the three Ignacian core values of faith, excellence, and service as it progresses beyond its first century.

For school year 2012-2013, the school underwent another major change. With the implementation of an institutionalized management and supervision system, an Integrated Basic Education Department was born where there is only one Principal, Academic Coordinators and Subject Area Coordinators for both departments. The same school year also saw the implementation of the K to 12 curriculum in Grades 1 and 7.

In June 2013, air conditioning units (ACUs) were installed in all classrooms and learning centers. Exterior painting of the buildings was also done. With the school’s adoption of the GENYO E-Learning Management System to replace the CISCO Program, a new computer laboratory was added for the purpose. The high school computer laboratory was moved to the 2nd floor of St. Joseph building. A new program, Bachelor of Science in Tourism Management (BSIT), was offered in the College Department.

School Year 2014-2015 was marked by the following milestones: 1) The PAASCU Resurvey of the Integrated Basic Education Department on October 23–24, 2014 and the eventual granting of another five-year reaccredited status until 2019; 2) The granting of ISO 9001:2008 Certificate by TÜV Rheinland from May 2015 until May 2018; 3) The Department of Education’s (DepEd) granting of the provisionary permit for SMCB’s Senior High School Program (SHSP) which would be offered beginning SY 2016-2017. Physical improvements included the merging of the Basic Education and College libraries; a provision for a satellite canteen and a multi-purpose hall at the Sacred Heart Building; a wellness center and Kid’s Care room in the ground floor of Holy Family Building. CCTV cameras were also installed in strategic places for security and monitoring purposes.

In school year 2015-2016, SMCB welcomed Sr. Ma. Paula G. Adaoag as its third President.

On November 7, 2016, SMCB was formally awarded its ISO 9001:2008 Certificate by TÜV Rheinland. The College Department opened a two-year Teacher Certification Program (TCP) and the Bachelor in Tourism Management was given government recognition by the Commission on Higher Education (CHED).

For school year 2016-2017, SMCB welcomed its first batch of Senior High School (SHS) students in the Academic and TechVoc Tracks. For the Academic Track, the following strands are offered: Science, Technology, Engineering and Mathematics (STEM), Accounting, Business and Management (ABM), Humanities and Social Sciences (HUMSS), and General Academic (GAS). Technical- Vocational Track includes specialization in Home Economics (HE) and Information and Communication Technology (ICT). For the school’s facilities, a library for Senior High School is provided and a new state of the art Speech Laboratory has been installed.

On the other hand, one class of the Munting Paaralan ni Madre Ignacia Del Espiritu Santo (MPMIDES), an outreach program of the school’s Community Involvement Program (CIP) was transferred to the SMCB campus in June. This program provides free education to deserving Kindergarten pupils. For quality assurance, The Federation of Accrediting Agencies of the Philippines (FAAP) granted the school’s Basic Education Program Level III Re-Accredited Status after having satisfactorily met the standards and fulfilled the requirements of the Philippine Accrediting Association of Schools, Colleges and Universities (PAASCU). The certification was given on July 18 and is valid until November 2019.

In October of the same year, Sr. Ma. Ceferina Bodiongan was designated as the new President due to the untimely demise of the Sr. Ma. Paula Adaoag. Mrs. Myrna Bondad was also appointed as the Executive Vice President.

On March 1, 2017, TÜV Rheinland had its second Follow-Up Audit of SMCB where the audit team concluded that the school “has established and maintained an effective system to ensure compliance with its policies and objectives” and therefore recommended the maintenance of the existing ISO Certification. SY 2017-2018 signals SMCB’s transitioning to ISO 9001:2015 Standards.

School year 2017-2018 welcomed the new batch of grade 11 students as it prepares for the first Grade 12 graduation in March 2018.
