= Ferdie Estrella =

Filipino politician

Ferdinand Estrella
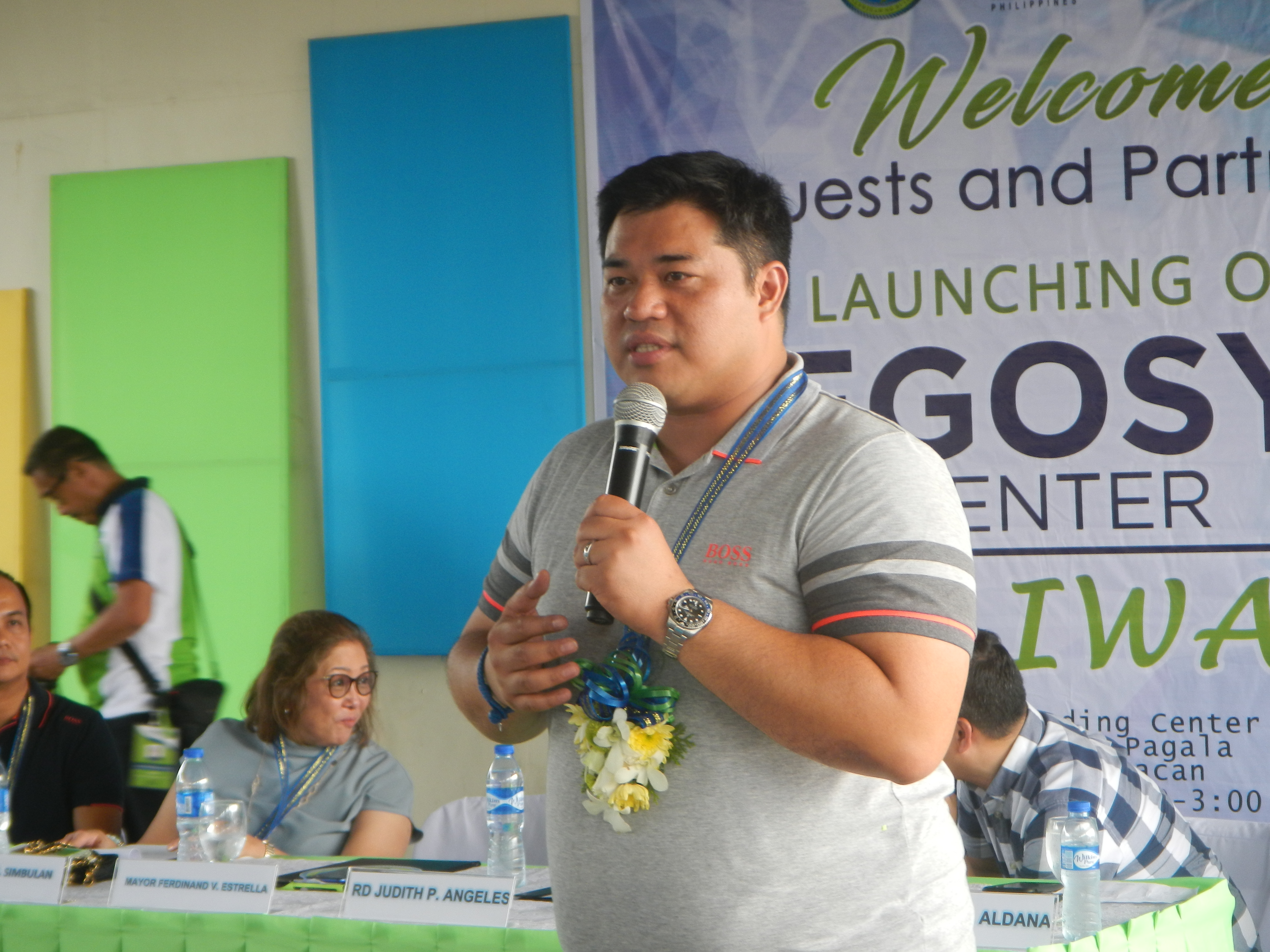

Vice Mayor of Baliwag
- Incumbent
- Assumed office June 30, 2025
- Mayor: Sonia Estrella
- Preceded by: Marie Claudette Quimpo

Mayor of Baliwag
- In office June 30, 2016 – June 30, 2025
- Vice Mayor: Christopher Clemente (2016–2022); Marie Claudette Quimpo (2022–2025)
- Preceded by: Carolina Dellosa
- Succeeded by: Sonia Estrella

Personal details
- Born: Ferdinand Viceo Estrella; September 5, 1979 (age 47) Bulacan, Philippines
- Party: NUP (2012–2015; 2024–present)
- Other political affiliations: NPC (2015–2018); PDP–Laban (2018–2024)
- Education: University of Asia and the Pacific (BS Entrepreneurial Management, 2003)
- Profession: Politician
- Website: http://www.ferdievestrella.com/

Ferdinand "Ferdie" Viceo Estrella (born September 5, 1979) is a Filipino politician who is currently serving as vice mayor of Baliwag, in office since 2025. Previously, he was a barangay chairman of Poblacion from 2007 until 2016, the ABC President of the municipality from 2010 until 2016, and municipal and city mayor from 2016 to 2025.

== Early life and education ==
Estrella was born on September 5, 1979, in Bulacan, Philippines. He is the son of businesswoman Sonia Viceo and former Mayor Romeo M. Estrella (January 17, 1943 – March 7, 2019), who served as mayor of Baliwag from 2004 to 2013.

Estrella graduated in 2003 from the University of Asia and the Pacific (UA&P) with a degree in Entrepreneurial Management.

== Political career ==
Estrella began his political career in 2007 as the Barangay chairman of Poblacion, Baliwag. He served in this role until 2016 and was also the ABC President of the municipality from 2010 to 2016.

In 2016, Estrella was elected mayor of Baliwag, succeeding Carolina Dellosa. He has since been re-elected and continues to serve in this role. During his tenure, he has focused on improving local infrastructure, promoting economic development, and enhancing public services.

Estrella has been affiliated with several political parties throughout his career. He was a member of the NUP from 2012 to 2015, the NPC from 2015 to 2018, and the PDP–Laban from 2018 to 2024. In 2024, he returned to the NUP.

Having served three terms as mayor, he instead ran for vice mayor and won.

== COVID-19 diagnosis ==
On March 17, 2020, Estrella tested positive for COVID-19. He recovered on March 29, 2020.

== Legal issues ==
On July 14, 2017, the Ombudsman of the Philippines filed criminal cases before the Sandiganbayan against Estrella's father, former Mayor Romeo M. Estrella, for violations of Section 3 (e) of Republic Act 3019 (Anti-Graft and Corrupt Practices Act), Section 59 Book V of the Administrative Code of 1987, and Article 171 (4) of the Revised Penal Code. The charges specified that the former mayor allegedly appointed his niece, Julieta Estrella-Laguna, as the municipal government's labor general foreman in violation of the Civil Service rules against nepotism.

On March 12, 2019, Sandiganbayan Second Division granted the motions for leave of court and the demurrer to evidence filed by former Baliuag, Bulacan mayor Romeo Estrella, effectively dismissing the two graft cases filed against him by the Office of the Ombudsman in connection with a dispute over market stall rentals.

== Personal life ==
Estrella is married to Jonnah Nubla, and they have two sons. He maintains a low-profile personal life.

== Gallery ==
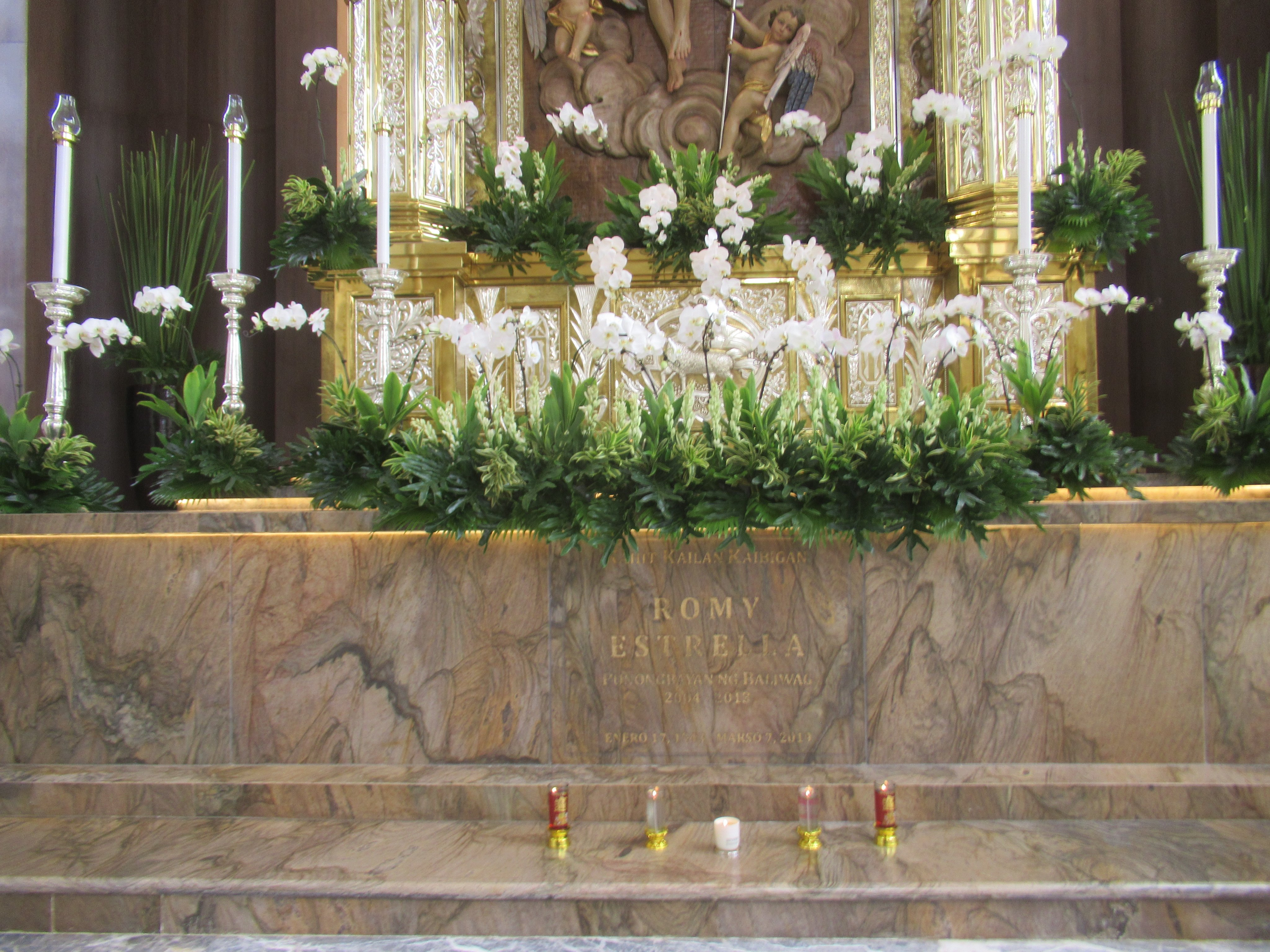
The tomb-chapel

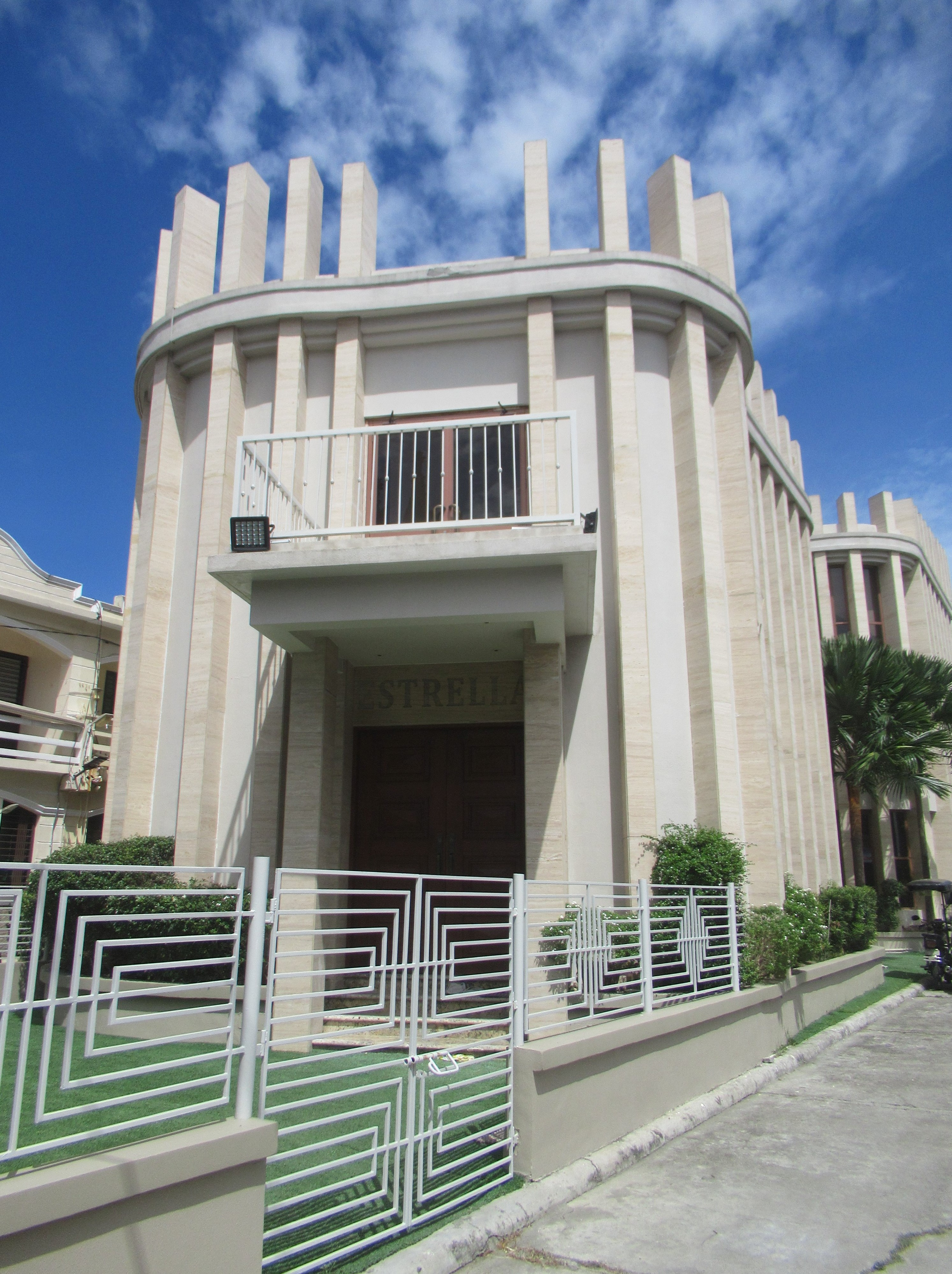
Romeo-Ferdinand Estrella Family Mausoleum

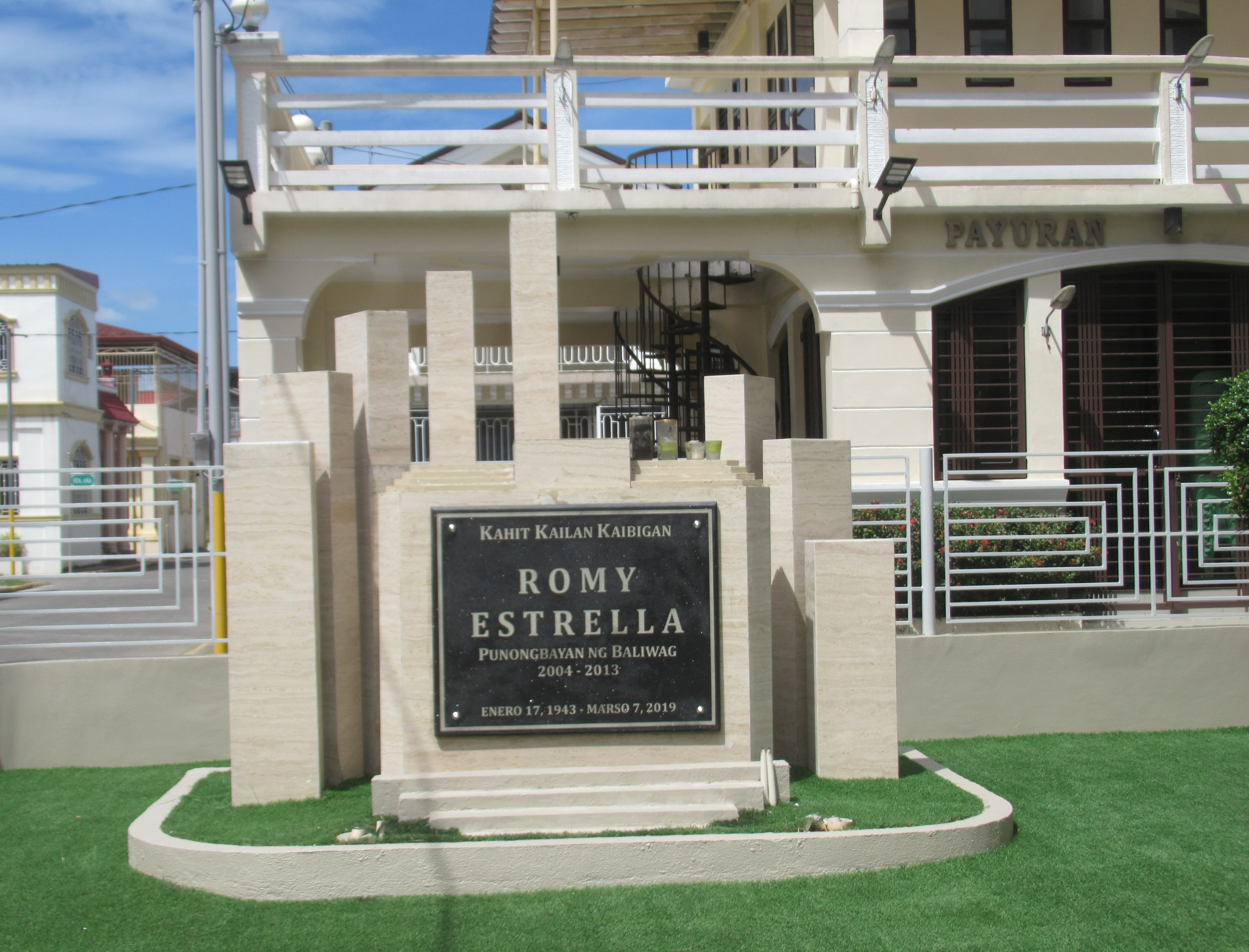
Gate of mausoleum

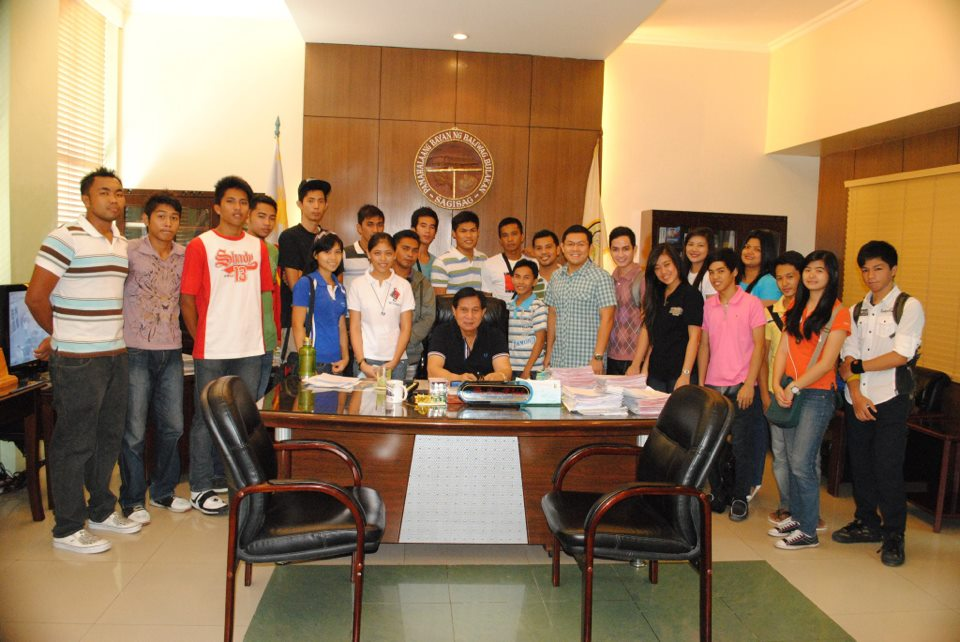
Mayor Romeo M. Estrella
