= SM City Baliwag =

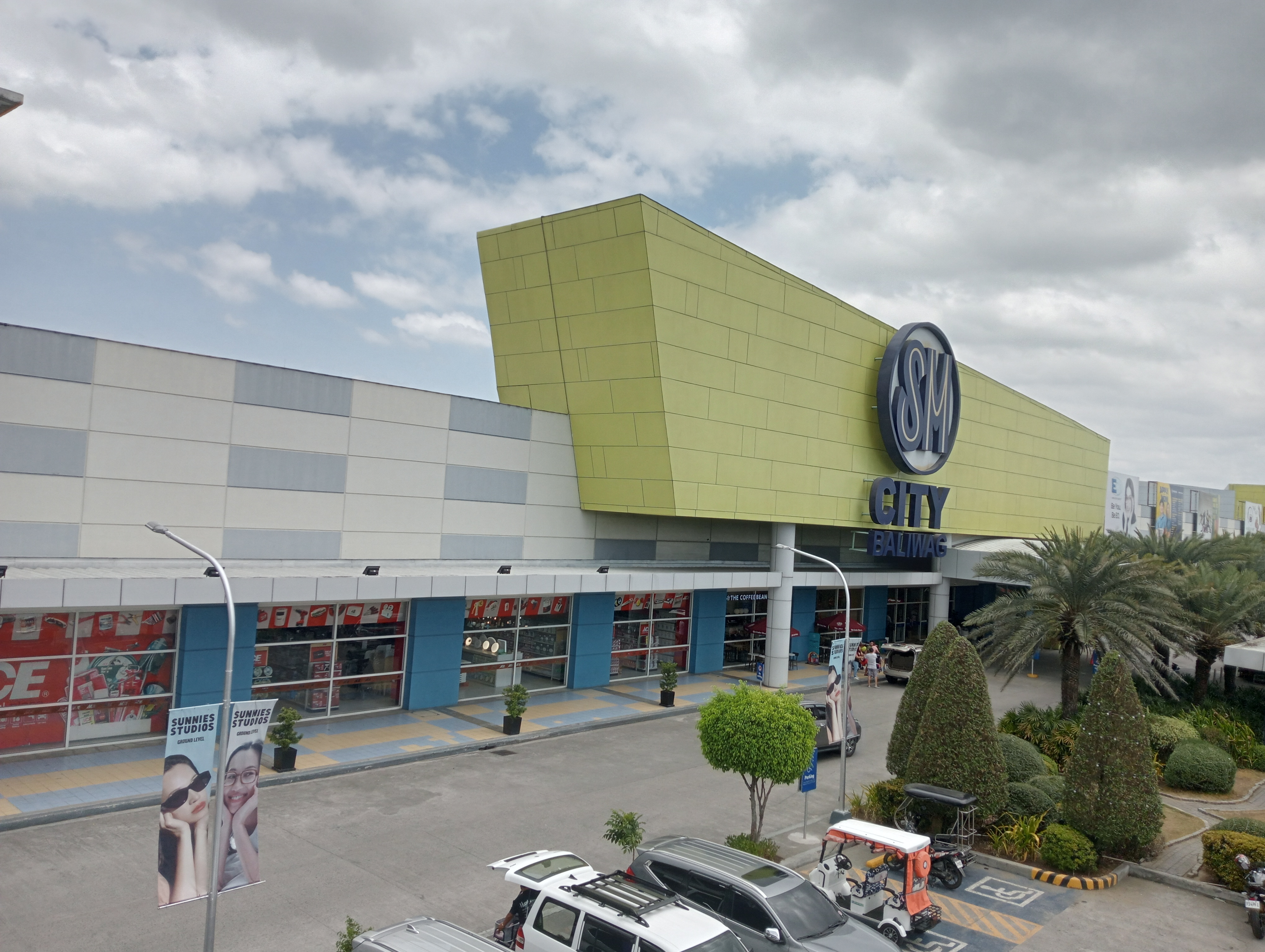
- The facade of SM City Baliwag in 2024
- Location: Baliwag, Bulacan, Philippines
- Coordinates: 14°57′38″N 120°53′27″E
- Address: Doña Remedios Trinidad Highway, Barangay Pagala
- Opened: December 12, 2008; 17 years ago
- Developer: SM Prime Holdings
- Manager: SM Prime Holdings
- Architect: Jose Siao Ling & Associates
- Num. of stores: 300+
- Num. of anchor tenants: 8
- Floor area: 91,000 sq ft (8,500 m^{2})
- Floors: 2
- Parking: 1,000 slots
- Website: SM City Baliwag

SM City Baliwag is a shopping mall in the Philippines owned, developed and operated by SM Prime Holdings. It is the second SM Supermalls in Bulacan province after SM City Marilao, the third and last SM Mall among the company's expansion in 2000 and the 33rd SM Mall in the list. The mall is located at Doña Remedios Trinidad Highway in Barangay Pagala, Baliwag. It opened on December 12, 2008.

The mail's design and construction team includes DSGN Associates, mall designers; Jose Siao Ling and Associates, architect of record; New Golden City Builders, general contractors; and DA Abcede and Associates, project manager.

== National University Baliwag ==
The National University Baliwag, also known as NU Baliwag or NU Bulacan, is the satellite campus of the Manila-based university, also owned mostly by SM Investments, located along Pan-Philippine Highway. The building opened in 2019, hosting the NU Baliwag College of Engineering and Technology and NU Baliwag College of Business and Accountancy.

Preceded by SM City Rosales	33rd SM Supermall; 2008	Succeeded by SM City Naga
