= Baliwag =

Component city in Bulacan, Philippines

- Component city
- City of Baliwag
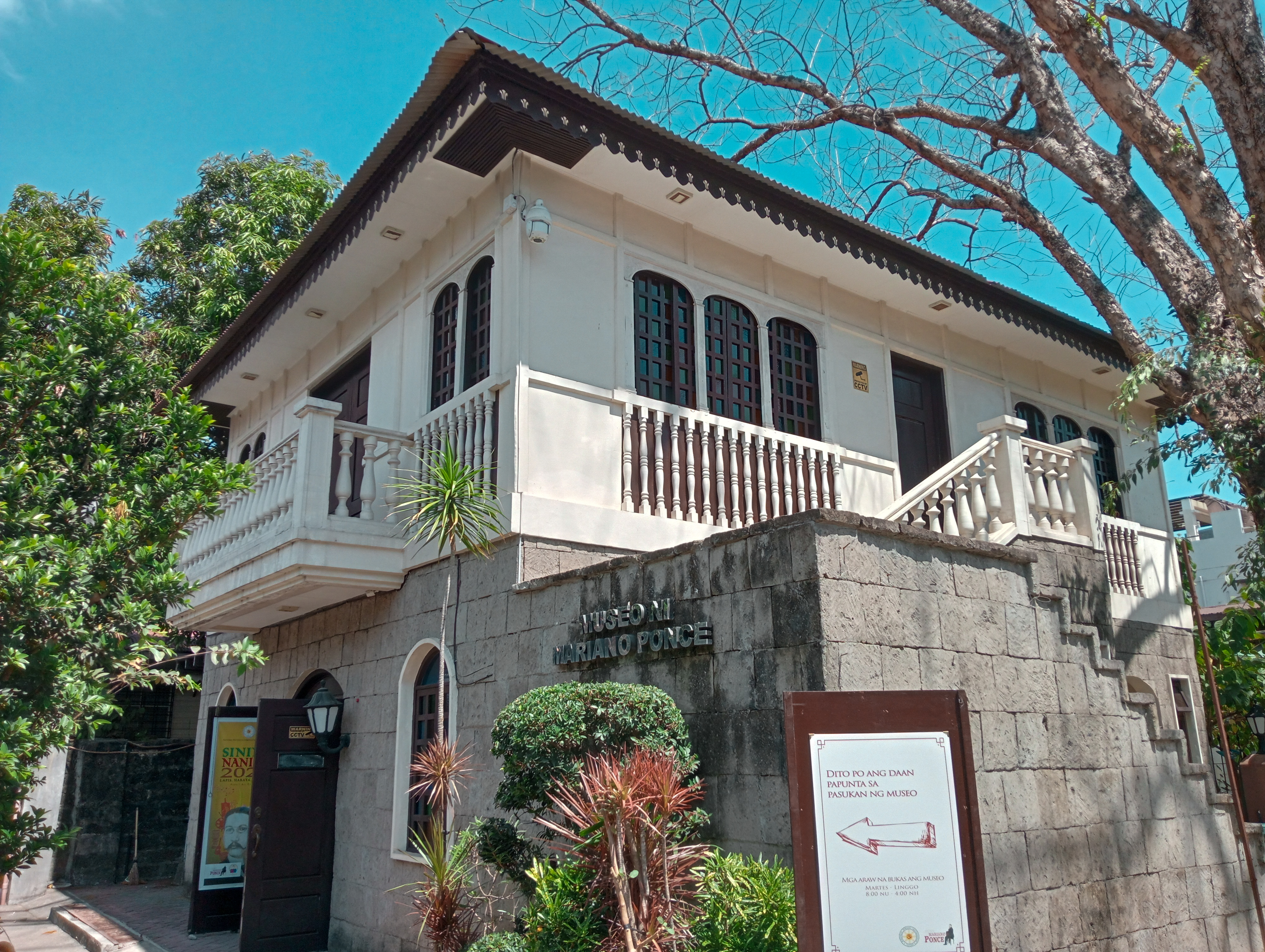
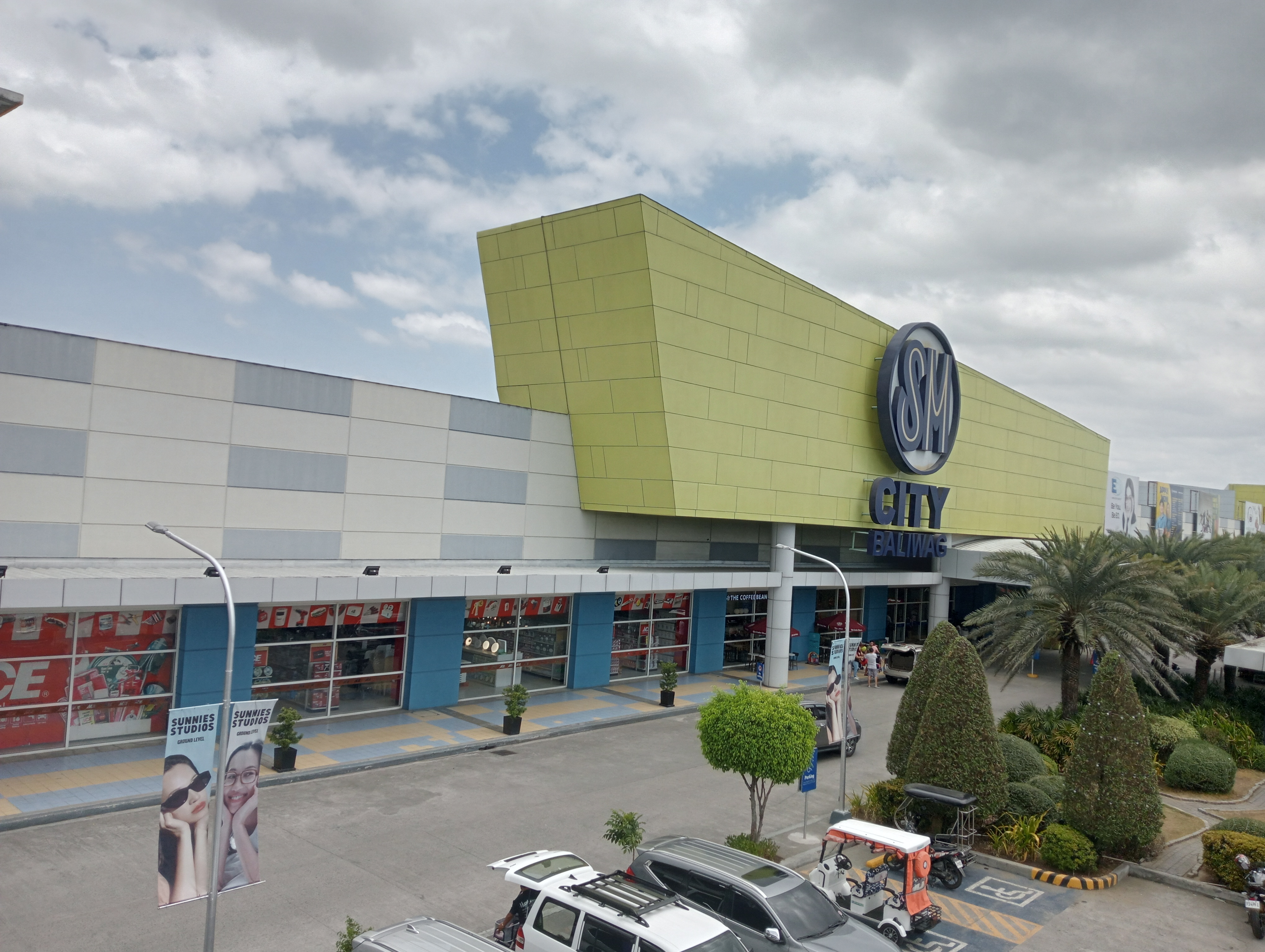
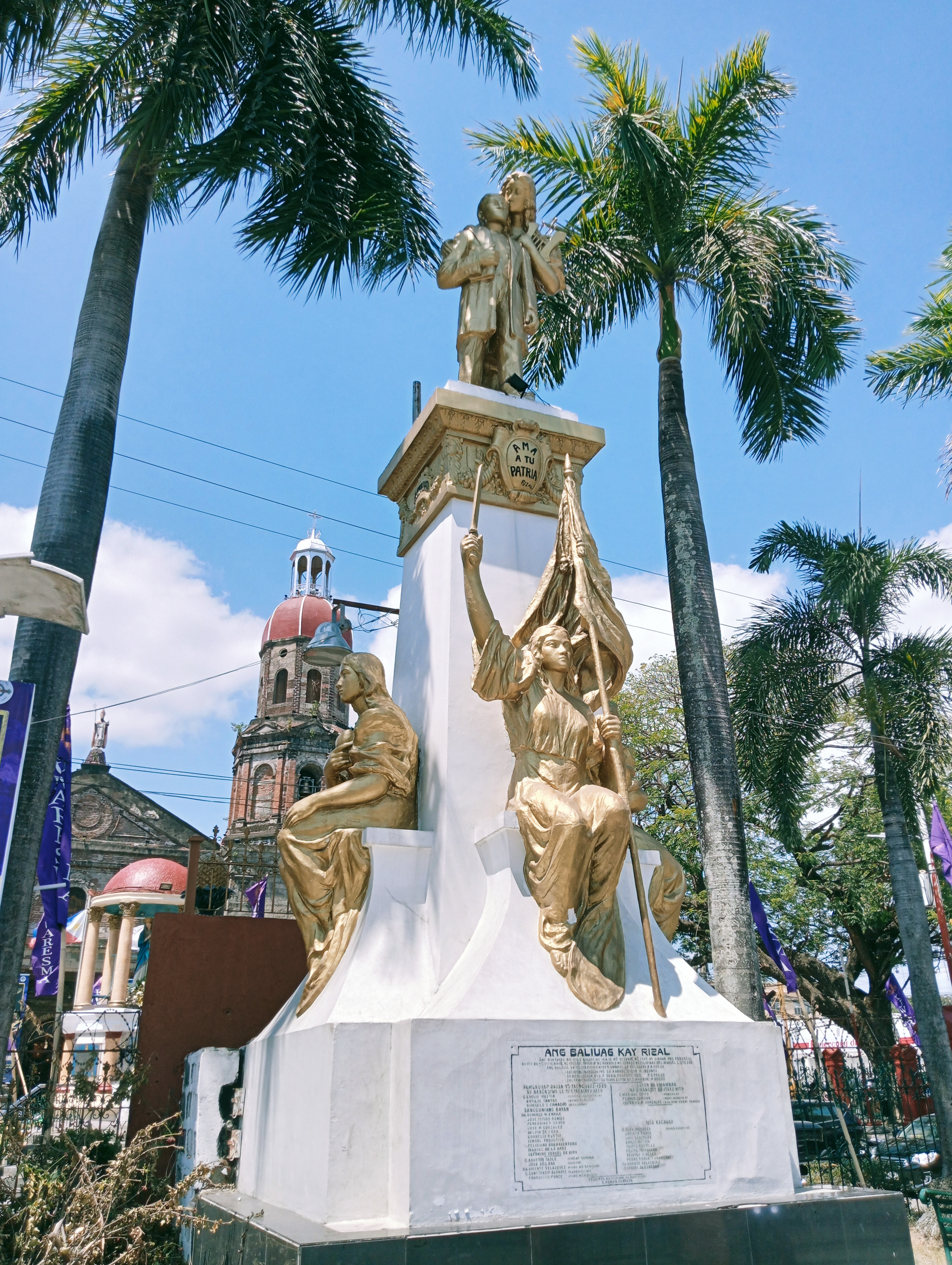
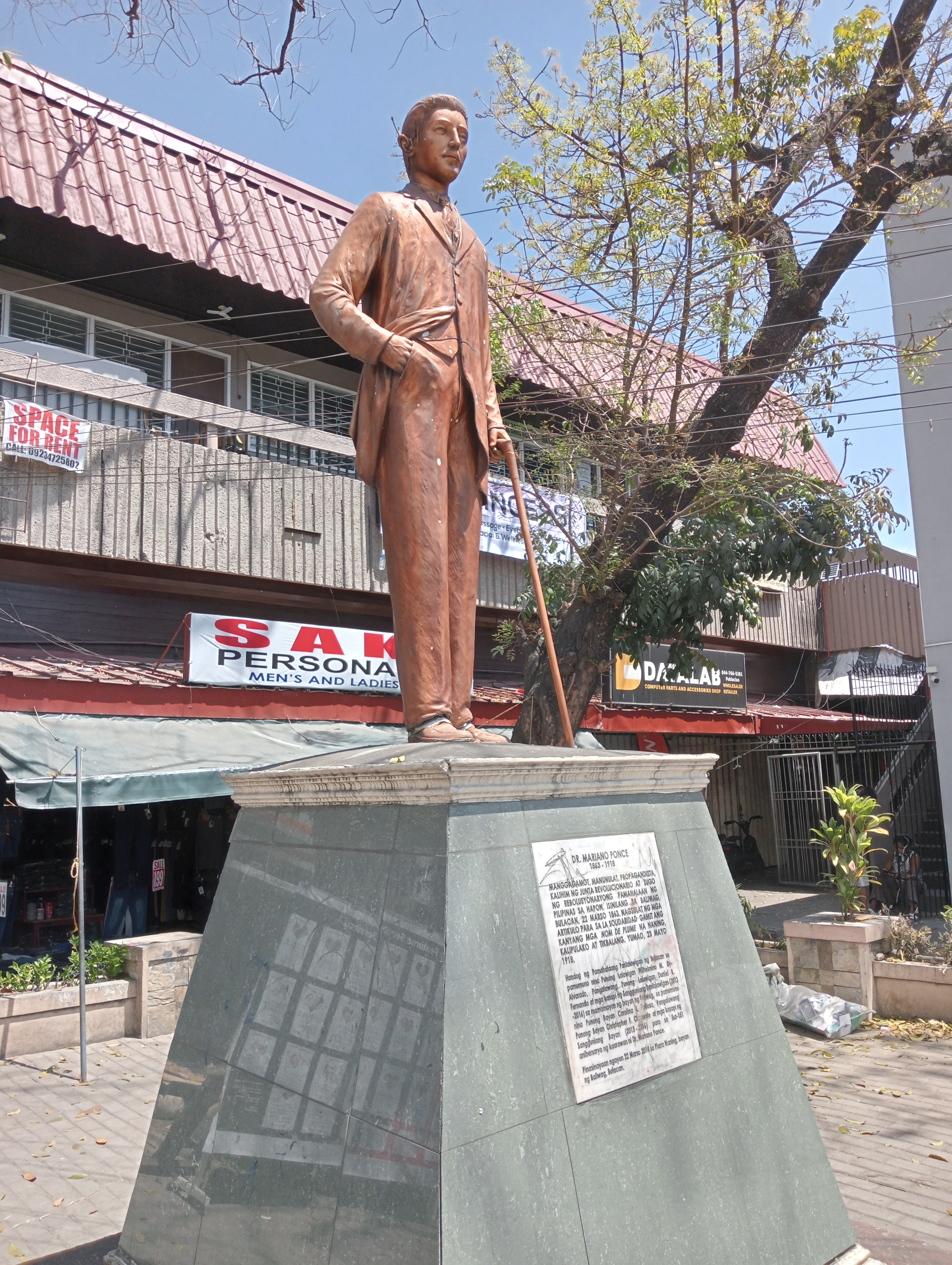
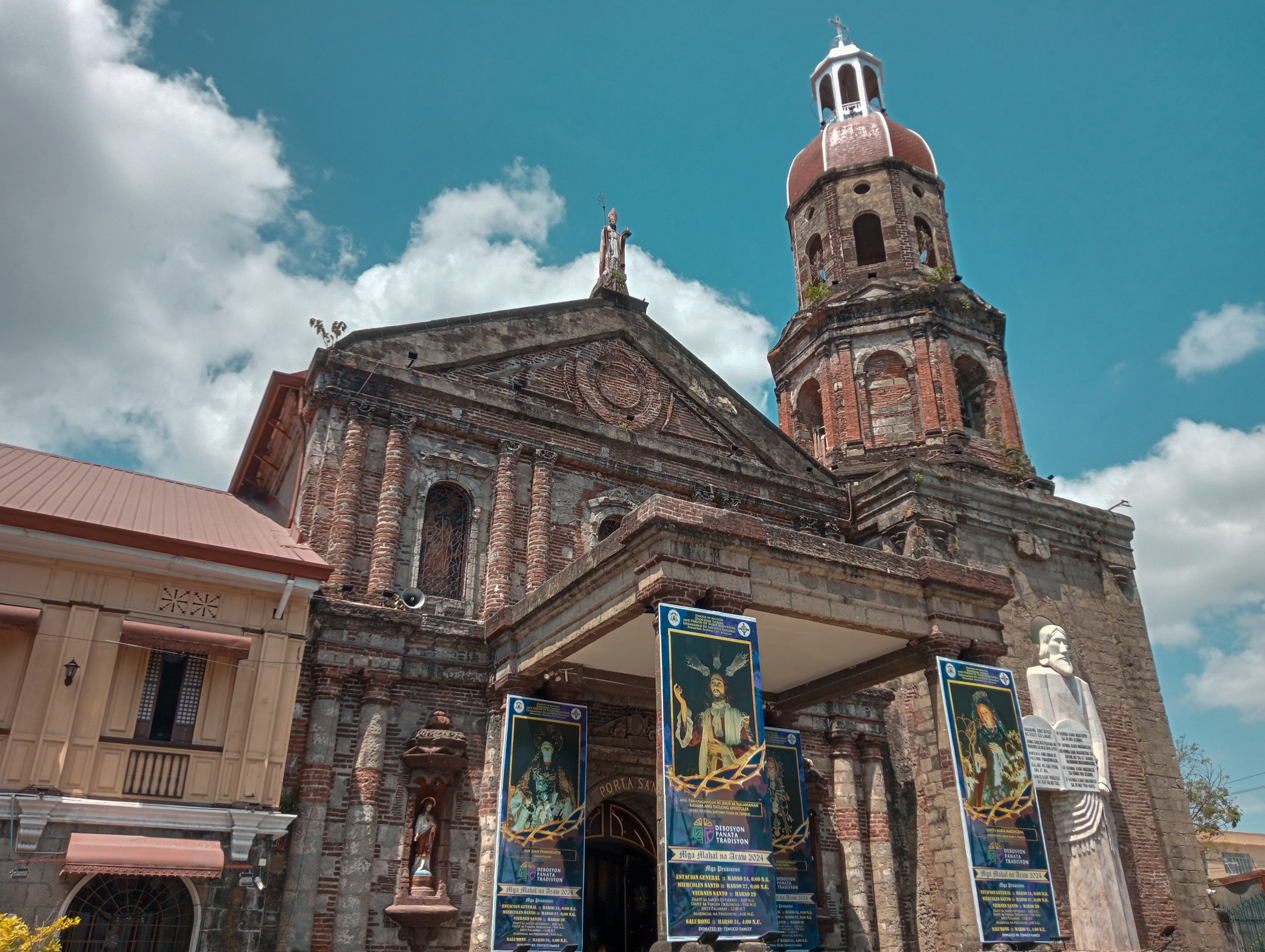
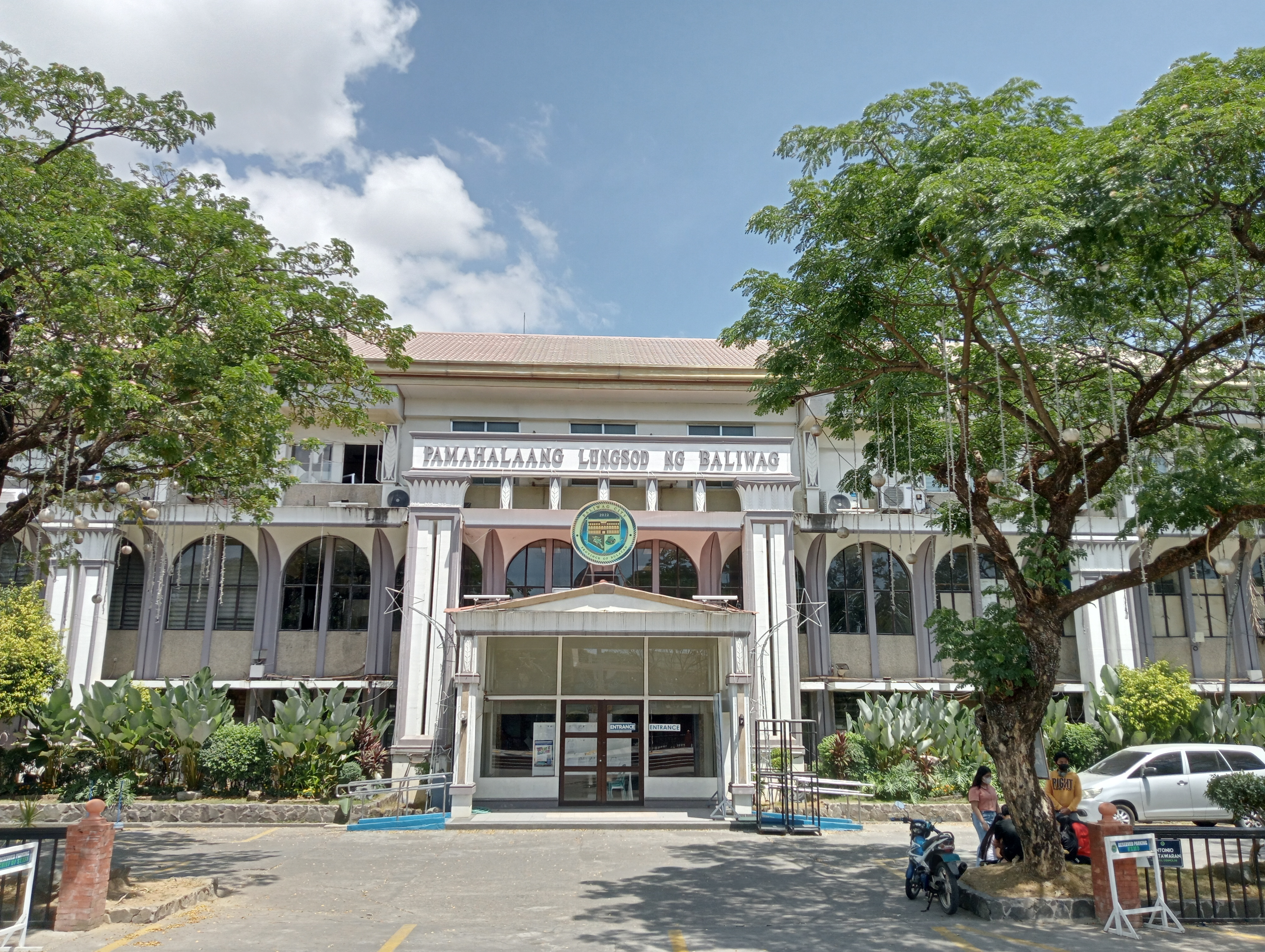
- (From top, left to right): Mariano Ponce Museum • SM City Baliwag • Ang Baliwag kay Rizal Monument • Mariano Ponce Monument • Baliwag Church • Baliwag City Hall

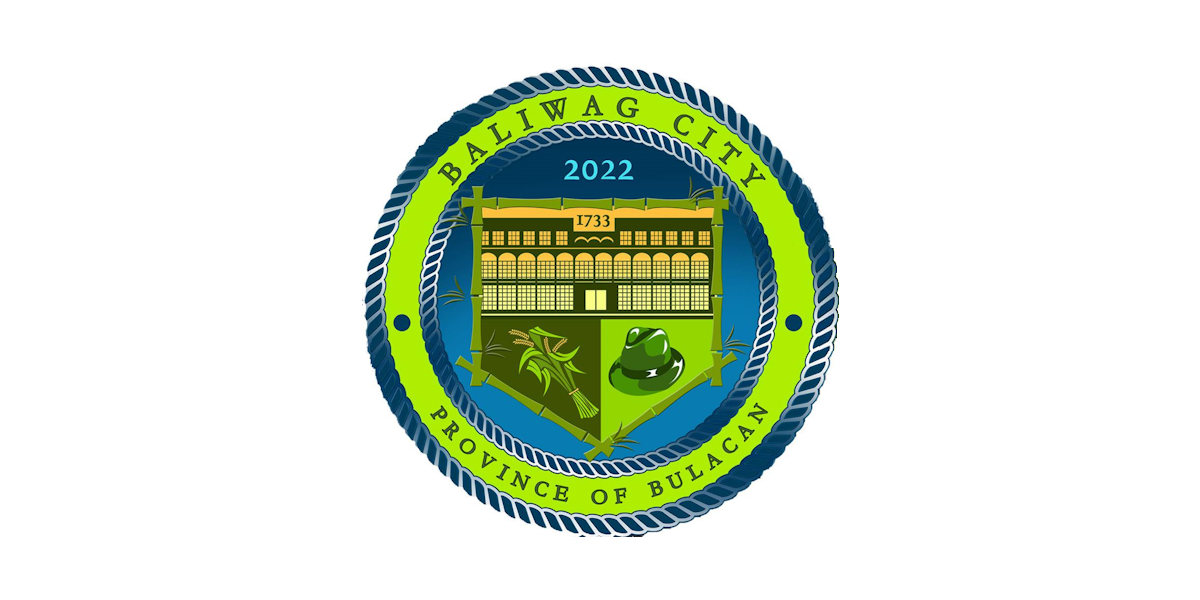
- Flag Seal
- Nickname: Buntal Hat Capital of the Philippines
- Motto: Dugong Baliwag, Pusong Baliwag (English: Baliwag by blood, Baliwag at heart)
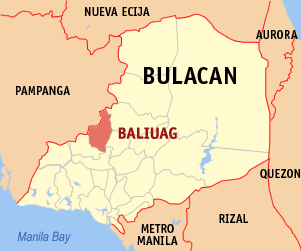
- Map of Bulacan with Baliwag highlighted
- Interactive map of Baliwag
- Location within the Philippines
- Coordinates: 14°57′14″N 120°54′04″E
- Country: Philippines
- Region: Central Luzon
- Province: Bulacan
- District: 2nd district
- Founded: May 26, 1733
- Cityhood: December 17, 2022
- Barangays: 27 (see Barangays)

Government
  - Type: Sangguniang Panlungsod
  - Mayor: Sonia V. Estrella
  - Vice Mayor: Ferdinand V. Estrella
  - Representative: Augustina Dominique C. Pancho
  - City Council: Members: Jose Noel S. Pascual; Rodrigo E. Baltazar; Dr. Katherine A. Angelo-Dela Cruz; Ron Harold P. Cruz; Marie Nelle S. Imperial; Karlo Kenneth M. Cruz; Lowell C. Tagle; Antonio S. Patawaran; Dr. Carolina L. Dellosa; Andronicus O. Cruz
  - Electorate: 114,839 voters (2025)

Area
  - Total: 45.05 km^{2} (17.39 sq mi)
- Elevation: 18 m (59 ft)
- Highest elevation: 44 m (144 ft)
- Lowest elevation: 8 m (26 ft)

Population (2024 census)
  - Total: 174,194
  - Density: 3,867/km^{2} (10,010/sq mi)
  - Households: 43,789
- Demonyms: Baliwageño (male); Baliwageña (female); Baliwagenean

Economy
  - Poverty incidence: 9.47% (2023)
  - Revenue: ₱ 1,307 million (2024)
  - Assets: ₱ 2,301 million (2024)
  - Expenditure: ₱ 1,225 million (2024)
  - Liabilities: ₱ 1,087 million (2024)

Utilities
  - Electricity: Meralco
  - Water: Baliwag Water District
- Time zone: UTC+8 (PST)
- ZIP code: 3006
- PSGC: 0301403000
- IDD : area code: +63 (0)44
- Native languages: Tagalog; Kapampangan

Baliwag, officially the City of Baliwag (Filipino: Lungsod ng Baliwag, Tagalog: [bɐˈliʊag]; Kapampangan: Lakanbalen ning Baliwag/Siudad ning Baliwag), is a component city in the province of Bulacan, Philippines. According to the 2024 census, it has a population of 174,194 people.

The name Baliwag is derived from an old Kapampangan word meaning "untouched". The Kapampangan and Hispanicized spellings are used differently by locals: Baliwag refers to the entire city and is used in official documents, while Baliuag refers specifically to the downtown or población (commonly called Baliuag Bayan or Baliuag Loób). The settlement was founded in 1732 by Augustinian friars and was incorporated by Governor-General of the Philippines Fernándo Valdés Tamón on May 26, 1733. It was carved out of the town of Quingua (now Plaridel).

During the Spanish colonial period, Baliuag was predominantly agricultural, with rice farming serving as the principal source of livelihood. Orchards and tumanas produced fruits and vegetables that were sold in the public market. Commerce and industry also contributed significantly to the local economy. Baliuag became known for buntal hat weaving, silk weaving, the manufacture of cigar cases, piña fiber products, petates (mats), and sillas de bejuco (cane chairs), many of which were exported. The local market also expanded, and by the early 19th century, Baliuag was considered one of the most progressive and prosperous towns in Bulacan. The growth of the public market significantly transformed the town's economy.

Baliwag is the major commercial, transportation, entertainment, and educational center of northern Bulacan.

On July 22, 2022, Republic Act No. 11929 lapsed into law, converting the municipality into a component city and standardizing its name as the City of Baliwag. A plebiscite was held on December 17, 2022, in which 17,814 residents voted in favor of cityhood, while 5,702 voted against.

== History ==
Fr. Joaquín Martínez de Zúñiga, OSA, in his 1803 Historia de las Islas Filipinas wrote that the convento or parochial house of San Agustín in Baliuag is the best in the whole archipelago and no edifice in Manila can be compared to it in symmetry and beauty amid its towering belfry, having been a viewing point for the town's panorama. The friar further stated that the convento was a repository of priceless parish records that dated to the founding of Baliuag as a pueblo or parroquia by the Augustinians in 1733; the first convento was built in Barangay Santa Barbara before the main church was formally erected to form the nucleus of the modern población.

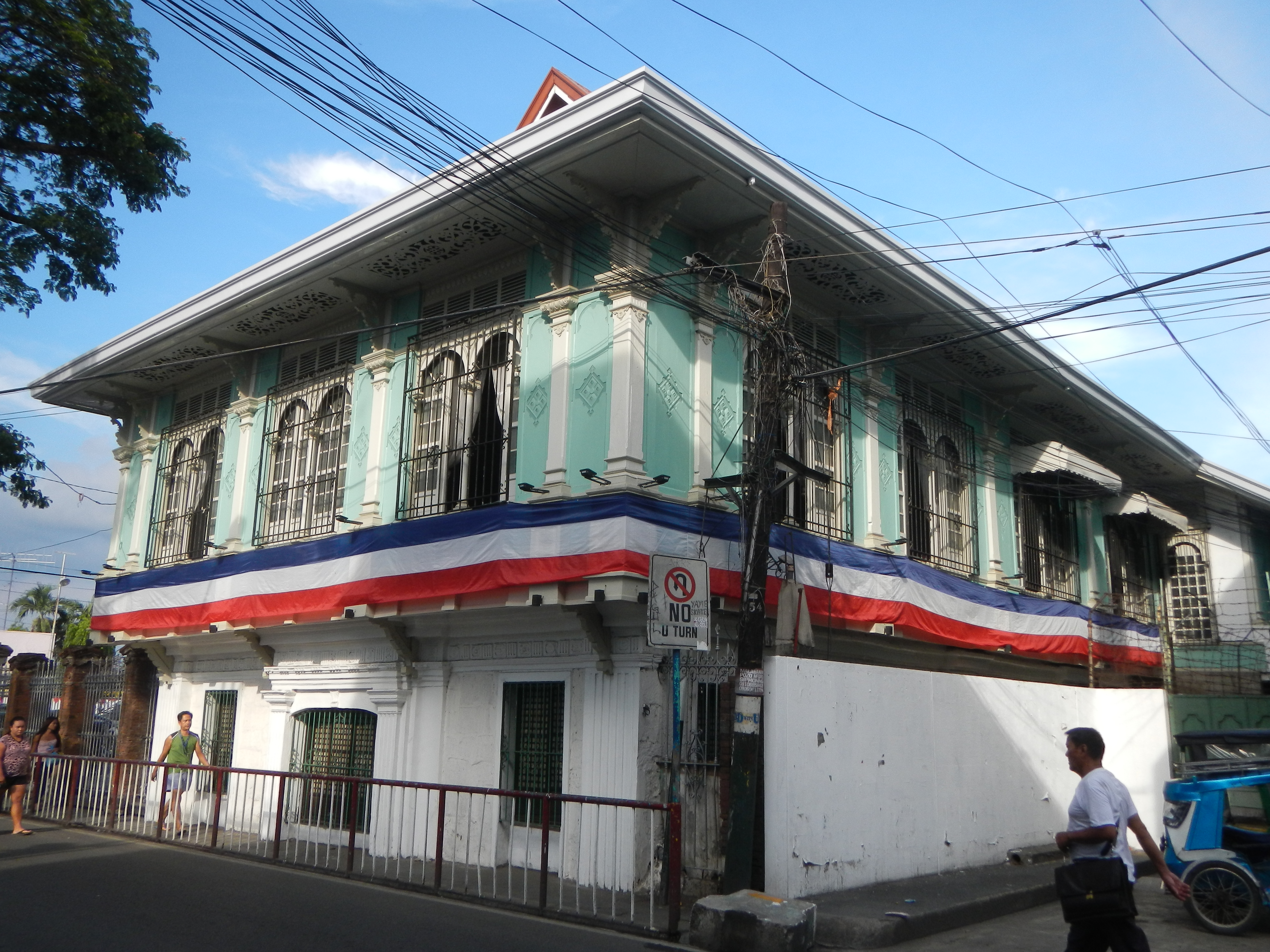
Lumang Municipio ("old municipal hall"), now the Baliwag Museum and Library).

Fr. Joaquín Martínez de Zúñiga arrived in the Philippines on August 3, 1786, and visited Baliuag on February 17, 1802, with Ignacio María de Álava y Sáenz de Navarrete. Their host was Baliuag's Parish Priest, Fray Esteban Díez Hidalgo. Díez served as the longest cura párroco of Baliuag from 1789, having built the church and convento from 1790 to 1801.

The Apuntes históricos de la provincia augustiniana del Santísimo Nombre de Jesús de Filipinas reveal that Fr. Juan de Albarran, OSA was assigned parish priest of Baliuag in 1733. The first baptism in Baliuag Church was ordered by Fr. Lector and Fr. Feliz Trillo, Provincial of the Province on June 7, 1733, while Baliuag was founded and began its de jure existence on May 26, 1733. The pueblo or town was created in the provincial Chapter on May 15, 1734, with the appointment of Fr. Manuel Bazeta/Baseta as first cura párroco.

In 1769–1774, Baliuag Church was built by Father Gregorio Giner. The present structure (the third such structure after damage during the 1880 Luzon earthquakes) was later rebuilt by Father Esteban Díez using mortar and stone. The 1866 Belfry was also completed by Father Matías Novoa but the July 19, 1880, quake damaged the same which was later repaired by Father Tomás Gresa.

The earthquake of June 3, 1863, one of the strongest to ever hit Manila, destroyed the Palacio del Gobernador in Intramuros, necessitating the Governor-General moving to Malacañang Palace, which remains the residence of the Philippine head of state. The massive quake also damaged Baliuag Church. In 1870, the reconstruction began when a temporary house of worship, the provincial along Año 1733 Street, became a narrow and simple edifice which was later used by the Religious of the Virgin Mary as a classroom for their Colegio de la Sagrada Familia (now St. Mary's College of Baliuag). Antonio de Mesa, “Maestrong Tonio" fabricated the parts to have finished the Spanish-era Baliuag Church.

Baliwag was the tenth town founded by the Augustinians in the province of Bulacan.

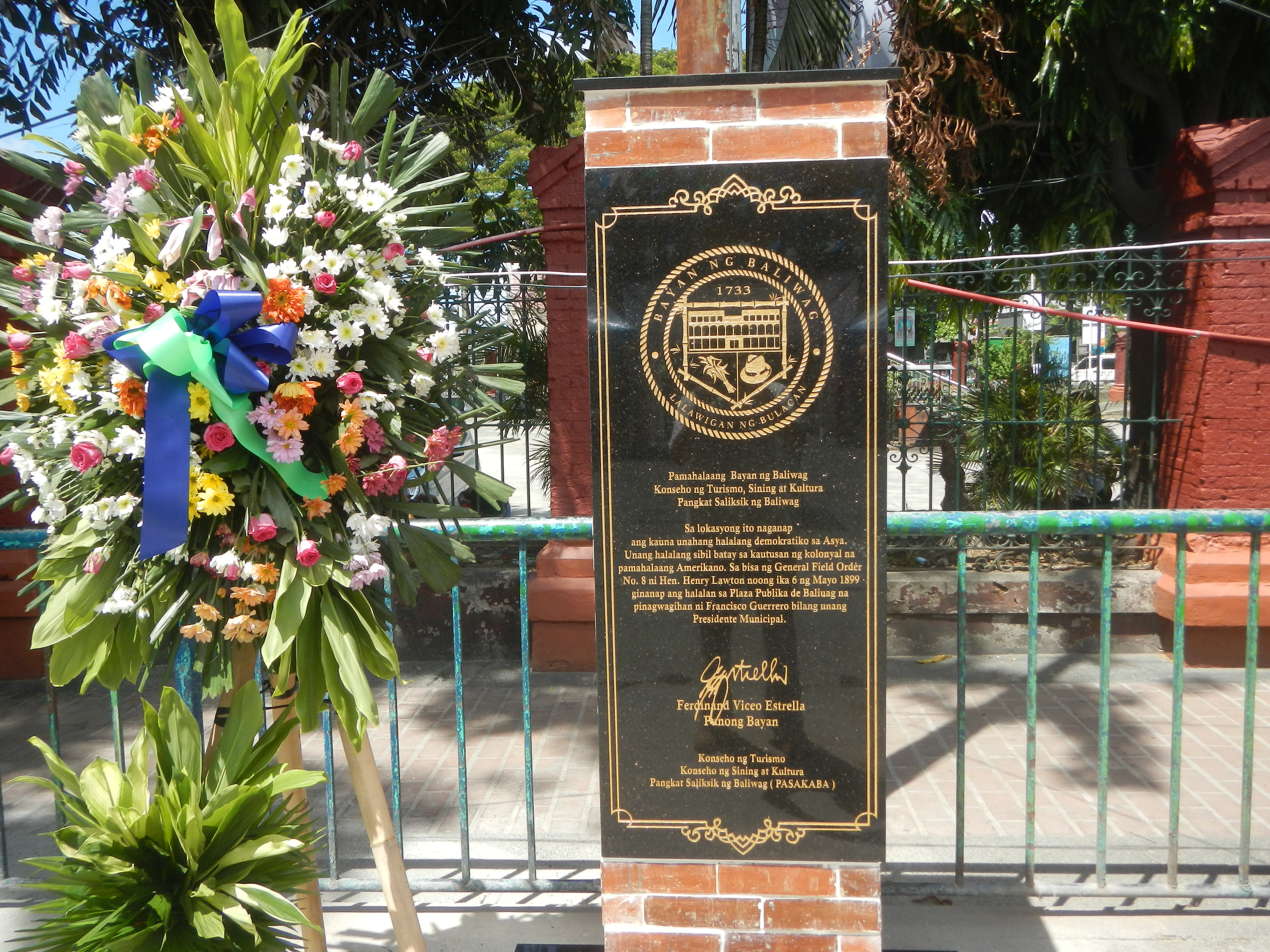
Plaza Baliwag 1899 election marker

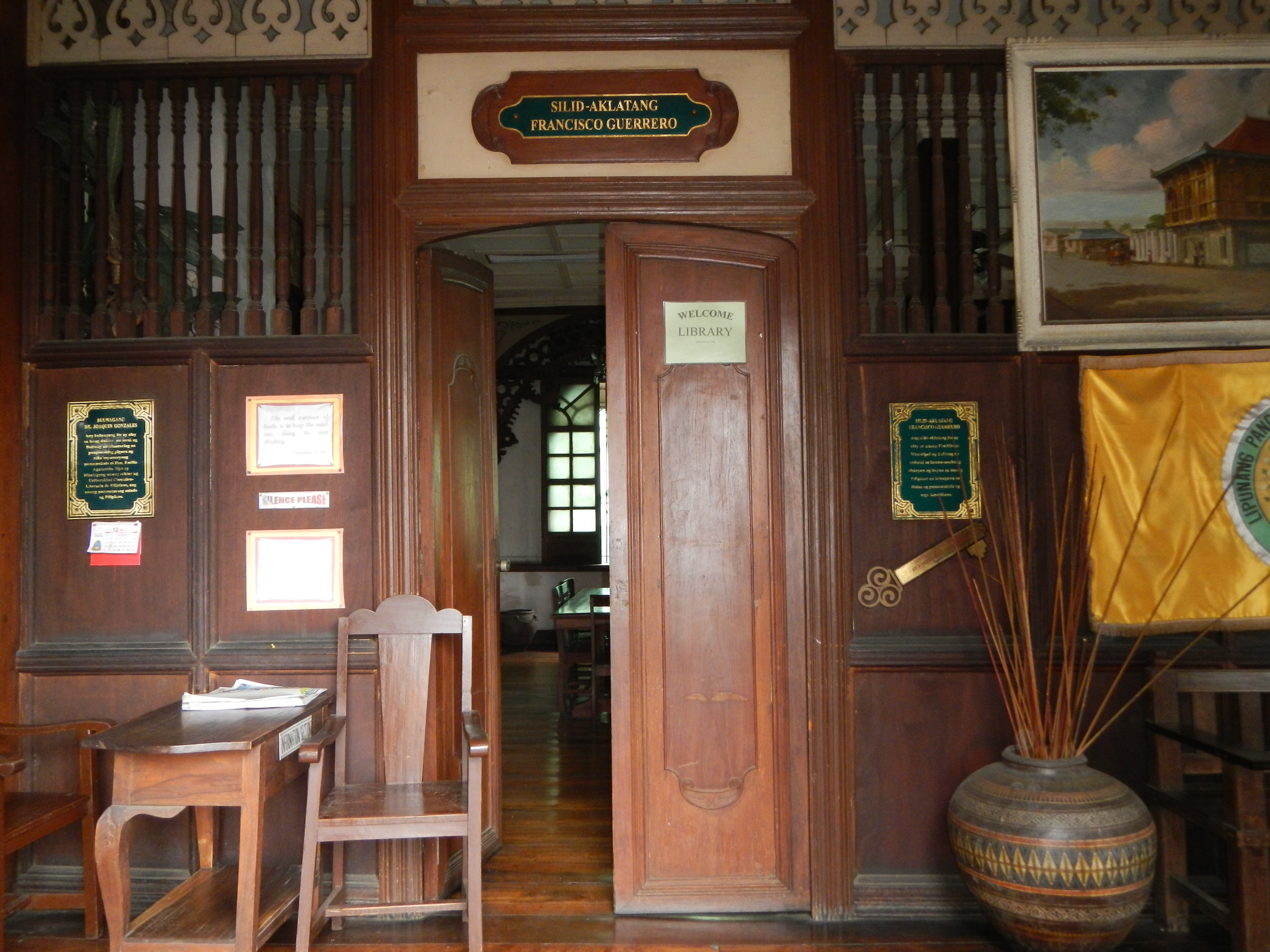
Bulwagang Francisco Guerrero

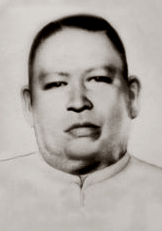
Francisco Guerrero

=== First Municipio ===
Baliuag had 30 curates from 1733 to the end of Spanish rule in 1898: Fr. Esteban Díez Hidalgo and Fr. Fausto López served 40 and 24 years, respectively. Against his vow of celibacy, Fr. López fathered six children with a certain native named Mariquita, which include José (the eldest known by the matronymic “Pepeng Mariquita"), Dr. Joaquín Gonzalez, Francisco, the former Assemblyman Ricardo Lloret w (Legislative districts of Bulacan, 5th Philippine Legislature). Spanish cura párroco Fr. Ysidoro Prada served in Baliuag during the last decade of the Spaniard regime.

The American Military Government supervised the first municipal elections, having chosen Baliuag as the site of the 1899 Philippine local elections held On May 7, 1899. Francisco Guererro was elected the First Presidente Municipal. The Filipinos gathered at the plaza of the San Agustín Church after Holy Mass, and thereafter the officials were selected based on the qualifications for voters set by the Americans.

The first town Gobernadorcillo (using the 1789 title) of Baliuag was Captain José de Guzmán. He was assisted by the Tribunal's teniente mayor (chief lieutenant), juez de ganadas (judge of the cattle), juez de sementeras (judge of the field) and juez de policía (judge of the police). In the History of the Philippines (1521–1898), the 1893 Maura Law, the title of Gobernadorcillo became capitán municipal and that of each juez to teniente. From Baliuag's independence from Quingua (now Plaridel, Bulacan) until 1898, 49 served as capitán, 13 alcalde and 92 as Gobernadorcillo. Félix de Lara (1782) and Agustín de Castro (1789) were the first alcalde and Gobernadorcillo, respectively. Municipal President Fernando Enrile, in 1908, honored some of these officials, even naming some of Baliuag’s calles for them, but these civil officials were nonetheless subject to the influence of the Augustinian parish priests.

=== Don Mariano Ponce ===
Mariano Ponce, a native of Baliuag, was among the founders of the Propaganda Movement together with José Rizal and Marcelo del Pilar. Ponce was also former assemblyman of the second district of Bulacan to the Philippine Assembly; and the co-founder of La Solidaridad with fellow co-founder Graciano López-Jaena. His most common names are Naning (hence the name of Plaza Naning); Kalipulako, named after the Cebuano hero Lapulapu; and Tagibalang or Tigbalang (Tikbalang), a supernatural being in Filipino folklore.

=== American period ===
The local government of Baliuag used as first Municipio under the American regime (History of the Philippines (1898–1946)) the Mariano Yoyongko (Gobernadorcillo in 1885) Principalia in población (now a part of the market site), which it bought from Yoyongko.

On September 15, 1915, Baliuag municipality bought the heritage mansion and a lot of Dr. Joaquín González. The old mansion served as Lumang Municipio (the Old Municipio or Town Hall Building, as the seat of the local government) for 65 years. It is now the Baliuag Museum and Library.

Baliuag produced not less than 30 priests, including three during the Spanish period Dominicans, and two Jesuits in the American regime.

Jeorge Allan R. Tengco and Amy R. Tengco (wife of Lito S. Tengco), philanthropists, owners of Baliwag Transit and other chains of business establishments had been conferred the Papal Orders of Chivalry October 3, 2000 Pro Ecclesia et Pontifice and the 2012 Dame of the Order of St. Gregory the Great awards.

=== Fifth Republic ===
On June 16, 1995, communist guerrilla Melencio Salamat Jr., a local leader of the New People's Army (NPA) in Bulacan, surrendered to the authorities along with 94 other members of the NPA at the Baliwag municipal building. Prior to the surrender, Salamat's group was responsible for collecting "revolutionary taxes" from residents along the coastal towns of Bulacan, and had chosen to give up arms after NPA officials were killed on April 28 in Barangay Catulinan, Baliwag.

=== Cityhood ===
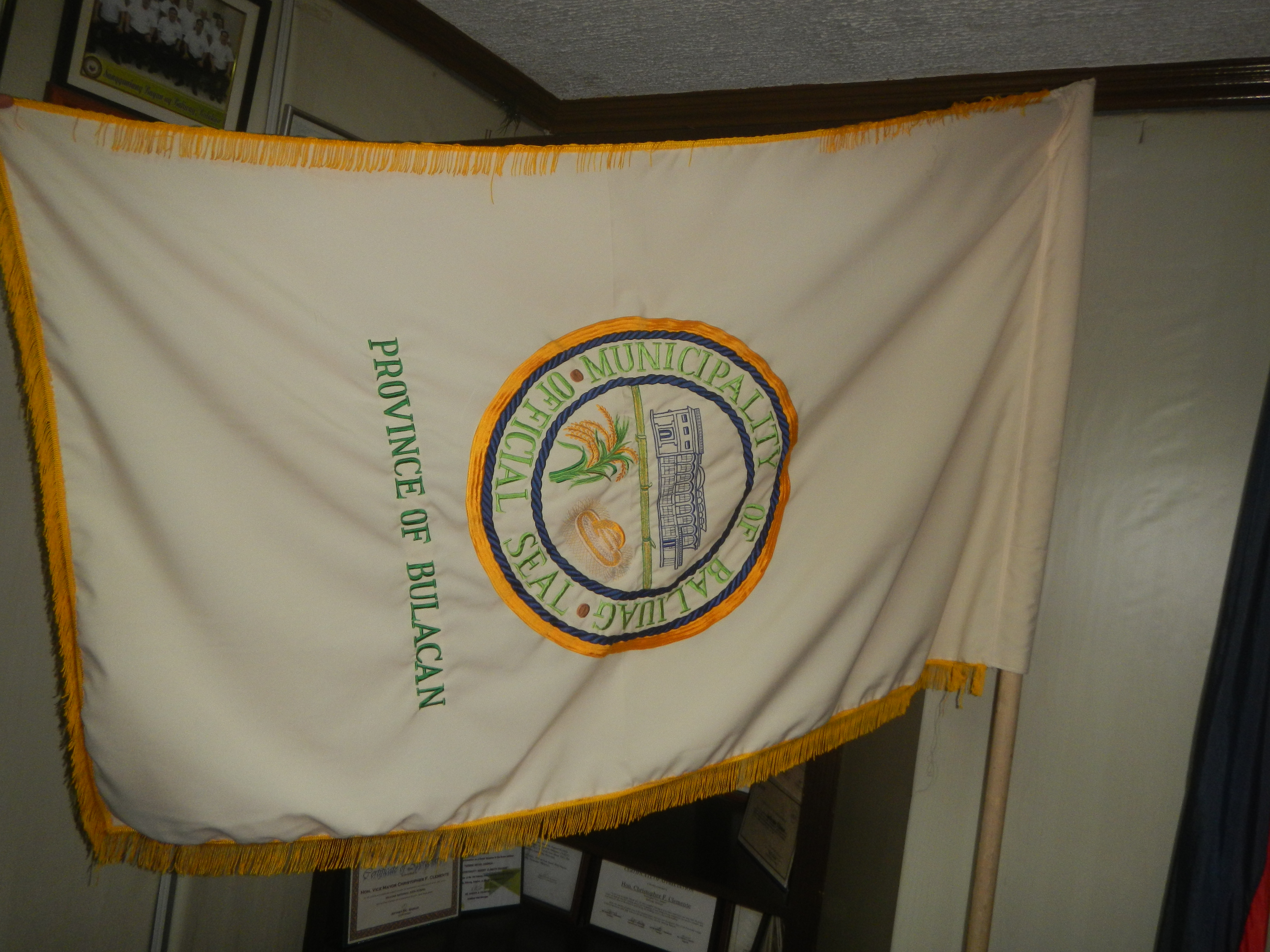
Former flag of Baliwag used until 2022, before cityhood

In 2018, the Sangguniang Bayan filed a resolution to request Bulacan 2nd District Representative Gavini Pancho, to file a house bill to convert Baliuag into a city.

Representatives Eric Go Yap (ACT-CIS Partylist) and Paolo Duterte (Davao City–1st) filed House Bill No. 7362, seeking to convert Baliuag into a city. House Bill No. 7362 was filed last August 12, 2020, for the conversion of the municipality of Baliuag into a component city in the province of Bulacan. House Bill No. 10444, filed by the three aforementioned representatives, was concurred by the Senate and submitted to the President for signature on June 29, 2022, a day before the end of the 18th Congress.

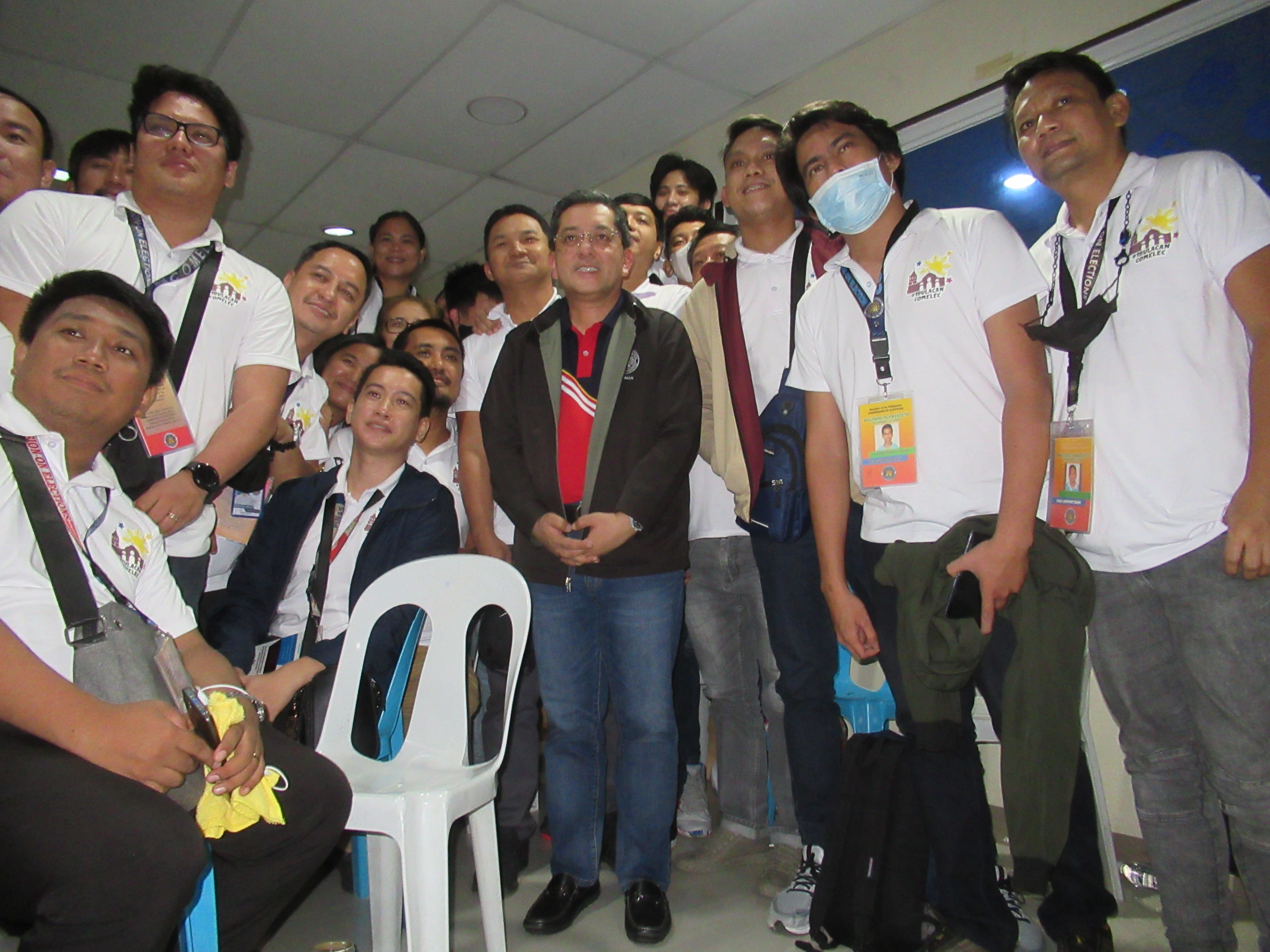
COMELEC Chairman George Garcia visits Baliwag cityhood poll personnel

The bill lapsed into law without the President's signature on July 30, 2022 as Republic Act No. 11929. The plebiscite was originally set by the Commission on Elections on January 14, 2023, but its date was later moved to December 17, 2022, following the postponement of the December 2022 Barangay and Sangguniang Kabataan Elections to October 2023.

Despite having a low voter turnout, majority of participated voters ratified the cityhood, making Baliwag the Bulacan's fourth component city and the country's 148th.

Baliwag cityhood plebiscite
Choice	Votes	%
For	17,814	75.75
Against	5,702	24.25
Total	23,516	100.00
Valid votes	23,516	99.80
Invalid/blank votes	46	0.20
Total votes	23,562	100.00
Registered voters/turnout	108,572	21.70
Source: Press statement from the COMELEC . news article from CNN Philippines

== Geography ==
With the continuous expansion of Metro Manila, Baliwag is part of Manila's built-up area which reaches San Ildefonso, Bulacan at its northernmost part.

Baliwag is 28 kilometres (17 mi) from Malolos, 51 kilometres (32 mi) from Manila, and 8 kilometres (5.0 mi) from Pulilan.

=== Barangays ===
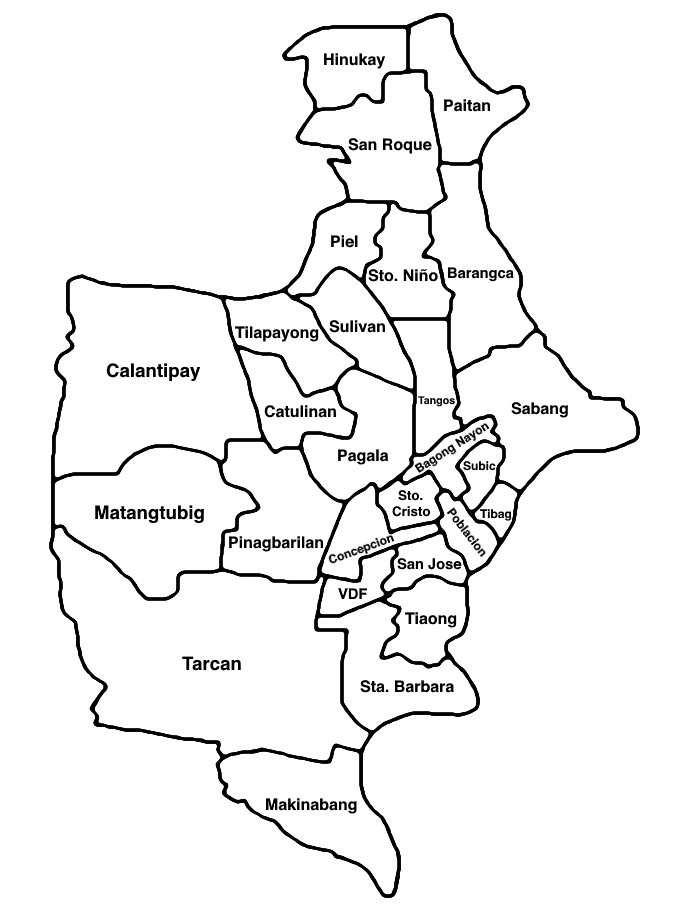
A white map of the City of Baliwag, with the names of its 27 barangays.

Baliwag is politically subdivided into 27 barangays, as shown in the matrix below. Each barangay consists of puroks and some have sitios.

PSGC	Barangay	Population			±% p.a.	
		2024		2010		
031403001	Bagong Nayon	3.2%	5,616	5,994	▾	−0.45%
031403002	Barangca	1.8%	3,051	2,742	▴	0.74%
031403003	Calantipay	1.6%	2,784	2,613	▴	0.44%
031403004	Catulinan	1.1%	1,916	1,769	▴	0.55%
031403005	Concepcion	5.7%	9,933	9,585	▴	0.25%
031403006	Hinukay	1.2%	2,140	1,419	▴	2.87%
031403007	Makinabang	6.7%	11,715	11,196	▴	0.31%
031403008	Matangtubig	1.5%	2,630	2,859	▾	−0.57%
031403010	Pagala	2.2%	3,843	3,139	▴	1.40%
031403011	Paitan	0.9%	1,517	1,440	▴	0.36%
031403012	Piel	1.3%	2,229	1,955	▴	0.91%
031403013	Pinagbarilan	3.1%	5,357	5,178	▴	0.23%
031403014	Poblacion	5.4%	9,448	9,668	▾	−0.16%
031403016	Sabang	6.5%	11,350	11,960	▾	−0.36%
031403017	San Jose	3.8%	6,575	5,346	▴	1.44%
031403018	San Roque	2.0%	3,554	3,402	▴	0.30%
031403019	Santa Barbara	6.7%	11,676	11,568	▴	0.06%
031403020	Santo Cristo	5.1%	8,840	8,650	▴	0.15%
031403021	Santo Niño	2.2%	3,818	3,470	▴	0.66%
031403022	Subic	3.2%	5,506	4,550	▴	1.32%
031403023	Sulivan	2.9%	5,070	4,776	▴	0.41%
031403024	Tangos	3.3%	5,699	5,578	▴	0.15%
031403025	Tarcan	4.2%	7,333	6,892	▴	0.43%
031403026	Tiaong	2.9%	5,006	4,903	▴	0.14%
031403027	Tibag	1.7%	3,014	3,746	▾	−1.49%
031403028	Tilapayong	1.9%	3,389	2,494	▴	2.14%
031403030	Virgen delas Flores	4.0%	6,945	6,673	▴	0.28%
	Total		174,194	143,565	▴	1.34%

=== Feast and Patron Saints of each Barangays ===
Barangay	Patron	Feast Day	Parish
Bagong Nayon	Our Mother of Perpetual Help	June 27	Diocesan Shrine and Parish of St. Augustine - Baliwag
Barangka	Nuestro Padre Jesus Nazareno	January 9	Sagrada Famila Parish - Tangos
Calantipay	Nuestra Señora dela Paz y Buen Viaje	May 2	Nuestra Señora delas Flores Parish - Virgen Delas Flores
Catulinan	San Roque	August 16	Sagrada Familia Parish - Tangos
Concepcion	Immaculate Conception	December 8	Immaculate Conception Parish - Concepcion
Hinukay	San Roque	August 16	Sagrada Familia Parish - Tangos
Makinabang	Our Lady of the Most Holy Rosary	October 7	Our Lady of the Most Holy Rosary Parish - Makinabang
Matangtubig	Sagrada Familia	Sunday after Christmas	Nuestra Señora delas Flores Parish - Virgen Delas Flores
Pagala	San Isidro Labrador	May 15	Sagrada Familia Parish - Tangos
Paitan	St. James the Great	July 25	Sagrada Familia Parish - Tangos
Piel	St. Anthony of Padua	June 13	Sagrada Familia Parish - Tangos
Pinagbarilan	St. Lucy of Syracuse	December 13	Nuestra Señora delas Flores Parish - Virgen Delas Flores
Poblacion	St. Augustine of Hippo	August 27	Diocesan Shrine and Parish of St. Augustine - Baliwag
Sabang	St. Helena	May 5	Our Lady of Mt. Carmel Parish - Sabang
San Jose	St. Joseph, Spouse of Virgin Mary	March 19	Diocesan Shrine and Parish of St. Augustine - Baliwag
San Roque	San Roque	August 16	Sagrada Familia Parish - Tangos
Santa Barbara	Sta. Barbara	December 4	Our Lady of the Most Holy Rosary Parish
Santo Cristo	Señor Sto. Cristo	May 3	Diocesan Shrine and Parish of St. Augustine - Baliwag
Santo Niño	Sto. Niño	Third Sunday of January	Sagrada Familia Parish - Tangos
Subic	Our Lady of Lourdes	February 11	Diocesan Shrine and Parish of St. Augustine - Baliwag
Sulivan	Our Lady of Fatima	May 13	Sagrada Familia Parish - Tangos
Tangos	Holy Family	Sunday after Christmas	Sagrada Familia Parish - Tangos
Tarcan	Sacred Heart of Jesus	Friday after Corpus Cristi	Our Lady of the Most Holy Rosary Parish - Makinabang
Tiaong	St. Augustine of Hippo	August 27	Nuestra Señora delas Flores Parish - Virgen Delas Flores
Tibag	Nuestra Señora dela Paz y Buen Viaje	Last Sunday of May	Diocesan Shrine and Parish of St. Augustine
Tilapayong	St. Augustine of Hippo	August 27	Sagrada Familia Parish - Tangos
Virgen Delas Flores	Nuestra Señora delas Flores	Last Sunday of May	Nuestra Señora delas Flores Parish - Virgen Delas Flores

=== Climate ===
Climate data for Baliwag
Month	Jan	Feb	Mar	Apr	May	Jun	Jul	Aug	Sep	Oct	Nov	Dec	Year
Mean daily maximum °C (°F)	28 (82)	29 (84)	31 (88)	33 (91)	32 (90)	31 (88)	30 (86)	29 (84)	29 (84)	30 (86)	30 (86)	28 (82)	30 (86)
Mean daily minimum °C (°F)	20 (68)	20 (68)	21 (70)	22 (72)	24 (75)	24 (75)	24 (75)	24 (75)	24 (75)	23 (73)	22 (72)	21 (70)	22 (72)
Average precipitation mm (inches)	6 (0.2)	4 (0.2)	6 (0.2)	17 (0.7)	82 (3.2)	122 (4.8)	151 (5.9)	123 (4.8)	124 (4.9)	99 (3.9)	37 (1.5)	21 (0.8)	792 (31.1)
Average rainy days	3.3	2.5	11.7	6.6	17.7	22.2	25.2	23.7	23.2	17.9	9.2	5.2	168.4
Source: Meteoblue

== Demographics ==
Population census of Baliwag
Year	Pop.	±% p.a.
1903	15,936	—
1918	18,254	+0.91%
1939	22,972	+1.10%
1948	30,670	+3.26%
1960	37,409	+1.67%
1970	52,133	+3.37%
1975	61,624	+3.41%
1980	70,555	+2.74%
1990	89,719	+2.43%
1995	103,054	+2.63%
2000	119,675	+3.26%
2007	136,982	+1.88%
2010	143,565	+1.72%
2015	149,954	+0.83%
2020	168,470	+2.48%
2024	174,194	+0.81%
Source: Philippine Statistics Authority

In the 2020 census, the population of Baliwag, Bulacan, was 168,470 people, with a density of 3,700 inhabitants per square kilometer or 9,600 inhabitants per square mile.

=== Religion ===
Baliwag at present has six Roman Catholic parishes, a sub-parish and a quasi-parish under the administration of Diocese of Malolos. Their patron saint of Baliwag is St. Augustine because Baliwag was founded by the Augustinians in 1733. Other Christian denominations are also present in the city, including Iglesia ni Cristo, The Church of Jesus Christ of Latter-day Saints, Members Church of God International, Bible Baptist Church and Evangelical Christianity.

== Economy ==
Economy of Baliwag, Bulacan
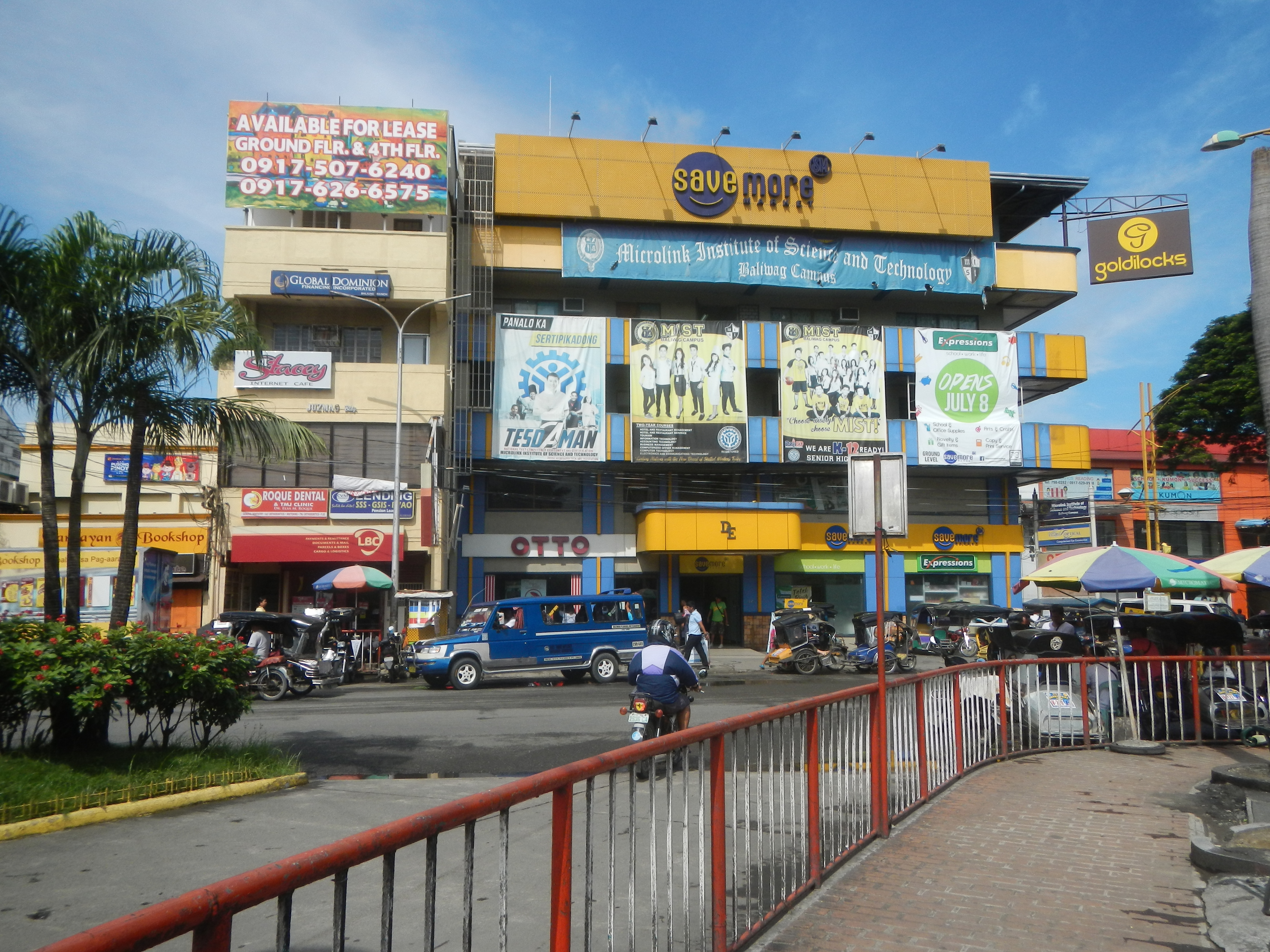
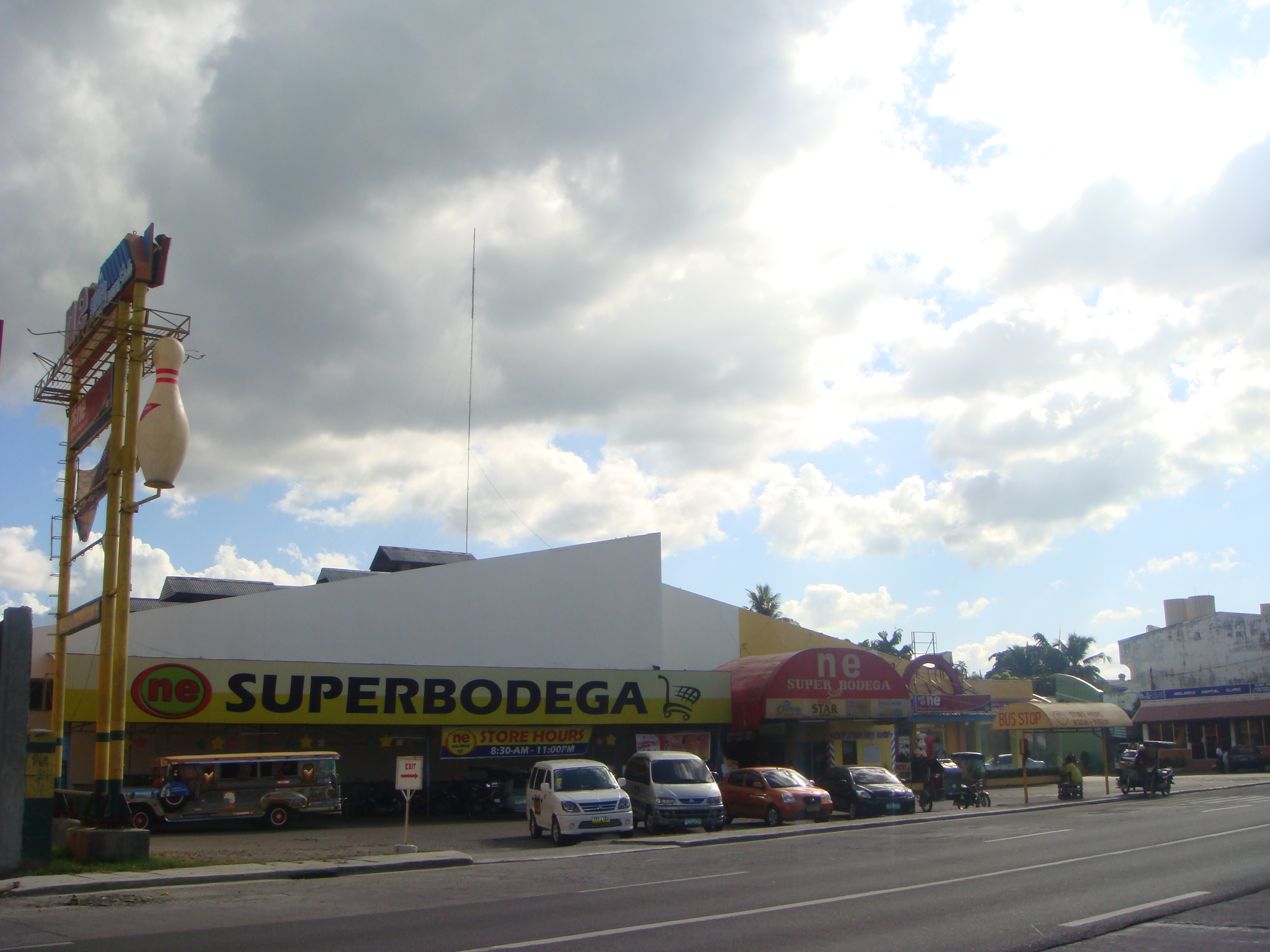
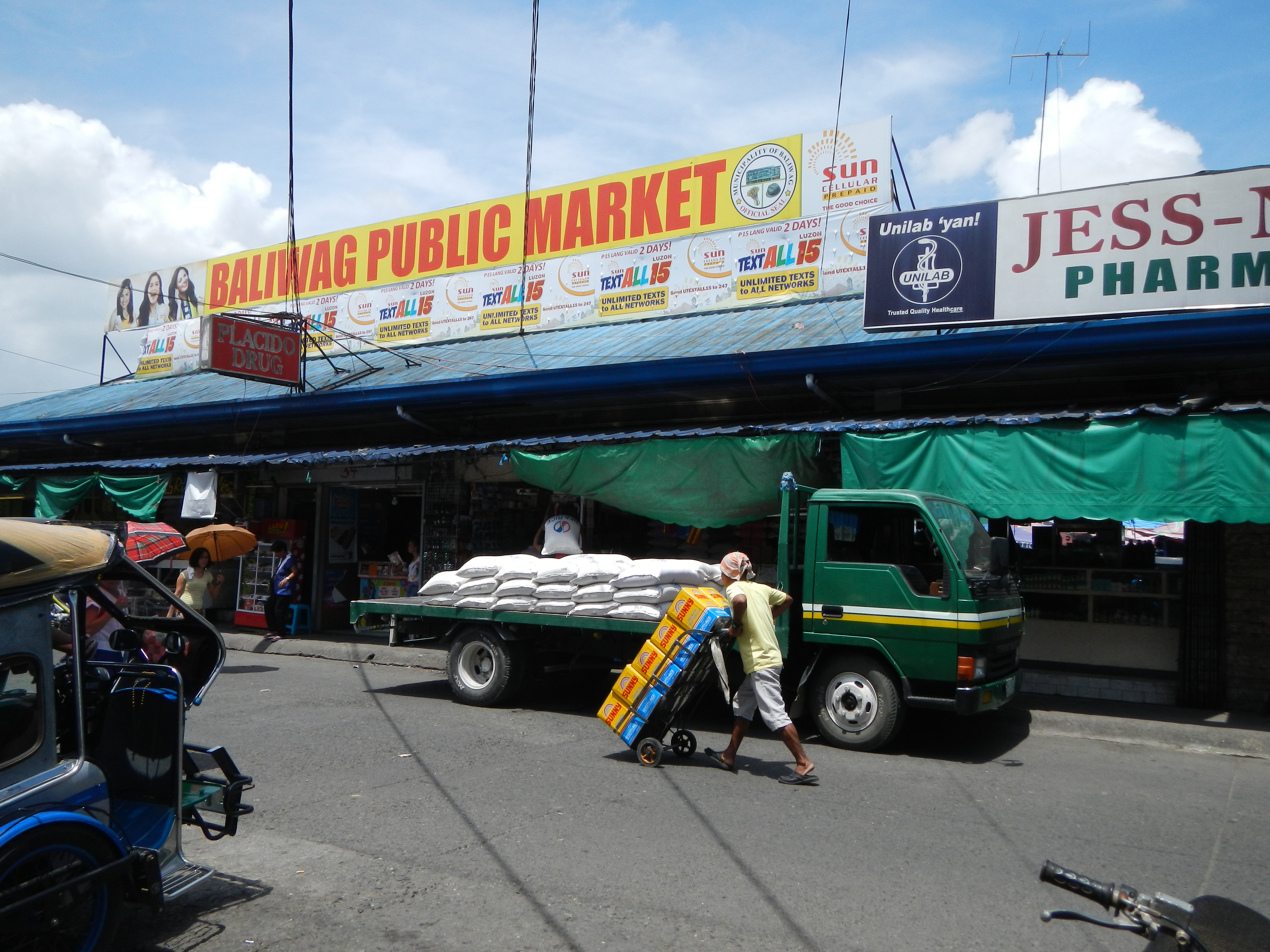
Baliwag Town Proper
2017 Financial Highlights
Financial Conditions
- Total Assets: ▲PHP 613.43 million
- Total Liabilities: ▲PHP 230.64 million
- Total Equity: ▲PHP 382.78 million
Results of Operations
- Total Revenues: ▲PHP 491.54 million
- Total Expenses: ▲PHP 459.84 million
- Excess Income Over Expenses: ▲PHP 31.70 million
Sources and Application of Funds
- Appropriation and Allotments: ▲PHP 507.30 million
- Obligations: ▲PHP 480.09 million
- Balances: ▲PHP 27.21 million

Poverty incidence of Baliwag (%)

Source: Philippine Statistics Authority

=== Major industries ===
- Garments
- Pyrotechnics
- Food/Food Processing
- Furniture
- Swine
- Chicken Production
- Automobile Industry

=== Major products ===
- Buntal Hat and Bags
- Bakeries (Native Pandesal, Ensaymada, Spanish Bread)
- Native Delicacies (Chicharon, Puto, Pastillas de Leche)
- Lechon Manok (famously Baliwag Lechon Manok)

== Government ==
=== Local government ===
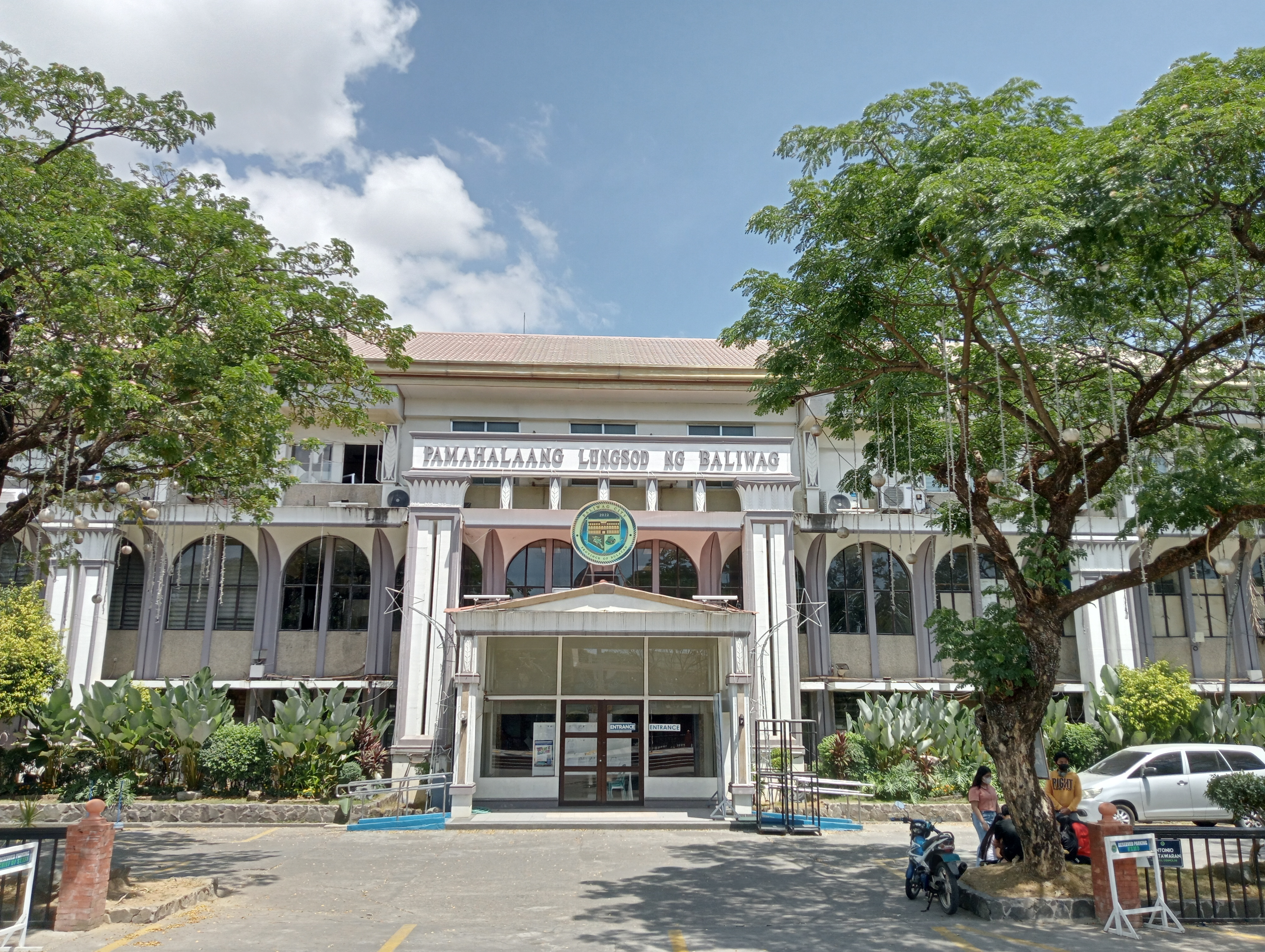
Baliwag City Hall

Baliwag City Officials (2025–28)
Position	Name	Party
Mayor	Sonia V. Estrella	NUP
Vice Mayor	Ferdinand "Ferdie" V. Estrella	NUP
Councilors	Jose Noel "Joel" S. Pascual	NUP
Councilors	Rodrigo "Ogie" E. Baltazar	NUP
Councilors	Dr. Katherine "Kitchie" A. Angelo-Dela Cruz	NUP
Councilors	Ron Harold "Ron Bata" P. Cruz	NUP
Councilors	Marie Nelle "Bhang" S. Imperial	NUP
Councilors	Karlo Kenneth "Kenneth" M. Cruz	NUP
Councilors	Lowell C. Tagle	NUP
Councilors	Antonio "Tony" S. Patawaran	NUP
Councilors	Dr. Carolina "Carol" L. Dellosa	PPM
Councilors	Andronicus "Consi Ron" O. Cruz	PPM
Ex Officio Municipal Council Members
ABC President	Michael R. Lopez (Santo Cristo)	Nonpartisan
SK Federation President	Jerome D.P. Gonzales (Concepcion)	Nonpartisan

=== List of former mayors ===
No.	Presidente Municipal	Took office	Left office
1	Francisco Guerrero	1899	1899
2	Jose Rustia	1900	1900
3	Aniceto Valencia	1901	1903
4	Dr. Domingo M. Enrile	1904	1905
5	Jose Lajom	1906	1907
6	Fernando Enrile	1908	1909
7	Martin H. Prado	1910	1912
8	Juan Racelis	1913	1918
9	Pablo Camacho	1919	1922
10	Emilio Rustia	1922	1925
11	Pedro R. Mateo	1925	1930
12	Dr. Peregrino E. Sauco	1931	1934
13	Atty. Wenceslao Ortega	1934	1937
No.	Alcalde	Took office	Left office
1	Dr. Guilermo dela Merced	1938	1941
2	Rafael Chico	1942	1945
No.	Municipal Mayors	Took office	Left office
1	Maj. Servando C. Santos	1946	1955
2	Roberto E. Chico	1956	1959
3	Felix R. Tiongson	1960	1963
4	Roberto E. Chico	1964	1967
5	Florentino Vergel de Dios	1968	March 1980
6	Dominador Enrile	March 1980	September 20, 1981
7	Leonardo C. Mananghaya	September 20, 1981	May 1986
8	Atty. Emilio Camacho Santos (OIC)	May 1986	January 7, 1988
9	Reynaldo S. del Rosario	February 2, 1988	June 30, 1992
10	Cornelio P. Trinidad	June 30, 1992	November 16, 1994
11	Edilberto S. Tengco	November 16, 1994	June 30, 1998
12	Rolando F. Salvador	June 30, 1998	June 30, 2004
13	Romeo M. Estrella	June 30, 2004	June 30, 2013
14	Dr. Carolina L. Dellosa	June 30, 2013	June 30, 2016
15	Ferdinand V. Estrella	June 30, 2016	December 17, 2022
No.	City Mayors	Took office	Left office
1	Ferdinand V. Estrella	December 17, 2022	June 30, 2025
2	Sonia V. Estrella	June 30, 2025	present

=== City seal ===
According to Republic Act No. 11929, the official seal of the city shall be circular in form with the dominant colors of green and blue representing the city's vision to promote economic and social progress, sustainable development, and technological advancement. The year 2022 at the center upper part of the official seal indicates the year that Baliwag became a component city. The building structure represents the facade of the town’s seat of government. On top of this image is the year 1733, when Baliwag was founded by the Augustinians. The official seal shall display rice stalks to indicate that the City of Baliwag maintains its commitment to national food security as one of the top rice yielders in the Province of Bulacan. The Baliwag buntal hat, a product woven in this City and is regarded as superior in quality to other types of buntal hats produced in the country, is likewise depicted in the official seal. The City of Baliwag may alter its official seal, provided that any change of the seal shall be approved by Congress and registered with the Department of the Interior and Local Government (DILG).

== Tourism ==
The city's main Roman Catholic church, the Saint Augustine Parish Church was built during the Spanish era and was declared an important cultural property by the National Commission for Culture and the Arts in 2026. The city also contains a museum dedicated to the life of Mariano Ponce.

== Transportation ==
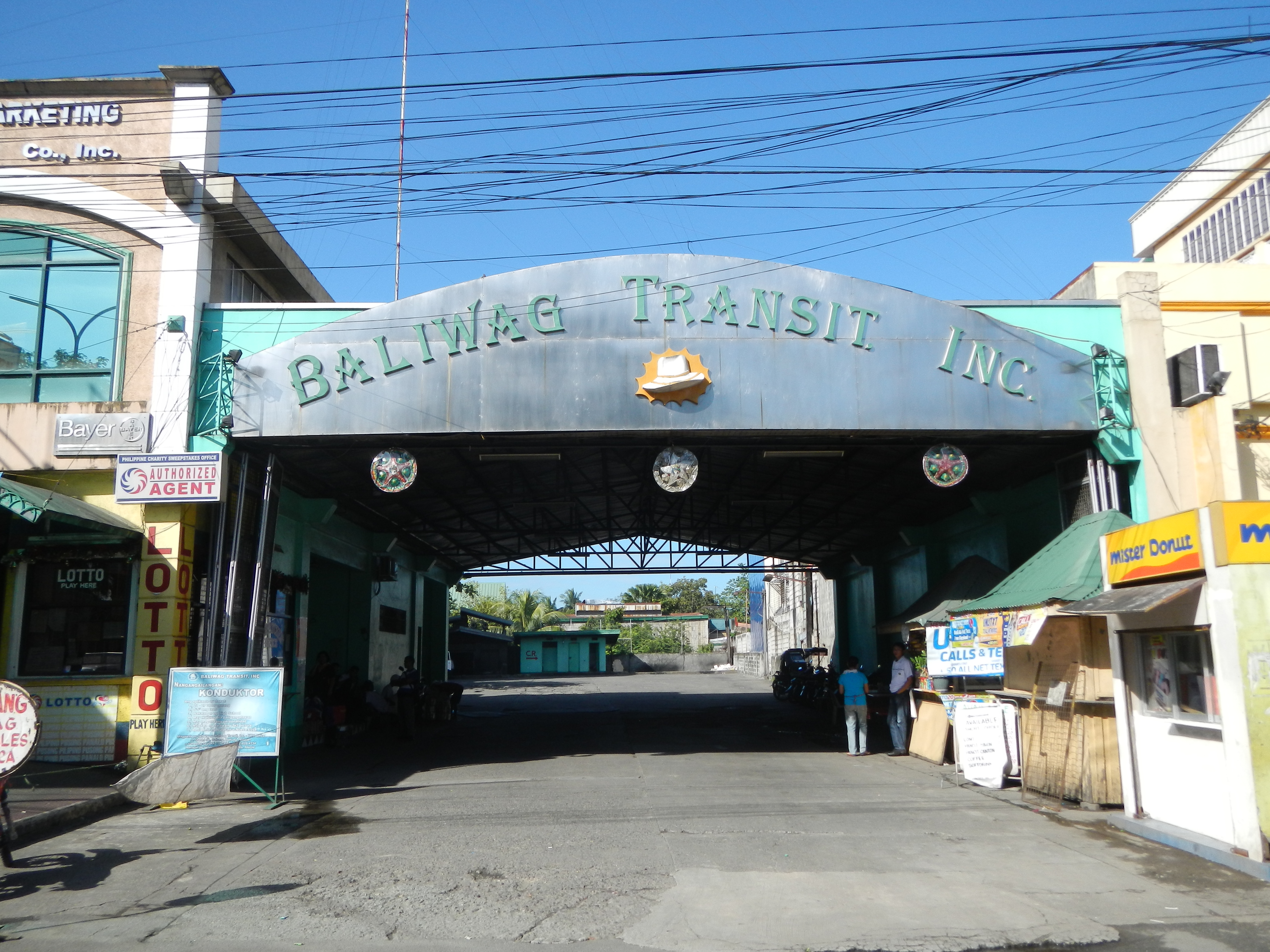
BTI main terminal in Plaza Naning, Baliwag

Public transportation in Baliwag is served by provincial buses, jeepneys, UV Express AUVs, and intra-municipal tricycles.

Baliwag Transit, Inc., one of the largest bus transportation system in the Philippines, is headquartered in Barangay Tibag. It mainly services routes to and from Metro Manila and Central Luzon.

There are three major transport lines in the municipality: The Baliwag - Candaba (Benigno S. Aquino Avenue) road going to Pampanga (from the Downtown Baliwag to Candaba Town Proper), the Old Cagayan Valley road (Calle Rizal) and the Dona Remedios Trinidad Highway (N1, AH26) going to Manila and Nueva Ecija. The city is located 52 kilometers north of Manila, the capital of the Philippines.

== Education ==
The Baliwag Schools Division Office governs all educational institutions within the municipality. It oversees the management and operations of all private and public, from primary to secondary schools.

=== Primary and elementary schools ===
- Baliuag Alliance Christian Academy
- Tilapayong Elementary School
- San Jose Elementary School
- Concepcion Elementary School
- Sabang Elementary School
- Baliwag North Central School
- Baliwag South Central School
- Jacinto Ponce Elementary School
- Catulinan Elementary School
- Pinagbarilan Elementary School
- Hinukay Elementary School
- Engr. Vicente R. Cruz Memorial School
- Makinabang Elementary School
- Tarcan Elementary School
- Sta. Barbara Elementary School
- Tiaong Elementary School
- Immaculate Concepcion School of Baliwag
- Living Angels Christian Academy
- Montessori De Sagrada Familia
- St. Mary's College of Baliwag

=== Secondary schools ===
- Mariano Ponce National High School
- Sto. Niño High School
- Virgen Delas Flores High School
- Sulivan National High School
- Teodoro Evangelista Memorial High School
- Sta. Barbara High School
- Saint Jean Baptiste Academy, Inc.
- San Benildo Integrated School
- St. Joseph School of Baliwag
- The Catholic Servants of Christ Community

=== Higher educational institutions ===
- ACLC
- Baliuag University
- Baliuag Polytechnic College
- Bulacan College of Computer Science
- Fernandez College of Arts and Technology
- Marian College of Baliwag
- National University (Baliwag Campus) — SM City Baliwag
- Our Lady of Mt. Carmel College
- St. Mary's College of Baliuag
- STI College
- St. Mark College

== Notable people ==
- Clem Castro - musician and singer-songwriter
- Mcoy Fundales - musician, writer, and actor
- Empoy Marquez - actor, comedian, and host
- Cris Villanueva - actor

== Gallery ==
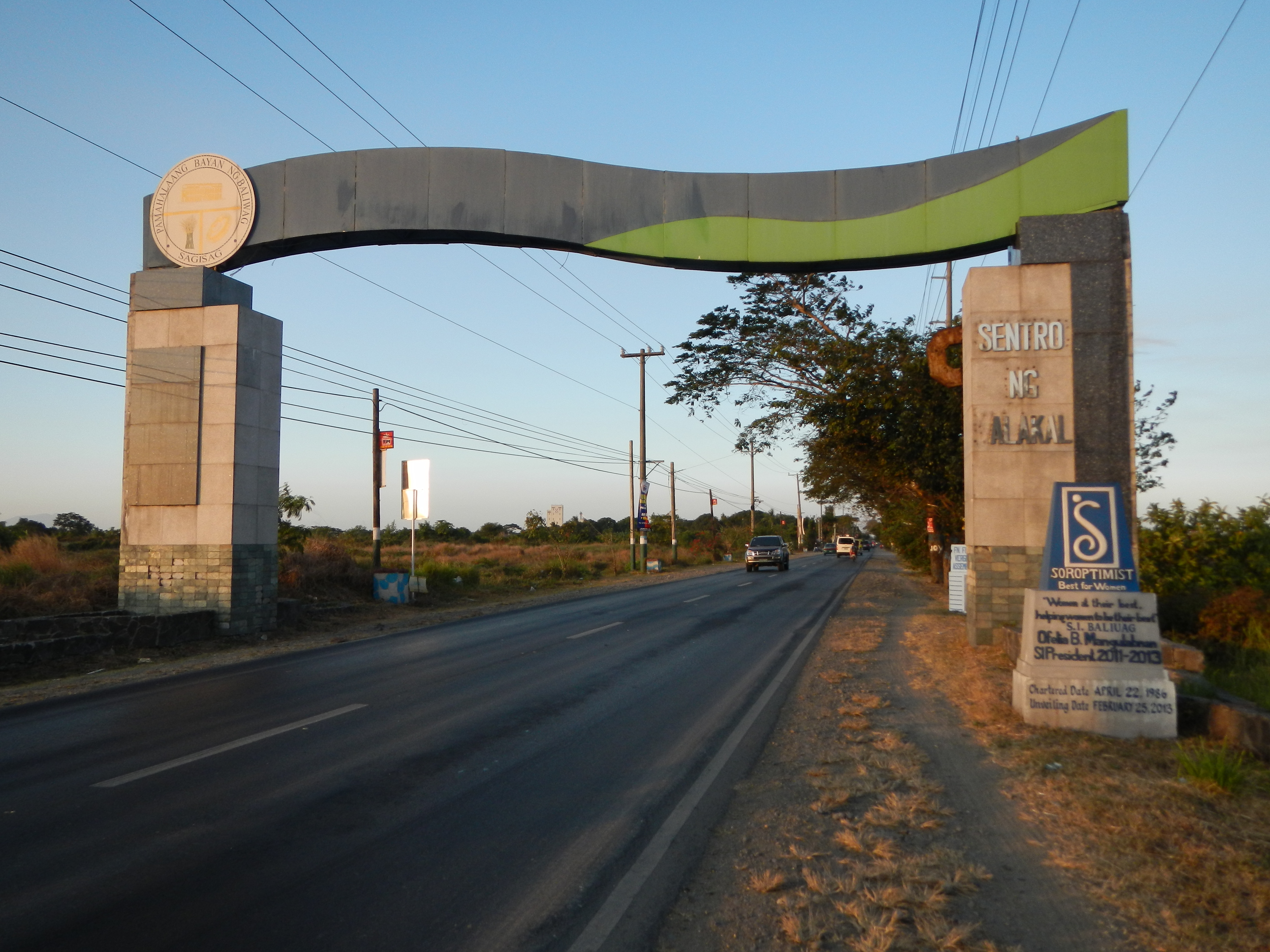
Baliwag Welcome Arch from Pulilan, Bulacan

Baliwag Clock tower

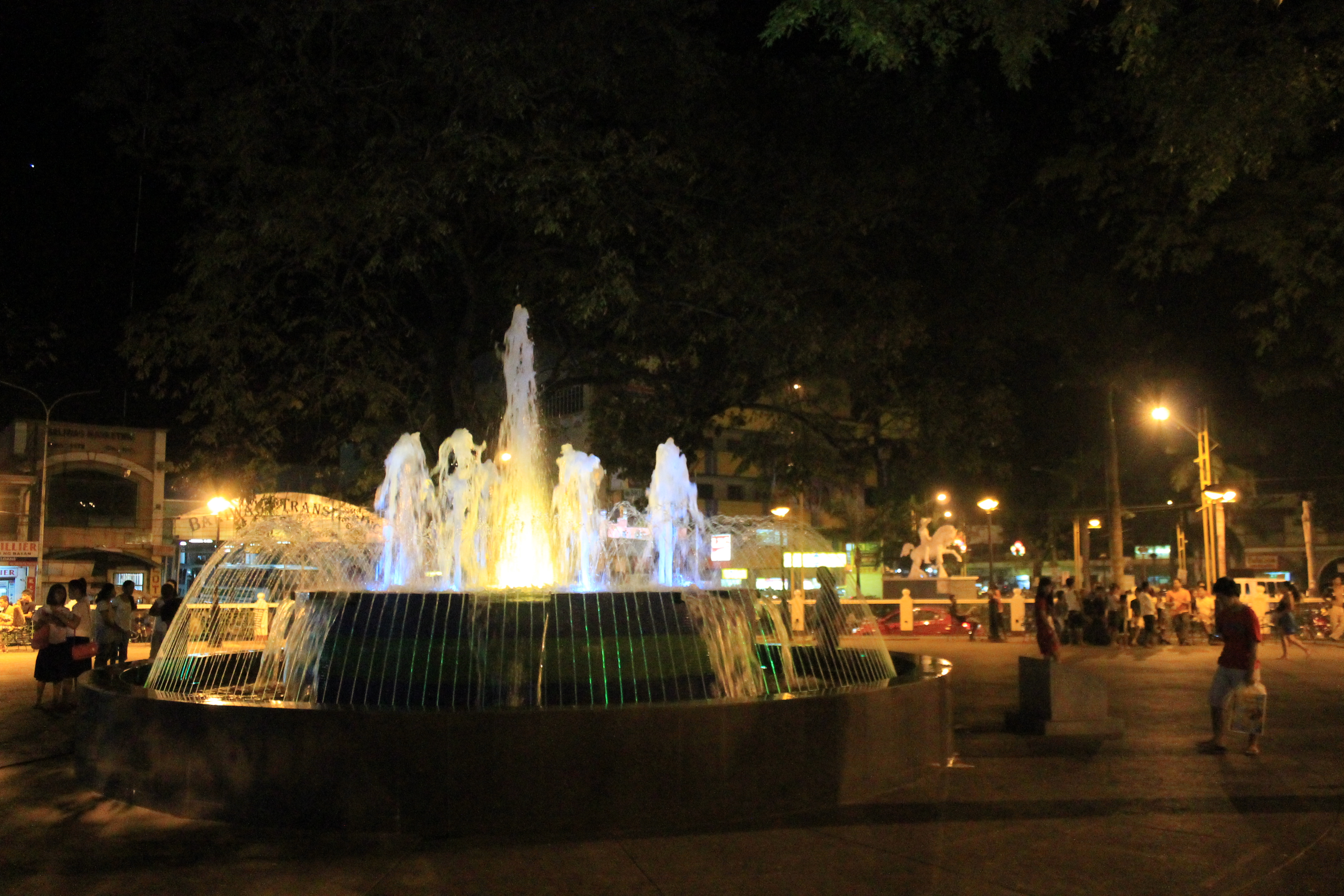
Baliwag Glorietta Park at night

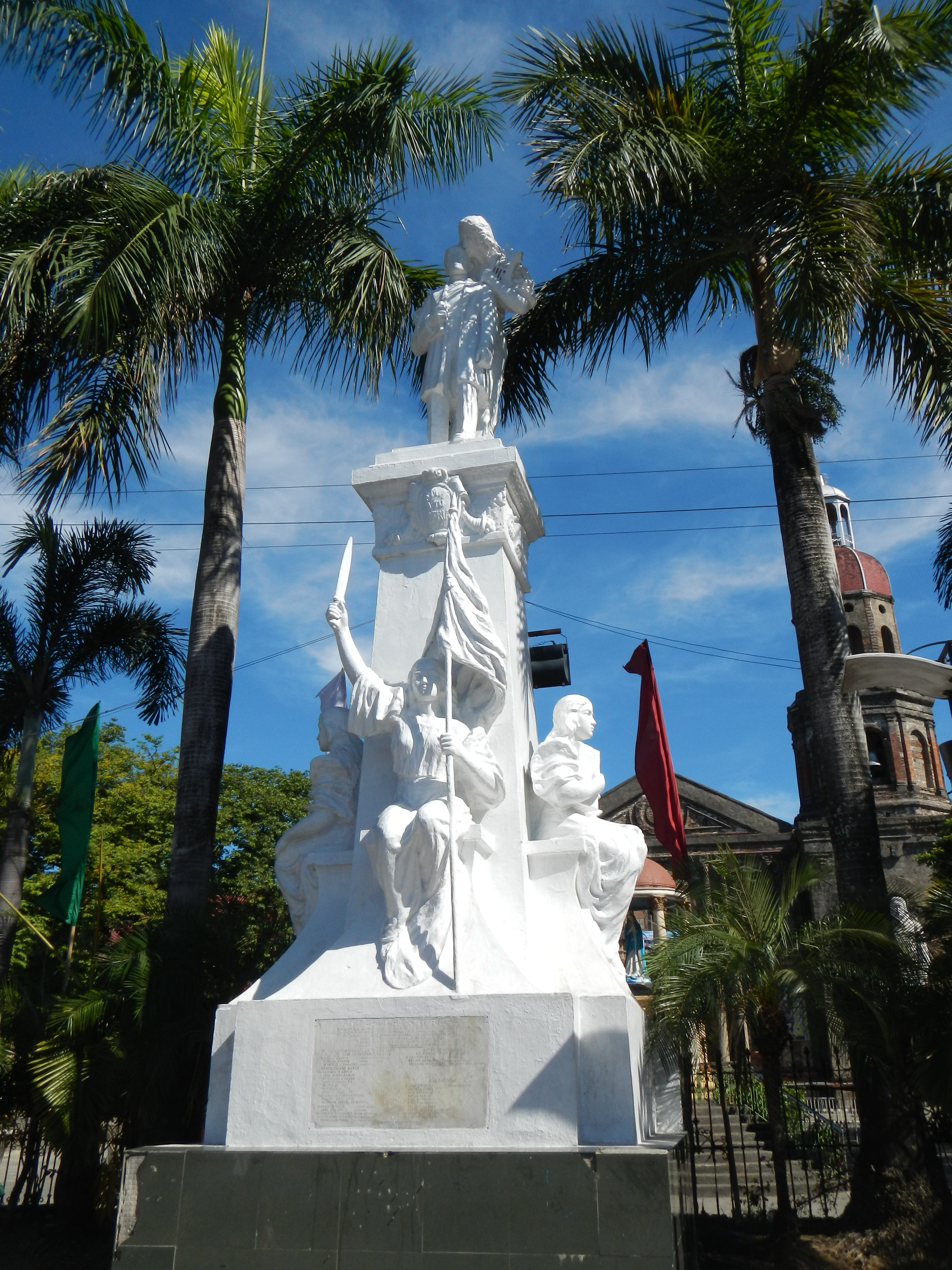
Ang Baliwag kay Rizal Monument

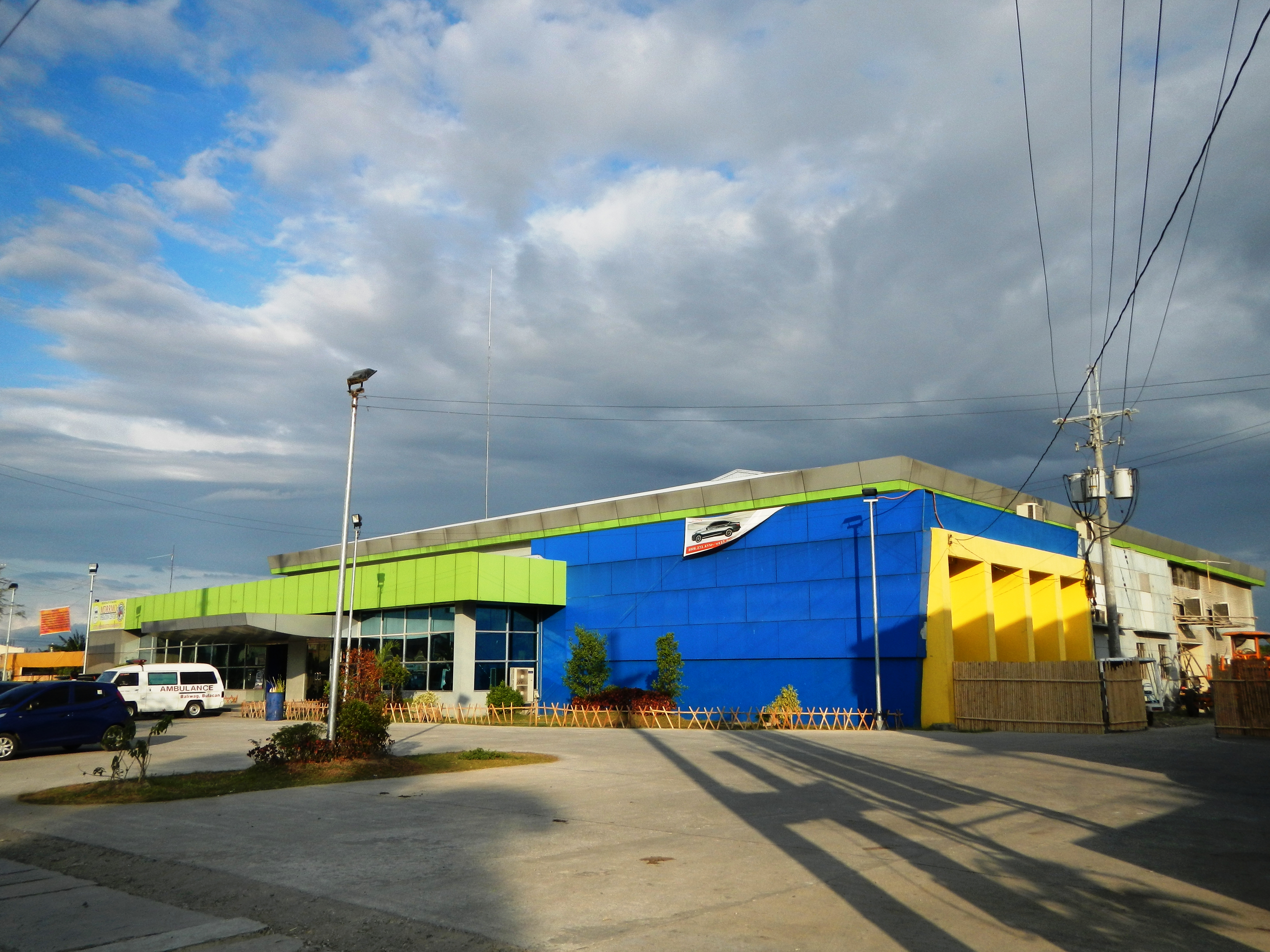
Baliwag Star Arena

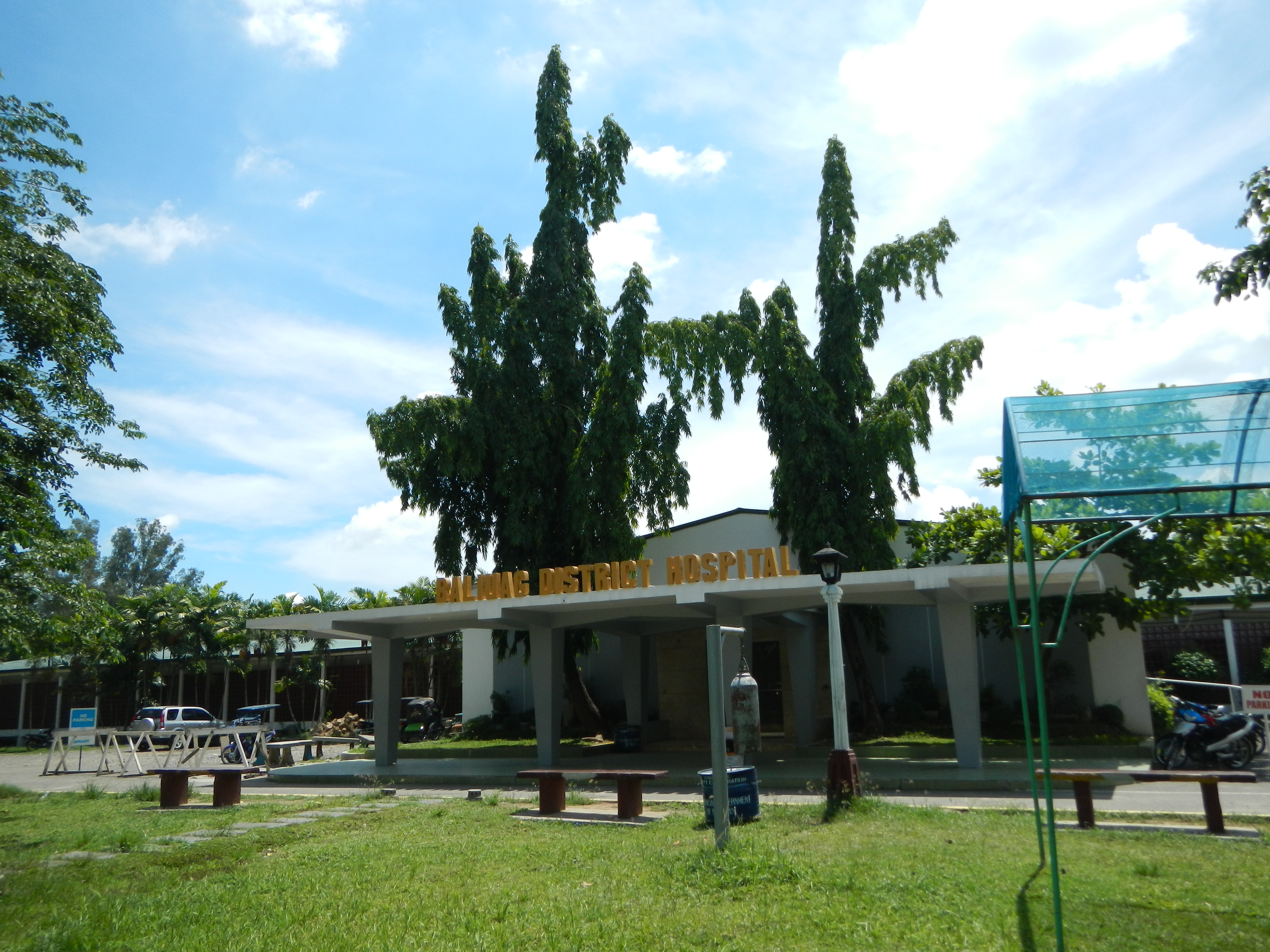
Baliwag District Hospital

== See also ==
- Good Friday processions in Baliwag
- Saint Augustine Parish Church (Baliwag)
- Baliuag Museum and Library
- Sub-Parish Church of Santo Cristo
- Lady of Most Holy Rosary Parish Church
- Fernandez College of Arts and Technology
- Baliuag University
- St. Mary's College of Baliuag
- Baliwag Transit
- SM City Baliwag
- Dr. Joaquin Gonzalez
