= Saint Augustine Parish Church (Baliwag) =

Roman Catholic church in Bulacan, Philippines

Baliwag Church
- Diocesan Shrine and Parish of Saint Augustine
- Iglesia Parroquial de San Agustín de Baliuag
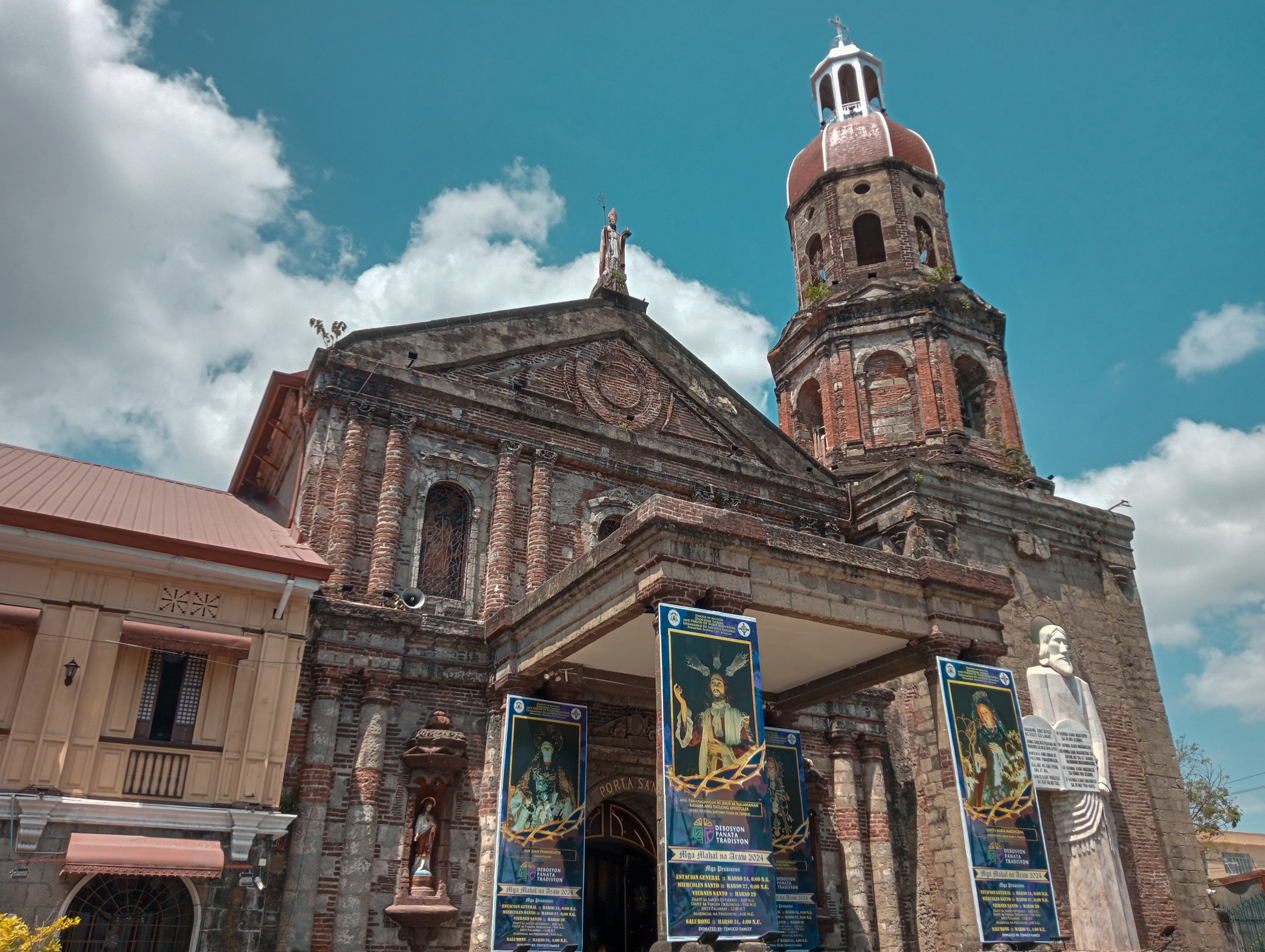
- Church facade in 2024

- Location in Bulacan Location in Luzon Location in the Philippines
- 14°57′18″N 120°54′2″E
- Location: Baliwag, Bulacan
- Country: Philippines
- Denomination: Roman Catholic

History
- Status: Parish church
- Founded: May 26, 1733
- Founder: Augustinian Friars
- Dedicated: April 24, 2017
- Consecrated: April 24, 2017
- Events: Elevation as Diocesan Shrine-February 13, 2024

Architecture
- Functional status: Active
- Heritage designation: Declared by National Historical Commission as a Historical Church
- Designated: August 28, 2023
- Architectural type: Church building
- Style: Baroque
- Groundbreaking: 1790
- Completed: 1801 or 1830

Specifications
- Materials: adobe stones, bricks, gravel, sand and steel

Administration
- District: Northern District
- Province: Bulacan
- Archdiocese: Manila
- Diocese: Malolos

Clergy
- Bishop(s): Most. Rev. Dennis C. Villarojo, D.D.
- Priest: Narciso S. Sampana

The Diocesan Shrine and Parish of Saint Augustine, commonly known as Baliwag Church, is a Roman Catholic church located in Plaza Naning at the poblacion (town center) of Baliwag, in Bulacan province, Philippines. The church is a parish church of the Diocese of Malolos, which is a suffragan of the Archdiocese of Manila.

The parish was established by the Augustinians in 1733 under the patronage of Augustine of Hippo. The town's feast or commonly known as Pistang Bayan is celebrated every second Sunday of May while the Patron's Feast (Pistang Patron) is celebrated every August 28. During the church's Great Jubilee celebration in the year 2000, the Diocese of Malolos designated the Baliwag Church as one of the 11 pilgrimage churches in the province of Bulacan. in 2015, the Diocese of Malolos designated again the Baliwag Church as one of the Jubilee of Mercy churches in the province of Bulacan for the Extraordinary Jubilee Year of Mercy by Pope Francis which ends on November 20, 2016. In 2021, this church was also designated by the Bishop of Malolos to be one of the Jubilee Churches for the celebration of the 500 Years of Christianity in the Philippines.

The Good Friday procession of the church is one of the largest in the country with more than 100 religious floats of sceneries showing the stories from the book of the evangelists from the new Testament and Lenten scenes paraded.

== History ==
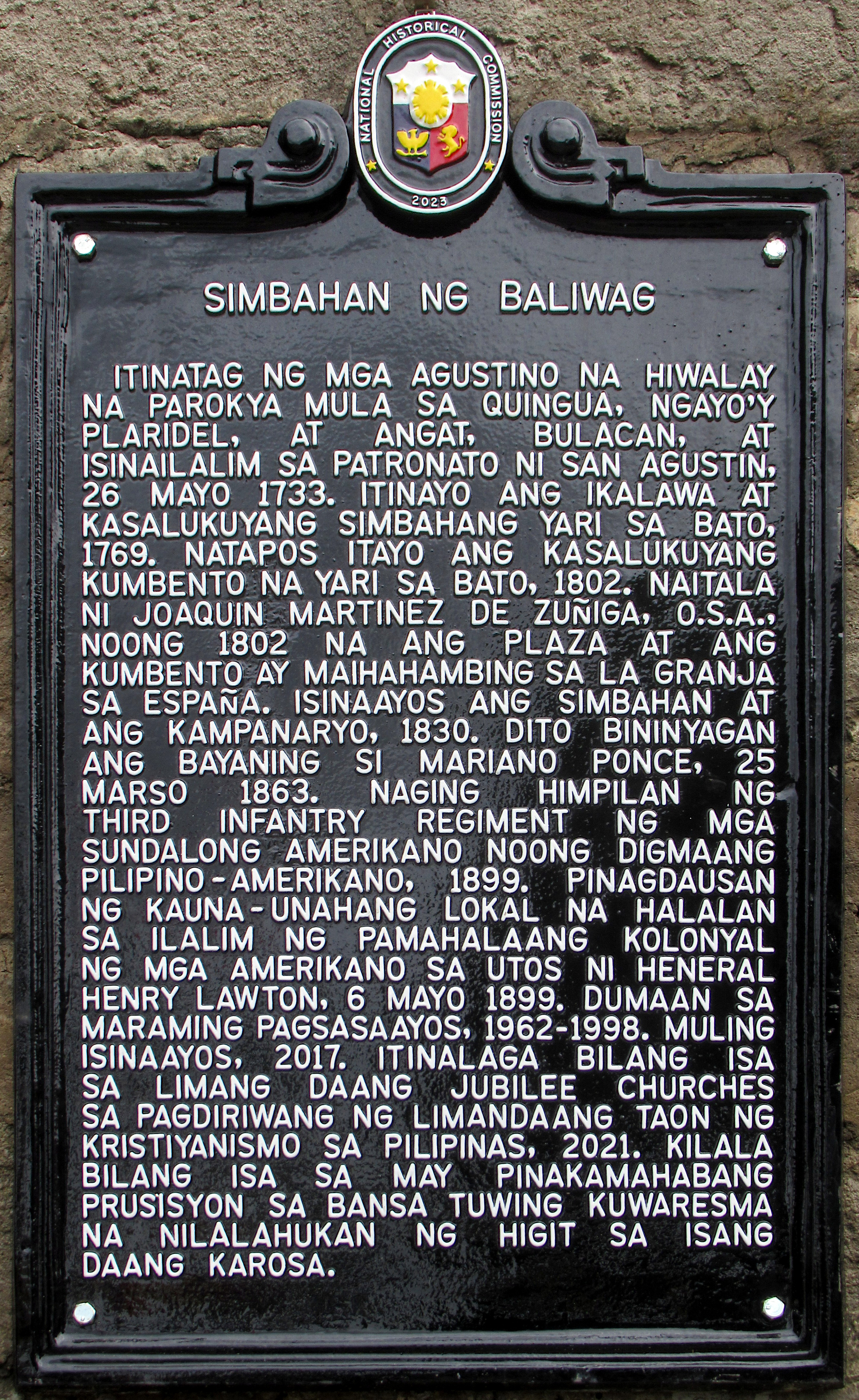
Church NHC historical marker installed in 2023

Spanish records ("Apuntes históricos de la provincia augustiniana del Santísimo Nombre de Jesús de Filipinas", año 1909: Filipinas, by P. Bernardo Martinez) reveal that Juan de Albarran was the assigned parish priest of Baliwag in 1733. The parish of Baliwag was founded and began its official existence on May 26, 1733. The first church and convent was first established at Barangay Sta. Barbara, Baliwag. The first baptism in Baliwag Church was ordered by Lector and Feliz Trillo, Provincial of the Province on June 7, 1733. The town or pueblo was created in the provincial Chapter of May 15, 1734, and the appointment of Manuel Bazeta (or Baseta) as first parish priest.

Between 1769 and 1774, the second church of Baliwag was built by Gregorio Giner. Esteban Diez Hidalgo came to Baliwag in 1789, and served as the longest parish priest of Baliwag. Under his curacy, the church and convent was moved to its present location in 1790, after which construction began. The church of mortar and stone was completed in 1801 or 1830.

Historian Joaquín Martínez de Zúñiga arrived in the Philippines on August 3, 1786, and visited Baliwag on February 17, 1802, with Spanish Naval officer Ignacio Maria de Álava hosted by Esteban Diez.

Joaquín Martínez de Zúñiga in his 1803 Historia de las Islas Filipinas, wrote that the convent or parochial house of San Agustin in Baliwag is the best in the whole archipelago, and that no edifice in Manila can be compared to it in symmetry and beauty amid its towering belfry, which has a panoramic view of the town. The monk further stated that the convent was a repository of priceless parish records which dated to the founding of Baliwag.

The earthquake of June 3, 1863, one of the strongest ever to hit Manila and its environs, damaged the Baliwag Church and toppled the previous church. In 1870, the reconstruction began after a temporary house of worship was established, the "Provincial" on Año 1733 street. It was later used by the RVM Sisters of the Colegio de la Sagrada Familia (now St. Mary's College of Baliuag) as a classroom. Antonio de Mesa, "Maestrong Tonio" fabricated the parts to have finished the Baliwag Church.

During the July 19, 1880 earthquake, the church received considerable damage. The belfry that was completed in 1866 by Matias Novoa was also damaged by the same quake. It was later repaired by Thomas Gresa. During the Spanish colonial era, Baliwag had 30 curates between 1733 and 1898.

=== American colonial period ===
The Philippine-American civil and military authorities chose Baliwag as the site of the first Philippine elections of May 7, 1899. The Filipinos gathered at the plaza of the St. Augustine church after the Mass, and thereafter the officials were selected based on the qualifications for voters set by the Americans.

=== Restoration ===
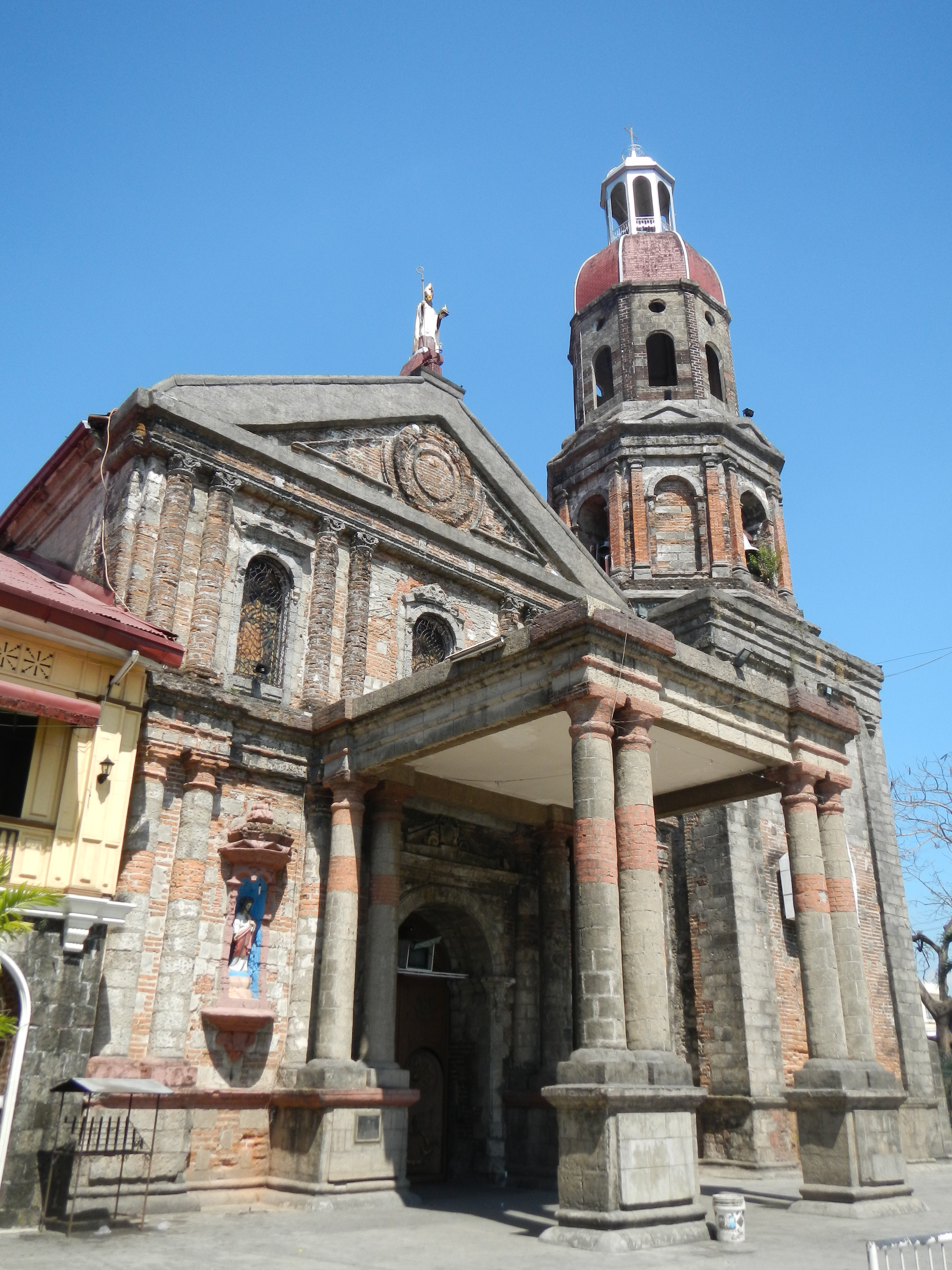
The church portico added during the curacy of Fr. Amado Paulino

The Baliwag Church underwent several rehabilitation. The first was during the term of Amado Paulino. His engineer, Bert Iral did the face lift, restored the rectory and the main building including the addition of the marble slabs for the departed. He also built the tall portico that is supported by two sturdy columns at the main door entrance. A small cupola was placed on top of the belfry for four giant trumpet loudspeakers.

For the 1972 town fiesta, the "Silungan" (canopy) was restored. In 1979, the towering marble relief of Moses holding The Ten Commandments was added to the church. It was unveiled and blessed on March 7, 1983, as a gift of the Town Fiesta Executive Committee under Bishop Leopoldo Arcaira, the Auxiliary Bishop of Malolos at that time in Baliwag.

The convent refectory including the facade were restored in 1993 to its old Spanish colonial look in time for the town fiesta. The St. Francis of Assisi statue and the St. Augustine Multi-Purpose Parish Hall were added.

The Balibuntal Club '94 and Parish Pastoral Council (Sangguniang Pastoral) helped built the "Galeria San Agustin", the church museum, so that visitors can appreciate the church's treasuries and history. It was finished on May 28, 1994, by Rodrigo S. Ligon and Menchie P. Martinez. The Knights of Columbus, Mother Butler's Guild (Mother Marie Joseph Butler), the Adoration Chapel, and many other parish offices were later added to serve the religious needs of the parishioners.

Recent restoration and additions to the Baliwag Church

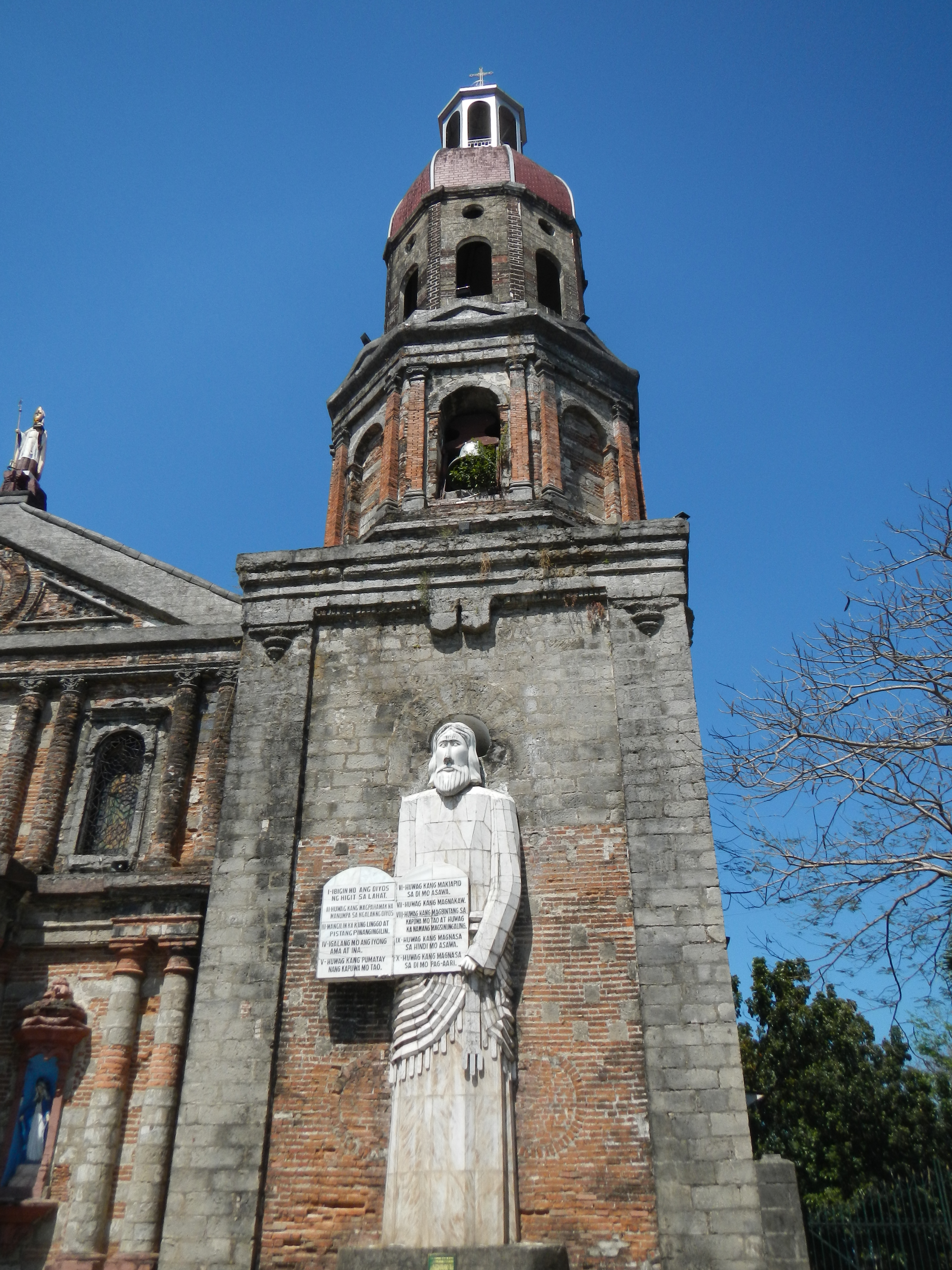
Bell tower with the relief of Moses and the Ten Commandments added in 1979

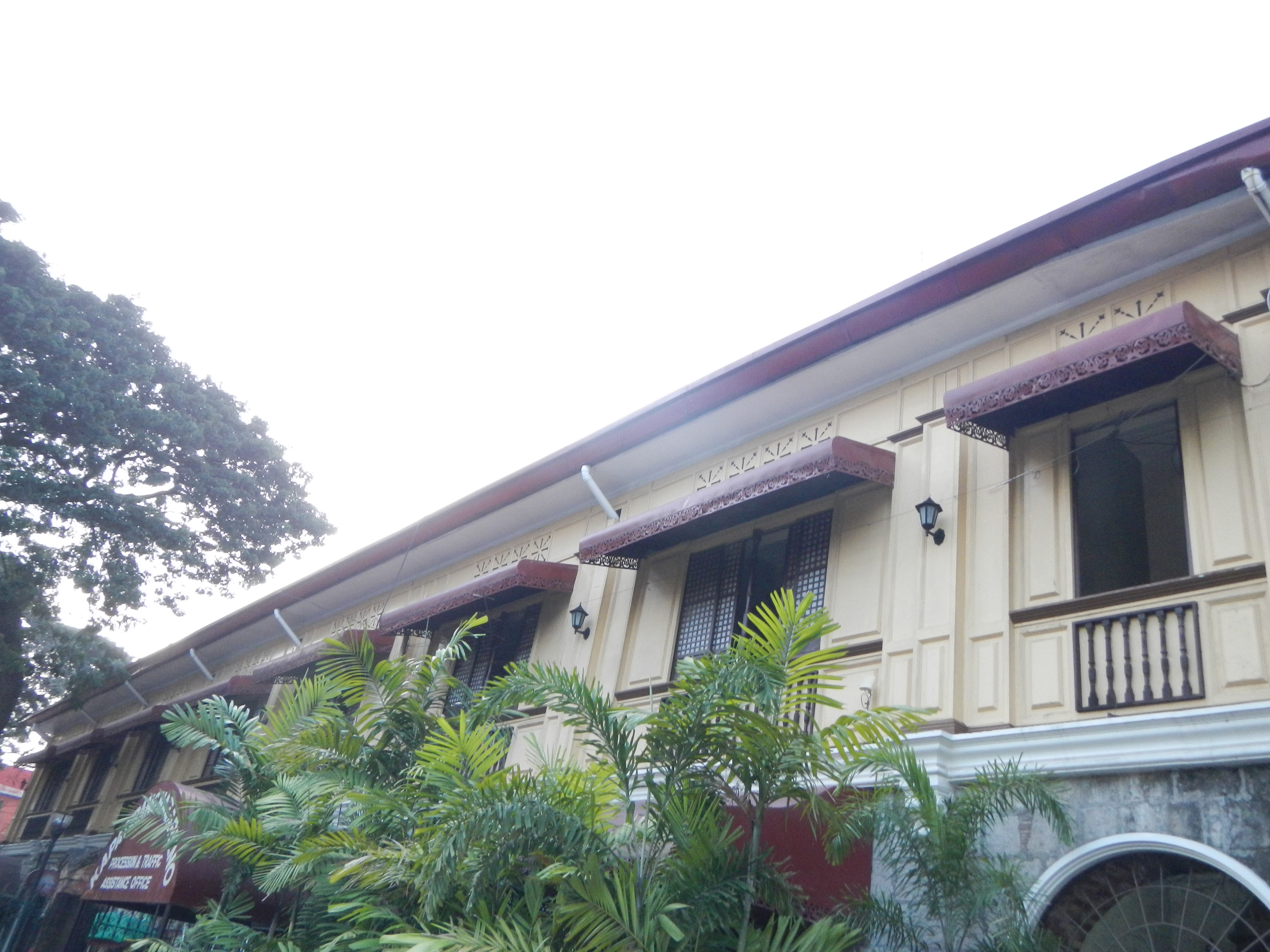
Parish convent and refectory after the 1993 restoration

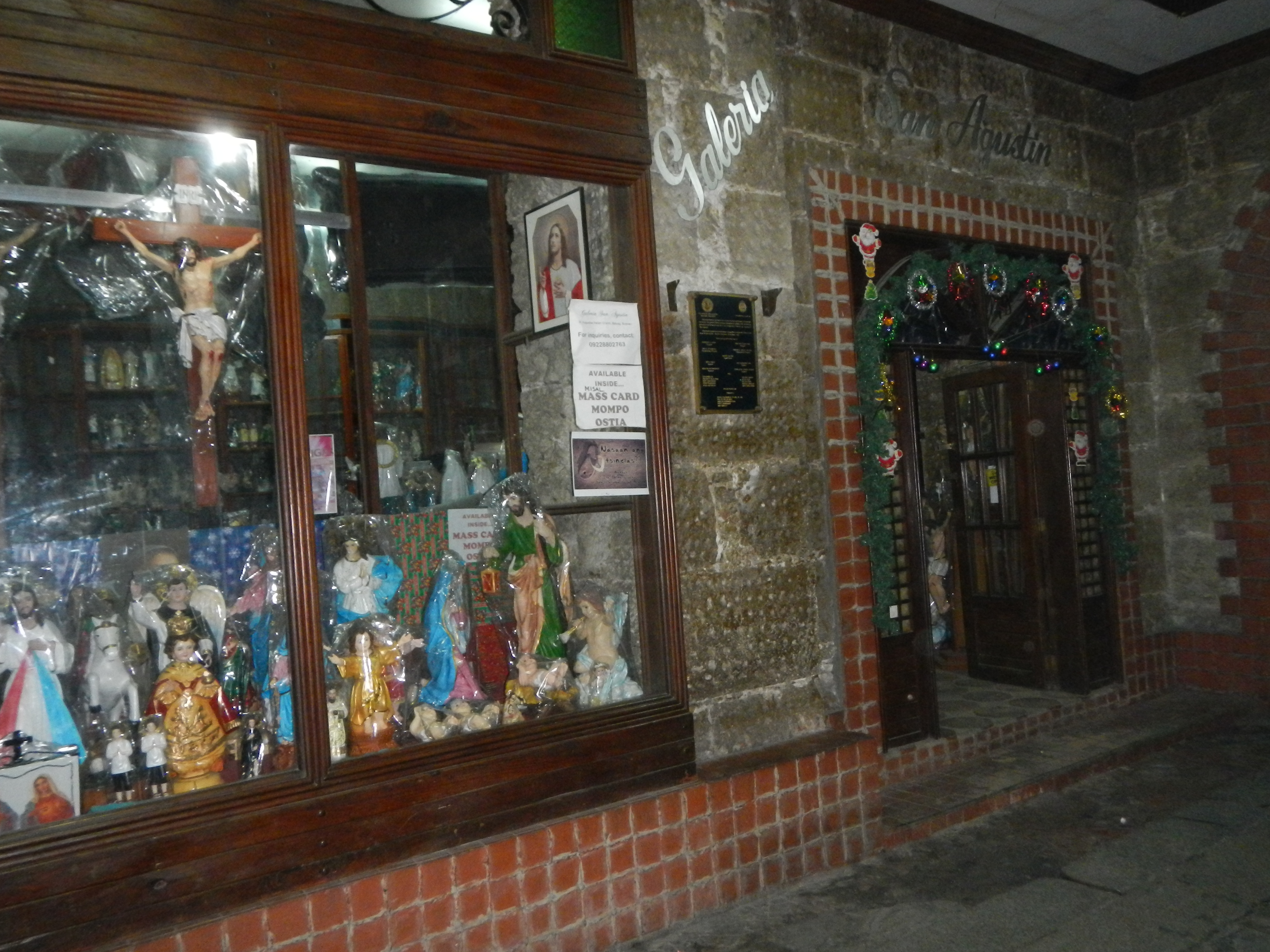
Galeria San Agustin, the church souvenir shop completed in 1994

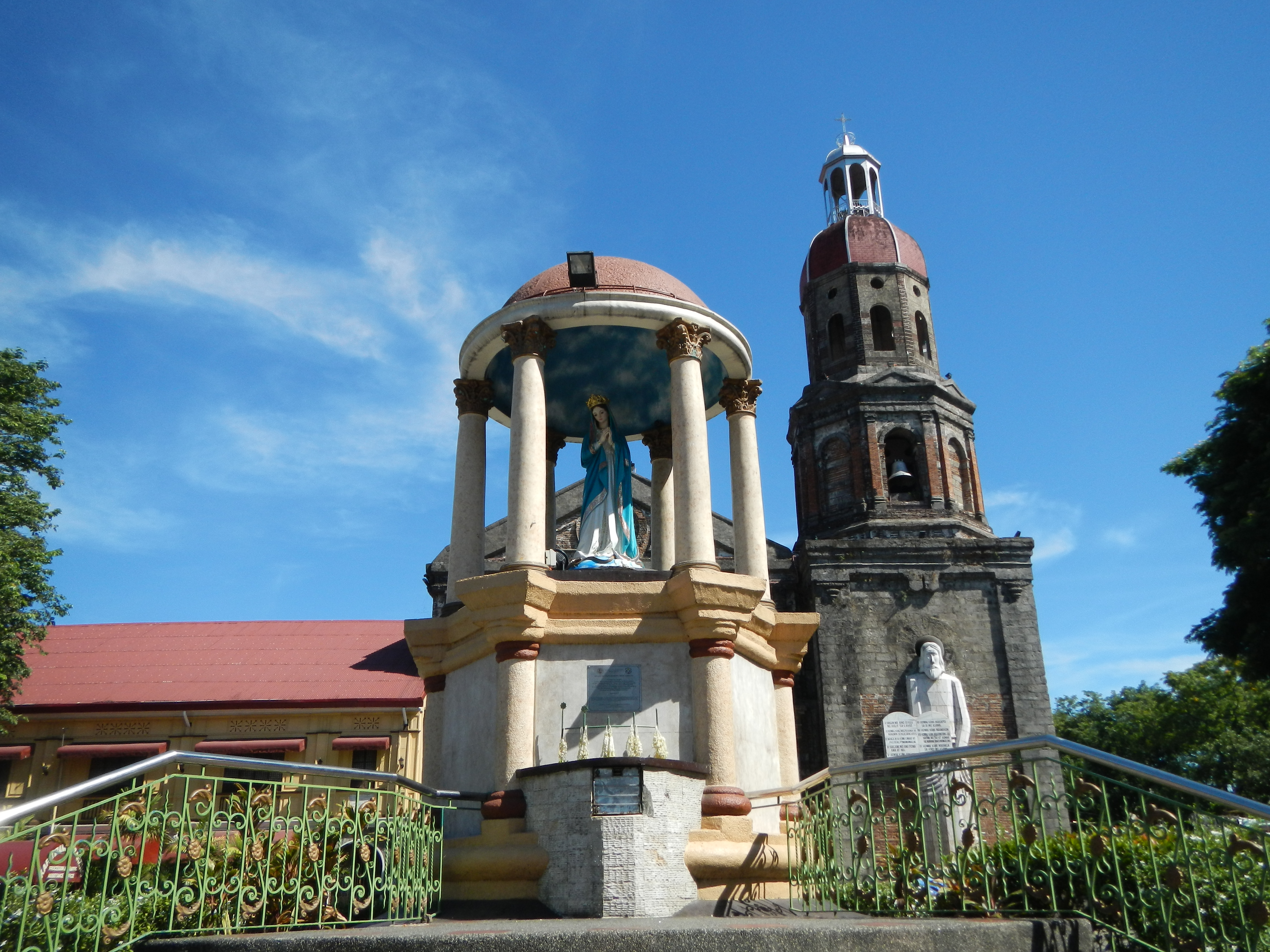
Altar of the Immaculate Concepcion at the church patio built in 2003

Msgr. Feliciano M. Palma Jr., the parish priest of San Agustin Church from 1987 to 2001, did the major rebuilding of the church from 1996 to 1998 after it had been invaded by termites since 1990. Palma mobilized Lito Tengco's SACOY to fund the restoration under Administrator Joel Pascual. The August 27, 1996, Telethon-Concert dubbed as "Ang Lahat ng ito'y para sa'yo Panginoon" resulted the inflow of PHP 2 million donations. The second concert on August 8, 1997, "Sa iyo lamang, Panginoon, Salamat" raised PHP 1 million resulting in the solemn inauguration of the church on August 28, 1998, amid the full restoration amount of PHP 7,106,399 spent. Tats Villanueva added ceiling and dome paintings.

The altar of the Immaculate Concepcion at the church patio was erected on May 7, 2003, by the St. Augustine Charity Clinic. Last February 1, 2021, the venerated image of La Purisima Concepcion de Baliwag (Ang Birhen sa Patio) was episcopally crowned by Bishop Dennis Villarojo.

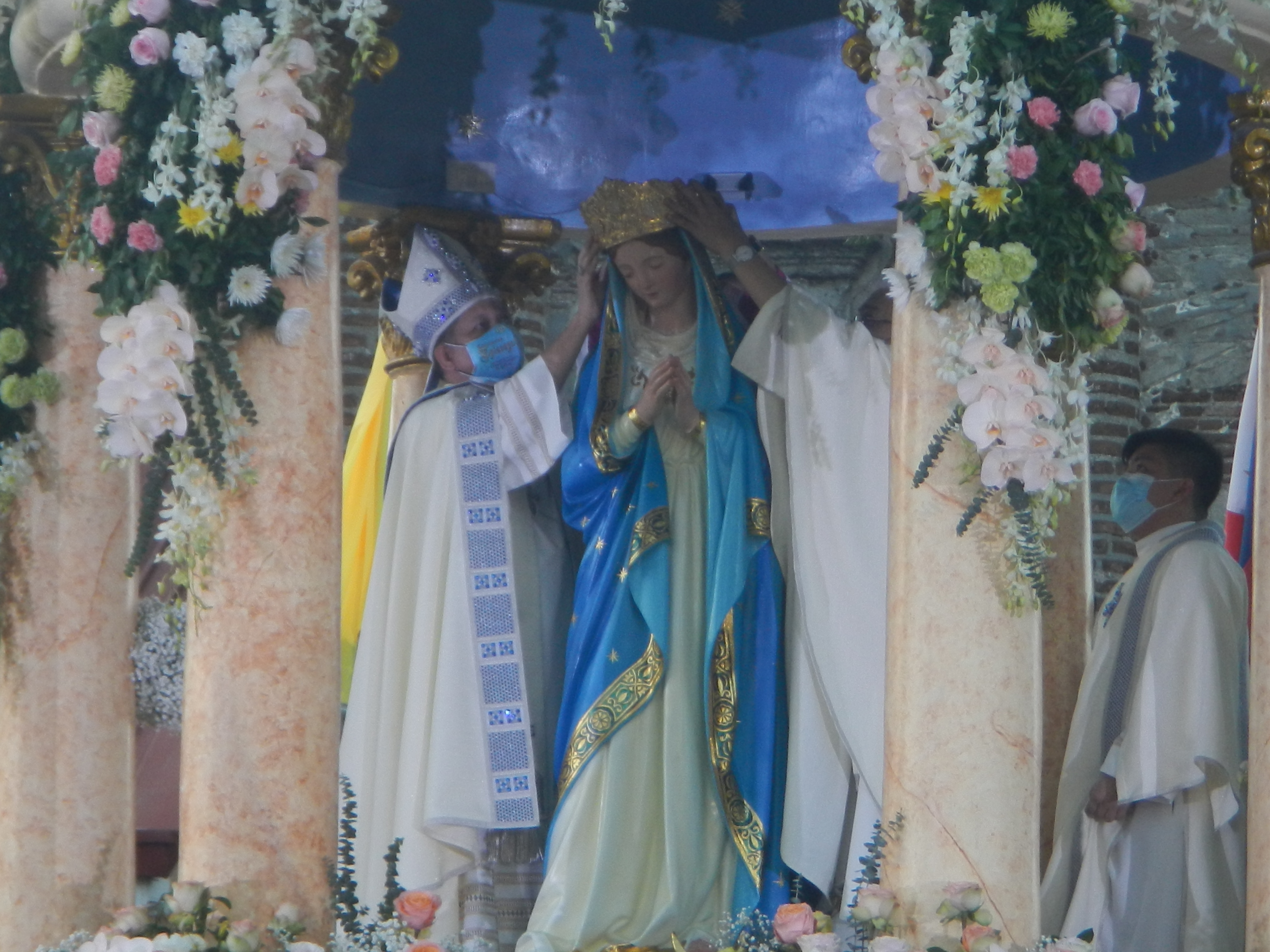
The episcopal coronation of the Virgin of Purísima Concepción in 2021

And in April 24, 2017, Commemoration of the Conversion of Saint Augustine, under the incumbency of then parish priest, Msgr. Andres S. Valera, the newly restored church was dedicated and consecrated in a mass presided by Orlando Beltran Cardinal Quevedo, Archbishop of Cotabato and Cardinal Priest of Santa Maria Regina Mundi a Torre Spaca with concelebrating bishops, Archbishop Rolando Tria Tirona of Nueva Caceres who previously served as the third Bishop of Malolos, Bishop Honesto Ongtioco of Cubao, Bishop Jose Oliveros of Malolos, and other concelebrating priests.

On August 23, 2019, Feast of St. Rose of Lima, They unveil the marker "Pastores de Baliwag", the list of the recent parish priests of the parish from 1733 up to present. It was unveiled with the presence of Msgr. Andres S. Valera, Fr. Joseph Franz Dizon, and Fr. Edgardo Toribio Jr. Also, Valera blessed the Hall of Parish Priests that contains the drawing of the recent parish priests.

=== Diocesan shrine ===
On February 13, 2024, Dennis Villarojo presided over a Concelebrated Solemn Declaration Mass, conferring the title of Dicosesan Shrine upon Baliwag Church. The historical marker was unveiled by Ferdinand Estrella. Villarojo appointed Vicar General and Parish Priest Fr. Narciso S. Sampana as First Rector of the Shrine.

In June 2024, Bishop Villarojo appointed Fr. Carlo Sebastian Mendoza as Parochial Vicar and Fr. Francis Protacio Silvestre Cortez III as Assistant Priest, who replaced Fr. Prince Lenrick P. Marcelo and retired Fr. Virgilio M. Cruz.

The National Historical Commission of the Philippines turned over on 28 November 2024, the rediscovered and restored five-foot wooden late 18th-century statue of Augustine of Hippo. The NHCP Materials Research Conservation Division conserved the image from July to November.

In February 2026, the Diocese of Malolos filed a petition to declare the church a National Cultural Treasure. In August 2026, the church was declared an Important Cultural Property by the National Commission for Culture and the Arts.

Shrine Declaration Ceremony

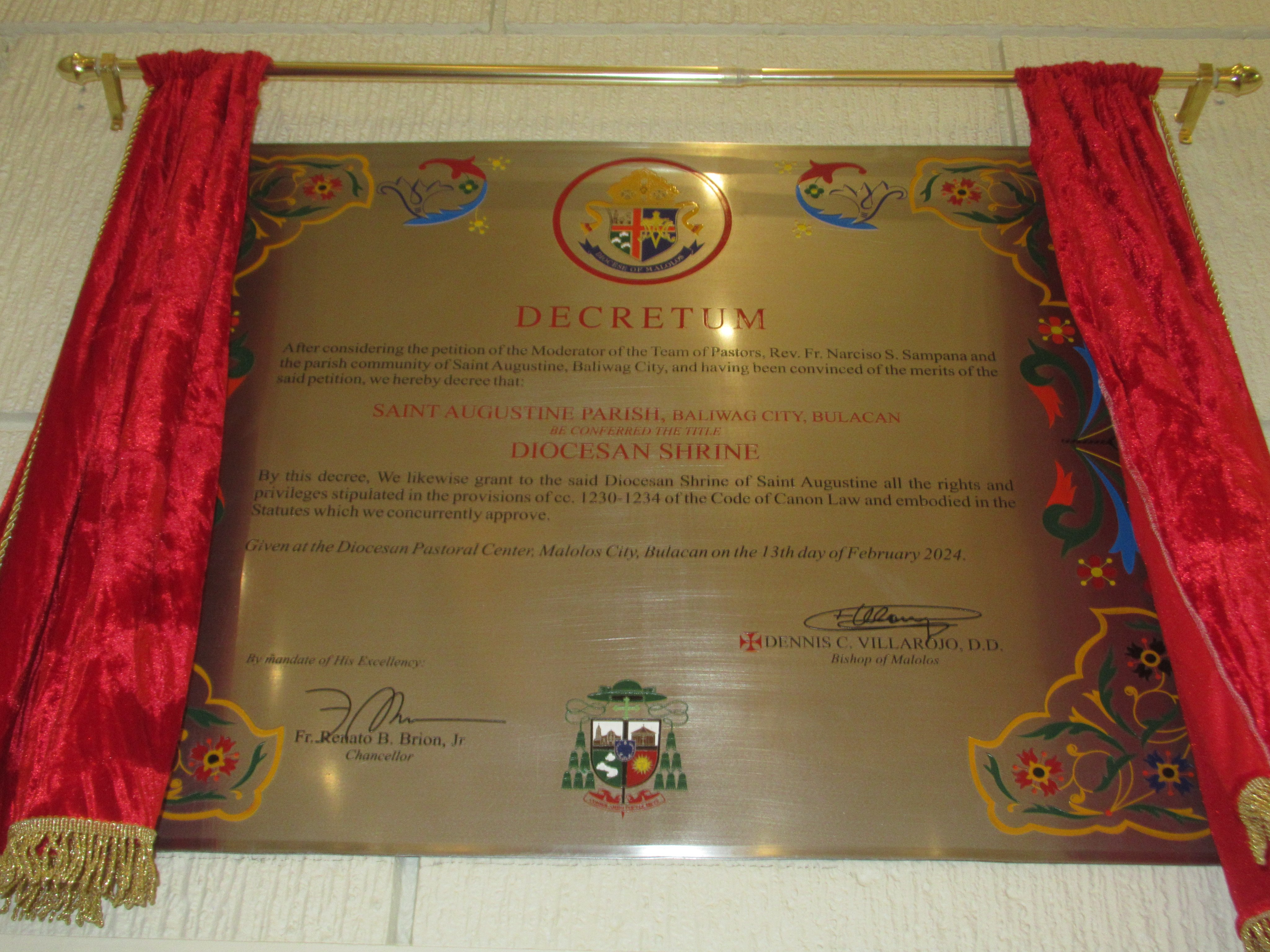
Decretum

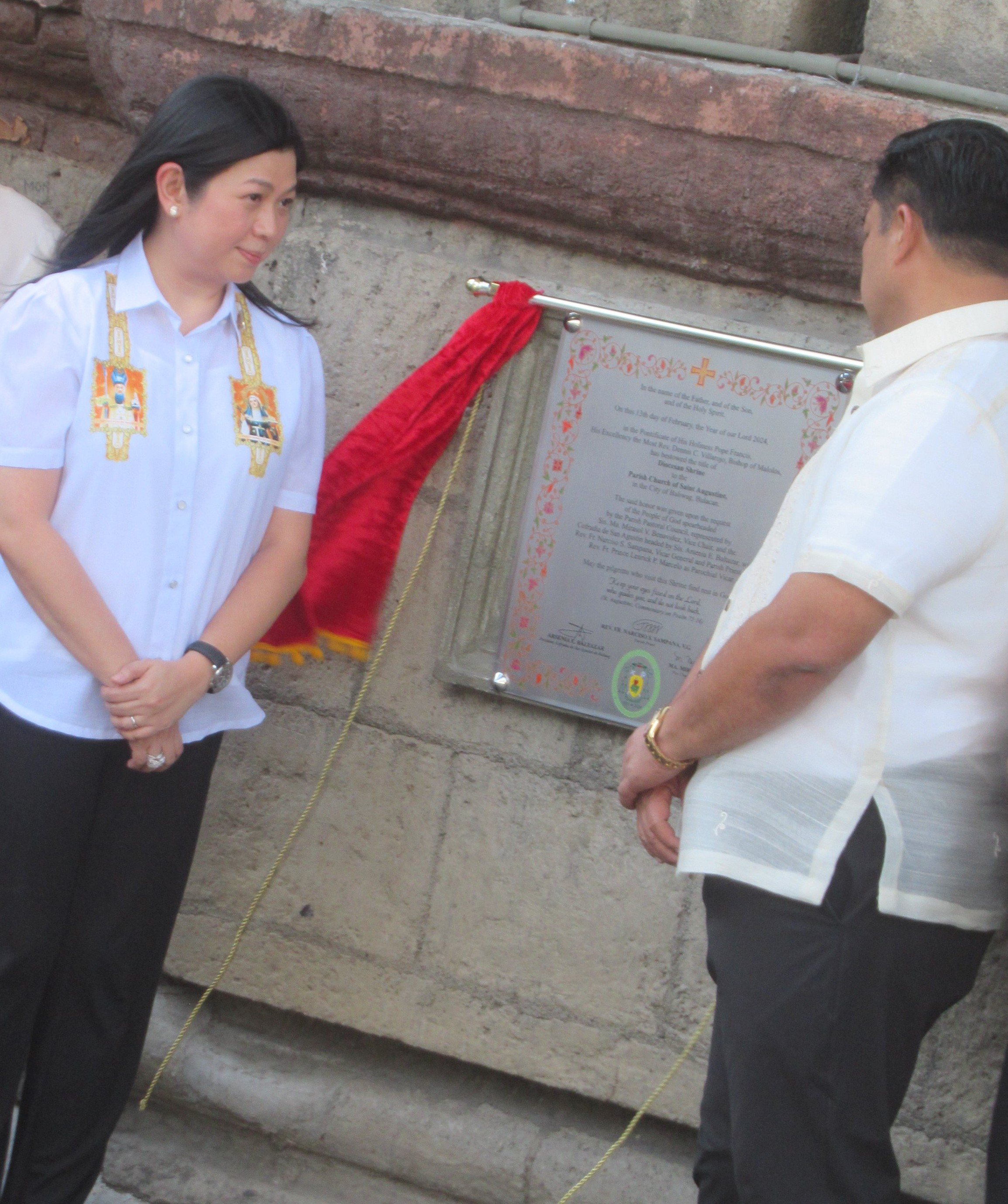
Ferdinand Estrella marker unveiling

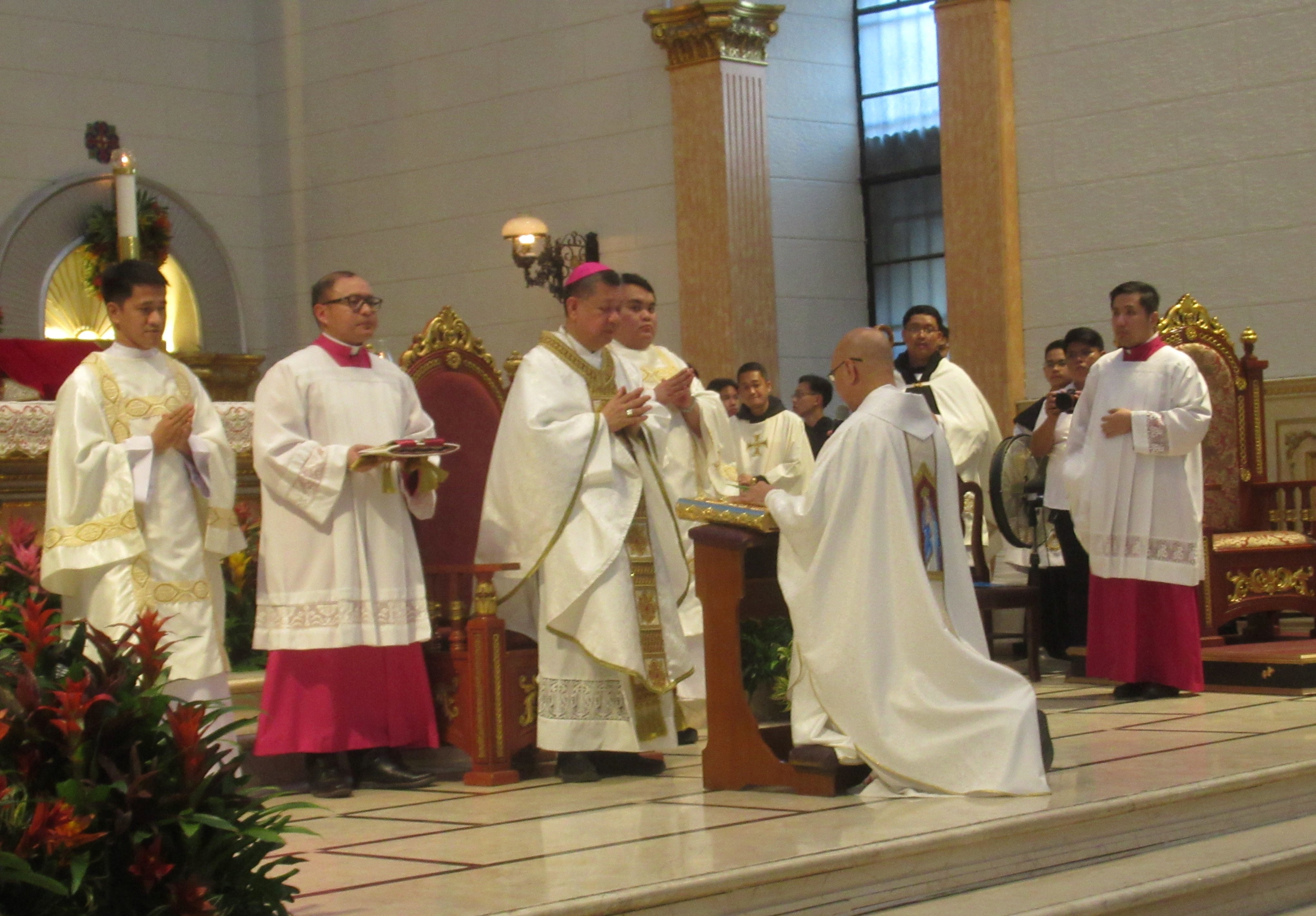
Appointment of Fr. Narciso S. Sampana (First Shrine Rector)

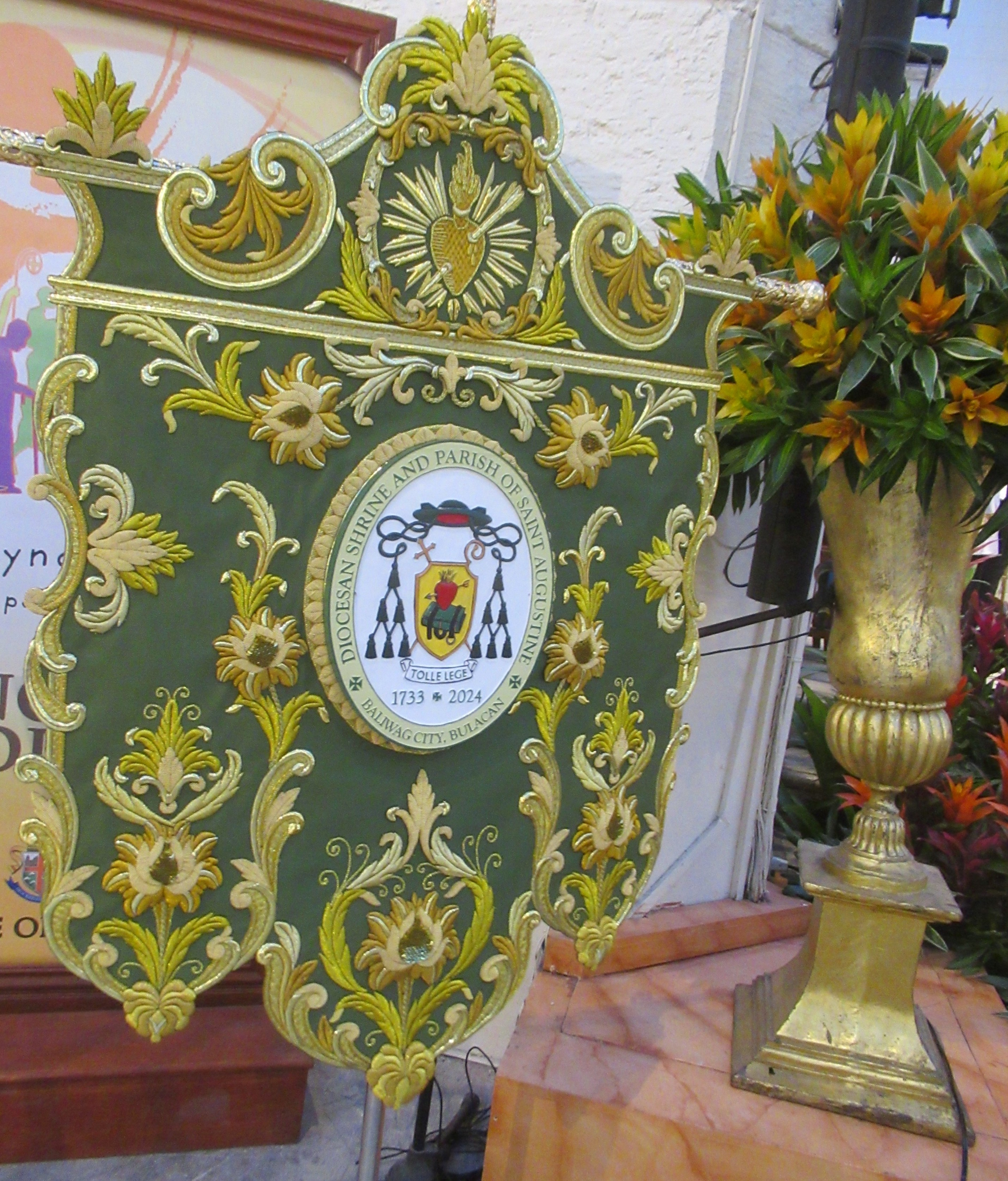
Church Banner

== Architecture ==
Baliwag Church's architectural style is Baroque as evidenced by the facade and interiors. Its massive reredos is massive and a complex work of art reflecting the Spanish and Latin American architecture integration with indigenous Philippines works of art. The church has one of the most imposing buttresses and foundations. Its massive limestone, gravel and sand, steel and bricks structure had been designed to withstand revolts and rebellions, as evidenced by its fortresses facade.

The facade is striking due to the massiveness of its bell tower. The huge relief of Moses at the lower portion was a latter addition that entailed covering up a circular window. In front of the facade is the portico, also a later addition to the building. It covers the outside of the simple main door but with elegant decorations. The stones and bricks of the two-level facade topped by a triangle pediment, are in danger of pulverizing for lack of protective "paletada", which can be readily seen at the right niche wherein portions of the decorative carvings have started to disintegrate (as of 2008).

In front of the church and renovated convent are spacious parking areas for vehicles tightly guarded by a solid iron entrance gate and the entire Church is surrounded by concrete fences.

interior features of Baliwag Church

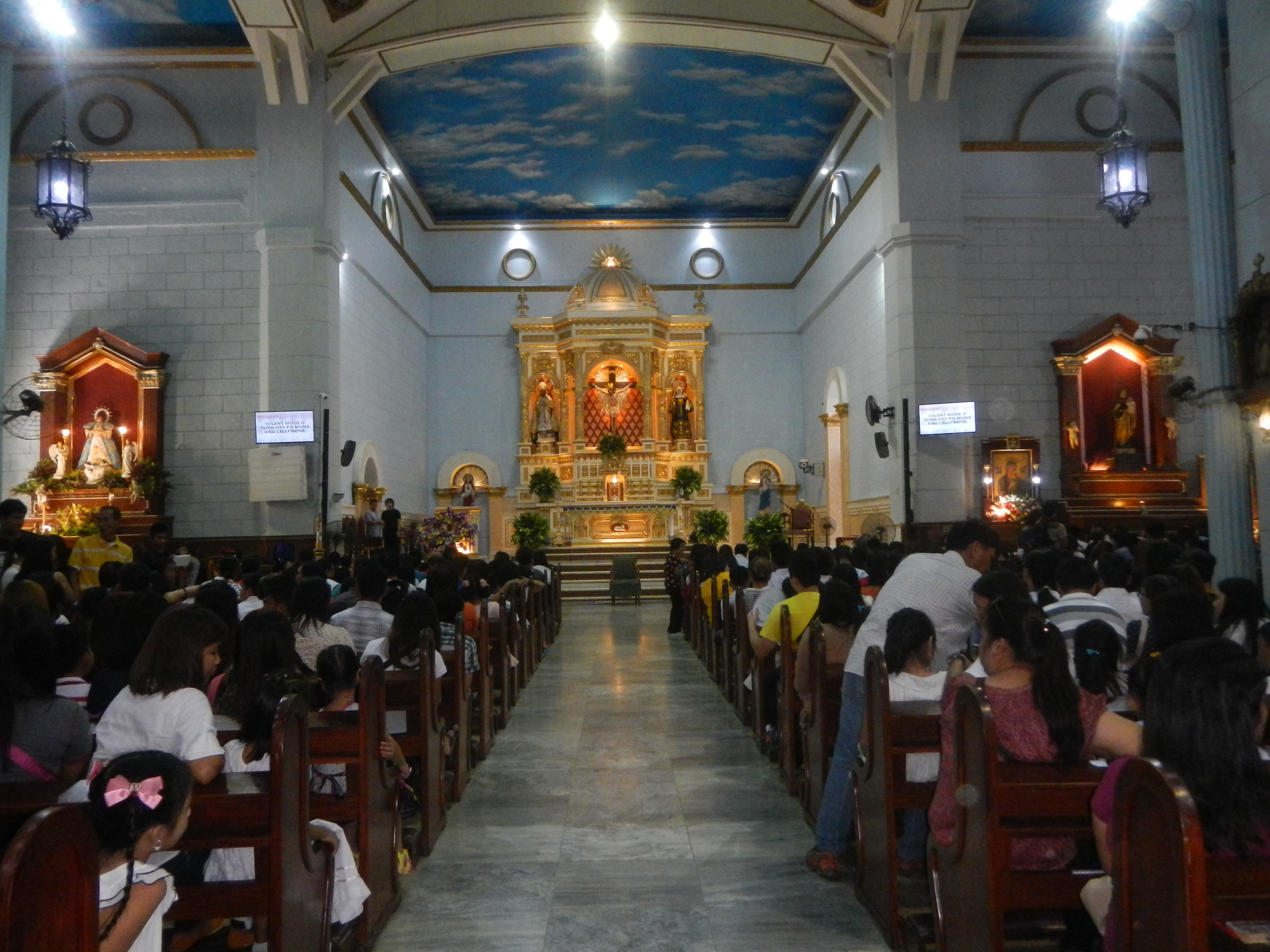
Church interior in 2016

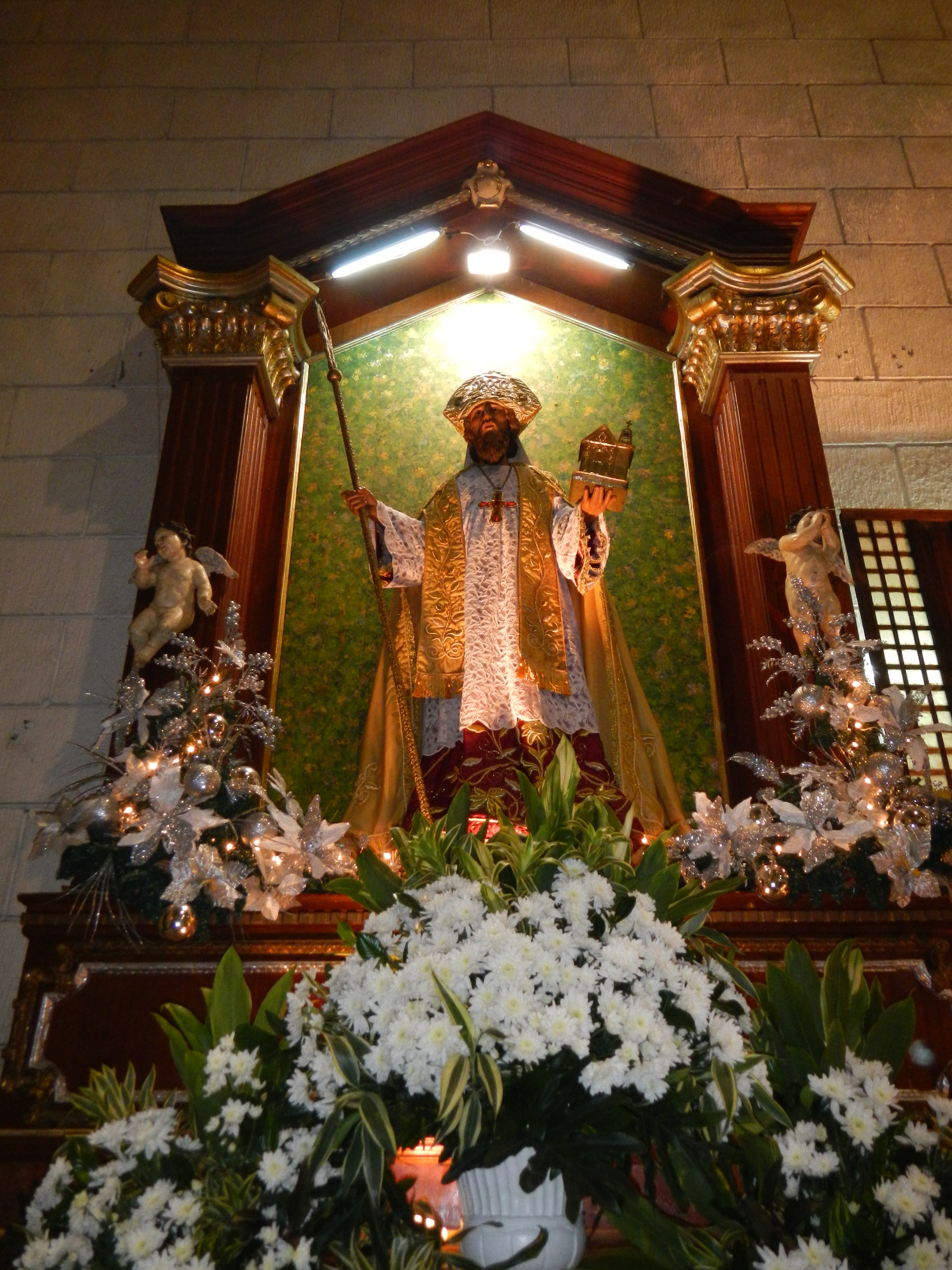
Old Side reredos with St. Augustine of Hippo, the church's patron saint

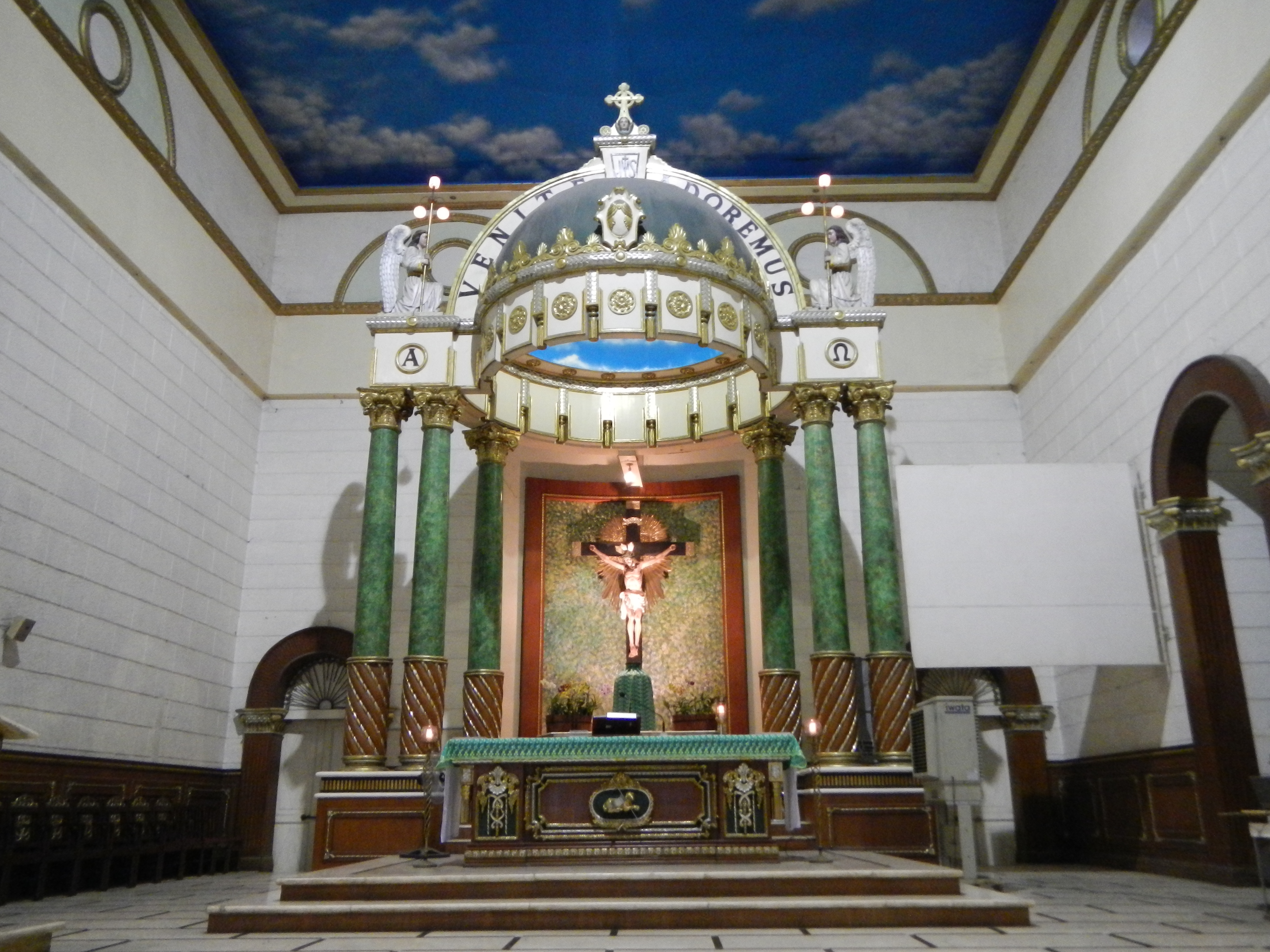
The old main altar and the ciborium above it

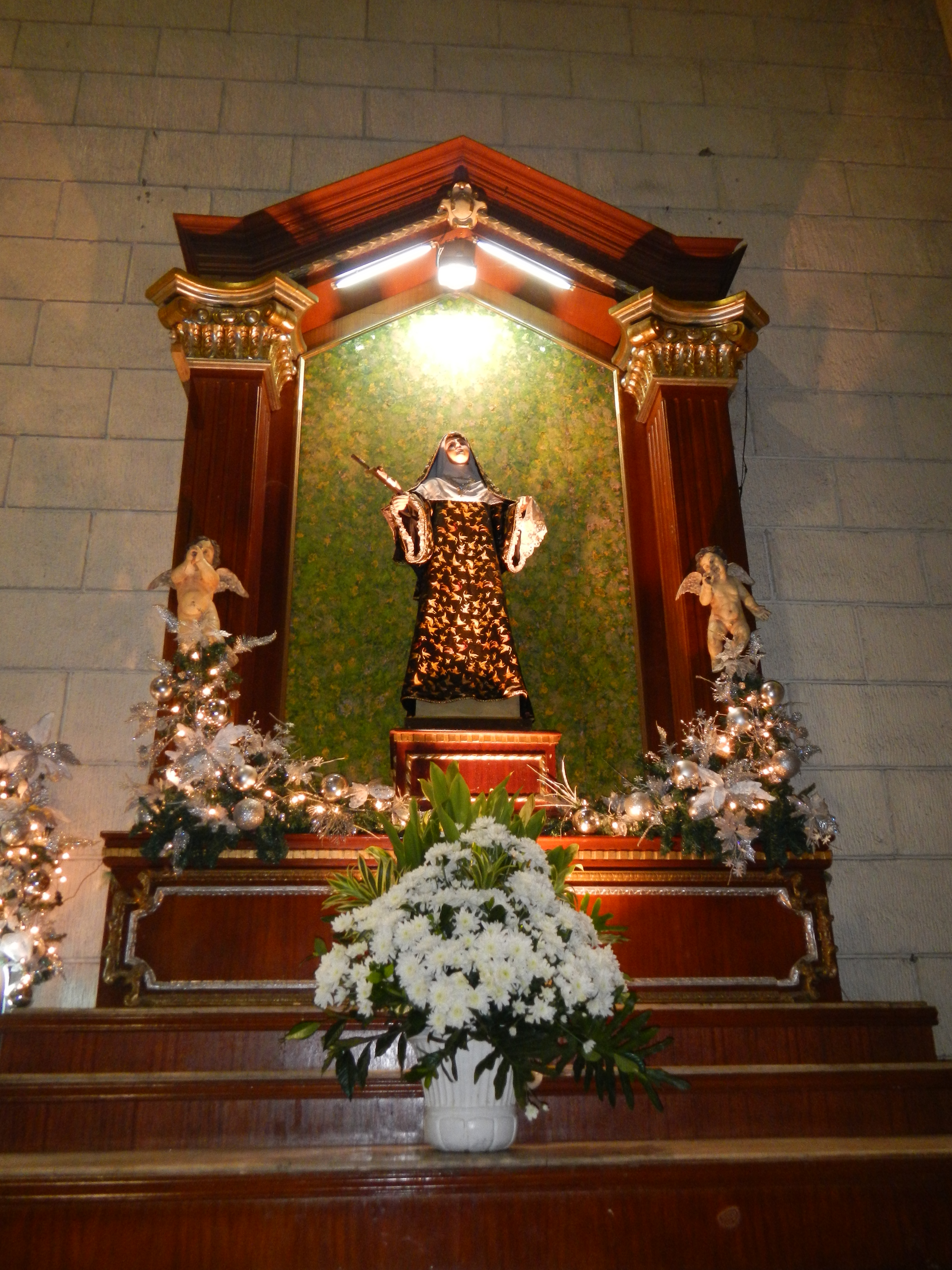
Old Side reredos with St. Monica, the mother of St. Augustine

== Good Friday processions ==
The Baliwag Lenten Procession on Good Friday is one of the longest Lenten procession in the Philippines. The procession around the town is joined by the parishioners along with floats (carozas or carriages) of life-size dioramas depicting scenes during the time of Jesus. The families of Baliwag launch over a hundred richly adorned giant floats depicting the passion of Jesus Christ. In 2012 the procession included 93 carriages; in 2013, 102 carriages.in 2015 the procession included 112 carriages, in 2016 114 carriages were included, in 2017, 117 carriages, and this year 2018, This procession now includes 118 carriages It is also one of only two parishes to feature more than 110 floats, the other being the San Isidro Labrador Church from the nearby town of Pulilan, and by 2019 there are now 123 (121 + 3 additional carriages: 121A (Palm Sunday), 121B (Holy Wednesday) and 121C (Good Friday)). In 2020, one carroza was added to the list and in 2021, the number of carrozas is at 124.

Held every Holy Wednesday and Good Friday, the procession starts in the early evening, commonly at around 6:00 PM and it is viewed by local and foreign tourists, an anticipated attraction during Holy Week in Baliwag.

== See also ==
- Our Lady of Most Holy Rosary Parish Church (Barangay Makinabang)
- Sub-Parish Church of Sto. Cristo (Barangay Sto. Cristo)
