= Sub-Parish Church of Santo Cristo =

Roman Catholic church in Bulacan, Philippines

Santo Cristo Sub-Parish Church
- Bisita ng Mahal na Señor Santo Cristo de Baliuag (Filipino)
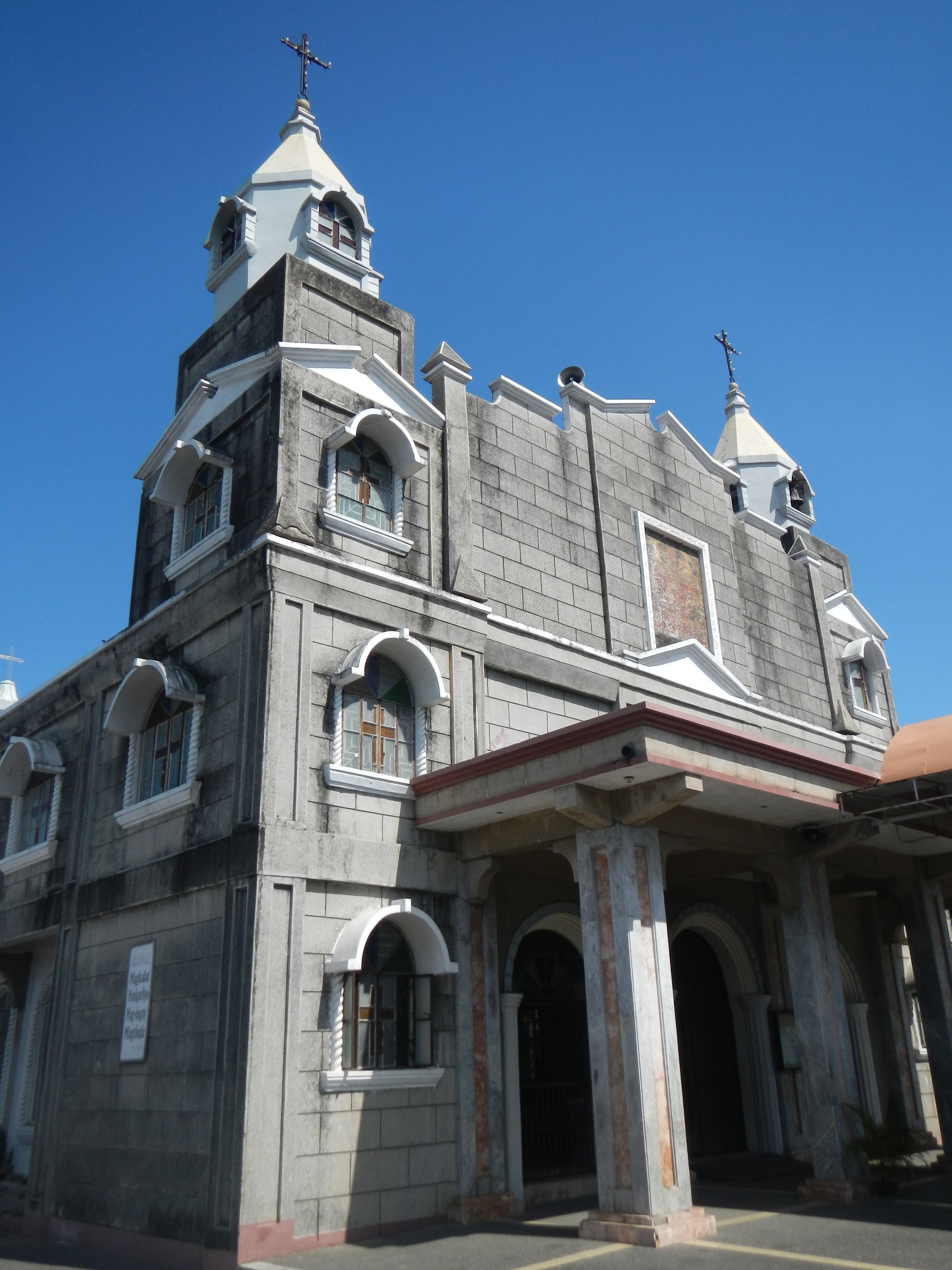
- Church facade in 2013

- Location in Bulacan Location in Luzon Location in the Philippines
- 14°57′20″N 120°53′39″E
- Location: Sto. Cristo, Baliuag, Bulacan
- Country: Philippines
- Denomination: Roman Catholic

History
- Status: Sub-Parish Church, Saint Augustine Parish, Baliwag

Architecture
- Functional status: active
- Groundbreaking: 1881
- Completed: 1981 (Inauguration)

Specifications
- Materials: steel, mixed sand, gravel & cement

Administration
- Archdiocese: Manila
- Diocese: Malolos
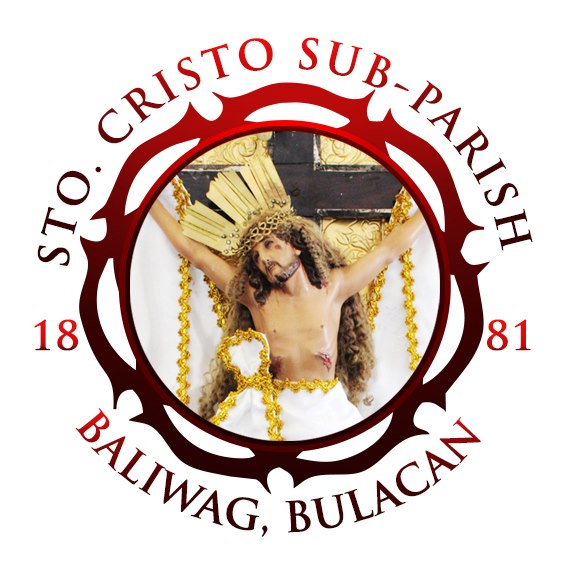

Santo Cristo Sub-Parish Church, locally known as the Bisita ng Mahal na Señor Santo Cristo de Baliuag and Apo Kristo Chapel, is the oldest "ermita" (chapel) in Baliuag, Bulacan, Philippines. The visita is under the jurisdiction of the Diocese of Malolos and is bounded by the cities of San Fernando and Mabalacat in Pampanga, and Balanga in Bataan. At present, its mother Parish, the Saint Augustine Parish Church of Baliuag, Bulacan (under its first parish priest Juan de Albarrran), has 4 parishes.

The St. Augustine Church of Baliuag and the Sub-Parish Church of Santo Cristo both belong to the Roman Catholic Diocese of Malolos (which was created on November 25, 1961, and erected on March 11, 1962, and comprises the civil province of Bulacan and the City of Valenzuela, under the Patronage of the Immaculate Conception, Feast day of December 8). The Bisita ng Santo Kristo is under Saint Augustine Parish Church jurisdiction.

== History ==
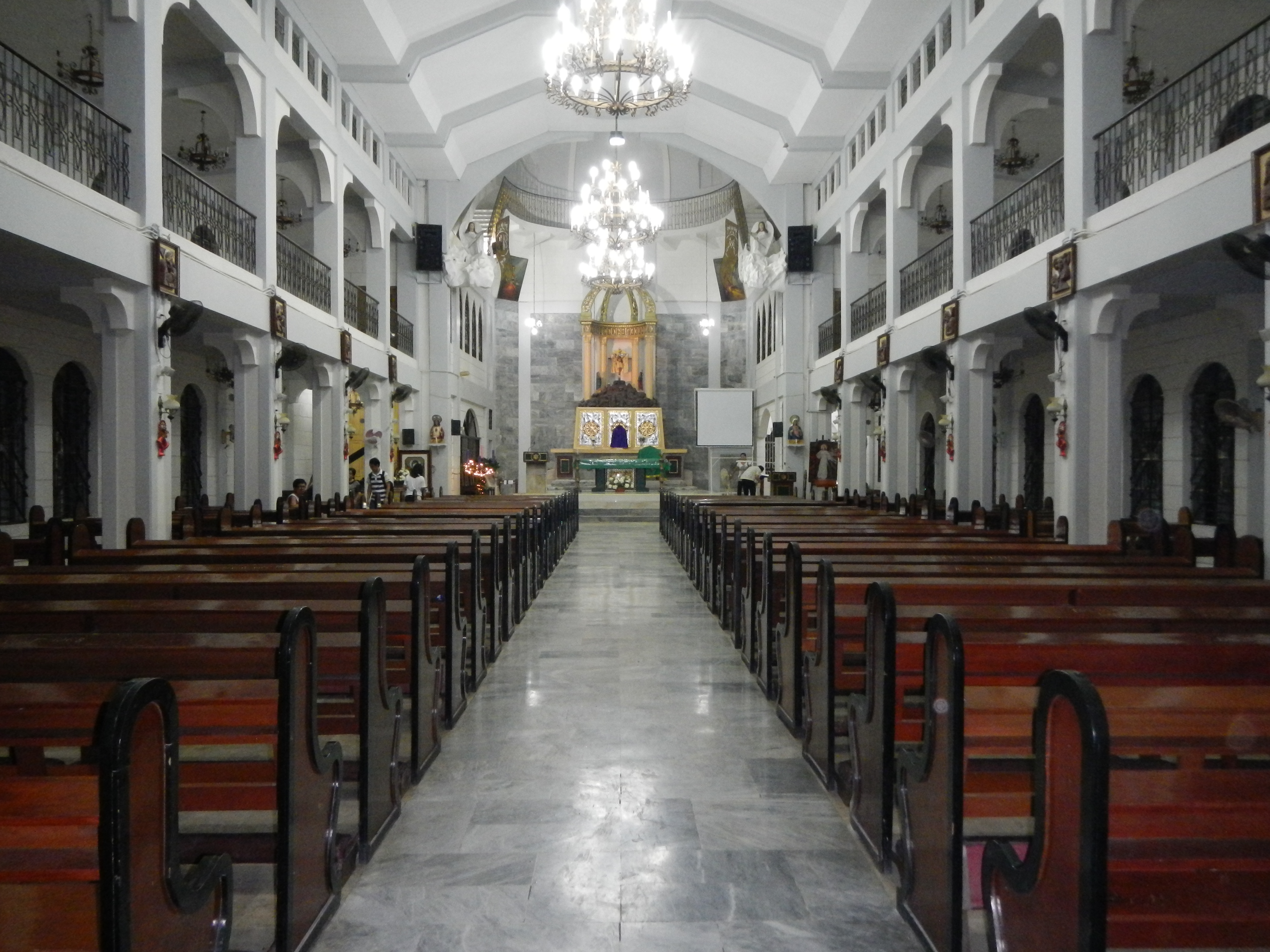
Church interior in 2012

During the Spanish colonization period of the 1880s, the settlement, baryo of Baliuag, had no name until it was called "Santo Cristo." The Feast Day was celebrated annually on May 3, led by a "President" of the Fiesta. Brother Juan was the first, while Kabisera Andres Ramos was the caretaker of the Statue or Holy Image, according to writer Alejandro Fernando. They chose the "Hubad" (naked) Kristo as their Patron due to poverty. Ever since, immigrants and pilgrims from many provinces have visited the miraculous statue of the Chapel on Fridays and Sundays. More than 12 local and visitor's faith healers conducted regular Friday spiritual healing there. Nipa leaves and bamboo were used to build the small Kapilya.

During the American regime, Jeremiah James Harty [(November 5, 1853—October 29, 1927, an American prelate of the Catholic Church, the Archbishop of Manila in the Philippines from 1903 to 1916) who later served as Archbishop of Omaha from 1916 to 1927)] filed a suit in the Court of First Instance of Bulacan, claiming title of the Santo Cristo, Baliuag, Bulacan Parish Church property on 1909. The prelate included in the civil case, the properties where the San Jose and Makinabang Parish Churches were built upon.

The defendants filed an answer by way of opposition thereto. The residents alleging, inter alia, that the subject real estate is owned by them by virtue of a Deed of Donation signed by Don Julian Buyson. This Spanish Mestizo was a philanthropist who bestowed upon the natives of the Santo Cristo neighborhood the lot where an "ermita" or Bisita was built for religious and liturgical needs of the townsfolk, per a notarial Document dated August 1, 1881. The condition specified in the public document that the chapel and school built upon the lot must be used by and for the neighborhood residents for devotional purposes.

Further, the Deed required the administration of the property by a) Hermano Mayor (Elder), b) Mayor domo (Steward) and c) Secretaryo (Secretary). Willie Buyson Villarama, Gloria Macapagal Arroyo's former chief of staff, from Bacolor, Pampanga stated that "his great-great-great grandfather is Don Julian Buyson, who served as a gobernadorcillo, xxx".

The CFI of Malolos Auxiliary Judge Buenaventura Reyes dismissed the Archbishop's complaint for recovery of possession and title. Later, in 1930, the Bulacan Court ordered the Registry of Property to issue Original Certificates of Titles to the 3 donated properties in the names of the 3 emitas or kapilyas: Ermita de Santo Cristo, Ermita de San Jose Parish Churches of Santo Cristo, Makinabang and Concepcion, Baliuag, Bulacan.

Later, the people acquired the adjacent lot where they built the grandstand and 4 comfort rooms. On its 100th anniversary on May 3, 1981, the Santo Cristo Parish Church was inaugurated under the leadership of Mauricio Pascual.

Since 1988, Santo Cristo Church is presently under the care and administration of the Sub-Parish Pastoral Council of Barangay Santo Cristo, Baliuag, Bulacan.

Past presidents of Pastoral Council Sub-Parish of Sto. Cristo were: Donato A. Pascual 1988–1990; Engr. Precioso Donato F. Punzalan 1990–1992; Arsenio Mangalile 1992–1994; Herminio S. Toribio 1994–1998; Boy Pascual and Belen Marcelo. The present President is Amelia Santos.

== Gallery ==
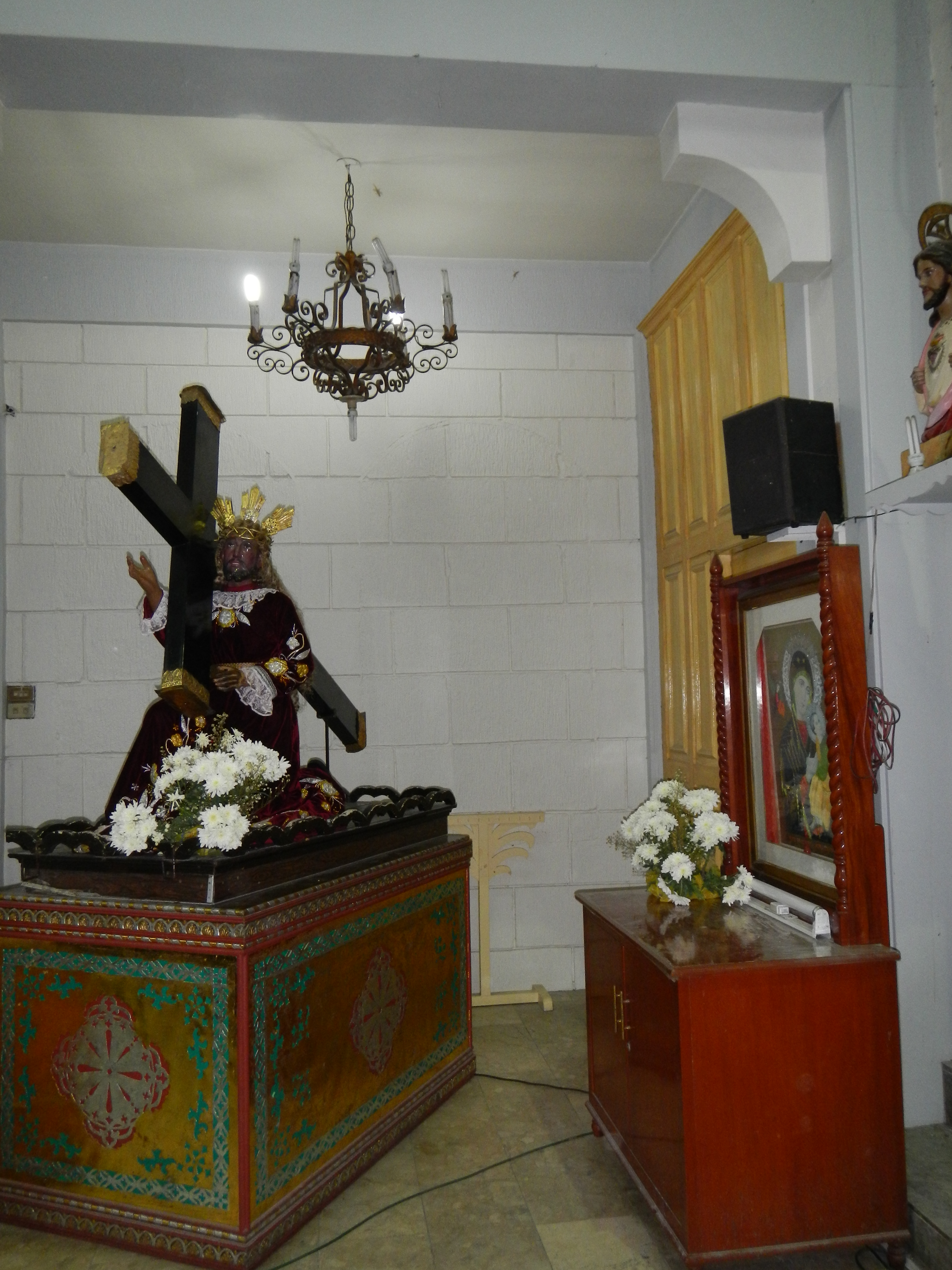
Black Nazarene

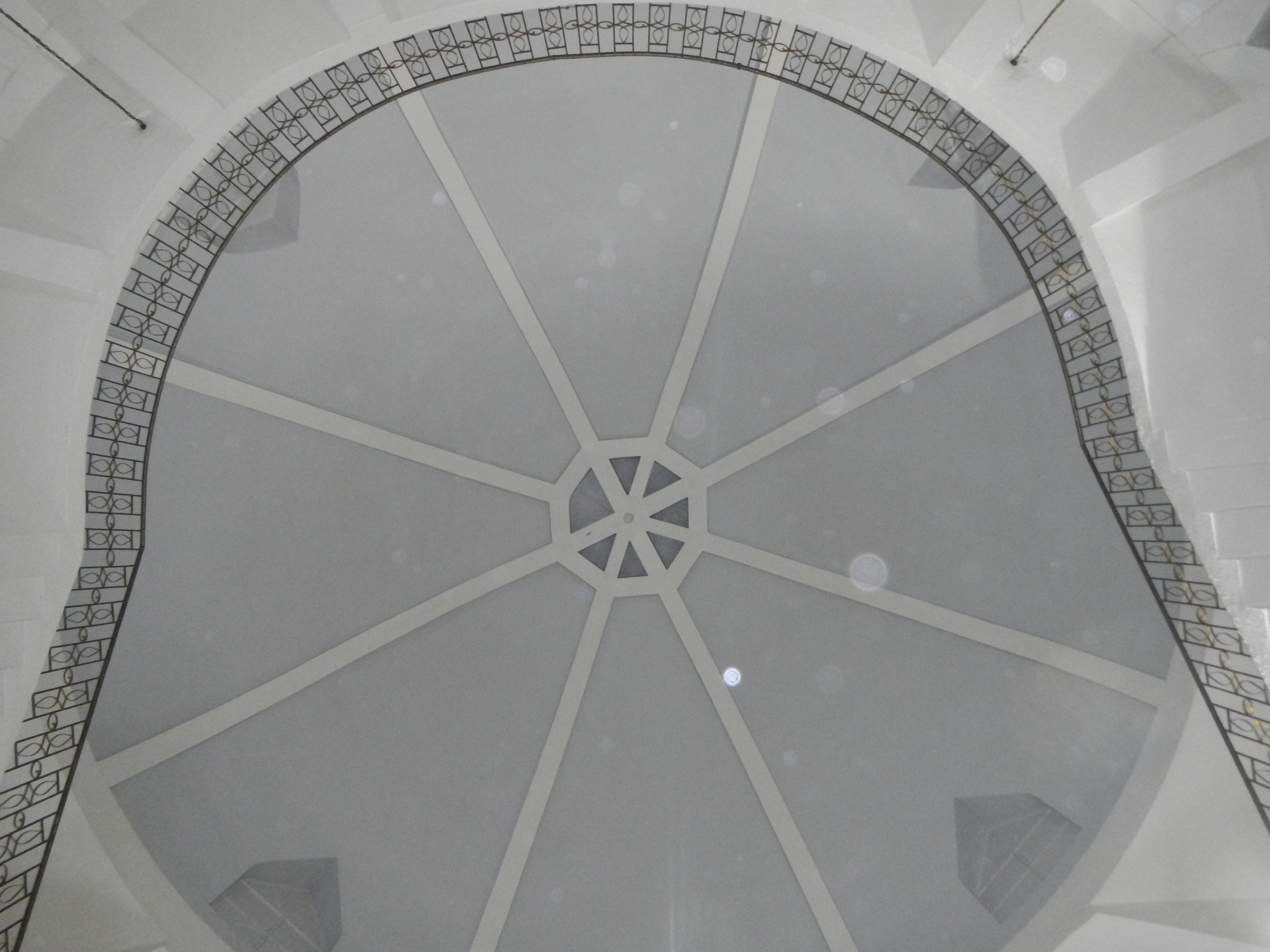
Dome

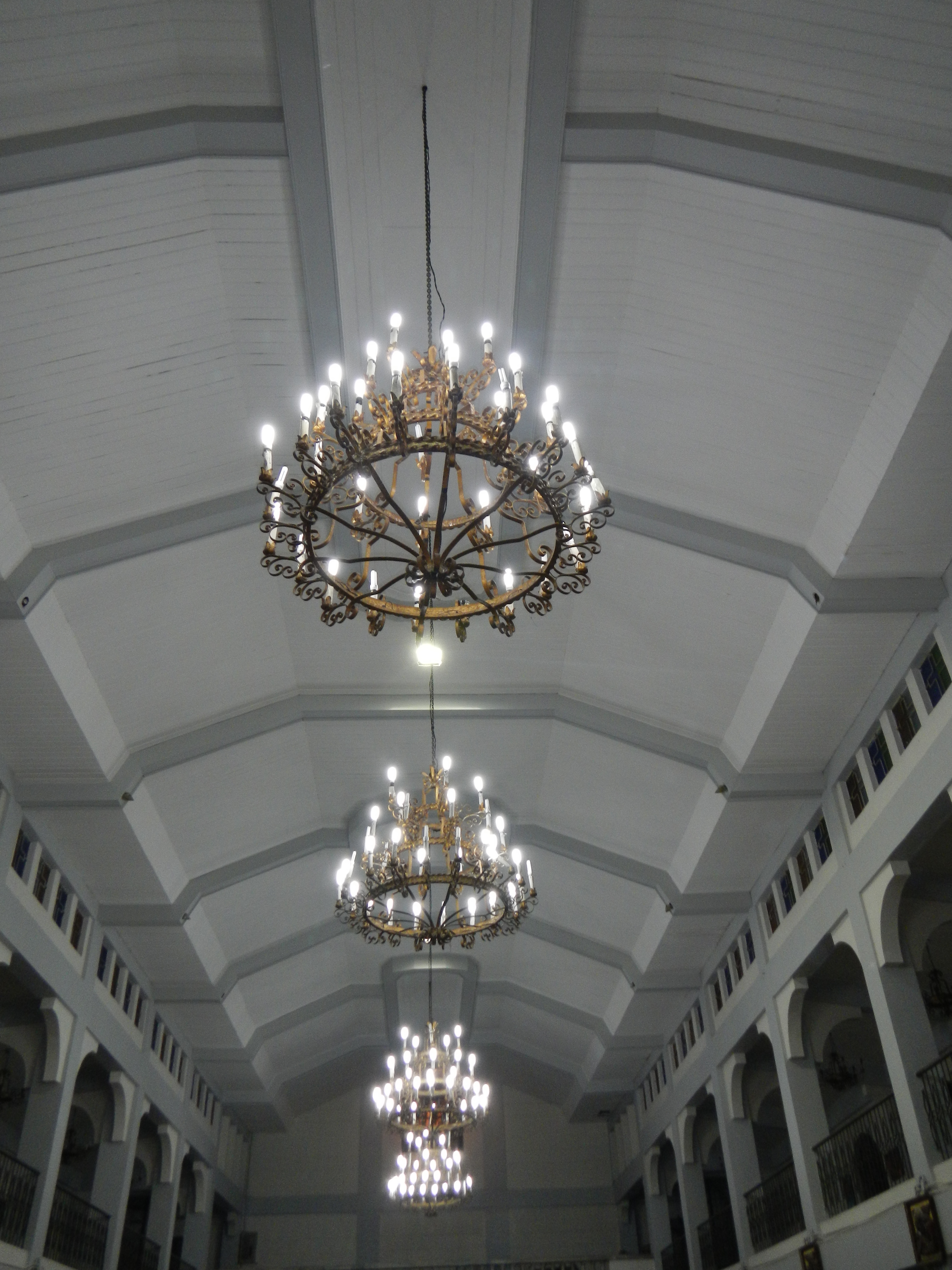
Ceiling

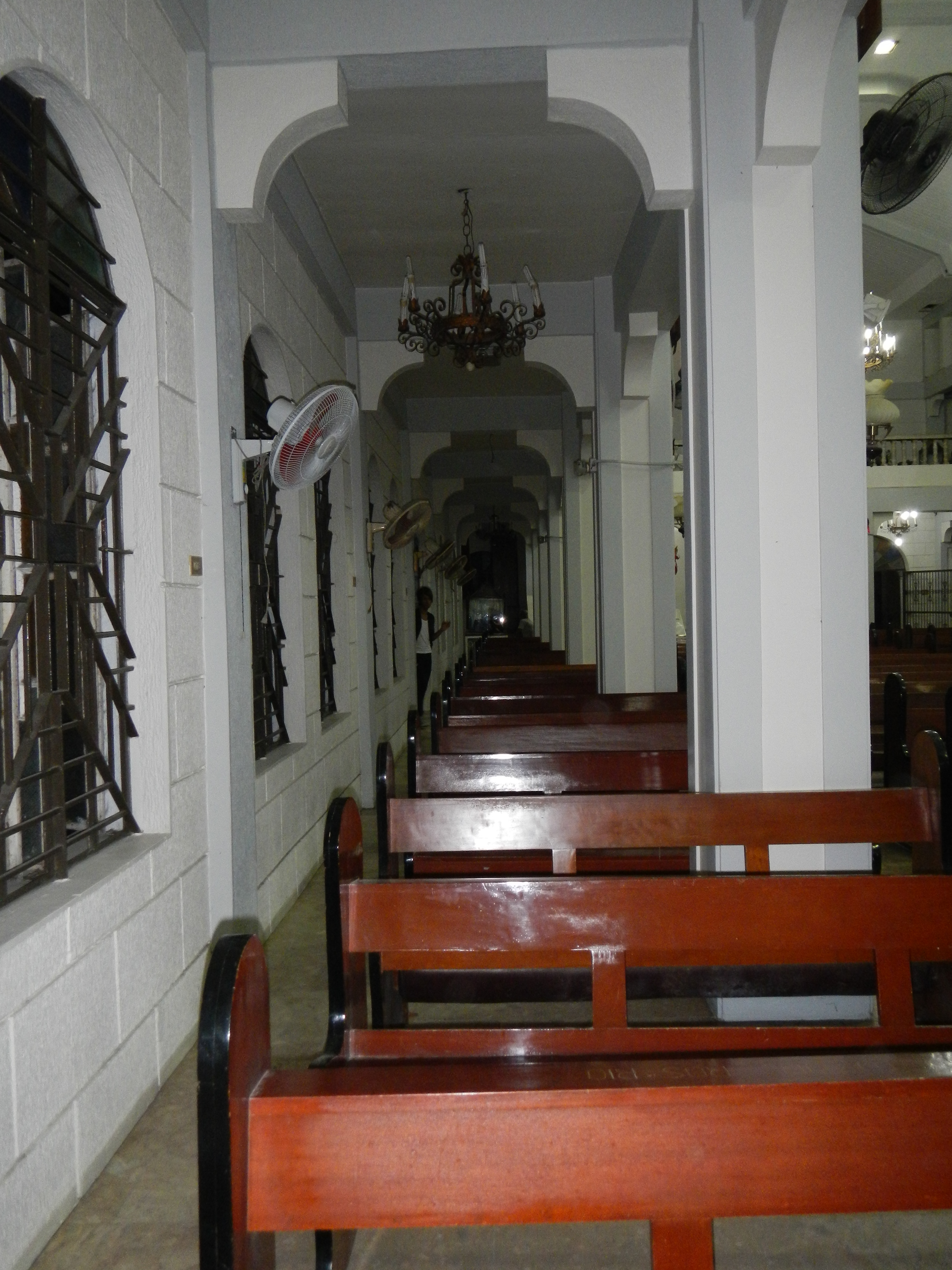
Side altar

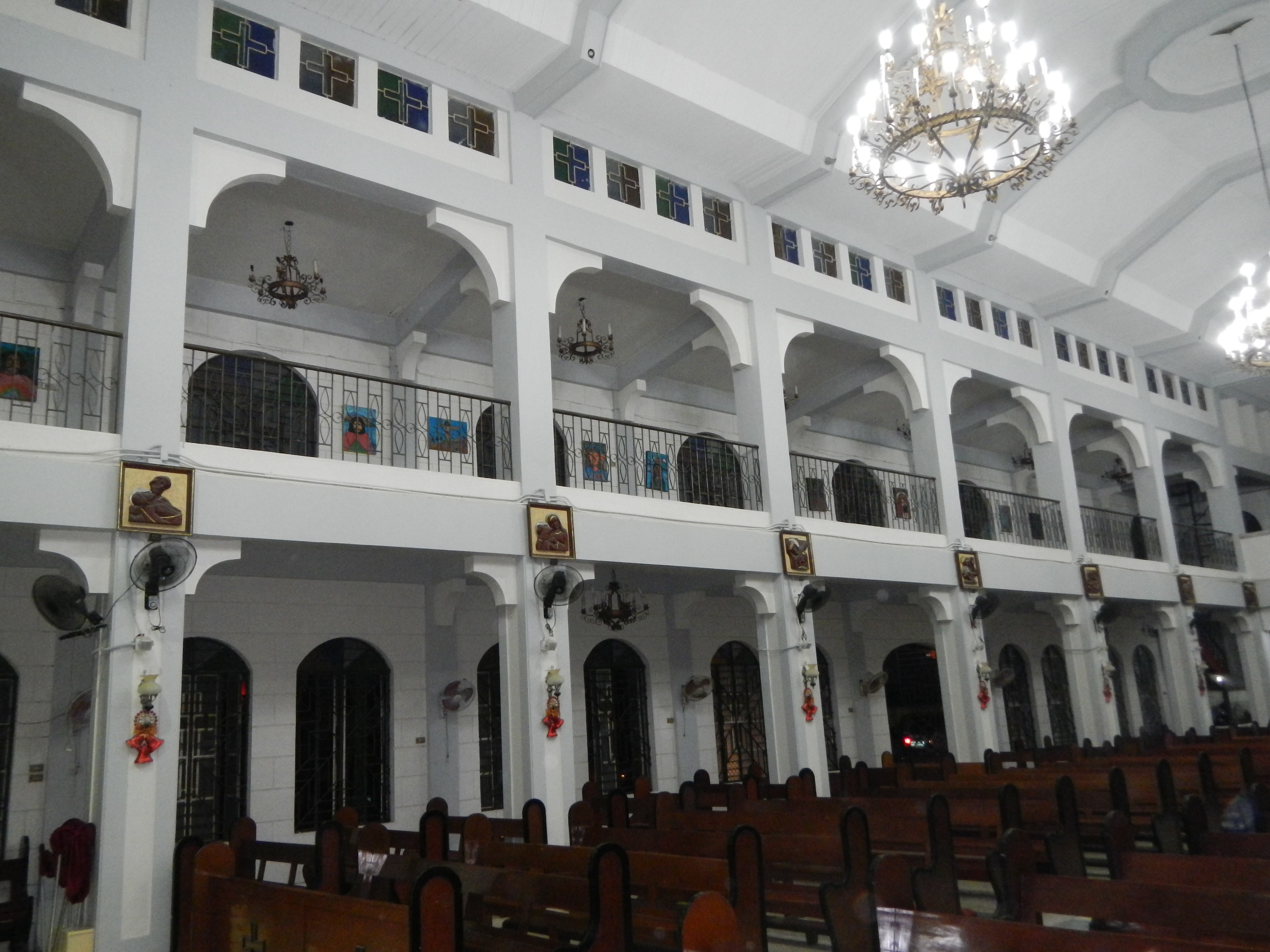
Left side interior

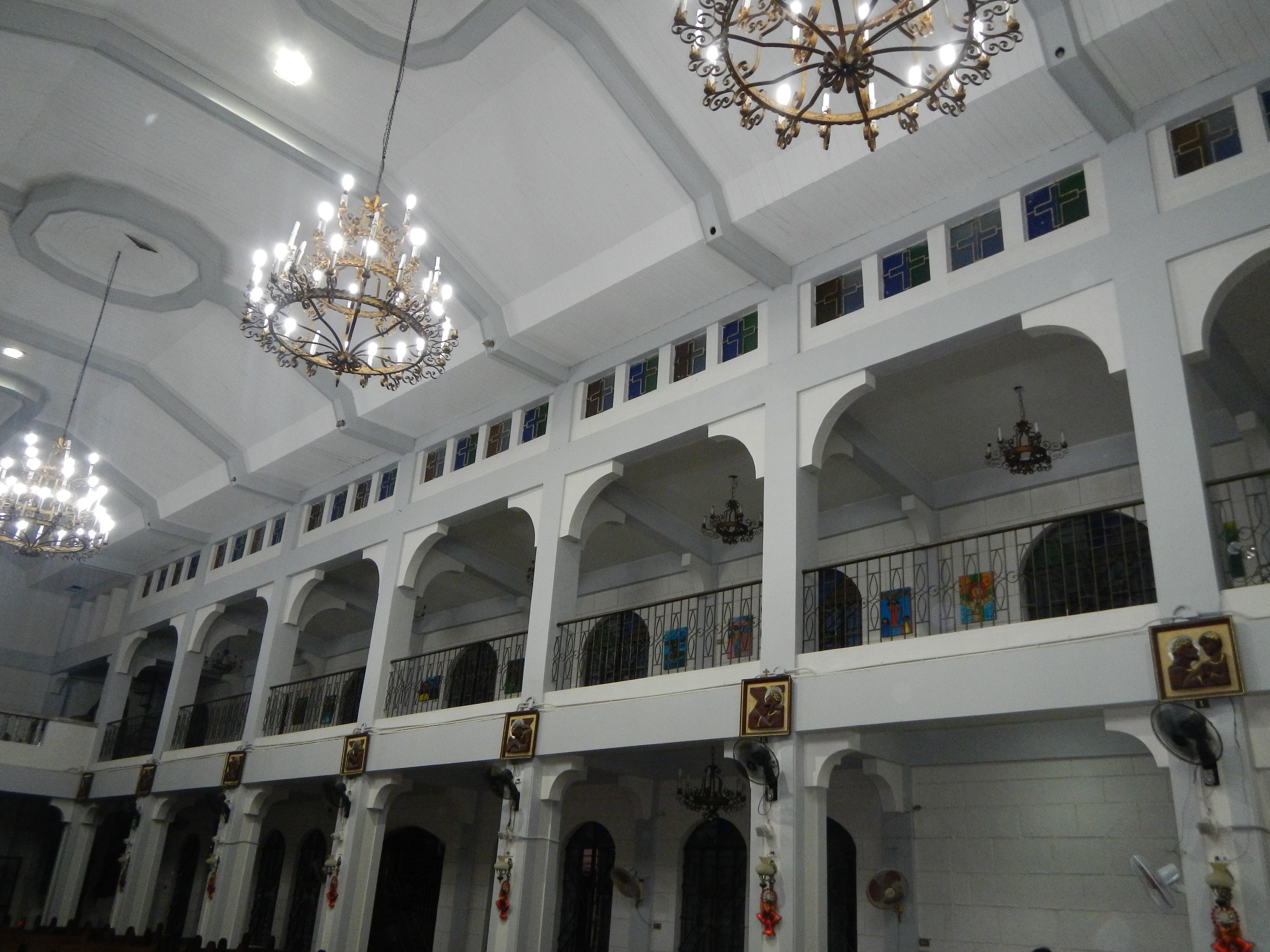
Right side interior

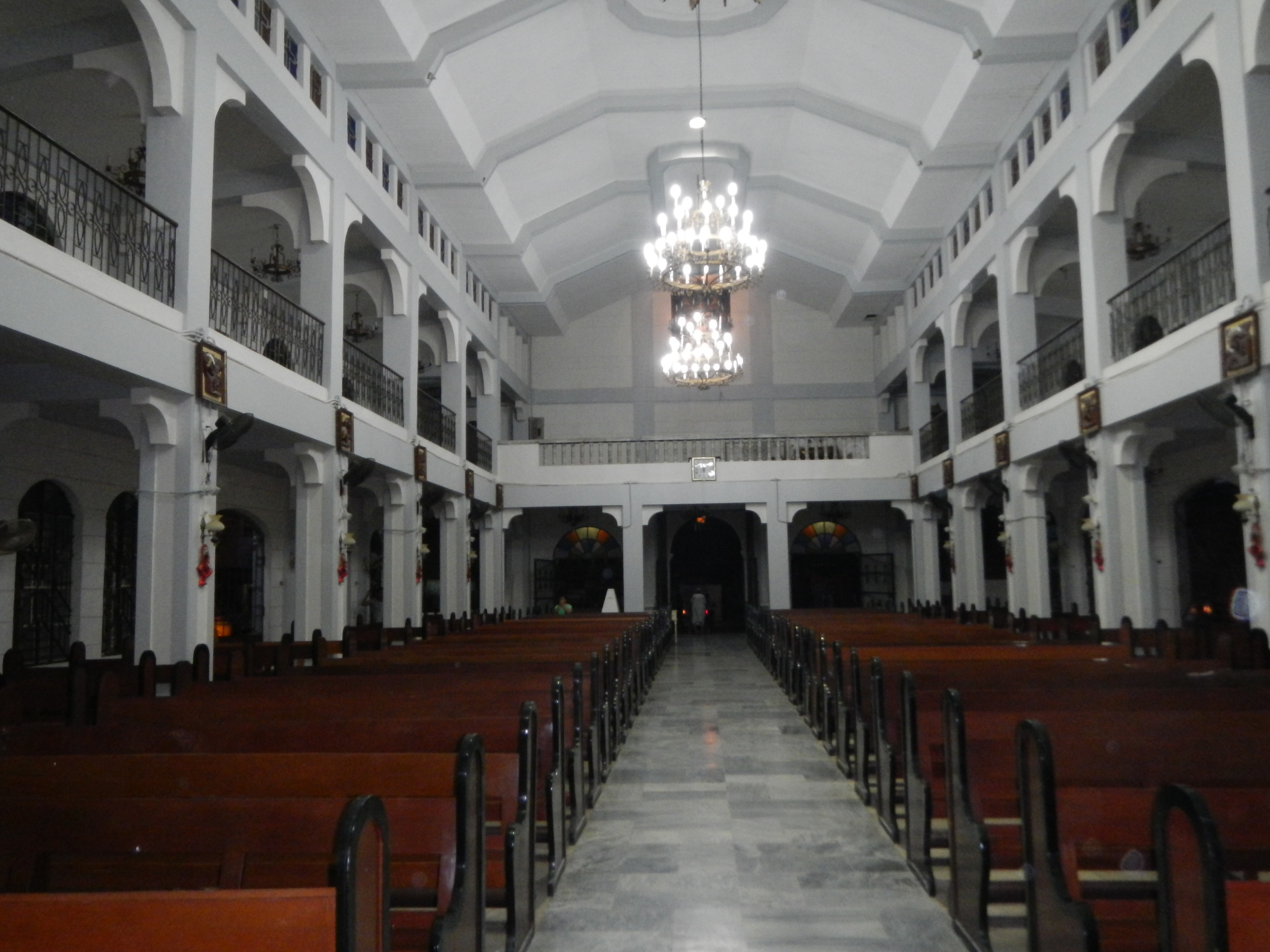
Interior to main door

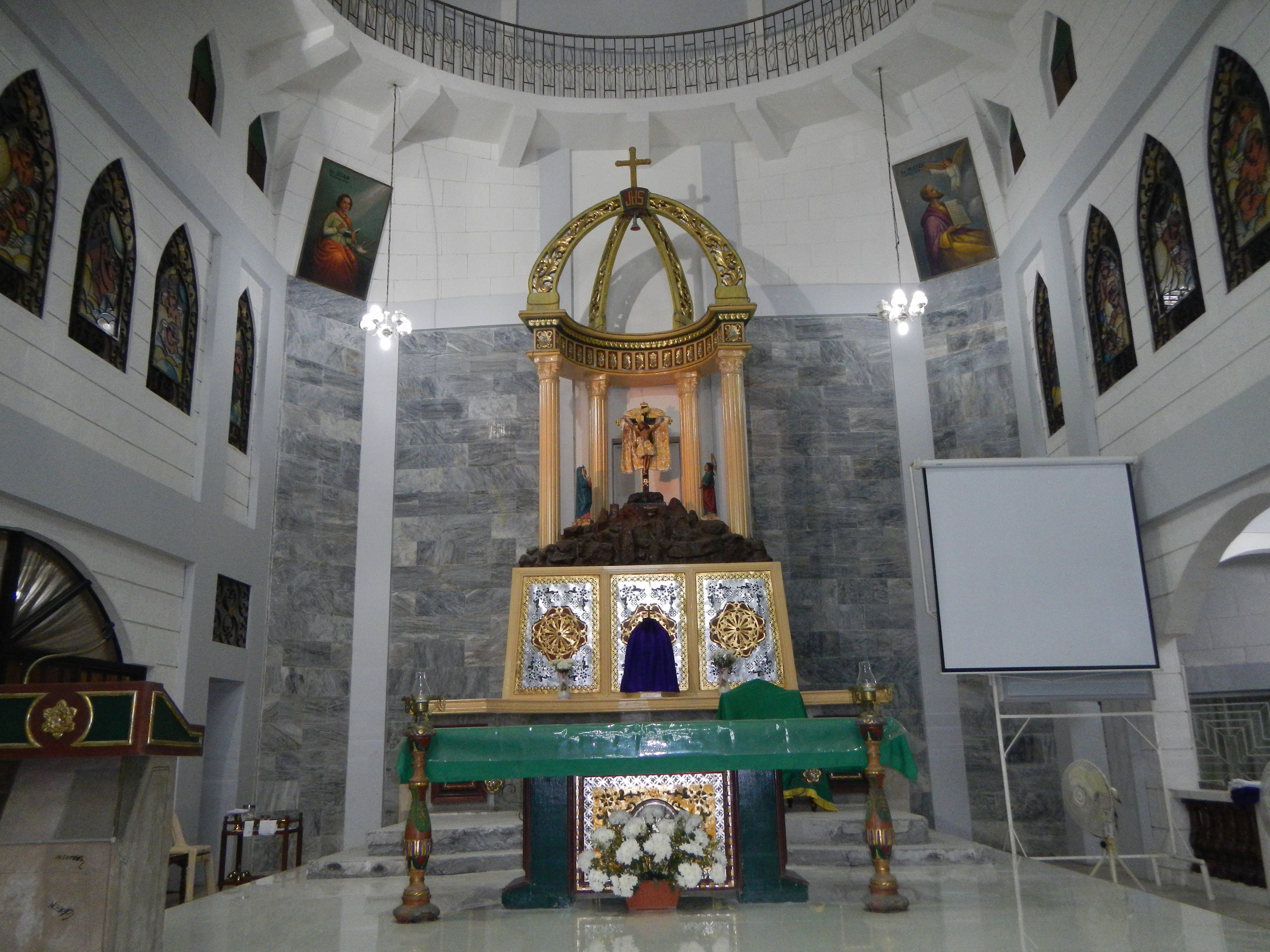
Sanctuary, showing the main altar of Apo Kristo

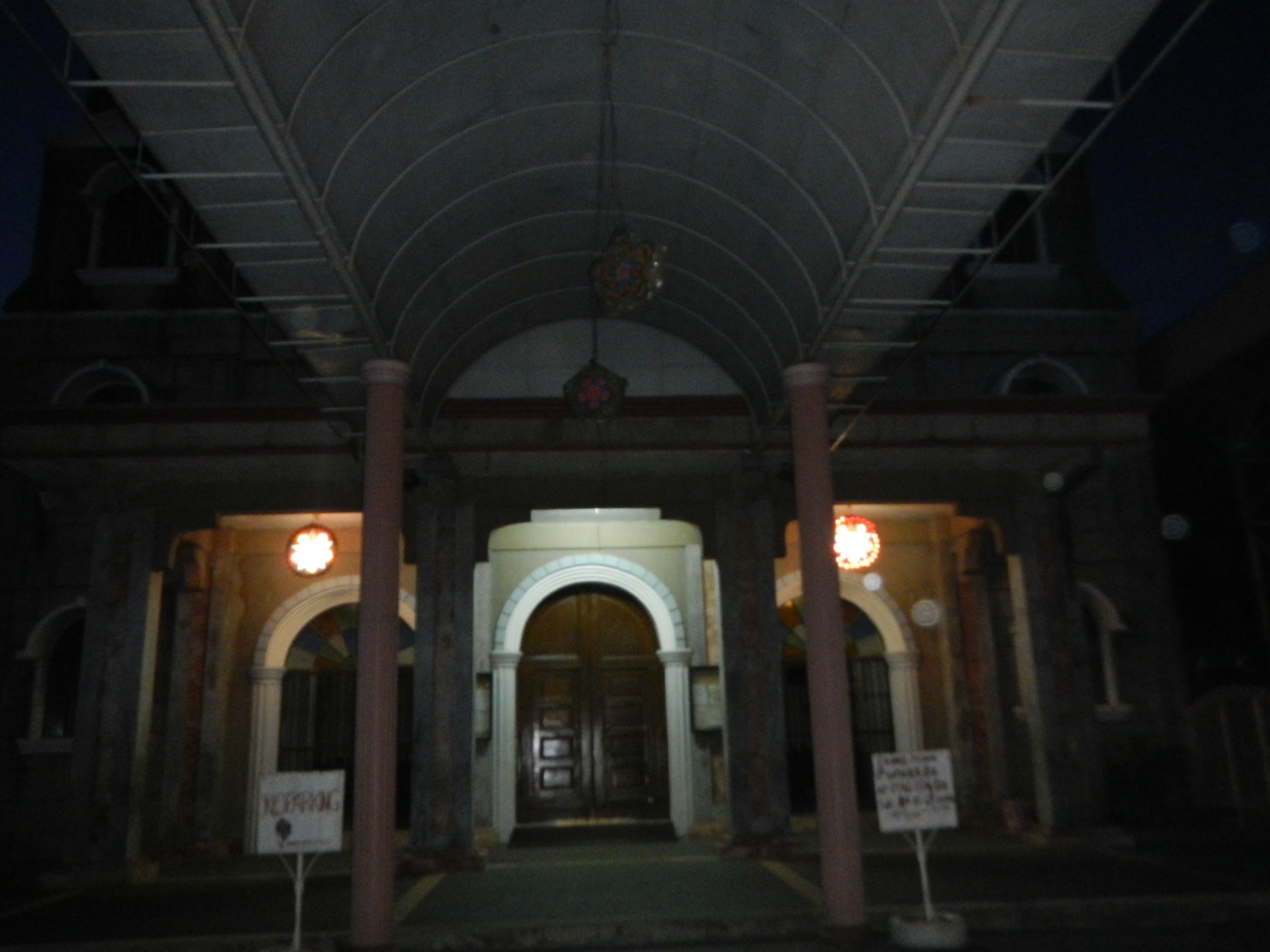
Canopy, main door entrance

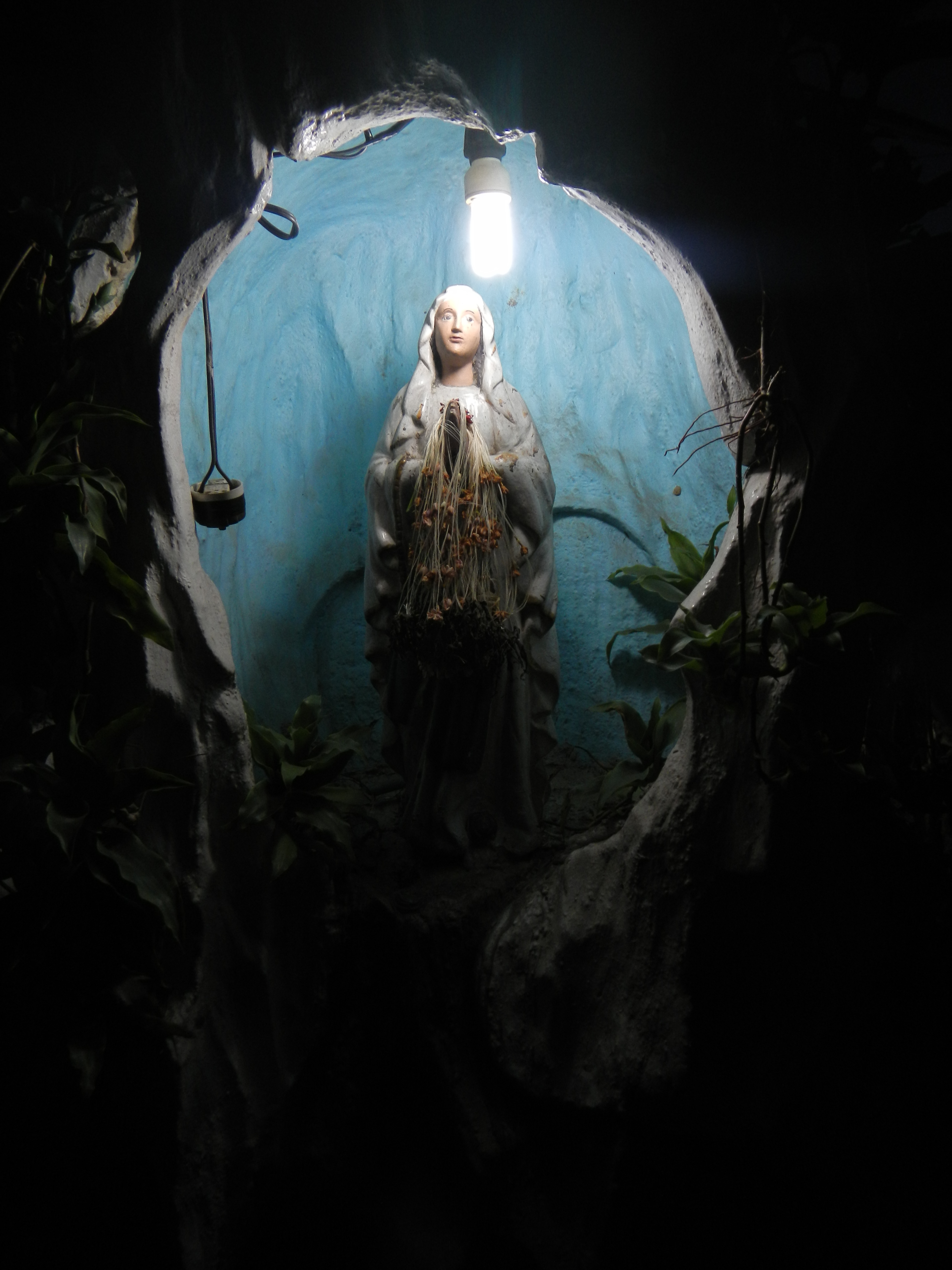
Our Lady of Lourdes Grotto
