= Our Lady of Most Holy Rosary Parish Church (Makinabang) =

Roman Catholic church in Bulacan, Philippines

Makinabang Church
- Our Lady of Most Holy Rosary Parish
- Iglesia Parroquial de Nuestra Señora del Santísimo Rosario (Spanish)
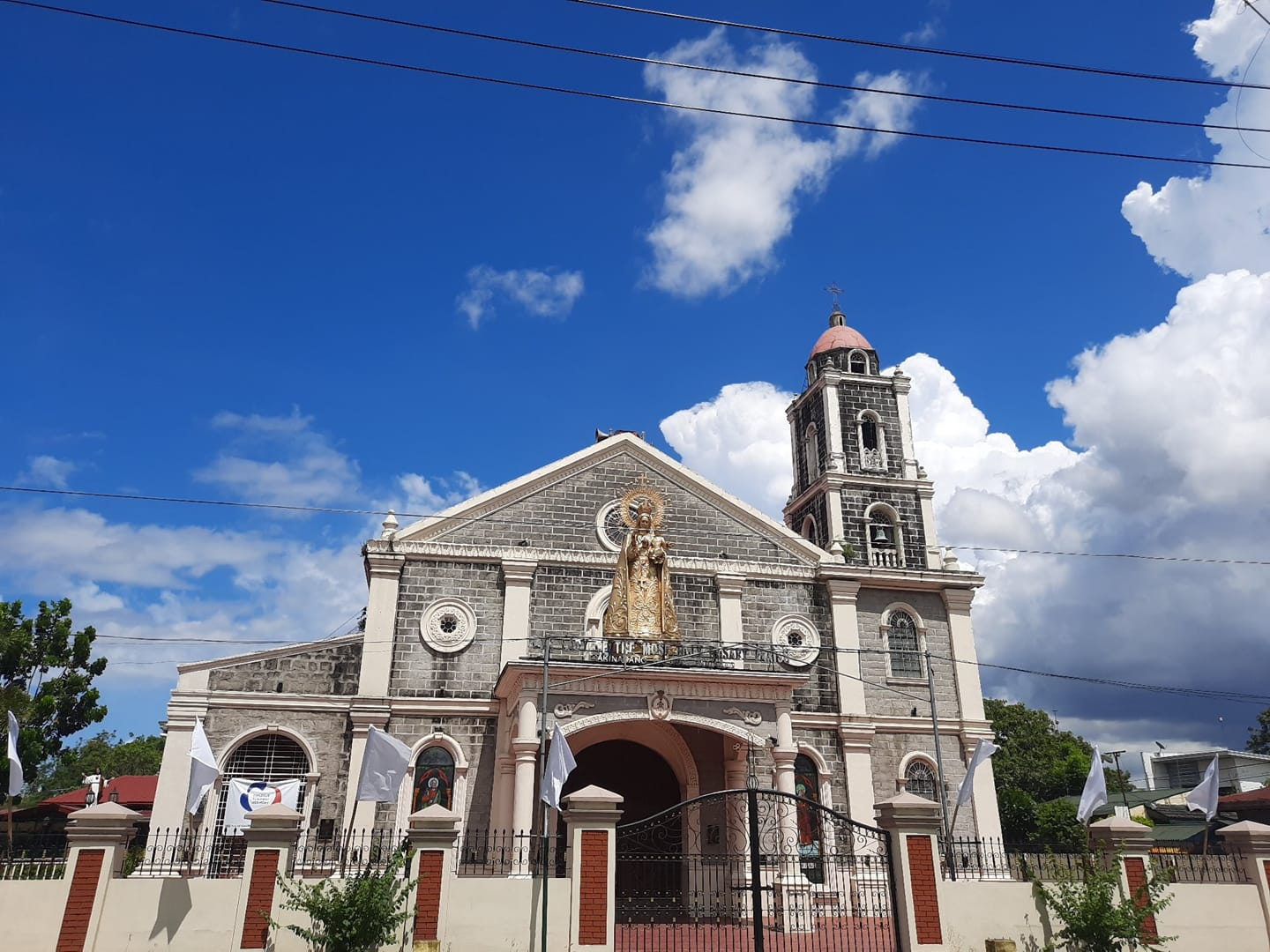
- Church facade in 2020

- Location in Bulacan Location in Luzon Location in the Philippines
- 14°55′7″N 120°53′10″E
- Location: Makinabang, Baliuag, Bulacan
- Country: Philippines
- Denomination: Roman Catholic

History
- Status: Parish church
- Dedicated: September 08, 2016

Architecture
- Functional status: Active
- Architectural type: Church building
- Groundbreaking: 1940
- Completed: 1981

Specifications
- Materials: Steel, mixed sand, gravel & cement

Administration
- Archdiocese: Manila
- Diocese: Malolos

Clergy
- Archbishop: Jose Advincula
- Bishop: Dennis Cabanada Villarojo
- Priest(s): Nicanor J. Castro, V.F.

Our Lady of Most Holy Rosary Parish Church, commonly known as Makinabang Church or Bisitang Pula, is a Roman Catholic Marian church in Barangay Makinabang, Baliuag, Bulacan, Philippines. It celebrates its Feast Day on October 7, it is one of six Roman Catholic parish churches in the municipality and is the focus of one of its largest processions each year. The other nearby Baliuag parishes which bound the church are: Saint Augustine Church (Población); Holy Family Parish (Tangos); Our Lady of Mount Carmel Parish (Sabang); Nuestra Señora de las Flores (V.D.F.); and Inmaculada Conception (Concepcion).

Makinabang Church is under the Vicariate of Saint Augustine of Hippo and belongs to the Roman Catholic Diocese of Malolos, a suffragan of the Archdiocese of Manila. Its incumbent team of priests in solidum moderator is parish priest Nicanor J. Castro, V.F., who was formally installed as the 6th Parish Priest on February 12, 2021. He succeeded the (Judicial Vicar), Winniefred F. Naboya, who was formally installed in November 2013. Naboya replaced the former Parish Administrator, Macario R. Manahan, who succeeded Walderedo Castillo who died in 2008. The Parish Church's Vicar Forane is its current Parish Priest, Nicanor J. Castro, V.F.

== Etymology ==
Before the 1521-1898 Spanish colonization of the Philippines, Makinabang was already a settlement or sitio and the largest in Baliuag. When the Spanish friars, particularly the Augustinians, founded Saint Augustine Church in 1733, a Spanish mestizo introduced a wood sugarcane press to the area. The machine extracted panutsa (molasses), which the villagers mixed in with their coffee and other foods. Natives called the press makina (from the Spanish maquina), at which they would queue and abáng (Tagalog, "wait"). Those queuing would enquire "Marami pa bang nakaabang?" ("Are there many more waiting?), from which the word Makina-bang and eventually Makinabang was formed.

The chapel and its fence were originally painted red, for which reason the parish was called Bisitang Pula ("red chapel").

== History ==
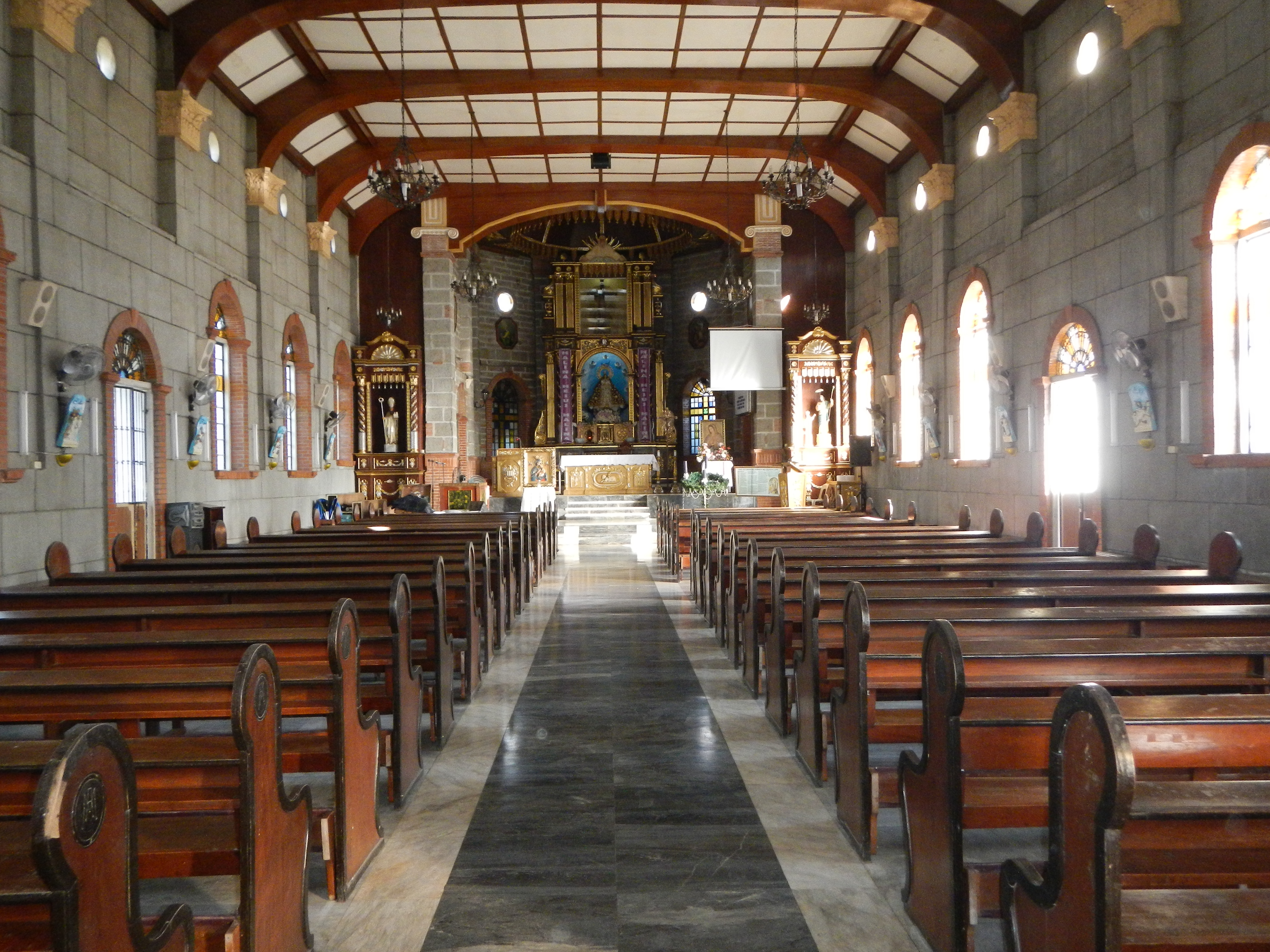
Church interior in 2012

The church was built in 1920 and established as Parish in 1941 with its patron Nuestra Señora del Santísimo Rosario (Our Lady of the Most Holy Rosary), a Marian title in relation to the Rosary. Devotion to the Virgin Mary under this title goes back to 1571 when Pope Pius V instituted "Our Lady of Victory" as an annual feast to commemorate the victory in the Battle of Lepanto. The victory was attributed to a rosary procession that day in St. Peter's Square in Rome for the success of the mission of the Holy League to hold back Muslim forces from overrunning Western Europe. In 1573, Pope Gregory XIII changed the title of this feast-day to "Feast of the Holy Rosary". in 1716 Pope Clement XI added the feast to the General Roman Calendar and assigned it to the first Sunday in October. Pope Pius X changed the date to October 7 in 1913, in his effort to restore celebration of the liturgy of the Sundays.

In 1920 the parish priests Pastor Luciano (d. 1985) suggested to Church authorities in Bulacan to build a small ermita or Kapilya. The new parish covered the Barangays of Tarcan, Santa Barbara, and even Taal and Santo Cristo in Pulilan, Bulacan. The small chapel is made of wood, nipa and light building materials, while its attached convento was made of nipa.

Jovito Reyes reconstructed the dilapidated chapel, adding concrete buttresses, including the walls, roof and convento. Wealthy residents, headed by Councilor Carmen Fernando García, Delfin Cruz and Salud S. Tesoro, helped build the new patio and grotto of the Sagrada Corazón and Our Lady of Lourdes.

Amador Wisco Cruz succeeded Jovito as parish priest on July 20, 1957. He bought the 4,000 sq.m. lot wherein the parishioners built the Parish Hall of the Cursillistas and Catholic Women's League. He is also known as the translator/editor of the most popular version of the Pasyón (Copyright 1949), the "Casaysayan nang Pasióng Mahal ni Jesucristong Panginoón Natin na Sucat Ipag-alab nang Pusò nang Sinomang Babasa". In the early 1990s, Expedito Caleon and Jess Cruz assisted the then ailing Amador, who died in 1992 after having served the parish for 35 years. Then came Ronald Ortega, Walderedo Castillo (d. 2008), and Macario R. Manahan (d. 2013).

In preparation for its 75th Jubilee in October 2016, the Pastoral Council initiated repairs and improvements on the church building and its environs, under Winniefred F. Naboya.

On February 12, 2021, Nicanor Castro was installed as the 6th parish priest.

== Pastors ==
No.	Portrait	Name	From	Until
1		Rev. Fr. Jovito F. Reyes† (22 Sep 1967)	1940; Assigned as Parish Administrator 1941; Appointed as Parish Priest	1957; Appointed as Parish Priest in San Bartolome Church (Malabon)
2		Rev. Fr. Amador W. Cruz† (28 Sep 1992)	1957; Appointed as Parish Priest	1992; Died in Office
-		Rev. Fr. Jesus Cruz† (25 Jun 2017)	1989; Assigned as Assistant Priests	1991; Appointed as Parish Priest in St. Gabriel the Archangel Quasi-Parish, San Gabriel, Santa Maria, Bulacan
-		Rev. Fr. Expedito Caleon	1989; Assigned as Assistant Priests	1991; Appointed as Assistant Priest in San Juan de Dios Church (San Rafael)
3		Rev. Fr. Ronaldo "Bogs" Ortega	1991; Assigned as Assistant Priest 1992; Appointed as Parish Priest	2003; Assigned as Parish Administrator at Nuestra Señora delas Flores Quasi Parish Virgen Delas Flores, Baliwag, Bulacan
4		Rev. Fr. Walderedo Castillo† (24 Sep 2008)	2003; Appointed as Parish Priest	2008; Died in Office
-		Rev. Msgr. Macario Manahan, P.C.† (16 Mar 2014)	2008; Assigned as Parish Administrator	2012; Retire as Active Priest
5		Rev. Fr. Winniefred F. Naboya, J.C.L.	2012; Assigned as Parish Administrator 2013; Appointed as Parish Priest	2021; Appointed as Parish Priest in Señora del Rosario Parish Pulonggubat, Guiguinto, Bulacan
6		Rev. Fr. Nicanor J. Castro, V.F.	2021; Appointed as Parish Priest	Incumbent

== Ordained Priest from Parish ==
No.	Name	From	Ordained
1	Rev. Fr. Reynaldo P. Fernando, Jr† (01 Dec 2022)	Taal, Pulilan	18 Jan 1979
2	Rev. Fr. Cennon Dennis G. Santos	Sta. Barbara, Baliuag	19 Nov 1988
3	Rev. Fr. Reynaldo Manahan	Taal, Pulilan	05 Sep 1995
4	Rev. Fr. Conrado “Larry” C. Zablan	Sta. Barbara, Baliuag	13 May 2000
5	Rev. Fr. Lamberto C. Tomas	Sta. Barbara, Baliuag	03 Sep 1994
6	Rev. Fr. Antero “Bong” C. Natividad	Sto. Cristo, Pulilan	14 Dec 1998
7	Rev. Fr. Anselmo M. Manalastas, O.S.B.	Tarcan, Baliuag	24 Nov 2002
8	Rev. Fr. Romualdo “Chi” C. Go	Sta. Barbara, Baliuag	31 May 2008
9	Rev. Fr. Reymann G. Catindig	Makinabang, Baliuag	28 May 2010
10	Rev. Fr. Laurence Anthony C. Bautista	Makinabang, Baliuag	10 Dec 2019
-	Rev. Patrick Jansen F. Tomas	Sta. Barbara, Baliuag	06 Dec 2021 (As Deacon)

== Chapels ==
Current chapels

- Bisita ni Sta. Barbara (Brgy. Santa Barbara, Baliwag City)
- Bisita ng Kamahal-mahalang Puso ni Hesus (Brgy. Tarcan, Baliwag City)
- Bisita ng Sagrado Corazon de Jesus (Sitio Mulawin Matanda, Brgy. Tarcan, Baliwag City)
- Bisita ni San Isidro Labrador (Sitio Mulawin Bata, Brgy. Tarcan, Baliwag City)
- Bisita ng Banal na Krus (Brgy. Sta. Barbara, Baliwag City)
- Bisita ni San Pio ng Pietrelcina (Vernieville Subdivision, Brgy. Sta. Barbara, Baliwag City)

Former chapels

- Bisita ng Mahal na Birhen ng Lourdes (Brgy. Taal, Pulilan)
- Parokya ng Pag-Akyat sa Langit ni Hesukristo (formerly known as Bisita ng Sto. Cristo) (Brgy. Sto. Cristo, Pulilan)
