= Battle of the Brains (Philippine game show) =

Philippine quiz show

- Genre: Quiz show
- Written by: Tisha Rosales
- Directed by: Jose Chito Cabatuando
- Presented by: David Celdran: Years 1 to 8 (1992-2000); Cathy Santillan, Anthony Suntay: Alternates, Year 1 to 8 (1992-2000); Chiqui Roa-Puno: Year 9 (2000-2001)
- Narrated by: Andy Santillan (1992-2001); Beng Chua (2001)
- Theme music composer: Yanni Chip Lewis / Middle "C" Productions
- Opening theme: Santorini
- Country of origin: Philippines
- Original languages: English; Filipino
- No. of episodes: 460+?

Production
- Executive producers: Theresa Reyes Alvarez; Tonnette Reyes
- Production locations: Broadcast City, Quezon City: Year 1 to 8 (1992-2000); PTV 4 Broadcast Complex, Quezon City: Year 9 (2000-2001)
- Camera setup: Multiple-camera setup
- Running time: 90 minutes: Year 1 to 8 (1992-2000); 60 minutes: Year 9 (2000-2001)
- Production companies: Focal Media Arts, Inc.; RPN Entertainment Group (1992-2001); Uniwide Sales, Inc. (1992-1999); AMA Computer College (1999-2001)

Original release
- Network: RPN 9; (1992–2001: Years 1-8); NBN 4; (2001: Year 9)
- Release: July 18, 1992 – July 14, 2001

Battle of the Brains was a Philippine television quiz show broadcast by New Vision 9/RPN and PTV. Originally hosted by David Celdran, it aired on New Vision 9/RPN from July 18, 1992, to 2001. The show moved to PTV from 2001 to July 14, 2001. The show aired on an afternoon and later noon time slot, from 1:30 PM to 3:00 PM (1992–1997), 12:00 PM to 1:30 PM (1997–2000), and 12:00 PM to 1:00 PM (2001), every Saturday. Chiqui Roa-Puno served as the host of the final year (Year 9). Considered as one of the most culturally influential locally produced shows of the 1990s, the annual grand championship of Battle of the Brains was open to all elementary, high school and college students nationwide, while a short-lived Mindmaster segment (1995–1997) was open to adults. It was primarily sponsored by Uniwide Sales, Inc.—a major budget retailer of that time—from Years 1 (1992–1993) to 7 (1998–1999). It was then sponsored by AMA Computer College from Years 8 (1999–2000) to 9 (2000–2001).

== Hosts ==
=== Main hosts ===
- David Celdran: Year 1 to Year 8 (1992–2000)
- Chiqui Roa-Puno: Year 9 (2000–2001)

=== Alternate hosts ===
- Cathy Santillan: Year 1 to Year 8 (1992–2000)
- Anthony Suntay: Year 1 to Year 8 (1992–2000)

== Tournament format ==
- Competitors usually joined by contacting Focal Media Arts by telephone, and were directly slotted for the televised Weekly Finals. But sometimes, the show ventured out to remote schools and provinces to host non-televised rounds, which served as a gateway to joining the Weekly Finals.
- Each year determined its elementary, high school, and college level Grand Champions in a single-elimination tournament with four rounds (called the Weekly, Monthly, Quarterly, and Grand Finals). Only the top competitor advanced to the next round.
- The Weekly, Quarterly, and Grand Finals featured 3 competing schools each, while the Monthly Finals had 4 competing schools
- Each competing elementary and high school is represented by 2 students (except for elementary teams from Years 1 and 2, which fielded 3 students each). The college competition featured an individual representing the school, except from Year 8 onwards, when 2-person teams were adopted.
- Alternates were allowed for elementary and high school competitors. But once used in competition, the alternate had to continue to compete, taking the displaced student's place, for the rest of the competition.
- In Year 9, the elementary and high school Grand Championships were scrapped. The format for the college level was changed to the returning-champion format similar to that of Jeopardy!. The winner returned on the next episode to face a new set of challengers until they themselves got defeated.
- The Mindmaster portion featured only 2 competing individuals per episode, and was set up in the returning-champion format

== Episode format ==
- A panel of judges was present at every round, whose members were usually professors from top Philippine universities. Their primary function is to oversee and settle any disputes or complaints. Some of the competition's judges were:

Name of judge	Affiliation/s	Subject expertise	Years active
Milagros Ibe	University of the Philippines Diliman	Mathematics	1992-1999?
Ma. Assunta Caoile-Cuyegkeng	Ateneo de Manila University	Chemistry	1992-?
Manuel Dy Jr.	Ateneo de Manila University	Philosophy, Arts, and Culture	1992-1999?
Marcelino Foronda	De La Salle University, Panorama magazine	History	1992-?
Oscar Evangelista	University of the Philippines Diliman, National Historical Commission of the Philippines	History	1997?-?
Lou Bolinao	University of the Philippines Diliman	History	1994-?
Rechilda Villame	Mathematics Teachers Association of the Philippines	Mathematics	?-?
Doris Montecastro	Ateneo de Manila University	Chemistry	1994-1999
Francis Ted Limpoco	Ateneo de Manila University	Science	1998–2000
John Bulaong	Ateneo de Manila University	Arts and Culture	?-?
Jaime Veneracion	University of the Philippines Diliman	History	1994?-?
Moises Asuncion	University of the Philippines Diliman	Mathematics	1994?-?
Sergio Cao	University of the Philippines Diliman	Mathematics	1994?-?
Tony Ferrer	Ateneo de Manila University	English	1994?-?
Erwin Enriquez	Ateneo de Manila University	Chemistry	1994?-?
Angelli Tugado	Ateneo de Manila University	Philosophy	1994?-?
Armand Guidote	Ateneo de Manila University	Chemistry	1994?-?
Noelle Rodriguez	Ateneo de Manila University	History	1994?-?

Mechanics for elimination rounds prior to Grand Finals, Year 3 onwards:

- Competition in each level was composed of 30 questions in total, grouped into two rounds (Easy and Difficult) of 15 questions each. Each round involved an equal number of questions asked in five subject areas: Science, Mathematics, History, General Information, and Arts/Literature.
- The host read the question twice, and was given some freedom to paraphrase the question. Contestants could answer as soon as the question was first read.
- Contestants answered by buzzing in first, which when performed was accompanied by a unique light and sound display. The rostra were rigged with a lockout buzzing system: contestants buzzing in late would not generate the light and sound display. After buzzing, the host acknowledged the school and were given five seconds to answer correctly. If not, they forfeit the question and the other teams are given the chance to answer, subject to the same time constraints. For each question given, a team may only attempt to answer once. All contestants were given a chance to answer.
- If no contestant attempts to buzz within five seconds (or within 30 seconds for math questions) after a question has been asked, the host announces the correct answer.
- Points allotted for each question have varied, but generally the harder-category questions carry more points.
- At the end of each round, the host recaps the scores and announces round leaders or winners.
- In case of a tie for the winner, sudden-death questions were asked. The first team to answer correctly became the winner.
- The winner of each round prior to the Grand Finals had the opportunity to answer ten bonus questions (selected from three subject categories which vary by episode) within one minute and earn PHP 600 for each correct answer. From Year 7 onwards, the bonus round involved a three-ring pattern board, and a final bonus question consisting of a jumbled word with clue, and is worth PHP 2,000 if answered correctly.

Difference in mechanics for elimination rounds prior to Grand Finals, Years 1-2:

- Three students per team in the elementary round, reduced to two students in Year 3 but with total prizes unchanged.
- Same 30 questions in total, but grouped into easy, average and difficult rounds of ten questions each.
- For each question, only two competing teams out of four are given the chance to answer. To prevent two contestants blocking the chances of the remaining two contestants, a score penalty is imposed in the difficult round for the second and subsequent wrong answers made. This penalty is waived after Year 2 as all contestants get a chance to answer.

Mechanics for the Grand Finals and the ASEAN Invitational were modified as follows:

- Written-answer format with correct spelling required, and with no buzzers involved so all contestants can simultaneously score on each question.
- No more bonus round after the winner is announced.
- Still 30 questions in total, grouped in the same manner as in the eliminations, equally weighted in the 5 subject areas mentioned above, and with sudden-death questions employed in case of a tie for the winner.
- The competition also has a list of reference books which are used in settling disputes. Since Year 7, some of those books became part of the Grand Prize.

In the three-ring pattern board, the contestant chooses one of three concentric rings to accomplish, with the questions in each ring having a common theme (such as all answers beginning with the same letter, or of people from a particular field). Rings with more questions are found at the outermost portion of the set, and are generally easier to answer per question, while rings with fewer questions are at the center of the set but are usually more difficult. Each question adds points to the total, while completing a ring merits extra prizes from show sponsors.

- Complaints against questions, which could lead to score changes, were allowed during the actual taping of the show and were resolved with the decision of a panel of judges. But the actual protestations were not shown on air: the host simply summarized the complaint and explained the score change.

== Eligibility rules ==
- Any school recognized by the Philippine Department of Education, Culture, and Sports (DECS; now known as DepEd) was eligible to compete. It must have fielded students who were enrolled at the school at the designated level at the time the year started. It is unknown whether Philippine schools abroad which were recognized by DECS were technically eligible.
- For the elementary and high school levels, one alternate could be designated who will participate for the duration of the tournament once they are activated.
- For the elementary and high school levels, a school could be represented only once during the entire tournament. At the college level, a school may be represented as often as possible, provided it had not yet reached the Grand Finals. Once a competitor from a school makes the Grand Finals, other contestants from the same school would not be allowed to compete.
- As is common in televised academic quiz formats in the Philippines, which promote the 'give-chance-to-others' concept, an individual could become Grand Champion only once per level. This means that, for example, a person winning the elementary Grand Championship twice was not allowed. But a person winning one high school and one college Grand Championship is (which in fact was achieved separately by two individuals).

== Venues ==
All rounds prior to the Grand Finals were recorded in Broadcast City, Quezon City. However, the Grand Finals were usually held at different venues, including the following:

Show year	Years or date	Grand Finals venue
1	1992–1993	Philippine International Convention Center, Pasay
2	1993–1994	Philippine International Convention Center, Pasay
3	1994–1995	Philippine International Convention Center, Pasay
4	1995–1996	Philippine International Convention Center, Pasay
5	1996–1997	Philippine International Convention Center, Pasay
ASEAN Invitational	1997-08-08	Philippine International Convention Center, Pasay
6	1997–1998	Philippine International Convention Center, Pasay
7	1998–1999	Teatro Aguinaldo, Camp Aguinaldo, Quezon City
8	1999–2000	Broadcast City, Quezon City
9	2000–2001	Due to the change in competition format, no Grand Finals event was held

== Prizes ==
For all rounds prior to the Grand Finals, points earned were paid out in Philippine peso for all contestants.

From Years 1 to 6, Grand Champions were awarded the following (in units of Philippine pesos, before 20% tax on prizes):

Level	Student/s	School	Coach	Total
Elementary	300,000	100,000	100,000	500,000
High School	400,000	100,000	100,000	600,000
College	500,000	0^{*}	0^{*}	500,000

* - No coaches are formally recognized or awarded. Schools are recognized but are not given a separate prize. However, in reality, certain college competitors are given support or formal recognition by coaches and school officials.

In Years 7 and 8, the Grand Finals total prize for each level was PHP 500,000 (combination of cash and in kind (household appliances, encyclopedia sets and other books, and travel packages to destinations within the Philippines). The travel destination for the students may be different from that of the coaches (except again for College Level, which has no awards for school or coach)).

From Years 1 through 7, all Grand Finalists were awarded plaques prior to taping, with the eventual Grand Champion getting another trophy at the conclusion of the Grand Finals. On Year 8, certificates were given for each round win prior to the Grand Finals, and a Grand Champion trophy was given at the conclusion of the Grand Finals.

== Special editions/portions ==
- Prior to the start of the elementary, high school, and college tournaments, the show sometimes aired Celebrity Edition episodes, where competitors were each composed of a television personality (usually female) and a college-level contestant (usually male). It could be observed during parts of the Celebrity Edition that the college contestant presses the buzzer and whispers the answer to the celebrity, who in turns provides the response to the host. Famous Filipinos such as Subas Herrero, Pinky Marquez, Victoria, Teresa Loyzaga, and Audie Gemora have appeared in the Celebrity Edition, which was not part of any tournament format.
- In 1994, during the broadcast lull between Years 2 and 3, the producers of Battle of the Brains held an exhibition contest between three teams of past champions from Student Canteen's IQ7 and 1 team from Battle of the Brains. David Celdran served as host.
  - The IQ7 teams were:
    - Jose Ramon Lorenzo and Butch Maniego (TV sports commentator)
    - Pete Dadula (former Makati councilor and quiz coach) and Nasser Abbas
    - Dave Oriel and Gil Manimbo (director of Magandang Gabi... Bayan)
  - The lone Battle of the Brains team was represented by Year 2 Grand Finalists Giovanni Claveria and Oliver Tungol
  - The Battle of the Brains team won the exhibition, taking home PHP 16,000. The Lorenzo-Maniego IQ7 team took 2nd place.
- From 1995 to 1997, a Mindmaster portion was added to the program, in which college graduates and professionals (some of whom have previously competed as students) compete as individuals in a two-competitor, returning-champion format. Only those who pass a written test were given a chance to join the competition. The winner got to compete in the next episode until they are defeated. If a competitor is able to win for six consecutive weeks, they have the option to either (1) get a showcase prize by answering correctly a bonus question and return the following week, or (2) refuse to answer the bonus question but still come back the following week to defend the title. If a winner gave a wrong answer to the bonus question, they will lose both the showcase prize and the opportunity to defend the title. Leonardo Gapol (Year 1 College Grand Finalist 3rd place) was well known for winning 13 consecutive matches before being offered to retire.
- In 1997, in celebration of the 30th anniversary of ASEAN, an ASEAN Invitational Battle of the Brains was aired on RPN 9, pitting the Year 5 Grand Champions against students from Indonesia, Singapore, Vietnam, Malaysia, and Thailand. The Philippine champions won at all levels.

== Grand Champions and Finalists ==
Year number	Dates covered	Elementary Grand Champion	2nd and 3rd Elementary Grand Finalists	High School Grand Champion	2nd and 3rd High School Grand Finalists	College Grand Champion	2nd and 3rd College Grand Finalists
1	1992–1993	Georgie Anne Liad; Aimee Marie Alcera; Javier Gil Montemayor; Aurora Aragon Quezon Elementary School, Manila	Jay Kim Del Mundo; George Ongkeko Jr. Carlo Lopez; St. John's Academy, San Juan, Metro Manila Jerome Senen; Eugene Cunanan; Harold John Santos; Notre Dame of Greater Manila, Caloocan	Novito Magsino; Froilan Mendoza; Pasig Catholic College	Christian Vasquez; Christopher Quilalang; Roosevelt College, Marikina Leila Castañeda; Allan Carlos Hizon; De La Salle Santiago Zobel School, Muntinlupa	Ferdinand Makalinao; 1st Year Integrated Liberal Arts and Medicine (INTARMED); University of the Philippines Manila	Orion Perez Dumdum; 2nd Year B.S. Computer Science; Ateneo de Manila University, Quezon City Leonardo Gapol; 2nd Year B.S. Nursing; Pamantansan ng Lungsod ng Maynila, Manila
2	1993–1994	John Paul Bayhon; Patrick Libranda; Faith Victory Mejor; Colegio San Agustin, Biñan, Laguna	? ? ? ? ? ?	Garry Ng; Rommel Go; St. Stephen's High School, Manila	Bernard Chan; Allan Yu; Grace Christian High School, Quezon City ? ? St Mary's Academy (now St. Mary's College of Baliuag), Baliuag, Bulacan	Alfonso Gonzales III; 1st Year B.S. Applied Mathematics; University of the Philippines Los Baños, Laguna	Oliver Tungol; 4th Year B.S. Electronics and Communications Engineering; Polytechnic University of the Philippines Sta. Mesa, Manila Giovanni Archibal Claveria; 3rd Year B.S. Electronics and Communications Engineering; Don Bosco Technical School (now Don Bosco Technical College), Mandaluyong
3	1994–1995	Germaine Lisa Ang; Ellyson Ting; Philippine Academy of Sakya, Manila	? ? ? ? ? ?	Paulo David Javier; Joseph Joemer Perez; San Jose Academy, Navotas	? ? ? ? ? ?	Richard Pante; 5th Year B.S. Electronics and Communications Engineering; Polytechnic University of the Philippines Sta. Mesa, Manila	Jessie Antonio ?th Year ? Technological Institute of the Philippines Manila Christian Vasquez; 2nd? Year ? University of the Philippines Manila
4	1995–1996	Ma. Ailil Alvarez; Rosemarie Amodia; St. Paul College of Parañaque	Christian Paolo Pestelos; Edward Jay Salao; La Consolacion College - Caloocan ? ? ?	Mel Anthony Cruz; Jasper Hendrick Cheng; Chiang Kai Shek College, Manila	Andrie Jeremy Formanez; Bobit Gaviola; Cebu City National Science High School ? ? ?	Jose Rizal Coteng; 4th Year B.S. Physical Therapy; University of Santo Tomas, Manila	? ?th Year ? ? Emmanuel Simbulan ?th Year ? Polytechnic University of the Philippines Sta. Mesa, Manila
5	1996–1997	Mark Anthony Salud; Anthony Jefferson Atienza; Holy Rosary Academy, Sta. Rosa, Laguna	Sir Martin Cortez; Jerome Canlas; Notre Dame of Greater Manila, Caloocan Melina Mel Moran; Christina Anne Hernandez; San Geronimo Emiliani School, San Pedro, Laguna	Marie Grace Mappala; Ron Emil Castro; Bloomfield Academy (now Bloomfield Academy Center for Science and Technology), Las Piñas	Allen Perez; Jonil Julian Bautista; St. Mary's Academy, Baliuag Sharon Lyn Jalac; Alexis Ryan Razon; Rizal High School, Pasig	Pierre Cantillero; 4th? Year B.S. Industrial Psychology; Polytechnic University of the Philippines Sta. Mesa, Manila	Joebert Ramos ?th Year ? University of the Philippines Diliman, Quezon City Edric Andrey Cruz; 4th Year B.S. Foreign Service; Lyceum of the Philippines
ASEAN Invitational	1997-08-08	Mark Anthony Salud; Anthony Jefferson Atienza; Holy Rosary Academy, Sta. Rosa, Laguna	Theodric Lee Jun; Pates John Richard Pau Yi ?, Singapore Nguyen Thu Tang; Nguyen Linh Dan ?, Vietnam Bhawin Sirithanaratanakul; Karan Bhuripanyo ?, Thailand	Marie Grace Mappala; Ron Emil Castro; Bloomfield Academy (now Bloomfield Academy Center for Science and Technology), Las Piñas	Lila Kurniasari; Mellisa Efiyanti ?, Indonesia Natalie Koh Si Fa; Hong En Ping ?, Singapore Nguyen Thi Thanh Thao; Ho Huong Giang ?, Vietnam Chomppunut Asava-Aree; Suchanan Tambunlertchai ?, Thailand	Pierre Cantillero; 4th? Year B.S. Industrial Psychology; Polytechnic University of the Philippines Sta. Mesa, Manila	Alfred Pang Kah Meng ?, Singapore Le Xuan Thang or Dang Cam Tu ?, Vietnam Wan Azrin Izani bin Wan Mohamad Zin or Rafidah bt Mohammad ?, Malaysia Sutayut Osornprasop ?, Thailand
6	1997–1998	? ? La Salle Green Hills, San Juan, Metro Manila	? ? ? Philip Kimpo Jr. Juan Paolo Samontañez; Lourdes School of Quezon City	Jose Roi Avena; Rogaciano Pasion III; Claret School of Quezon City	Mark Noel Mabanglo; Jayson Arvin Salazar; Makati Science High School, Makati ? ? ?	Joseph Joemer Perez; 3rd Year B.A. Political Science; University of the Philippines Diliman, Quezon City	Marcelino S. Javier Jr. ?th Year B.S. Electronics and Communications Engineering; Computronix College, Dagupan, Pangasinan Jonil Julian Bautista; 1st Year B.S. Economics; Ateneo de Manila University
7	1998–1999	Joseph Michael Vitug; Victor Joel Ayson; Lourdes School of Quezon City	Cherry Ignacio; Renelson Alvarez; Divine Light Academy, Las Piñas City Patricia Rimando; Rashell Cabrera; St. Scholastica's Academy, Marikina	Patrick Gerard de Guzman; Neil Tristan Yabut; Manila Science High School	Anthony Belmonte; Emmanuel Vargas; The Sisters of Mary School (Adlas Campus), Silang, Cavite Samuel Verzosa Jr. Michael Gerald Dealino; Angelicum College, Quezon City	Ronald Bautista ?th Year B.S. Electronics and Communications Engineering; Computronix College, Dagupan, Pangasinan	Almario Roxas; 4th Year B.A. Political Science; University of the Philippines Diliman, Quezon City Lingwi Valguna; 5th Year B.S. Civil Engineering; Polytechnic University of the Philippines Sta. Mesa, Manila
8	1999–2000	? ? ?	Bernard Vic Mendoza ? Ateneo de Manila Grade School ? ? ?	Wiko Kabiling; David Dy; La Salle Green Hills, San Juan, Metro Manila	? ? ? ? ? ?	Neil Tristan Yabut; 1st Year B.S. Molecular Biology and Biotechnology; Stanley Kristoffer Cabrera VI; 1st Year B.S. Business Administration and Accountancy; University of the Philippines Diliman, Quezon City	Christopher E. Lopez ?th Year ? Rey Reyes Jr. ?th Year ? Polytechnic University of the Philippines Sta. Mesa, Manila Christian Anthony Reyes; 4th Year B.S. Electronics and Communications Engineering; Francis Rino Alegado ?th Year ? University of Santo Tomas, Manila
9	2000–2001*	None	None	None	None	None	Roy Ragutana ?th Year B.S. Industrial Engineering; Rossbert Chua ?th Year B.S. Mathematics; Polytechnic University of the Philippines Sta. Mesa, Manila (undefeated for 10 consecutive episodes until show's cancellation)

* - A change to the returning-champion format meant that there was no overall champion at the end of the year.

== Mindmaster Champions ==
Calendar year or dates	Consecutive weeks	Contestant
1996	10	Kenneth Plamenco
1996	13	Leonardo Gapol
1997-10-?	?	Richie Velasquez
1997	2	Jose (Bong) Cruz Jr.
1998?<mindmaster was only until 1997>	2	Ian Ceasar Vicente

== Records and notable events ==
=== Most Grand Championships ===
School

School	Number of Grand Championships	Breakdown (including campus)
University of the Philippines	4	Year 1 (1993): College, Manila; Year 2 (1994): College, Los Baños; Year 6 (1998): College, Diliman; Year 8 (2000): College, Diliman
Polytechnic University of the Philippines	2	Year 3 (1995): College, Sta. Mesa; Year 5 (1997): College, Sta. Mesa
De La Salle Philippines	2	Year 6 (1998): Elementary, as La Salle Green Hills; Year 8 (2000): High School, as La Salle Green Hills

Individual

Name	Number of Grand Championships	Breakdown
Joseph Joemer Perez	2	Year 3 (1995): High School, San Jose Academy, Navotas; Year 6 (1998): College, University of the Philippines Diliman
Neil Tristan Yabut	2	Year 7 (1999): High School, Manila Science High School; Year 8 (2000): College, University of the Philippines Diliman

At different levels

School or person	Number of levels with Grand Championships	Total number of Grand Championships	Breakdown
Joseph Joemer Perez	2	2	Elementary: None; High School: Year 3 (1995); College: Year 6 (1998)
De La Salle Philippines	2	2	Elementary: Year 6 (1998), as La Salle Green Hills; High School, Year 8 (2000), as La Salle Green Hills; College: None
Neil Tristan Yabut	2	2	Elementary: None; High School: Year 7 (1999); College: Year 8 (2000)

In consecutive years

School or person	Number of consecutive Grand Championships	Breakdown
Neil Tristan Yabut	2	Year 7 (1999): High School, Manila Science High School; Year 8 (2000): College, University of the Philippines Diliman

=== Youngest Grand Champions respective to year level ===
Name	Show year	School level of Grand Championship	Year level within course	Length of course (years)
Ferdinand Makalinao	1	College	1 (rookie)	7
Alfonso Gonzales III	2	College	1 (rookie)	4
Stanley Kristoffer Cabrera VI	8	College	1 (rookie)	5
Neil Tristan Yabut	8	College	1 (rookie)	4

All attended campuses of the University of the Philippines System.

=== Most Grand Finals appearances ===
Years in bold denote Grand Championship

School (and Campus)

School	Number of Grand Finals appearances	Breakdown (including campus)
University of the Philippines	7	Year 1 (1993): College, Manila; Year 2 (1994): College, Los Baños; Year 3 (1995): College, Manila; Year 5 (1997): College, Diliman; Year 6 (1998): College, Diliman; Year 7 (1999): College, Diliman; Year 8 (2000): College, Diliman
Polytechnic University of the Philippines	6	Year 2 (1994): College, Sta. Mesa; Year 3 (1995): College, Sta. Mesa; Year 4 (1996): College, Sta. Mesa; Year 5 (1997): College, Sta. Mesa; Year 7 (1999): College, Sta. Mesa; Year 8 (2000): College, Sta. Mesa
De La Salle Philippines	3	Year 1 (1993): High School, as De La Salle Santiago Zobel School; Year 6 (1998): Elementary, as La Salle Green Hills; Year 8 (2000): High School, as La Salle Green Hills
Ateneo de Manila	3	Year 1 (1993): College, Loyola Heights (as Ateneo de Manila University); Year 6 (1998): College, Loyola Heights (as Ateneo de Manila University); Year 8 (2000): Elementary, Loyola Heights (as Ateneo Grade School)
Notre Dame of Greater Manila	2	Year 1 (1993): Elementary; Year 5 (1997): Elementary
St Mary's Academy	2	Year 2 (1994): High School; Year 5 (1997): High School
Lourdes School of Quezon City	2	Year 6 (1998): Elementary; Year 7 (1999): Elementary
Computronix College	2	Year 6 (1998): College; Year 7 (1999): College
University of Santo Tomas*	2	Year 4 (1996): College, Manila; Year 8 (2000): College, Manila

- - Angelicum College reached the Grand Finals in Year 7 (1999), but was not yet part of the UST System until 2017.

Individual

Name	Number of Grand Finals appearances	Breakdown
Christian Vasquez	2	Year 1 (1993), High School; Year 3 (1995), College
Joseph Joemer Perez	2	**Year 3 (1995)**, High School; **Year 6 (1998)**, College
Jonil Julian Bautista	2	Year 5 (1997), High School; Year 6 (1998), College
Neil Tristan Yabut	2	**Year 7 (1999)**, High School; **Year 8 (2000)**, College

At different levels

School or person	Number of levels with Grand Finals appearances	Total number of Grand Finals appearances	Breakdown (including campus)
De La Salle Philippines	2	3	Elementary: **Year 6 (1998)**, as La Salle Green Hills; High School: Year 1 (1993), as De La Salle Santiago Zobel School; and **Year 8 (2000)**, as La Salle Green Hills; College: None
Ateneo de Manila	2	3	Elementary: Year 8 (2000), as Ateneo Grade School; High School: None; College: Year 1 (1993) and Year 6 (1998), as Ateneo de Manila University
Christian Vasquez	2	2	Elementary: None; High School: Year 1 (1993); College: Year 3 (1995)
Joseph Joemer Perez	2	2	Elementary: None; High School: **Year 3 (1995)**; College: **Year 6 (1998)**
Jonil Julian Bautista	2	2	Elementary: None; High School: Year 5 (1997); College: Year 6 (1998)
Neil Tristan Yabut	2	2	Elementary: None; High School: **Year 7 (1999)**; College: **Year 8 (2000)**

In consecutive years

School or person	Number of consecutive Grand Finals appearances	Breakdown (including campus)
Polytechnic University of the Philippines	4	Year 2 (1994): College, Sta. Mesa; Year 3 (1995): College, Sta. Mesa; Year 4 (1996): College, Sta. Mesa; Year 5 (1997): College, Sta. Mesa
University of the Philippines	4	Year 5 (1997): College, Diliman; Year 6 (1998): College, Diliman; Year 7 (1999): College, Diliman; Year 8 (2000): College, Diliman
Jonil Julian Bautista	2	Year 5 (1997), High School; Year 6 (1998), College
Lourdes School of Quezon City	2	Year 6 (1998): Elementary; Year 7 (1999): Elementary
Computronix College	2	Year 6 (1998): College; Year 7 (1999): College
Neil Tristan Yabut	2	**Year 7 (1999)**, High School; **Year 8 (2000)**, College

=== Most points ===
In 1 episode

School	Show year	Total points	Level	Taping date
Manila Science High School	7	11,000	Weekly Finals	1999-05-22
Manila Science High School	7	10,700	Monthly Finals	1999-05-29
Polytechnic University of the Philippines - Sta. Mesa (Percival Biadora)	7	10,400	Weekly Finals	1998-?
Lourdes School of Quezon City	7	10,350	Monthly Finals	1998-11-28
University of the Philippines - Diliman (Jun Prosini Anave)	7	10,100	Weekly Finals	1998-11-21
Manila Science High School	7	10,000	Quarterly Finals	1999-06-05
Ateneo de Manila University (Orion Perez Dumdum)	1	9,900	Weekly Finals	1992-11-?
Polytechnic University of the Philippines Sta. Mesa (Oliver Tungol)	2	9,000	Quarterly Finals	1994?

In 1 year

School	Show year	Total points	Number of Perfect Bonus Rounds	Breakdown
Manila Science High School*	7	40,500	3	11,000 (Weekly Finals); 10,700 (Monthly Finals); 10,000 (Quarterly Finals); 8,800 (Grand Finals)
Sisters of Mary School - Adlas	7	26,900	1	6,900 (Weekly Finals); 8,600 (Monthly Finals); 7,300 (Quarterly Finals); 4,100 (Grand Finals)

* - During this scoring run, Manila Science perfected all 3 of their bonus rounds, and exceeded the combined score (4,100 + 3,100) of their rivals in the Grand Finals.

=== Match record (Annual Grand Championship only) ===
School and Campus*

Name	Number of years joined	Total matches	Win-Loss	Win %	Breakdown
La Salle Green Hills	2?	8?	8?-0?	100?	Year 6 Elementary Grand Champion (4–0); others?; Year 8 High School Grand Champion (4–0)
University of the Philippines Manila**	2?	8?	7?-1?	88?	Year 1 College Grand Champion (4–0); Year 3 College Grand Finalist (3–1); others?
Lourdes School of Quezon City	2?	8?	7?-1?	88?	Year 6 Elementary Grand Finalist (3–1); Year 7 Elementary Grand Champion (4–0); others?
Computronix College**	2?	8?	7?-1?	88?	Year 6 College Grand Finalist (3–1); Year 7 College Grand Champion (4–0); others?
University of Santo Tomas**	8?	8?	7?-1?	88?	Year 4 College Grand Champion (4–0); Year 8 College Grand Finalist (3–1); others?
University of the Philippines Diliman**	8?	17?	14?-3?	82?	others?; Year 5 College Grand Finalist (3–1); Year 6 College Grand Champion (4–0); Year 7 College Grand Finalist (3–1); Year 8 College Grand Champion (4–0)
Polytechnic University of the Philippines Sta. Mesa**	8	25?	20?-6?	77?	Year 1 College Weekly Finalist (0–1); Year 2 College Grand Finalist (3–1); Year 3 College Grand Champion (4–0); Year 4 College Grand Finalist (3–1); Year 5 College Grand Champion (4–0); Year 6 College ? Finalist (?-1?); Year 7 College Grand Finalist (3–1); Year 8 College Grand Finalist (3–1)
Notre Dame of Greater Manila	2?	8?	6?-2?	75?	Year 1 Elementary Grand Finalist (3–1); Year 5 Elementary Grand Finalist (3–1); others?
St Mary's Academy	2?	8?	6?-2?	75?	Year 2 High School Grand Finalist (3–1); Year 5 High School Grand Finalist (3–1); others?
Manila Science High School	3	8?	6?-2	75?	Year 1 High School ? Finalist (?-1); Year 2 High School Quarterly Finalist (2–1); Year 7 High School Grand Champion (4–0)
Ateneo de Manila University**	8?	10?	7?-3?	70?	Year 1 College Grand Finalist (3–1); Year 2 College Monthly Finalist (1-1); Year 6 College Grand Finalist (3–1); others?
Grace Christian High School	8?	9?	6?-3?	67?	Year 2 High School Grand Finalist (3–1); Year 4 Elementary Monthly? Finalist (1?-1); others?; Year 7 High School Quarterly Finalist (2-1)
Casa del Niño Science High School	8?	9?	4?-2?	67?	Year 4 High School Quarterly Finalist (2-1); others?; Year 7 High School Quarterly Finalist (2-1)

* - Campuses have to be separated to maximize fairness in number of years joined and win-loss record
** - Win-loss records shown for colleges are from the individual or team that made it furthest during the year. In a year, multiple entries from the same college are allowed to join until one of them wins the Quarterly Finals

Individual (Including matches attained with partners)

Name	Number of years joined	Total matches	Win-Loss	Win %	Breakdown
Neil Tristan Yabut	2	8	8-0	100	Year 7 High School Grand Champion (4–0)*; Year 8 College Grand Champion (4–0)*
Joseph Joemer Perez	2?	8?	8?-0?	100?	Year 3 High School Grand Champion (4–0)*; others?; Year 6 College Grand Champion (4–0)
Germaine Lisa Ang	2?	7?	6?-1?	86?	Year 3 Elementary Grand Champion (4–0)*; Year 7 High School Quarterly Finalist (2–1)*; others?
Ellyson Ting	2?	7?	6?-1?	86?	Year 3 Elementary Grand Champion (4–0)*; Year 7 High School Quarterly Finalist (2–1)*; others?
Jonil Julian Bautista	2	8	6-2	75	Year 5 High School Grand Finalist (3–1)*; Year 6 College Grand Finalist (3–1)
Christian Vasquez	2?	8?	6?-2?	75?	Year 1 High School Grand Finalist (3–1)*; others?; Year 3 College Grand Finalist (3–1)
Richard Pante	3	7?	5?-2	71?	Year 1 College Weekly Finalist (0–1); Year 2 College Monthly? Finalist (1?-1); Year 3 College Grand Champion (4–0)
Giovanni Archibal Claveria	2?	7?	5?-2?	71?	Year 2 College Grand Finalist (3–1); Year 3 College Quarterly Finalist (2–1); others?
Leonardo Gapol	4	13	9-4	69	Year 1 College Grand Finalist (3–1); Year 2 College Quarterly Finalist (2–1); Year 3 College Quarterly Finalist (2–1); Year 4 College Quarterly Finalist (2–1)
Eduardo Banzuela	2?	6?	4?-2?	67?	Year 1 College Quarterly Finalist (2–1); Year 2 College Quarterly Finalist (2–1); others?
Orion Perez Dumdum	2?	6?	4?-2?	67?	Year 1 College Grand Finalist (3–1); Year 2 College Monthly Finalist (1-1); others?
Joselito Nilo Cruz	2?	6?	4?-2?	67?	Year 3 College Quarterly Finalist (2–1); Year 4 College Quarterly Finalist (2–1); others?
Pierre Cantillero	4?	8?	5?-3	63?	Year 1?; Year 2 College Monthly Finalist (1-1); Year 3 College ? Finalist (?-1); Year 4 College ? Finalist (?-1); Year 5 College Grand Champion (4–0)
Oliver Tungol	2?	5?	3?-2?	60?	Year 1 College Weekly Finalist (0–1); Year 2 College Grand Finalist (3–1); others?
Percival Biadora	3?	4?	3?-3?	50?	Year 4 College ? Finalist (?-1); Year 5 College Quarterly Finalist (2–1); others?; Year 7 College Monthly? Finalist (1?-1)

* - attained with a partner

=== Other notables ===
- Ferdinand Makalinao of UP Manila (Year 1 College Grand Champion) was known to perform math computations without using pen and paper.
- Alfonso Gonzales III of UPLB (Year 2 College Grand Champion) invested PHP 300,000 (~ USD 7,500) of his championship prize in an equity mutual fund which has since grown to PHP 2.9 million (~ USD 70,000) as of Nov. 2012.
- All of the Year 5 Grand Champions also won their respective levels at the 1997 ASEAN Invitational.
- The Year 5 competitors from Ramon Magsaysay High School - Manila included Roselle Ambubuyog, the visually impaired student achiever. They made it as fas as the Monthly Finals.
- Edmond Robert (Grade 6) and Louis Allen (Grade 5) Ortal were the only sibling team to join. They made it as far as the Year 6 Quarterfinals representing Divine Light Academy - Bacoor
- Rogelio "Bong" Barrameda (TV quiz champion from Student Canteen's IQ 7 contest) served as the question formulator in Year 9.

== Sponsorship ==
- At least during its first year in 1992, Battle of the Brains was produced in cooperation with the Philippine Department of Education, Culture, and Sports.
- Various corporate sponsors (some of which provided the prizes to the winners of the different finals, indicated in asterisk (*)) have appeared on the show at various times, including the following:
  - Colgate Mintirinse
  - Ovaltine
  - Purefoods Tender Juicy Hotdog
  - Negros Navigation*
  - Milo
  - Tivoli Ice Cream
  - Goldstar
  - Strepsils Lozenges
  - Serg's Moonbits
  - PLDT
  - Hudson Paints
  - Keebler
  - Metro Pacific Corporation
  - Wyeth Philippines
  - Success Unlimited Enterprises
  - Compton's Encyclopedia*
  - Zebra Pens
  - Tru-Shine Shoe Polish*

== Influence and legacy ==
Throughout its duration, Battle of the Brains was recognized as a well-known quiz show on Philippine television, particularly among students and individuals interested in trivia. The show's name is often used to refer to quiz competitions in the Philippines, irrespective of their format or level of television coverage. Theresa Reyes Alvarez holds the copyright for "Battle of the Brains," with registration number M 97-353.

Its level of fame during its time can be compared to those of the Kilometrico Quiz Date and Student Canteen's IQ7 in the 1960s-1970s, and the Digital LG Quiz in 1999–2004. It has also served as the model for various quiz competitions, televised or not, in the Philippines.

David Celdran's name has become strongly associated with the show. Winners at the show, especially in later stages and as Grand Champions, are known to have gotten celebrity attention within their school campuses.

The comedy show Tropang Trumpo parodied the show in a segment called Battle of the Brainless. In each episode, the competitors are said to come from schools whose names sound very similar to those of actual Philippine schools. Each question given by host is usually met by incorrect and humorous responses from competitors. The episode mostly ends in a tie for all schools. The host (usually portrayed by Ogie Alcasid) is also known to wear shorts, which is revealed as he moves away from his rostrum.

In David Celdran's recollection published March 2021 he expressed surprise at how people actually remember Battle of the Brains. He initially thought it would not survive the 1990s TV ratings competition since it was serious and scholastic, lacked showbiz gimmickry, was akin to a 90-minute IQ marathon, and had 30-second math problems which he joked as "television suicide". But what made the show entertaining, he recalled, were the geniuses onstage who became stars in their own right. He described the competition as a level playing field where “anyone could beat anyone” and many lesser known schools can challenge the elite schools and win the championships, "and that made it exciting because it wasn’t one-sided. It’s not like Ateneo wins basketball every year".

== Awards ==
Year	Award	Category	Individual winner	Citation
1993	PMPC Star Awards	Best Game Show	-	
1994	PMPC Star Awards	Best Game Show	-	
1994	PMPC Star Awards	Best Game Show Host	David Celdran	
1995	PMPC Star Awards	Best Game Show	-	
1995	Catholic Mass Media Awards	Special Citation	-	
1996	PMPC Star Awards	Best Game Show	-	
1996	PMPC Star Awards	Best Game Show Host	David Celdran	
1996	Catholic Mass Media Awards	Lorenzo Ruiz Award for Television Entertainment		for "inspiring its youthful audience to strive for excellence in school and in everything they do"

== See also ==
- List of programs previously broadcast by Radio Philippines Network
- List of programs broadcast by People's Television Network
