= Uniwide Sales =

Defunct retail company in the Philippines

Uniwide Sales, Inc.

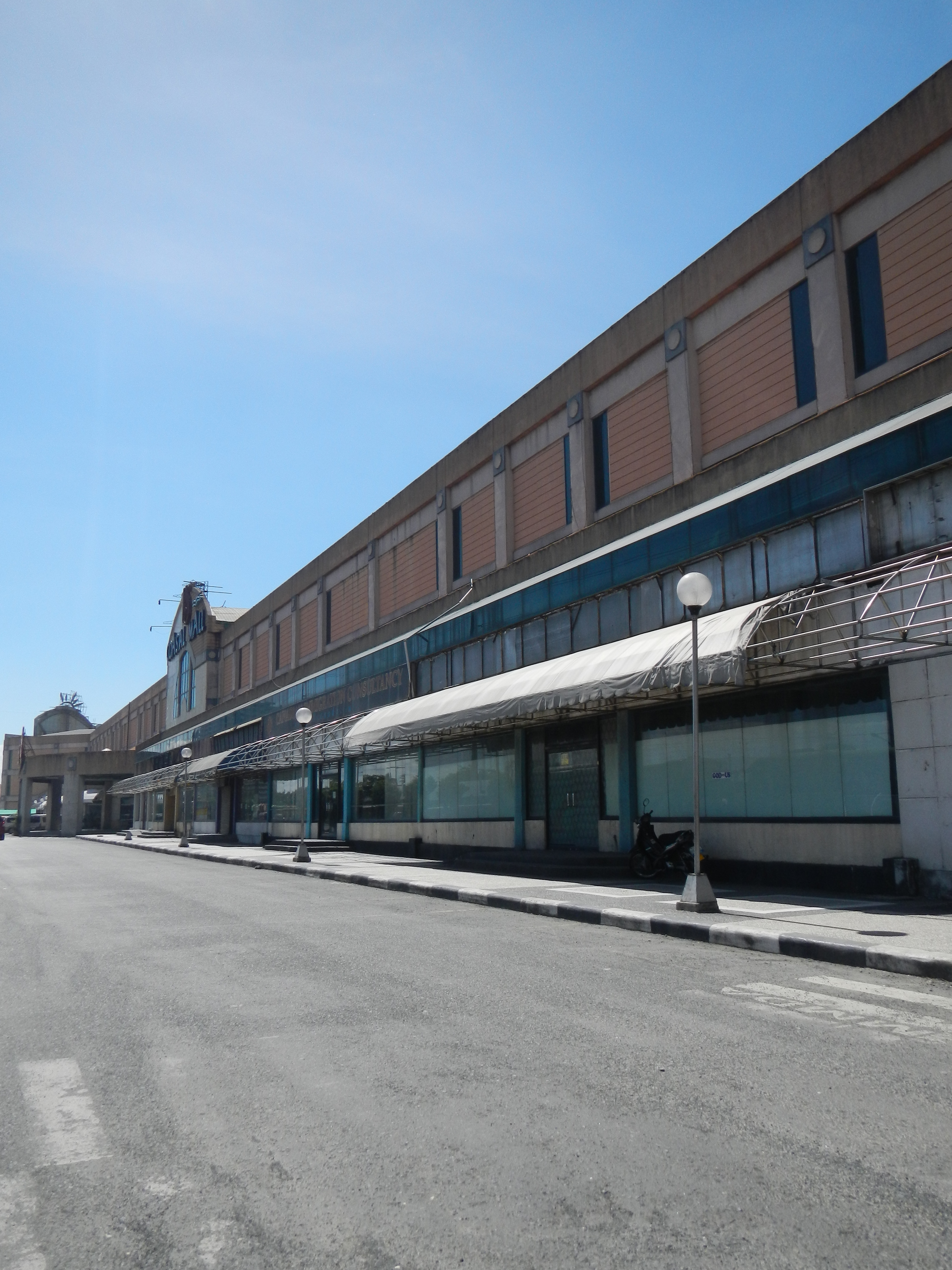
- Type: Private
- Industry: Shopping malls
- Founded: January 1975; 51 years ago Avenida Rizal, Manila
- Defunct: June 2013; 13 years ago
- Headquarters: Parañaque and Las Piñas, Metro Manila
- Number of locations: 2
- Area served: Philippines
- Key people: Jimmy Gow (Founder, Chairman and CEO)
- Owner: Uniwide Holdings
- Website: http://www.uni-wide.com (Archived from the Internet Archive)

Uniwide Sales, Inc. was a retail operator in Metro Manila, Philippines. It was incorporated in January 1975 by Chinese Filipino entrepreneur Jimmy Gow to operate Uniwide commercial shopping centers, such as leasing commercial spaces within the compound of their malls and department stores.

Uniwide had about 2,000 employees. Its competing retailers in the 1970s and the 1980s were COD Department Store, Ever Gotesco Malls, Plaza Fair, Isetann and The Landmark; however, they lagged behind SM Supermalls, Robinsons Malls and Ayala Malls. It had two branches and was set to be closed down by the order of the Securities and Exchange Commission.

== History ==
Established in January 1975 as the Uniwide Sales Textile Bargain House Center on Avenida Rizal, Uniwide quickly diversified. Capitalizing on its initial success, the Gow family expanded the business to include ready-to-wear apparel and accessories, evolving it into a comprehensive department store and supermarket chain.

=== Uniwide's Warehouse Club era and subsequent challenges ===
In 1988, Uniwide revolutionized Philippine retail by introducing the mass-oriented warehouse club concept, opening its first Uniwide warehouse club branch in Libis, Quezon City in the same year. Over the next two years, the company rapidly established a chain of these clubs in prime locations across the country. While innovative, this aggressive expansion unfortunately marked the beginning of significant financial challenges for Uniwide.

Many of Uniwide's key assets were eventually sold off. For example, its abandoned building in Cubao, Quezon City, destroyed by a fire in 1996, was acquired by Puregold Price Club Inc., owned by the Co family. Similarly, an unfinished Uniwide building in Mandaue City, Cebu, originally slated to be a warehouse club, was reportedly occupied by dwellers before its site was redeveloped into the Parkmall shopping center. The Uniwide warehouse on Marcos Highway was demolished, with the lot sold to Robinsons Land Corporation's commercial centers division to make way for Robinsons Metro East. Another property in Libis, Quezon City, was sold to Wilcon Depot. By 2006, Uniwide's remaining warehouse clubs in Metromall (Las Piñas), Tarlac City, Malolos (Bulacan), Caloocan, Novaliches (Quezon City), and Sucat (Parañaque) were divested and subsequently converted into Super 8 Grocery Warehouse branches.

Beyond its retail endeavors, Uniwide also ventured into media, notably partnering with RPN-9 as title sponsor of the popular quiz show Battle of the Brains for the first 7 (out of 9) years of the show's existence.

=== The impact of the Asian Financial Crisis ===
Uniwide officially entered corporate rehabilitation in 1998, a direct consequence of the Asian financial crisis. At this point, its retail footprint consisted of eight warehouse clubs and two department stores. However, severe liquidity problems drastically affected earnings, with sales plummeting from ₱14.5 billion in 1997 to just ₱4.3 billion by 2000.

=== Stalled Baguio City development ===
Uniwide repeatedly attempted to develop a mall at the Baguio City Market in Baguio, Benguet. However, strong and sustained opposition from local vendors, stall owners, and various associations consistently kept the project on hold, ultimately preventing its realization.

=== The rise and fall of Uniwide Coastal Mall ===
Envisioned in the 1990s as what would have been the Philippines' largest shopping mall complex, the Uniwide Coastal Mall was a monumental undertaking. It was constructed on a 10-hectare parcel within the Manila Bay Development Corporation's (MBDC) 40-hectare Central Business Park II (now the Manila Bay Freeport Zone Bay City) in Parañaque City. This ambitious project took shape while Cabangis served as Uniwide Holdings Inc.'s (UHI) chief financial officer and Rey as its controller.

The mall reached 90% completion and was partially operational, with several tenants already occupying finished sections fronting Roxas Boulevard. However, the onset of the 1997 Asian financial crisis abruptly halted its progress. As a result, the Uniwide Coastal Mall never formally opened as a complete shopping destination. It only housed a limited number of operational establishments, including GALA Bowling Club, Shakey's Pizza, Prodatanet, Jollibee, B.I.R. Parañaque, Wide Aero Av School, Uniwide Theatre and Movie Hall, McDonald's, Mang Inasal, Hyundai Showroom, Super8 Grocery Warehouse, and Dunkin' Donuts.

In a significant pivot, the building was later repurposed as a transport terminal for public utility vehicles traveling to and from Batangas and Cavite. In May 2006, its ambition of being the country's largest mall was superseded by the opening of the SM Mall of Asia.

The mall was padlocked on October 29, 2014, following a legal dispute between Uniwide Holdings and its lessor, Manila Bay Development Corporation.

The Uniwide Coastal Mall's final chapter arrived with the construction and opening of the Parañaque Integrated Terminal Exchange (PITX) in 2018. With a new, modern transport hub in place, Coastal Mall ceased all operations and was subsequently abandoned. In April 2022, with approval from the Philippine Reclamation Authority obtained by MBDC through its Manila Bay Freeport Zone property, the mall's main structure was completely demolished.

=== Uniwide's struggle for revival and legacy ===
Amidst a backdrop of numerous legal battles and significant financial setbacks, Uniwide founder Gow has persistently strived to navigate the company's challenges. His efforts have focused on recovering losses, reclaiming valuable assets and properties for Uniwide Sales, all while managing a multitude of ongoing legal cases.

A notable development in Uniwide's retail history occurred in 2006 when its former in-house supermarket chain, Super8 Grocery Warehouse, spun off from its parent company. It was established as Super8 Retail Systems, Inc., an entirely independent entity that has since grown to operate over 70 branches across Luzon.

The site of the former Uniwide Metromall Las Piñas, officially known as Knows Best Bargain Center, Inc., is reportedly slated for redevelopment by SM Prime, with plans to transform it into SM Metromall Las Piñas.

While many of Uniwide's former branches have been demolished, one significant exception remain operational and largely unchanged: Knows Best Bargain Center, Inc. (Uniwide Las Piñas) This branch stands as the last operational remnants of the original Uniwide retail network that have not undergone demolition or extensive renovation.

== Metro Mall Las Piñas ==
Once a retail hub, Metro Mall Las Piñas, situated on Alabang-Zapote Road, now stands as a semi-abandoned and increasingly decrepit "dead mall." it was originally built and operated by Uniwide Sales.

The mall has become notorious for its advanced state of disrepair. Large sections are perpetually unlit, while widespread ceiling leaks and collapses, stemming from a severe lack of maintenance, are evident throughout. To mitigate the constant ingress of water, plastic tarpaulins have been crudely hung over numerous leaking sections of the roof.

Comprising three retail storeys and basement parking, the ground floor of Metro Mall still hosts various stalls and stores, primarily selling budget-friendly goods. A Super8 Grocery Warehouse remains one of its anchor tenants, providing a functional retail presence.

In stark contrast, the second floor is largely empty, with half of its area blocked off, though it remains accessible. The third floor, now entirely inaccessible and sealed off, once housed a cinema, the Euroland amusement park, and Planet Music, a KTV bar. A striking feature of the mall's past grandeur is the third atrium, which formerly served Euroland; it boasts a massive artificial tree that impressively spans four storeys, from the ground floor up to the ceiling.

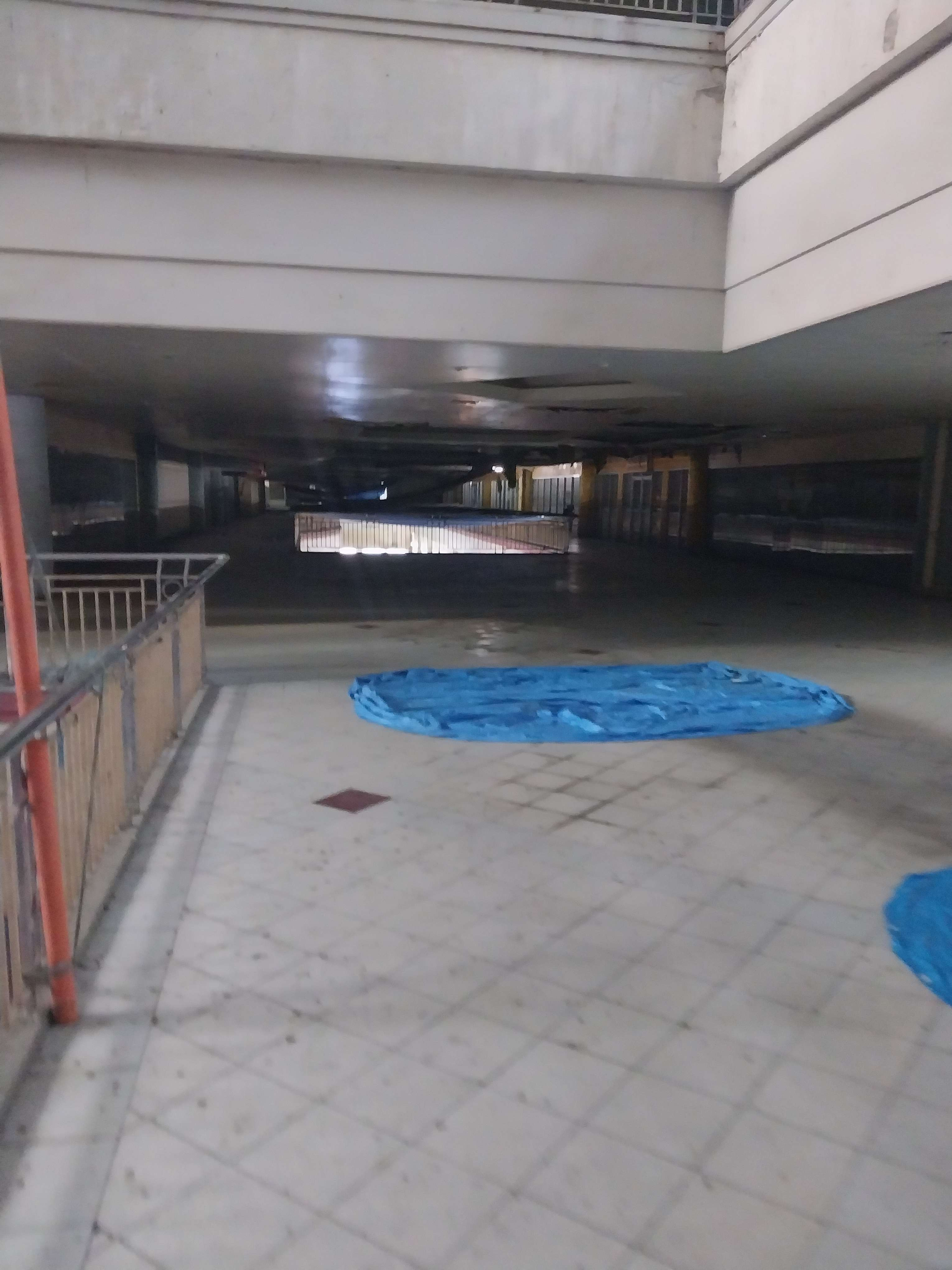
Largely-abandoned second floor of the Uniwide Metro Mall.
