= Bloomfield Academy Center for Science and Technology =

Private school in Las Piñas, Philippines

- Front of school

Location
- BF Resort Village, W Tecson St, Las Piñas, 1740 Metro Manila; Philippines; 14°25′54″N 120°59′27″E

Information
- Religious affiliation: Roman Catholic
- Established: 1985
- Principal: Ms. Elsie T. Torreno
- Grades: K to 12
- Enrollment: About 700
- Colors: Green and Gold
- Athletics: ALPPS, VARSITY
- Newspaper: The B.A Leaf
- Website: bloomfield.edu.ph

Bloomfield Academy Center for Science and Technology, formerly known only as Bloomfield Academy, is a private school centered in the Philippines in Las Piñas. The school was founded in 1985 and started education services in the early 1986. The school currently has STEM curriculum introduced. The school is currently owned by Mr. and Mrs. Llarena of Dane Publishing Inc..

== History ==
In 1985, The school began operation with just a few classrooms and grade school service. They had their first 450 students from Kindergarten to Grade 4. Students are given their first Holy Communion and participates in other student events such as the Foundation Day.

In the early 90s up to the present, the school was subject to a dramatic renovation project which added many new classrooms and facilities, adding more classrooms as the time goes on. The school experienced a dramatic increase in students, which continues until today. The Singapore Science Method is adapted in the Grade School.

== Facilities ==
The school currently offers preschool, elementary, junior high school and senior high school. The school does not currently offer Special Education. The school has four comfort rooms, two multipurpose halls, a covered court, a S.T.E.M lab, a music room, a speech laboratory, a computer laboratory and others. The school is currently applying for PAASCU accreditation.
