= Universidad de Dagupan =

Private university in Pangasinan, Philippines

- Pamantasan ng Dagupan (Filipino)
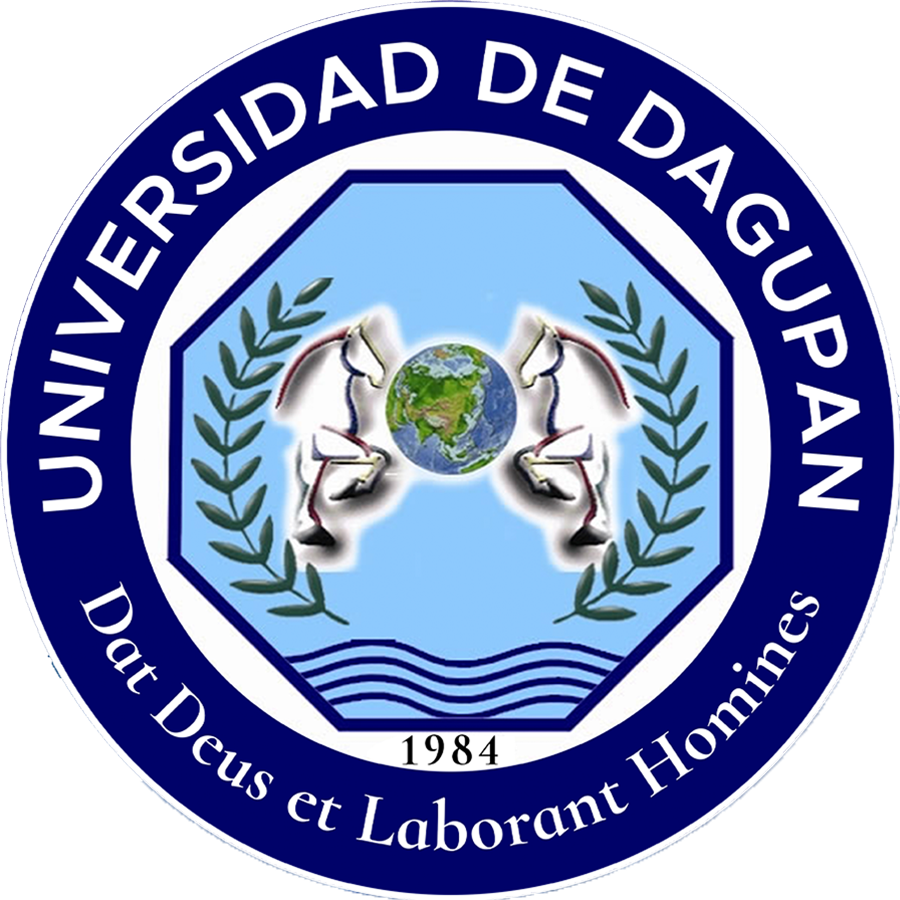
- Former name: Colegio de Dagupan (1984–2022)
- Motto: Dat Deus Et Laborant Homines
- Motto in English: God's Given Gifts Developed by Man
- Type: Private Non-sectarian higher education institution
- Established: 1984; 42 years ago
- Chairman: DR. VOLTAIRE P. ARZADON
- President: Dr. Feliza Arzadon- Sua
- Vice-president: Dr. Awit C. Arzadon-Dalusong
- Location: Arellano Street, Dagupan, Pangasinan, Philippines 2400; 16°03′03″N 120°20′27″E
- Campus: Urban Dagupan, Pangasinan
- Alma Mater song: Universidad de Dagupan Hymn
- Colors: Blue and White
- Mascot: Blue Stallions
- Website: udd.edu.ph
- Location in Luzon Location in the Philippines

Universidad de Dagupan (formerly Colegio de Dagupan, Computronix College) is a private non-sectarian college located in Dagupan, Philippines.

Universidad de Dagupan campus

== Computronix College ==
- December 22, 1992: the school obtained college status registered with the Securities and Exchange Commission and began offering Bachelor of Science in Computer Engineering.
- 1993: with the continuing increase of enrollment, the college opened the Felisa Arzadon Memorial Extension to provide more classrooms for the growing student population. It also offered BS Accountancy, BS Commerce major in Management Information Systems, AB Major in Computer Teaching and BS Aeronautics Engineering.
- 1994: The Science Centrum was inaugurated, it housed all laboratories and computer facilities of the college. It was recognized as a virtual landmark in Dagupan. During this year the Liberal Arts, Commerce and Accountancy (LCA) building was also opened.
- 1995: the Engineering building located behind the Science Centrum was built.
- 1996: located beside the Science Centrum, a new school campus came into being. Among the facilities added to the College were the Campus Quadrangle, a basketball/volleyball court, brickyard park, the College Printing Press and the Administration Building.
  Colegio de Dagupan Campus
- In recognition of the noble achievements of this institution, Colegio de Dagupan was hailed as Champion in the search for the Cleanest and Greenest Higher Educational Institution (City Level).
- 1998: the VPA-CS building was built. It also opened a new and bigger library equipped with air conditioners, Internet Terminals, video library, CD-ROM equipped computers and other facilities located at the Administration Building.
- 2000: The new LCA Building was inaugurated. This building had an air-conditioned Chapel, a Clinic, a bigger Audio-Visual Room (AVR), HRM Laboratory, Offices and a number of classrooms.
- 2001: installed an elevator in the LCA Building.

== Colegio de Dagupan ==
- 2002: Colegio de Dagupan was given Level 1 accreditation by the Philippine Association of Colleges and Universities Commission on Accreditation (PACUCOA) for its BS Accountancy and BS Electronics and Communications Engineering courses.
- 2003: accredited Level I by the Philippine Association of Colleges and Universities Commission on Accreditation (PACUCOA) for its Bachelor of Elementary Education, Bachelor of Secondary Education, Bachelor in Science in Commerce with majors in Banking and Finance, Managerial Accounting and Management, Bachelor of Science in Computer Science and Bachelor of Science in Computer Engineering. It began offering Bachelor of Science in Nursing, and the course Caregiving.
- 2004: Philippine Association of Colleges and Universities Commission on Accreditation (PACUCOA) granted Level II accreditation to the College of Education for its Bachelor of Elementary and Secondary Education courses.
- 2005: Colegio de Dagupan as named now, was granted Level II Formal Accreditation Status by the Philippine Association of Colleges and Universities commission on Accreditation (PACUCOA) in Bachelor of Science in Commerce Major in Management, Managerial Accounting and Banking and Finance Program.
- 2006: Colegio de Dagupan underwent CHED’s Institutional Quality Assurance Monitoring and Evaluation (IQUAME). Consequently, on November 14, 2007, Colegio de Dagupan was classified by the CHED as Category A (t) pursuant to CMO No. 15 s. 2005, the highest in the said category.
- 2009: The Commission on Higher Education (CHED) Granted Full Deregualated Status of the Institution.
- 2011: Level III Formal accredited status in its BS in Computer Science program and Level II 2nd re-accredited status in its BS in Business Administration program after undergoing and successfully hurdling the stringent accreditation process administered by PACUCOA, last August 11–12, 2011.
- 2012: Just recently, the Commission on Higher Education granted a permit to Colegio de Dagupan to offer the Expanded Tertiary Education Equivalency and Accreditation Program (ETEEAP).
- 2012: The Commission on Higher Education (CHED) Granted Full Autonomous Status of the Institution.
- 2022: The college was granted university status and was renamed the Universidad de Dagupan.
- 2022: Dr. Voltaire P. Arzadon stepping down as university president. He has also been president of the institution for the previous 39 years, beginning with its founding in 1984. Dr. Feliza Arzadon-Sua has been appointed as the new second University President and Chief Executive Officer. And Dr. Voltaire P. Arzadon, the university's founder, continues to serve as Chairman of the Board of Trustees.

Colegio de Dagupan Chapel

Colegio de Dagupan currently has an open admissions policy to all those who wish to pursue a college education. Admission is based on the agreed academic and ethical standards as well as the student's willingness to abide by the rules, regulations and policies set by the college.

Admission of transferees from other colleges and universities shall be subject to the careful review of the credentials submitted to the college.

== Research Unit ==
The Research and Planning Unit, headed by the Research Director under the Office of the Vice President for Academic Affairs, is a service unit that assists Colegio De Dagupan faculty, staff, and students in their research endeavors. The office is responsible for coordinating and stimulating research and development activities in the college. It is working with the faculty and staff to increase external funding and to provide opportunities for professional growth that is critical to the overall health of the institution.

The Research Director and staff provide assistance with the processing of proposals, including administrative review and sign-off, and assist with the negotiation of external agreements in coordination with the Office of External Affairs. Assistance with the development of the proposal narrative and budget is also available. The Research Unit post-award responsibilities include institutional financial management of grants, contracts, and other externally funded agreements beginning immediately after the award.

== Student life ==
=== Student organizations ===
Students are given the chance to earn seats in the local political scene of the college through joining Colegio de Dagupan's Supreme Student Council (SSC) and various other accredited student organizations.

=== Athletics ===
Each College is informally represented by each team names and mascots:

- College of Information and Computing Studies: Silver Knights
- College of Engineering: (To be Updated)
- College of Health and Science: Green and Gold WildCats
- College of Arts Sciences and Education: Yellow Tigers
- College of Hotel and Restaurant Management: Red Dragons

Colegio de Dagupan one of the participating teams in the Yearly Celebrated Inter Collegiate Olympics where every school in Pangasinan and other neighboring schools compete in different sporting events.

The women's teams are called the Lady Stallions, the men's teams are called Blue Stallions.

The College Chorus is called Koro Colegio.

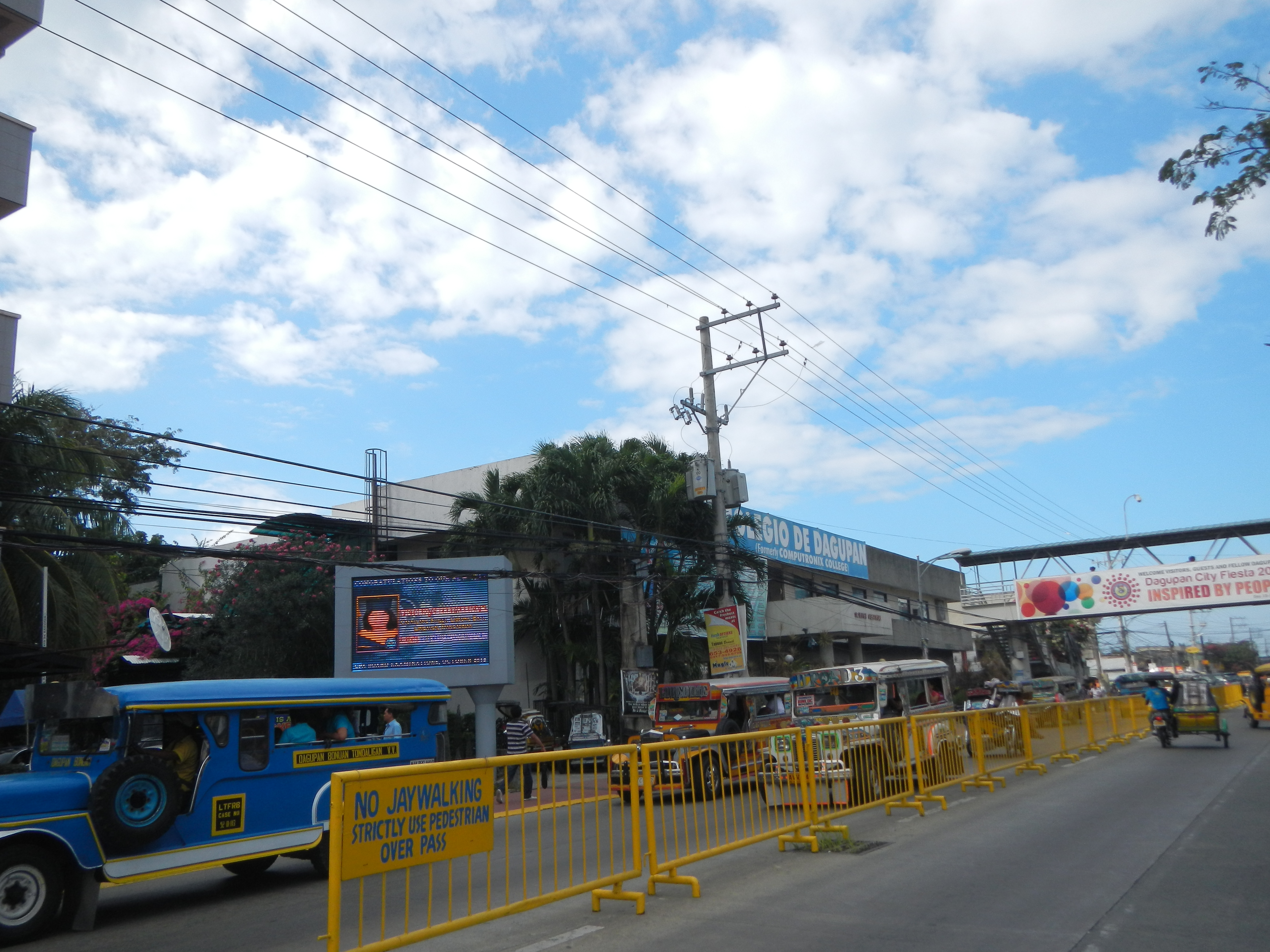
View from the other far side of the street

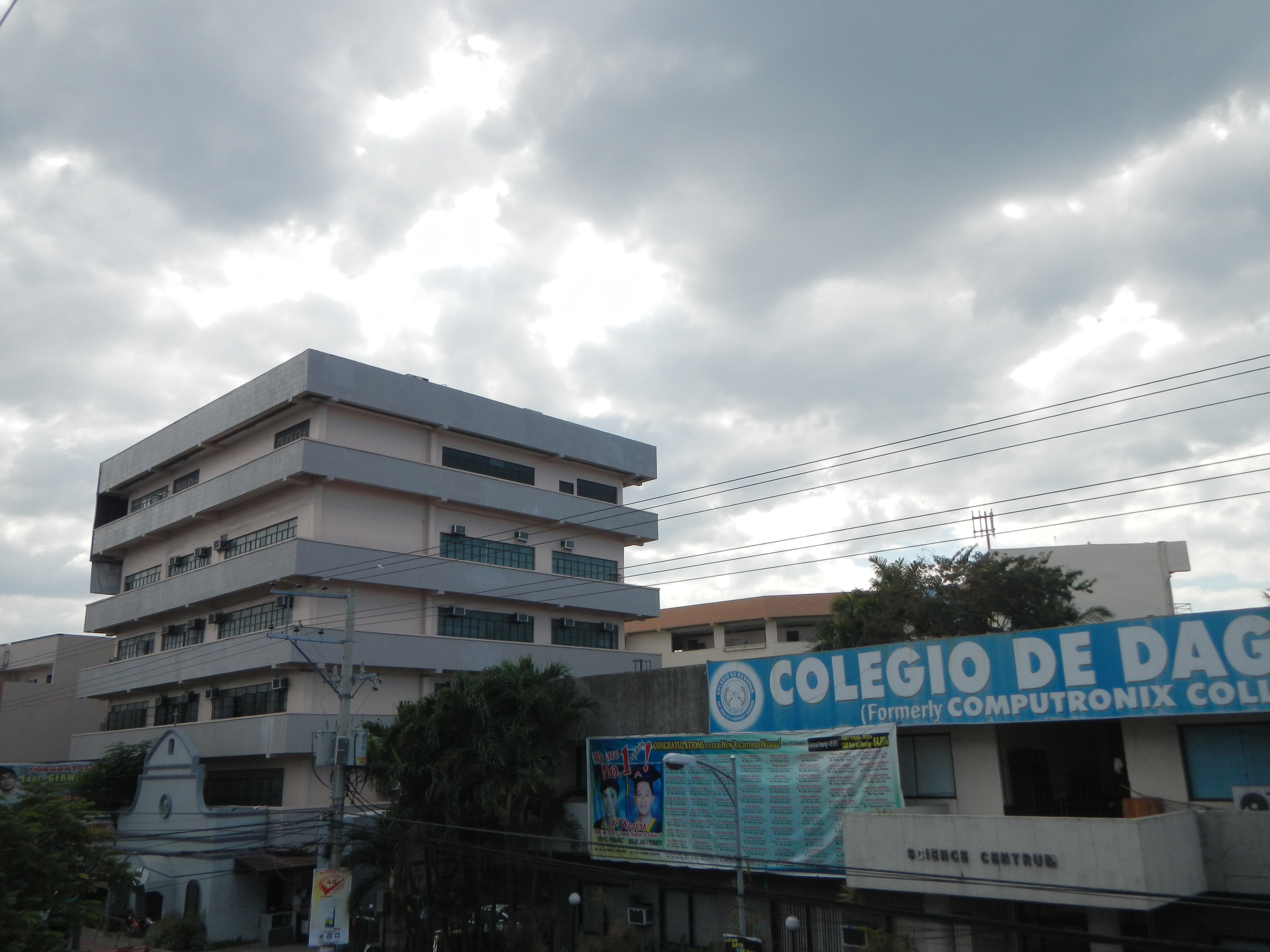
Remote view of the College from Nepo Mart

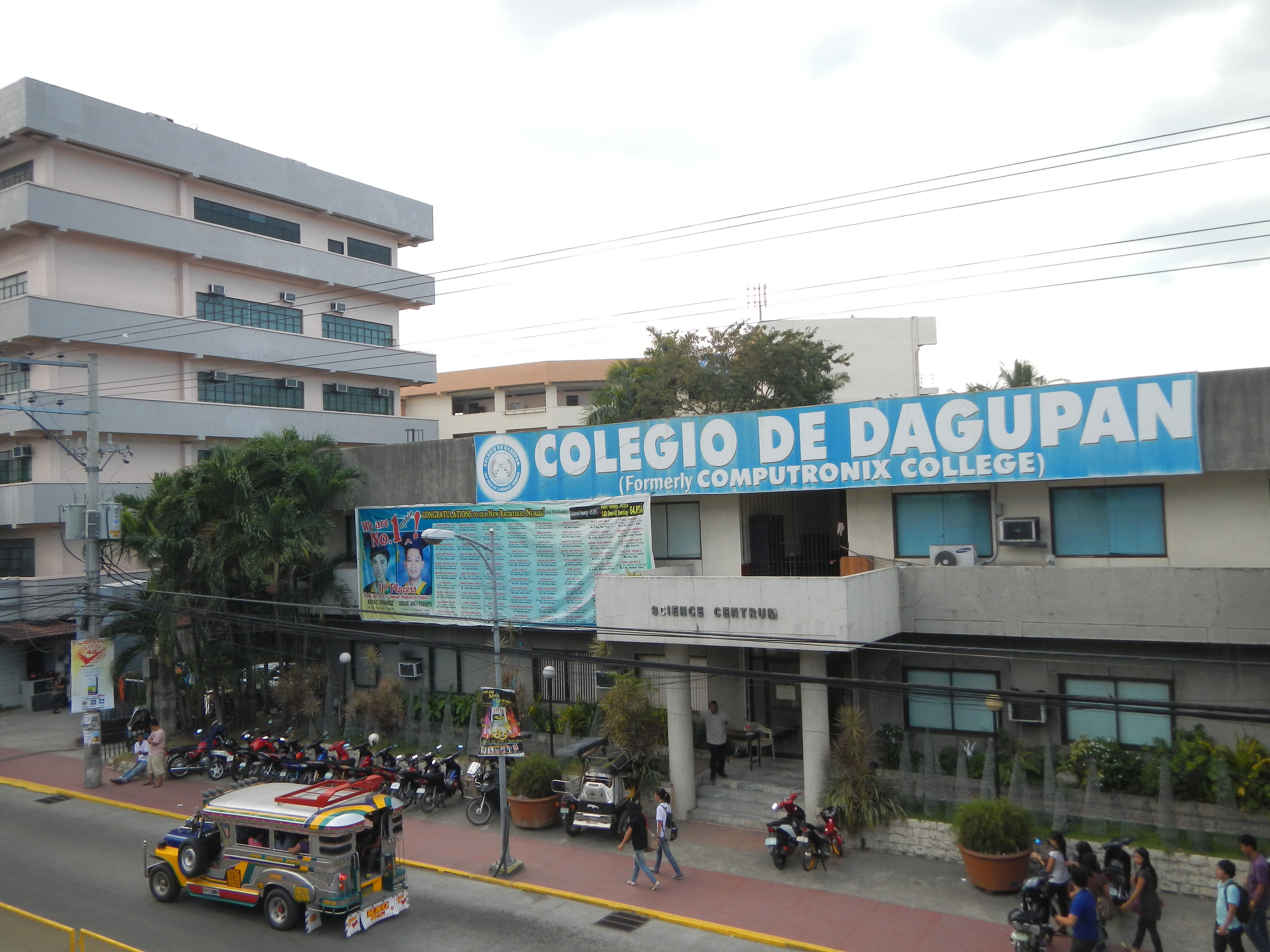
Facade

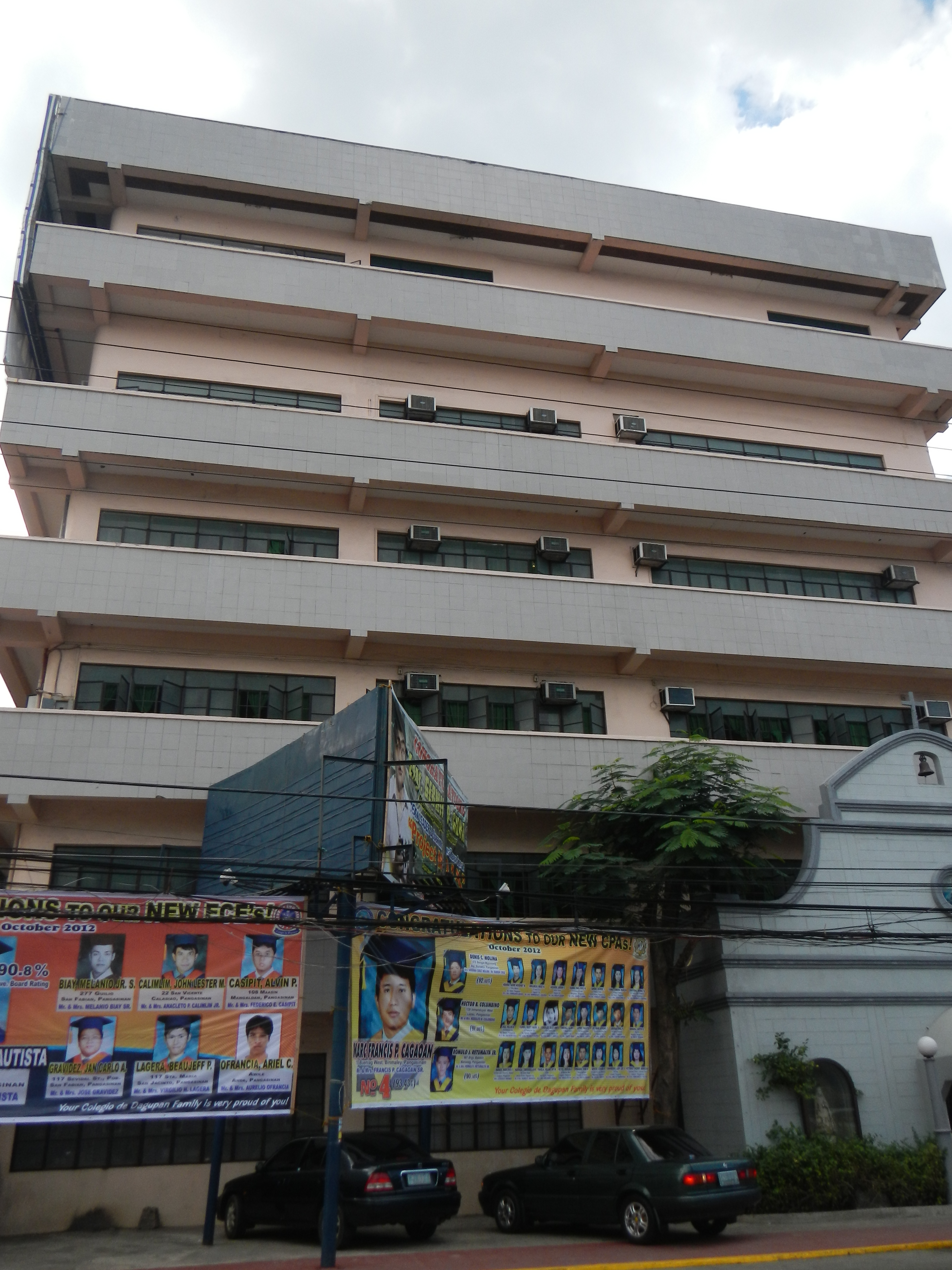
Frontage of the building beside the Chapel

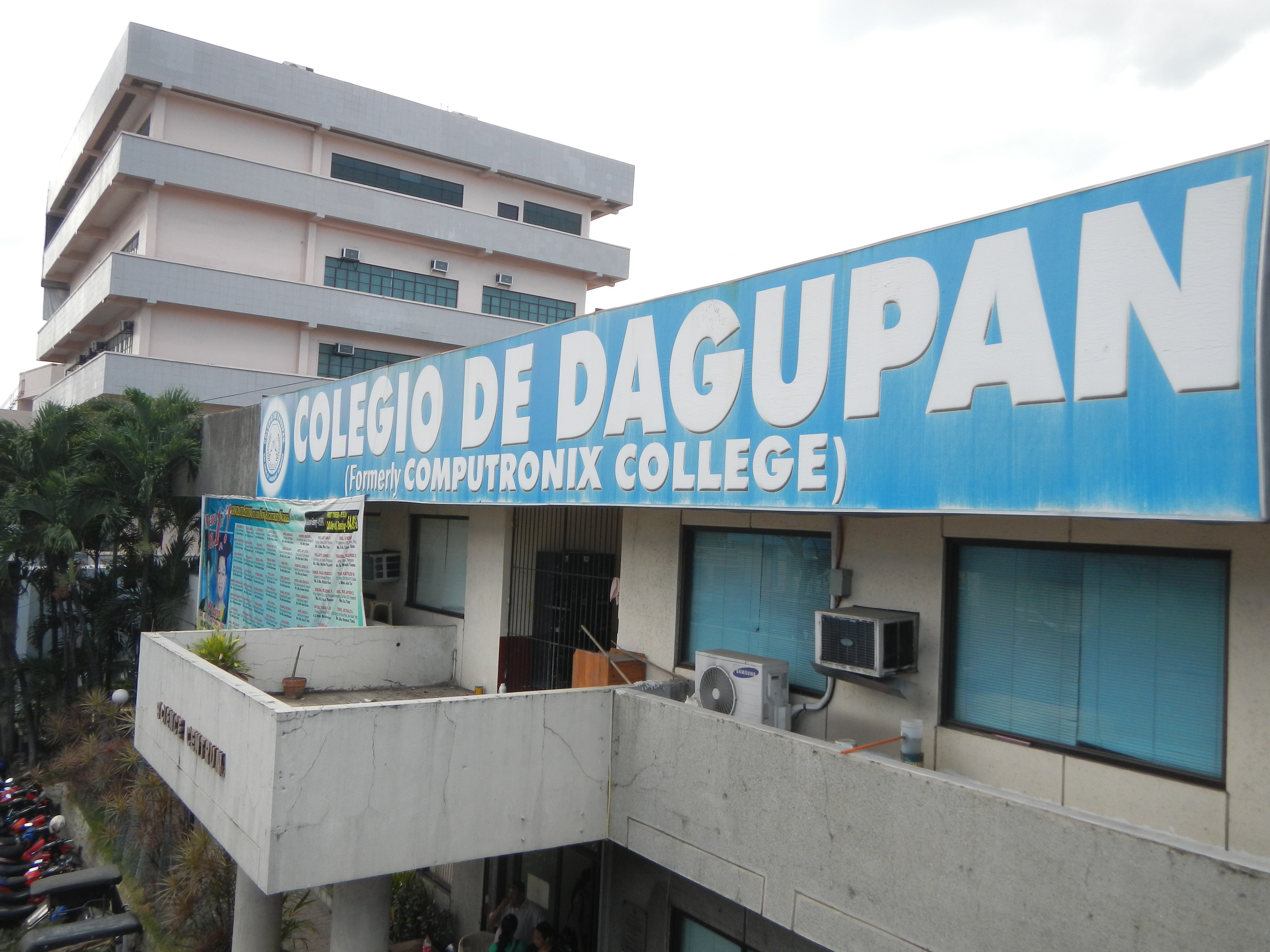
Right facade view from flyover
