= Cebu City National Science High School =

Public high school in Cebu City, Philippines

Location
- Salvador Street, Labangon, Cebu City, Cebu; Philippines
- Coordinates: 10°18′02″N 123°52′46″E

Information
- Type: Public high school
- Motto: Aim High! Soar High! Science High.
- Established: 1970
- Oversight: Cebu City Division
- Principal: Marilou Tabal Dela Cuesta (2024–present)
- Grades: 7 to 12
- Enrollment: Approximately 900 students (S.Y. 2018–2019)
- Average class size: 35 students
- Campus: Urban
- Nickname: Saihaiyistas, Scihiyistas, or Sayhayistas
- Newspaper: Scholar's Voice (English) & Tinig Iskolar (Filipino)

Cebu City National Science High School, commonly known as Sci-Hi or Science High, is one of the pioneering science schools in Cebu City, Philippines.

== History ==
Cebu City National Science High School, commonly known as Sci-Hi, is a secondary Ssience public high school system located in Salvador St. Labangon, Cebu City, Philippines. It was founded on July 17, 1970, and nationalized in the 1974–1975 school year.

The Cebu City National Science High School, which had been known as Cebu City Science High School, was established on July 17, 1970, as the brainchild of Dr. Aurelio A. Tiro, then Cebu City Schools Division superintendent. The school's overall concept was patterned after the objectives of the Philippine Science High School and in line with the Government's Science and Technological Education and Manpower Development Program.

On April 28, 1970, Resolution No. 81 of the Cebu City School Board was passed by the Hon. City Councilor Raymundo Crystal, then chairman of the Committee on Education, and requested the Cebu City Council to initiate the funding of a Cebu City Science High School with an appropriation of P50,000. Then it was followed with Resolution No. 772 of the Cebu City Council on May 7, 1970, appropriating the requested amount for the establishment of the school during the incumbency of Honorable Mayor Eulogio Borres. The school was nationalized under Presidential Decree 105 in SY 1974–1975.

Cebu City Science High School was established in Barangay Labangon in its present site, which is a property donated by Don Sergio Osmeña, Sr. to the City Government. The first building of the school was a modified 3-unit steel pre-fab Marcos-type school building. The school drew up a development plan, and the founding principal, Rosalina R. Kintanar, sought direct financial aid from the Office of the President in order to construct a two-storey Academic Library Building. The Science Building that was reconstructed from the pre-fab Marcos-type original, the ESEP Building, and thegGymnasium were added during the administration of Nicanora P. Creus. Succeeding principals also had their share in the development of school buildings and facilities.

The founding principal, Rosalina R. Kintanar, gathered 64 intelligent students and five teachers who started what is now the Cebu City National Science High School.

The founding principal was succeeded by administrators including Tereso M. Edo, who was appointed in April 1982; Nicanora P. Creus in October 1985; Pilar A. Tesaluna in February 1999; Severina B. Chin as OIC from May 2001 to July 2001; and Jesus G. Ortiz in August 2001. For the second time, Severina B. Chin was appointed as OIC from June 2002 to October 2002, and was finally re-appointed on November 15, 2002. In June 2012, Marites V. Patiño was appointed as the principal, and in June 2017, Dr. Evelyn R. Pielago assumed office. She was succeeded by Nathanael Flores in 2019. The school was then headed by Charlie L. Salve, who assumed office in 2022. Marilou T. Dela Cuesta was then appointed in 2024 and is currently the school head.

== Admission ==
Students must pass both written and oral entrance examinations.

All applicants must be part of the upper 10% of their graduating class and have grades of at least 87 percent in English, Math and Science, and at least 85 percent in other subjects in the first, second and third (if available) grading periods. All graduating pupils from the Special Science Elementary Schools in the Division of Cebu City with grades of at least 80 percent in all subjects.

The Cebu City National Science High School qualifying examination consists of items designed to measure the verbal aptitude, abstract reasoning, quantitative ability and the scientific aptitude of the applicant. The questions are based on the expected learning competencies of a graduating elementary student specifically in the areas of English, Mathematics, and Science. The non-verbal examination is composed of figures and illustrations. The screening committee determines the top 175 students (formerly 140) who have to confirm for enrollment.
