= Lourdes School of Quezon City =

Roman Catholic school in Quezon City, Philippines

Lourdes School Quezon City
- Official logo

Location
- Kanlaon Street corner Don Manuel Street, Santa Mesa Heights; Quezon City, Metro Manila; Philippines
- Coordinates: 14°37′47″N 120°59′50″E

Information
- Type: Private, Catholic, Coeducational basic education institution
- Motto: Pax et bonum (Latin for 'Peace and all good')
- Religious affiliations: Roman Catholic Church; Capuchin Franciscans
- Patron saints: Our Lady of Lourdes; St. Francis of Assisi
- Established: 1955; 71 years ago
- Founder: Order of Friars Minor Capuchin
- Rector: Cesar F. Acuin
- Principal: Ma. Cielo Herminia S. Pineda
- Director for Finance: Jeffrey G. Torres
- Campus Ministry and Mission Officer: John Rey Balaan
- Grades: Pre-kindergarten, kindergarten, 1st to 12th grade
- Gender: Male (grade school); Coeducational (high school)
- Campus type: Urban
- Colors: Midnight blue; Immaculate white; Light blue
- Athletics: Athletic Association of Private Schools; Philippine Athletic Youth Association; Quezon City Athletic Association; Quezon City Basketball League; Philippine Taekwondo Association; Milo Best Small Basketeers Philippines; Passerelle Basketball Tournament
- Mascot: Blue Titans
- Accreditation: PAASCU level 3
- Newspaper: The Pax et Bonum (high school); Troubadour (grade school)
- School hymn: Lourdes Forever
- Website: www.lsqc.edu.ph

Lourdes School Quezon City (LSQC) is a private, Catholic basic education institution run by the Order of Friars Minor Capuchin in Quezon City, Philippines. Located beside the National Shrine of Our Lady of Lourdes, it was founded in 1955 as Lourdes Catholic School. It began operating with 11 teachers and with Fr. Jesús de Ansoain as its first rector and principal. The school was later renamed to distinguish it from the then-newly established Lourdes School of Mandaluyong.

The school is named after and devoted to Our Lady of Lourdes, and is under the patronage of St. Francis of Assisi. Students and alumni of the school are called "Lourdesians" (Filipino: "Lourdesiano").

== History ==
After World War II destroyed the original church dedicated to Our Lady of Lourdes in Intramuros, Manila, the Capuchins built a new church in Quezon City in 1950. Four years later, Rev. Fr. Adolfo de Echavarri, superior of the Capuchins in the Philippines, along with other fellow Capuchins, envisioned Catholic schools and the means to evangelize communities entrusted to them.

In 1955, the school was established. It was built beside the then-newly constructed Lourdes Church, which is now a National Shrine. As the population of students increased, a fourth floor, which now holds the rooms for grade 6 students, was added to the original building. A new building was later constructed in May 1967 for the high school department.

The Capuchins started a Financial Assistance Program (FAP) in 1970 wherein tuition discounts were given to students. LSQC's high school department has been coeducational since school year 1978–1979, when it admitted the first batch of female students. Along with other Capuchin schools in Metro Manila, it formed the first Inter-Capuchin Schools Athletic and Academic Meet in 1984.

The high school department received its first accreditation by PAASCU in 1992, and the grade school department in 1997. The high school department was granted a level 3 accreditation in 2007, and was once again given the same level re-accredited status in 2012.

A new, five-storey building for the high school campus was erected in 1997. Today, the five-story building holds the classrooms for grades 7 and 8 as well as laboratories.

In 2015, the school celebrated its 60th founding anniversary. On this year, the construction of the Blessed José María de Manila Courtyard was completed.

== School program ==
Lourdes School Quezon City offers four levels of education, namely:

- Senior High School (Grades 11 and 12)
- Junior High School (Grades 7 to 10)
- Grade School (Grades 1 to 6)
- Pre-School (Pre-Kinder and Kindergarten)

Historically, LSQC was an exclusive school for boys across all levels; however, in the late 1970s, the high school department began admitting girl scholars. Its high school eventually became coeducational in 1998.

The senior high school program offers all four strands under the Academic Track, namely:

- Science, Technology, Engineering and Mathematics (S.T.E.M.)
- Accountancy Business and Management (A.B.M.)
- Humanities and Social Sciences (HUMSS)
- General Academic (G.A.)

Aside from its academic program, a financial assistance program is offered to academically competent children from low-income families.

== Official seal ==
The primary features of the school's seal are the three small crosses on the left and right sides of the logo, two arms (one bare and another sleeved in a brown Capuchin habit) in saltire position, a cloud on the foreground, and a prominent wooden cross (upon which the arms are nailed) in the background.

The three crosses symbolize the Holy Trinity, a primary focus of Franciscan spirituality. The bare arm is that of Jesus Christ who is believed in Christianity to have given his own life for humanity's salvation while the sleeved arm is of St. Francis of Assisi who, due to his saintly life patterned upon Christ's own and observant of teachings in the Gospel, earned the title as the “Mirror of Christ”. The big cross signifies the concept of "Becoming like Christ", which is a way of life striven for by Franciscans. The clouds represent heaven which in Christianity is the destiny and home of mankind in the afterlife. The school's logo features the motto "Pax Et Bonum", a traditional Franciscan greeting meaning "Peace and goodwill" (often erroneously translated as "Peace and all good", the word "all" not appearing in the original Latin).

The seal is prominently displayed on the school's uniforms, official bus, façade, and the skywalk connecting the grade school and high school departments.

== Accreditation ==
The school is accredited by the Philippine Accrediting Association of Schools, Colleges and Universities (PAASCU). Both the grade school and high school departments have been granted a level 3 status – making it only one of fifteen schools in Metro Manila with this highest level of accreditation.

== Gallery ==
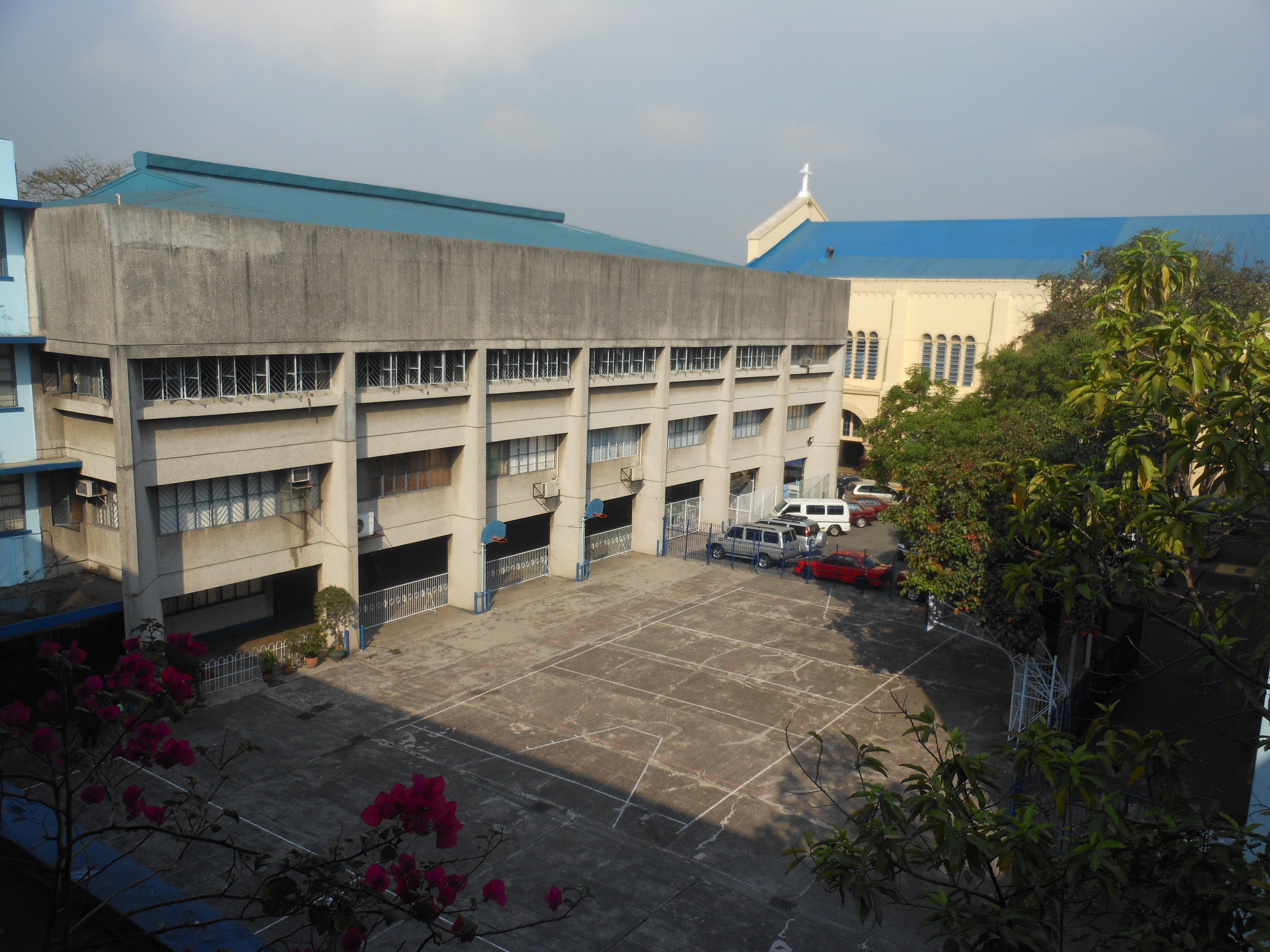
Extension building that houses the library, gymnasium, and faculty offices of the Grade School Department

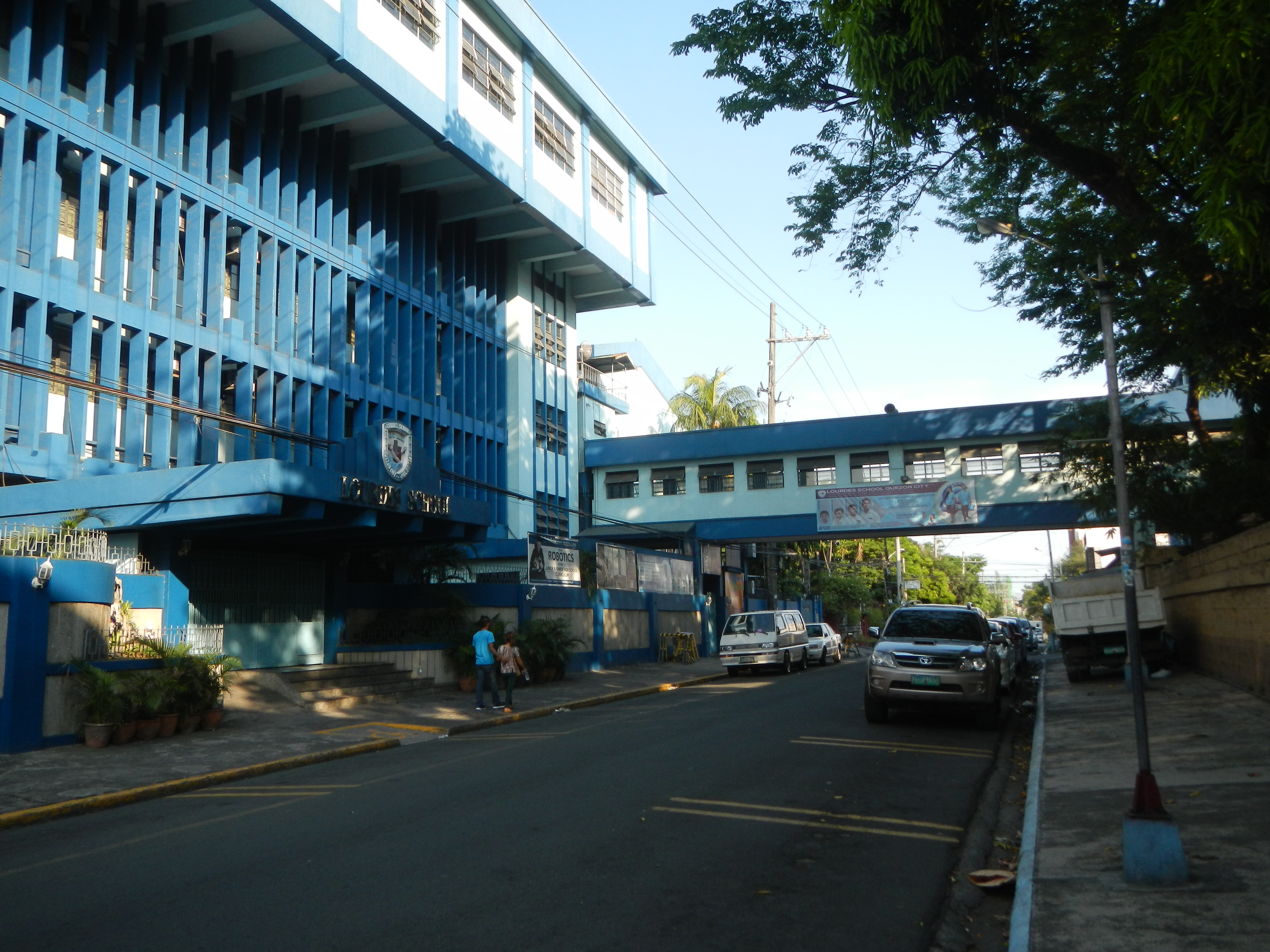
Building used by the High School Department, as seen from Apo Street

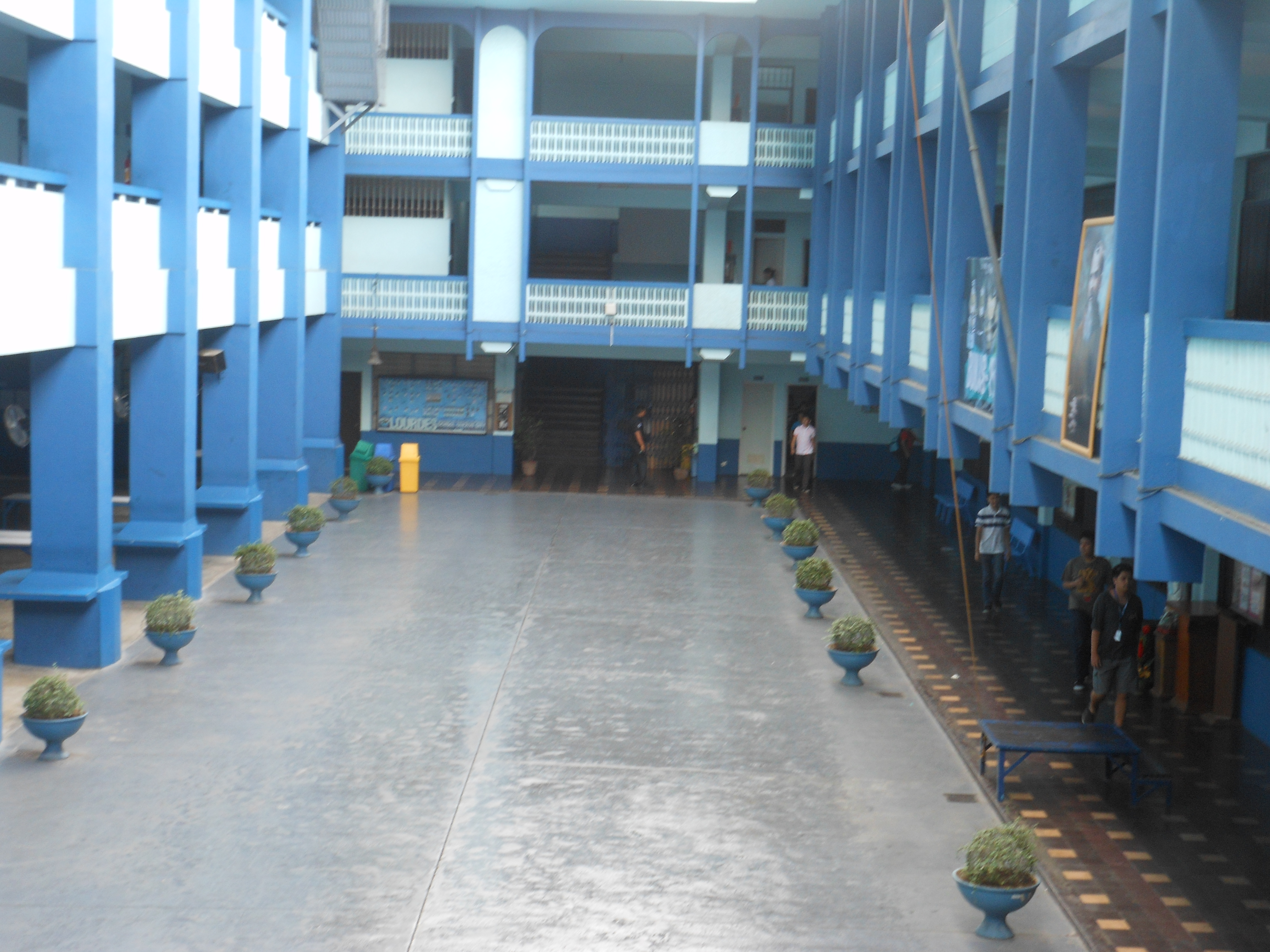
Inside the High School Department's building

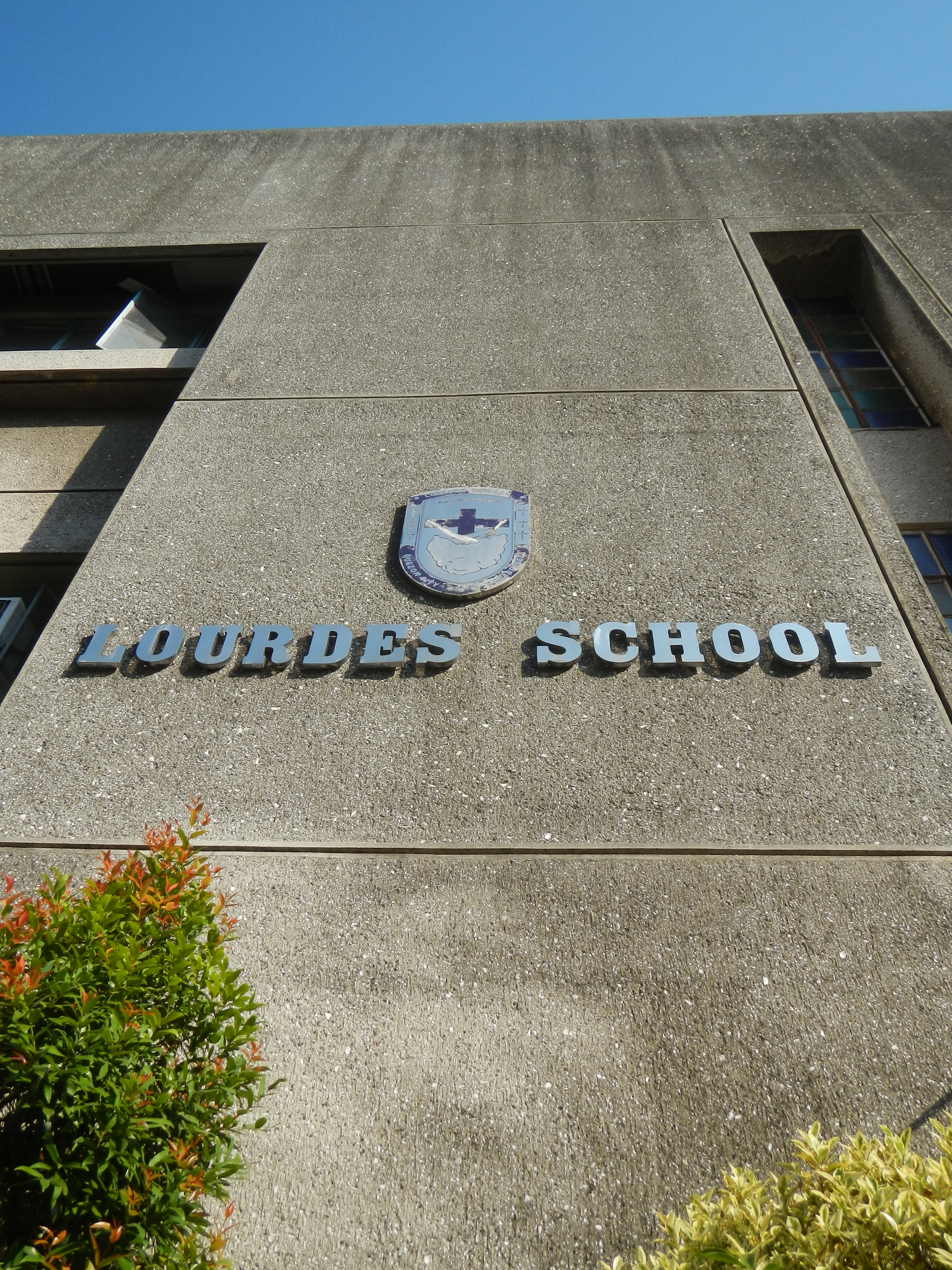
Logo
