= Milagros D. Ibe =

Filipino educator (1931–2023)

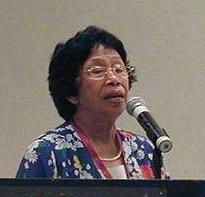
Milagros D. Ibe: Mathematics Educator, Teacher, Academic

Milagros Dimal Ibe (November 8, 1931 – April 22, 2023) was a Filipino teacher of mathematics. Dr. Ibe devised teacher-training programs and research studies that led to the development of policies in basic and higher education in the Philippines. According to the Science Education Institute of the Philippines, "she has left a legacy of teaching with compassion to the young generation of math and science teachers" and "her ability to simplify esoteric concepts into lessons easily understood by young minds significantly helped in demystifying mathematics".

== Educational background ==
Milagros Dimal Ibe was born in Lubao, Pampanga on November 8, 1931, but moved to Manila to study. She graduated summa cum laude from the now defunct Quezon College in Manila, with a BA in English and BSc major in mathematics. She taught for a few years in her hometown before she transferred to teach at the University of the Philippines Rural High School at Los Baños, Laguna. Eventually, she moved to the University of the Philippines Diliman, where she finished her Master of Arts major in curriculum and instruction. Later on, she got her PhD from the University of Toronto in Canada. She almost became Dean of the College of Education in 1990, but instead she became Vice Chancellor of the University of the Philippines Diliman.

== Retirement ==
Ibe retired from UP-ISMED in November 1996 on her 65th birthday, following the practice of those in government service, but she continued to work as consultant to various educational institutions and to the Professional Regulation Commission. Ibe, in her mid-70s, became the Dean of Graduate School of Miriam College in Quezon City and concurrently professor emeritus in the College of Education of the University of the Philippines, where she remained active in promoting, among other things, mathematics education.

Ibe died on April 22, 2023, at the age of 91.

== Awards and achievements ==
In 1993 Ibe was appointed Director of the University of the Philippines - Institute for Science and Mathematics Education Development (UP-ISMED). The Dolores Hernandez Lecture Series in science education was started by her during the start of her term, to be a monthly Friday afternoon event as part of the Institution's extension activities. The series continued through the years of her directorship and long after her term, though much less frequently. In December 1995, Dr. Ibe represented the Philippines in the Third International Mathematics and Science Study (TIMSS).
