= 2016 Bulacan local elections =

Philippine election

2016 Bulacan gubernatorial election
- May 9, 2016
- Registered: 1,640,615
- Turnout: 83.57%
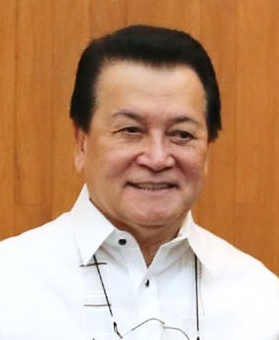

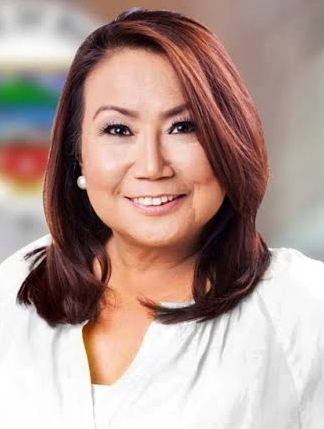

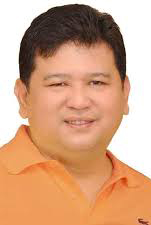
Nominee	Wilhelmino Sy-Alvarado	Josefina dela Cruz	Roderick Tiongson
Party	Liberal	NPC	UNA
Running mate	Daniel Fernando	Phillip Salvador	N/A
Popular vote	684,468	392,721	53,874
Percentage	56.40	32.36	4.43
Governor before election
Wilhelmino Sy-Alvarado
Liberal
Elected Governor
Wilhelmino Sy-Alvarado
Liberal

Local elections were held in Bulacan on May 9, 2016, as part of the 2016 Philippine general election. Voters selected their candidates of choice for all local positions: a town mayor, vice mayor and town councilors, as well as members of the Sangguniang Panlalawigan, the vice-governor, governor and representatives for the four districts of Bulacan and the lone district of San Jose del Monte.

== Gubernatorial and Vice Gubernatorial election ==
=== Governor ===
Incumbent Governor Wilhelmino Sy-Alvarado ran for his third and final term. His notable opponents were former Governor and Philippine Postal Corporation Postmaster Josefina dela Cruz, who substituted his brother, former governor and incumbent congressman Joselito Mendoza, and incumbent San Miguel Mayor Roderick Tiongson.

Bulacan Gubernatorial Election
Party	Candidate	Votes	%
Liberal	Wilhelmino Sy-Alvarado	684,468	56.40
NPC	Josie dela Cruz	392,721	32.36
UNA	Erick Tiongson	53,874	4.43
Independent	Jonjon Mendoza	50,467	4.16
Independent	Fernando Dizon	12,854	1.06
Independent	Clemente de Guzman	5,994	0.49
Independent	Ernesto Balite	3,361	0.28
Independent	Ermalyn Carmen	3,140	0.26
Independent	Apaul Libiran	2,934	0.24
Independent	Andrew Gonzales	2,915	0.24
Independent	Ceo Oloroso	946	0.08
Total votes		1,213,674	100
Liberal hold			

=== Vice Governor ===
Incumbent Vice Governor Daniel Fernando ran for a third and final term. His opponents were fellow film actor Phillip Salvador and former Vice Governor and former 2nd district representative Willie Villarama.

Bulacan Vice gubernatorial election
Party	Candidate	Votes	%
Liberal	Daniel Fernando	834,042	68.72
NPC	Phillip Salvador	308,351	25.41
Independent	Willie Villarama	71,286	5.87
Total votes		1,213,679	100
Liberal hold			

== Congressional elections ==
=== 1st District ===
Incumbent Ma. Victoria Sy-Alvarado is term-limited; her son Jose Antonio will run for the seat. His opponent was First District Board Member Michael Fermin.

2016 Philippine House of Representatives election in Bulacan 1st District.
Party	Candidate	Votes	%
Liberal	Jose Antonio Sy-Alvarado	157,828	57.08
NPC	Michael Fermin	118,663	42.92
Total votes		276,491	100
Liberal hold			

=== 2nd District ===
Gavini "Apol" Pancho was the incumbent.

2016 Philippine House of Representatives election in Bulacan 2nd District.
Party	Candidate	Votes	%
NUP	Apol Pancho	266,647	94.61
Independent	Jaime Villafuerte	11,609	4.12
KBL	Louie Angeles	3,587	1.27
Total votes		281,843	100
NUP hold			

=== 3rd District ===
Joselito Mendoza is the incumbent. His opponent was former Representative and former San Rafael Mayor Lorna Silverio.

2016 Philippine House of Representatives election in Bulacan 3rd District.
Party	Candidate	Votes	%
NUP	Lorna Silverio	119,988	52.04
Liberal	Jonjon Mendoza	110,573	47.96
Total votes		230,561	100
NUP gain from Liberal			

=== 4th District ===
Incumbent Linabelle Villarica will run for her third and final term. Her opponent is Meycauayan City Mayor Joan Alarilla.

2016 Philippine House of Representatives election in Bulacan 4th District.
Party	Candidate	Votes	%
Liberal	Linabelle Ruth Villarica	216,963	84.42
NPC	Joan Alarilla	40,043	15.58
Total votes		257,006	100
Liberal hold			

=== San Jose del Monte ===
Incumbent Arthur B. Robes is term-limited and opted to run for Mayor of San Jose del Monte. His wife, Florida Robes, ran for congresswoman, opposing the incumbent vice mayor Eduardo Roquero, Jr.

2016 Philippine House of Representatives election in San Jose del Monte, Bulacan Lone District
Party	Candidate	Votes	%
AR	Florida Robes	83,945	52.58
Liberal	Eduardo Roquero Jr.	75,692	47.42
Total votes		159,637	100
AR hold			

== Sangguniang Panlalawigan Elections ==
All 4 Districts of Bulacan will elect Sangguniang Panlalawigan or provincial board members. The first (including Malolos) and fourth (including San Jose del Monte) districts sends three board members each, while the second and third districts sends two board members each. Election is via plurality-at-large voting; a voter can vote up to the maximum number of board members his district is sending.

=== 1st District ===
Board Members Ayee Ople and Toti Ople were the incumbents. Incumbent Board Member Michael Fermin ran for a seat in Congress. Also running is comedian-actor Long Mejia.

2016 Provincial Board Election in 1st District of Bulacan
Party	Candidate	Votes	%
Liberal	Ayee Ople	141,854	21.42
Liberal	Toti Ople	132,687	20.03
NPC	Allan Andan	114,802	17.33
NPC	Aika Sanchez	90,297	13.63
Liberal	Teddy Natividad	86,699	13.09
NPC	Elmer Santos	57,583	8.69
UNA	Long Mejia	38,302	5.78
Total votes		662,224	100

=== 2nd District ===
Board Member Buko dela Cruz is the remaining incumbent; Incumbent Senior Board Member Monet Posadas was term-limited and replaced by Ma. Lourdes "Baby Monet" Posadas.

2016 Provincial Board Election in 2nd District of Bulacan
Party	Candidate	Votes	%
Liberal	Buko dela Cruz	174,003	43.71
Liberal	Baby Monet Posadas	113,883	28.61
NPC	Chippy Tantingco	65,158	16.37
NPC	Jerome Reyes	44,952	11.29
Total votes		397,996	100

=== 3rd District ===
Nono Castro was the remaining incumbent. Incumbent Board Member Ernesto Sulit died in 2014, he was replaced by his daughter Norinyl Sulit-Villanueva; Sulit-Villanueva, however, did not seek reelection.

2016 Provincial Board Election in 3rd District of Bulacan
Party	Candidate	Votes	%
NPC	Nono Castro	105,015	29.32
Liberal	Emily Viceo	82,650	23.08
Liberal	Nick Bartolome	64,794	18.09
UNA	Aye Mariano	55,693	15.55
Independent	Emil Magtalas	42,355	11.82
Independent	Allan Villena	7,554	2.10
Total votes		358,061	100

=== 4th District ===
Allan Ray Baluyut was the remaining incumbent. Incumbent Board Members Jon-jon delos Santos and King Sarmiento were term-limited.

2016 Provincial Board Election in 4th District of Bulacan
Party	Candidate	Votes	%
NPC	Alex Castro	207,703	22.06
Liberal	Allan Ray Baluyut	179,120	19.03
Liberal	Lita delos Santos	136,223	14.47
NPC	Rosalyn Cabuco	121,597	12.92
Liberal	Vanny Capricho	83,629	8.88
Independent	Abe Aban	59,206	6.29
PDP–Laban	Josie Lopez	50,335	5.35
Independent	Ryan Cayabyab	45,218	4.80
Independent	Gigi Alcala	20,970	2.23
KBL	Joseph Burgos	15,353	1.63
LM	Larry Dela Merced	11,945	1.27
KBL	Rene Avellanosa	10,075	1.07
Total votes		941,374	100

== City and Municipal Elections ==
All cities and municipalities of Bulacan also elected their new mayor and vice-mayor in this election. The candidates for mayor and vice mayor with the highest number of votes won the respective seats; they were voted separately, and may therefore have derived from different parties. Below is the list of mayoralty candidates of each city and municipalities per district.

=== 1st District ===
- City: Malolos
- Municipalities: Bulakan, Calumpit, Hagonoy, Paombong, Pulilan

==== Malolos City ====
Mayor Christian Natividad is the incumbent. His opponent is incumbent Councilor Laurens (Didis) Domingo.

Malolos City Mayoralty Election
Party	Candidate	Votes	%
Liberal	Christian Natividad	57,187	63.69
NUP	Didis Domingo	32,601	36.31
Total votes		89,788	100
Liberal hold			

Vice Mayor Gilbert (Bebong) Gatchalian is the incumbent.

Malolos City Vice Mayoralty Election
Party	Candidate	Votes	%
Liberal	Bebong Gatchalian	60,210	70.32
NUP	Jeric Degala	25,417	29.68
Total votes		85,627	100
Liberal hold			

==== Bulakan ====
Mayor Patrick Neil Meneses is the incumbent.

Bulakan Mayoralty Election
Party	Candidate	Votes	%
Liberal	Patrick Neil Meneses	20,556	58.09
NPC	Noli Garcia	14,829	41.91
Total votes		35,385	100
Liberal hold			

Vice Mayor Alberto "Berting" Bituin is the incumbent. His main opponent is former PBA player and currently collegiate basketball coach Vergel Meneses.

Bulakan Vice Mayoralty Election
Party	Candidate	Votes	%
Liberal	Berting Bituin	16,239	45.60
Independent	Vergel Meneses	13,281	37.29
NPC	King Ramirez	6,091	17.10
Total votes		35,511	100
Liberal hold			

==== Calumpit ====
Mayor Jessie de Jesus is the incumbent.

Calumpit Mayoralty Election
Party	Candidate	Votes	%
Nacionalista	Jessie de Jesus	27,712	56.70
Liberal	Richieboy Mendoza	21,165	43.30
Total votes		48,877	100
Nacionalista hold			

Vice Mayor Zacarias Candelaria is the incumbent.

Calumpit Vice Mayoralty Election
Party	Candidate	Votes	%
Nacionalista	Zacarias Candelaria	30,661	66.34
Liberal	Ogie Reyes	15,556	33.66
Total votes		46,217	100
Nacionalista hold			

==== Hagonoy ====
Mayor Raulito "Amboy" Manlapaz, Jr. is the incumbent.

Hagonoy Mayoralty Election
Party	Candidate	Votes	%
Liberal	Amboy Manlapaz	41,478	81.47
Independent	Don-don Reyes	9,432	18.53
Total votes		50,910	100
Liberal hold			

Vice Mayor Pedro "Kap" Santos is the incumbent.

Hagonoy Vice Mayoralty Election
Party	Candidate	Votes	%
Liberal	Pedro Kap Santos	24,347	46.51
Lakas	Kenneth Bautista	14,043	26.83
PMP	Rey Santos	13,959	26.67
Total votes		52,349	100
Liberal hold			

==== Paombong ====
Mayor Isagani "Gani" Castro is the incumbent. His main opponents are incumbent Vice Mayor Marisa Ramos, Mary Anne Marcos, wife of former Mayor Donato Marcos and incumbent Councilor Frank Valencia.

Paombong Mayoralty Election
Party	Candidate	Votes	%
Independent	Ann Marcos	12,322	47.98
UNA	Gani Castro	6,307	24.56
Liberal	Marisa Ramos	5,863	22.83
PDP–Laban	Frank-Kiko Valencia	1,147	4.47
Independent	Efren Milanes	44	0.17
Total votes		25,683	100
Independent gain from UNA			

Paombong Vice Mayoralty Election
Party	Candidate	Votes	%
Liberal	Cristina Gonzales	10,365	41.69
Independent	Kap Ega Cabantong	9,575	38.51
UNA	Cristina Castro	4,924	19.80
Total votes		24,864	100
Liberal hold			

==== Pulilan ====
Incumbent Mayor Vicente Esguerra Sr. is term-limited. His party nominated Maritz Ochoa-Montejo who was attempting to be a first female mayor of Pulilan. Her opponent was incumbent Councilor Richard Nethercott.

Pulilan mayoralty election
Party	Candidate	Votes	%
Liberal	Maritz Ochoa-Montejo	19,217	43.34
PDP–Laban	Richard Nethercott	13,403	30.23
Independent	Bernardo Ramos	11,721	26.43
Total votes		44,341	100
Liberal hold			

Incumbent Vice Mayor Elpidio Castillo is term-limited. His son, Carlo, ran for his seat but lost to incumbent Councilor Ricardo Candido.

Pulilan Vice Mayoralty Election
Party	Candidate	Votes	%
PDP–Laban	Ricardo Candido	20,884	48.67
Liberal	Carlo Castillo	18,749	43.70
Independent	Liz Fajardo	3,274	7.63
Total votes		42,907	100
PDP–Laban gain from Liberal			

=== 2nd District ===
- Municipalities: Balagtas, Baliuag, Bocaue, Bustos, Guiguinto, Pandi, Plaridel

==== Balagtas ====
Incumbent Mayor Romeo "Romy" Castro is term-limited.

Balagtas Mayoralty Election
Party	Candidate	Votes	%
Liberal	Eladio Gonzales Jr.	16,952	48.87
NUP	Lito Polintan	9,284	26.76
PMP	Lito Galvez	4,528	13.05
UNA	Gina Estrella	3,926	11.32
Total votes		34,690	100
Liberal hold			

Incumbent Vice Mayor Emmanuel "Lito" Galvez was an unsuccessful candidate for mayor.

Balagtas Vice Mayoralty Election
Party	Candidate	Votes	%
Liberal	Alberto Carating II	12,564	37.72
Independent	Julius Abarzosa	10,588	31.79
NUP	Ariel Puatu	6,467	19.42
UNA	Pedy-K Kalalang	2,741	8.23
Independent	Jun Cruz	945	2.84
Total votes		33,305	100
Liberal gain from Independent			

==== Baliwag ====
Mayor Carolina Dellosa is the incumbent.

Baliuag Mayoralty Election
Party	Candidate	Votes	%
NPC	Ferdie Estrella	36,850	49.26
Liberal	Carolina Dellosa	33,258	44.46
Independent	Rolando Salvador	4,692	6.27
Total votes		74,800	100
NPC gain from Liberal			

Vice Mayor Christopher Clemente is the incumbent.

Baliuag Vice Mayoralty Election
Party	Candidate	Votes	%
Liberal	Christopher Clemente	43,785	62.46
NPC	Tony Patawaran	26,314	37.54
Total votes		70,019	100
Liberal hold			

==== Bocaue ====
Incumbent Eduardo "Jon-Jon" J. Villanueva, Jr. is term-limited; his sister Eleanor "Joni" J. Villanueva-Tugna will run in his place. Her main opponents are former Vice Mayor Jose Santiago, Jr. and former Bulacan Provincial Administrator Jim Valerio.

Villanueva won via coin toss, 3-0 in a best-of-five playoff, after she tied with Valerio who got 16,694 votes.

Bocaue Mayoralty Election
Party	Candidate	Votes	%
Liberal	Joni JJV Villanueva	16,694	34.52
Independent	Kuya Jim Valerio	16,694	34.52
NPC	Jonjon JJS Santiago	14,971	30.96
Total votes		48,359	100
Liberal hold			

Dioscoro (Coro) Juan, Jr. is the incumbent. His main opponent is the incumbent Councilor Aldrin (ABS) Sta. Ana.

Bocaue Vice Mayoralty Election
Party	Candidate	Votes	%
NPC	ABS Sta. Ana	19,763	43.12
Liberal	Dioscoro Juan Jr.	17,118	37.35
Independent	Ray Players Move Bautista	8,955	19.54
Total votes		45,836	100
NPC gain from Liberal			

==== Bustos ====
Mayor Arnel Mendoza is the incumbent.

Bustos Mayoralty Election
Party	Candidate	Votes	%
Liberal	Arnel Mendoza	21,161	68.43
NPC	Willy Cruz	9,763	31.57
Total votes		30,924	100
Liberal hold			

Vice Mayor Leonida (Loida) Rivera is the incumbent.

Bustos Vice Mayoralty Election
Party	Candidate	Votes	%
Liberal	Ading Leoncio	15,480	51.56
NPC	Loida Rivera	14,542	48.44
Total votes		30,022	100
Liberal gain from NPC			

==== Guiguinto ====
Mayor Ambrosio "Boy" Cruz, Jr. is the incumbent; his opponent was former Mayor Isagani "Gani" Pascual.

Guiguinto Mayoralty Election
Party	Candidate	Votes	%
Liberal	Ambrosio Cruz Jr.	25,932	53.11
NPC	Gani Pascual	22,891	46.89
Total votes		48,832	100
Liberal hold			

Vice Mayor Banjo Estrella is the incumbent; his opponent was former Vice Mayor Pute Aballa.

Guiguinto Vice Mayoralty Election
Party	Candidate	Votes	%
Liberal	Banjo Estrella	30,694	65.49
NPC	Pute Aballa	16,171	34.51
Total votes		46,865	100
Liberal hold			

==== Pandi ====
Mayor Enrico "Rico" Roque is the incumbent.

Pandi Mayoralty Election
Party	Candidate	Votes	%
KBL	Tinoy Marquez	20,064	54.06
NUP	Rico Roque	16,917	45.58
Independent	Egay Enriquez	136	0.37
Total votes		37,117	100
KBL gain from NUP			

Pandi Vice Mayoralty Election
Party	Candidate	Votes	%
KBL	Noel Roxas	18,808	52.57
Liberal	Ricky Roque	15,833	44.25
Independent	Ka Viceng Enriquez	1,137	3.18
Total votes		35,778	100
KBL hold			

==== Plaridel ====
Incumbent Mayor Jocell Vistan-Casaje is running unopposed.

Plaridel Mayoralty Election
Party	Candidate	Votes	%
Liberal	Jocell Vistan	36,313	100
Total votes		36,313	100
Liberal hold			

Plaridel Vice Mayoralty Election
Party	Candidate	Votes	%
Independent	Mhel de Leon	26,929	62.36
UNA	Eddie Salonga	16,256	37.64
Total votes		43,185	100
Independent hold			

=== 3rd District ===
- Municipalities: Angat, Doña Remedios Trinidad, Norzagaray, San Ildefonso, San Miguel, San Rafael

==== Angat ====
Leonardo (Narding) de Leon is the incumbent. His opponent is the incumbent Vice Mayor Reynante (Jowar) Bautista.

Angat Mayoralty Election
Party	Candidate	Votes	%
Liberal	Narding de Leon	14,828	51.10
NUP	Jowar Bautista	14,192	48.90
Total votes		29,020	100
Liberal hold			

Angat Vice Mayoralty Election
Party	Candidate	Votes	%
Liberal	Reggie Santos	18,047	64.48
NUP	William Vergel De Dios	9,943	35.52
Total votes		27,990	100
Liberal gain from NUP			

==== Doña Remedios Trinidad ====
Mayor Ronaldo (RTF) Flores is the incumbent.

Doña Remedios Trinidad Mayoralty Election
Party	Candidate	Votes	%
Liberal	RTF Flores	10,196	65.87
Independent	Jumong Piadozo	5,282	34.13
Total votes		15,478	100
Liberal hold			

Doña Remedios Trinidad Vice Mayoralty Election
Party	Candidate	Votes	%
Liberal	Larry Cruz	6,206	43.63
Independent	Liberato Sembrano	5,569	39.15
Independent	Lorna Carpio	2,449	17.22
Total votes		14,224	100%
Liberal gain from Independent			

==== Norzagaray ====
Mayor Alfredo (Fred) Germar is the incumbent; his opponent is the incumbent Vice Mayor Arthur Legaspi.

Norzagaray Mayoralty Election
Party	Candidate	Votes	%
Liberal	Fred Germar	29,861	64.76
KBL	Arthur Legaspi	16,249	35.24
Total votes		46,110	100
Liberal hold			

The main candidates for the Vice Mayoralty race are the incumbent Councilors Jun-Jun Saplala and Ade Cristobal.

Norzagaray Vice Mayoralty Election
Party	Candidate	Votes	%
Liberal	Ade Cristobal	22,831	50.72
KBL	Jun-jun Saplala	22,180	49.28
Total votes		45,011	100
Liberal gain from KBL			

==== San Ildefonso ====
Mayor Gerald Galvez is the incumbent.

San Ildefonso Mayoralty Election
Party	Candidate	Votes	%
NPC	Carla Galvez	28,249	50.89
Liberal	Gerald Galvez	27,262	49.11%
Total votes		55,511	100
NPC gain from Liberal			

San Ildefonso Vice Mayoralty Election
Party	Candidate	Votes	%
Liberal	Luis Sarrondo	23,249	44.56
NPC	Tess Miguel	17,651	33.83
Independent	Doc Eddie Velarde	11,273	21.61
Total votes		52,173	100
Liberal gain from NPC			

==== San Miguel ====
Due to the term limitation of incumbent Mayor Roderick DG. Tiongson, Municipal Administrator Ferdinand Tiongson took his luck to be the next Mayor. He opposed the Incumbent Vice Mayor Marivee Mendez-Coronel, who attempted to the first female Mayor of San Miguel, Bulacan. Other candidates were Mike Dela Cruz, son of former Mayor Juan Dela Cruz, and 2010 election candidate Allen Santos Dela Cruz.

San Miguel mayoralty election
Party	Candidate	Votes	%
Liberal	Ivy Mendez Coronel	20,440	30.17
UNA	Ferdie Tiongson	18,701	27.61
Independent	Allen dela Cruz	15,824	23.36
NPC	Mike dela Cruz	12,774	18.86
Total votes		67,739	100
Liberal gain from UNA			

San Miguel Vice Mayoralty Election
Party	Candidate	Votes	%
Liberal	Bong Alvarez	33,503	53.20
UNA	Josie Chico-Buan	18,769	29.80
NPC	Kirat Maniquis	10,703	17.00
Total votes		62,975	100
Liberal hold			

==== San Rafael ====
Incumbent Mayor Cipriano (Goto) Violago is running unopposed.

San Rafael Mayoralty Election
Party	Candidate	Votes	%
NUP	Goto Violago	35,605	100
Total votes		35,605	100
NUP hold			

Incumbent Vice Mayor Edison Veneracion is running unopposed.

San Rafael Vice Mayoralty Election
Party	Candidate	Votes	%
NUP	Edison Veneracion	33,515	100
Total votes		33,515	100
NUP hold			

=== 4th District ===
- Cities: Meycauayan
- Municipalities: Marilao, Obando, Santa Maria

==== Meycauayan City ====
Due to term limitation, Incumbent City Mayor Joan Alarilla is taking her luck to be the next House Representative of 4th District of Bulacan. Her daughter Judy is running for Mayor under the Nationalist People's Coalition and her opponent was Atty. Henry Villarica, the husband of Congresswoman Linabelle Villarica who is running under the Liberal Party. The other candidate is Pabling Milan, an independent candidate.

Meycauayan City Mayoralty Election
Party	Candidate	Votes	%
Liberal	Atorni Henry Villarica	67,588	73.45
NPC	Judy Alarilla	23,923	26.00
Independent	Pabling Milan	503	0.55
Total votes		92,014	100
Liberal gain from NPC			

Vice Mayor Jojo Manzano is the incumbent. His opponent is incumbent Councilor Mario (Barbell) Aguirre.

Meycauayan City Vice Mayoralty Election
Party	Candidate	Votes	%
Liberal	Jojo Manzano	61,385	70.53
NPC	Mario Barbell Aguirre	25,649	29.47
Total votes		87,034	100
Liberal hold			

==== Marilao ====
Mayor Juanito (Tito) Santiago is the incumbent.

Marilao Mayoralty Election
Party	Candidate	Votes	%
Independent	Juanito Santiago	55,336	89.88
Independent	Gerry Atienza Sr.	5,155	8.37
Independent	JM-Jun Montaos	1,077	1.75
Total votes		61,658	100
Independent hold			

Vice Mayor Andre Santos is the incumbent. His main opponents are incumbent Councilor Allane Sayo and Andre's former running mate, Barangay Lias Chairman Henry Lutao.

Marilao Vice Mayoralty Election
Party	Candidate	Votes	%
Independent	Henry Lutao	29,292	46.17
Liberal	Andre Santos	27,303	43.04
Independent	Allane Sayo	6,704	10.57
Independent	Lee Gabinay	143	0.23
Total votes		63,442	100
Independent gain from Liberal			

==== Obando ====
Mayor Edwin Santos is the incumbent; his opponent is former Mayor Orencio Gabriel.

Obando Mayoralty Election
Party	Candidate	Votes	%
UNA	Edwin Santos	13,610	53.22
Liberal	Orencio Gabriel	11,964	46.78
Total votes		25,574	100
UNA hold			

Vice Mayor Zoilito "Zoy" Santiago is the incumbent; his opponent is incumbent Councilor Arvin dela Cruz.

Obando Vice Mayoralty Election
Party	Candidate	Votes	%
Liberal	Kuya Arvin dela Cruz	13,501	54.46
UNA	Zoy Santiago	11,291	45.54
Total votes		24,792	100
Liberal gain from UNA			

==== Santa Maria ====
Incumbent Mayor Bartolome "Omeng" Ramos is term-limited; his son, Barangay Captain Raymond "Rejie" Ramos from Barangay Bagbaguin is his party's nominee. Main opponent for the Ramos' bid is former Vice Mayor Russel "Yoyoy" Pleyto.

Santa Maria Mayoralty Election
Party	Candidate	Votes	%
NPC	Yoyoy Pleyto	51,691	57.37
Liberal	Rejie Ramos	37,297	41.40
KBL	Ilao Gosilatar	1,106	1.23
Total votes		90,094	100
NPC gain from Liberal			

Vice Mayor Rico Jude Sto. Domingo is the incumbent; his main opponent is Barangay Captain Quirino (Ricky) Buenaventura from Barangay Pulong Buhangin.

Santa Maria Vice Mayoralty Election
Party	Candidate	Votes	%
NPC	Ricky Buenaventura	46,895	53.17
Liberal	Rico Sto. Domingo	37,721	42.77
KBL	Jaime Enriquez	3,582	4.06
Total votes		88,198	100
NPC gain from Liberal			

=== San Jose del Monte City ===
Mayor Reynaldo San Pedro is the incumbent; his main opponent is incumbent Lone District Representative Arthur Robes.

San Jose del Monte City Mayoralty Election
Party	Candidate	Votes	%
Liberal	Arthur Robes	83,148	50.16
NUP	Reynaldo San Pedro	81,672	49.27
Independent	Hadji Comendador	948	0.57
Total votes		165,768	100
Liberal gain from NUP			

Incumbent Vice Mayor Eduardo Roquero, Jr. is running for Lone District Representative. The main protagonists for Vice Mayoralty race are the top two incumbent City Councilors from First District: Efren Bartolome, Jr. and Janet Reyes.

San Jose del Monte City Vice Mayoralty Election
Party	Candidate	Votes	%
Liberal	Efren Bartolome Jr.	90,895	58.57
NUP	Janet Reyes	64,292	41.43
Total votes		155,187	100
Liberal gain from NUP			
