= 2019 San Jose del Monte local elections =

Philippine election

- May 13, 2019
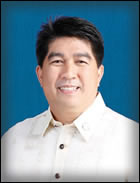
Nominee	Arthur Robes	Reynaldo San Pedro
Party	AR	PFP
Running mate	Efren Bartolome Jr.	N/A
Popular vote	98,808	74,402
Percentage	57.04%	42.95%
Mayor before election
Arthur Robes
Liberal
Elected mayor
Arthur Robes
AR

Local elections were held in San Jose del Monte, Bulacan on May 13, 2019 within the Philippine general election. The voters will elect for the elective local posts in the city: the congressman, the mayor, vice mayor, and six councilors in two districts.

== Background ==
List of certified candidates running for seats in San Jose del Monte.

Incumbent congresswoman Florida Robes is running for her second term under the banner of the PDP–Laban. Her opponent is incumbent councilor Irene del Rosario. Incumbent mayor Arthur Robes is running for his second term under the banner of his own party, Arangkada San Joseño. His opponent is former mayor Reynaldo San Pedro, who is running under the PFP.

== Results ==
=== Representative ===
Incumbent Congresswoman Florida Robes is running for her second term against incumbent councilor Irene del Rosario.

2019 Philippine House of Representatives election in San Jose del Monte, Bulacan's Lone District
Party	Candidate	Votes	%
PDP–Laban	Florida Robes	89,031	53.25
NUP	Irene del Rosario	78,135	46.74
Total votes		167,166	100
PDP–Laban hold			

=== Mayor ===
Incumbent Mayor Arthur Robes is running for his second term against former City Mayor Reynaldo San Pedro.

San Jose del Monte mayoral election
Party	Candidate	Votes	%
AR	Arthur Robes	98,808	57.04
PFP	Reynaldo San Pedro	74,402	42.95
Total votes		173,210	100
AR hold			

=== Vice Mayor ===
Incumbent Vice Mayor Efren Bartolome Jr. is running for his second term unopposed.

San Jose del Monte Vice mayoral election
Party	Candidate	Votes	%
AR	Efren Bartolome Jr.	143,478	100
Total votes		143,478	100
AR hold			

=== Sangguniang Panlungsod election ===
Election is via plurality-at-large voting: A voter votes for up to six candidates, then the six candidates with the highest number of votes are elected.

In the first district, incumbent councilors Richie Robes and Joey Abela is running for their third terms, while Noli Concepcion, Glenn Villano, Liezl Aguirre, and Ryan Santos is running for their second terms. In the second district, Benjie Acibal and Reypol Policarpio is running for their third terms, while Ryan Elfa and Argel Joseph Drio will run for their second terms. Incumbent councilor Irene del Rosario ran for the congressional seat while Eumir Samera ran for a board member seat.

==== 1st District ====
San Jose del Monte First District Sangguniang Panlungsod election
Party	Candidate	Votes	%
AR	Joey Abela	52,706	10.45
Makabayan	Janet Reyes	46,047	9.24
AR	Rosalyn Cabuco	45,512	9.11
AR	Glenn Villano	44,592	8.95
NUP	Liezl Aguirre	40,877	8.20
PFP	Richie Robes	39,866	8.00
AR	Nolly Concepcion	39,844	7.99
NUP	Ryan Santos	37,155	7.45
AR	Bandong Medina	34,395	6.90
AR	Melencio Garcia	32,776	6.57
NUP	Giovanny Capricho	25,954	5.20
PFP	John John delos Santos	24,790	4.97
PFP	Ryan Paul Pillas	18,089	3.63
Independent	Ferdinand del Rosario	10,135	2.03
Independent	Santiago de Leon	6,153	1.23
Total votes		498,161	100

==== 2nd District ====
San Jose del Monte Second District Sangguniang Panlungsod election
Party	Candidate	Votes	%
AR	Romeo Agapito	39,939	10.92
AR	Benjie Acibal	37,295	10.20
AR	Ryan Elfa	34,838	9.53
AR	Celso Francisco	33,586	9.18
PDP–Laban	Argel Joseph Drio	31,612	8.64
NUP	Vanessa Michelle Roquero	29,875	8.17
NUP	Reypol Policarpio	29,870	8.17
AR	Mario Batuigas	28,167	7.70
AR	Tita Beng Camua	24,411	6.67
PFP	Rafael Roco	21,001	5.74
NUP	Kriyel Matsumoto	15,241	4.16
PFP	George Tablan Jr.	11,569	3.16
Independent	Tony Geromiano	10,456	2.86
PFP	Sandy Galeza	9,807	2.68
Independent	Ladisla Felices	4,181	1.14
Independent	Ryan Arjona	3,713	1.01
Total votes		365,561	100
