= 2025 Bulacan local elections =

Elections in Bulacan

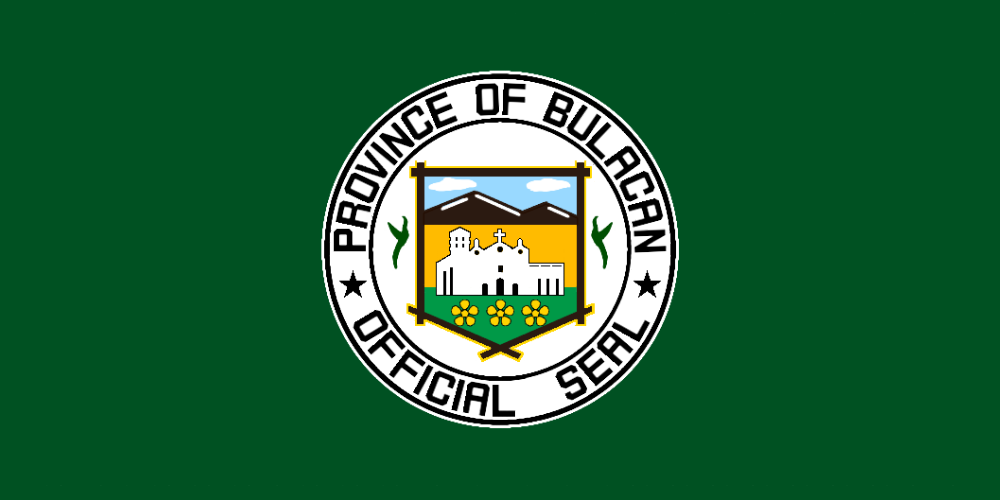
- May 12, 2025
- Registered: 2,173,026
- Turnout: 85.03%
- Gubernatorial election
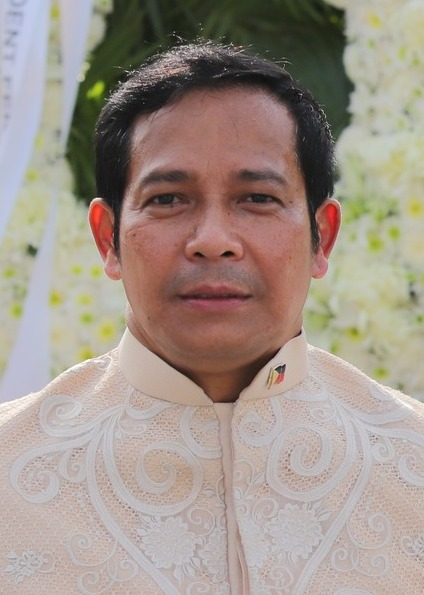

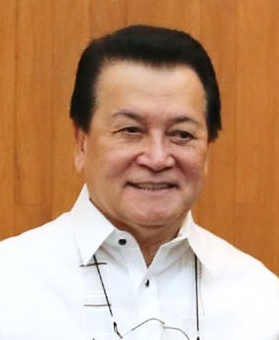
			PFP
Candidate	Daniel Fernando	Wilhelmino Sy-Alvarado	Bogs Violago
Party	NUP	Reporma	PFP
Running mate	Alex Castro	None	Elmer Paguio
Popular vote	1,177,893	227,914	226,204
Percentage	69.86	13.47	13.42
Governor before election
Daniel Fernando
NUP
Elected Governor
Daniel Fernando
NUP
- Vice gubernatorial election
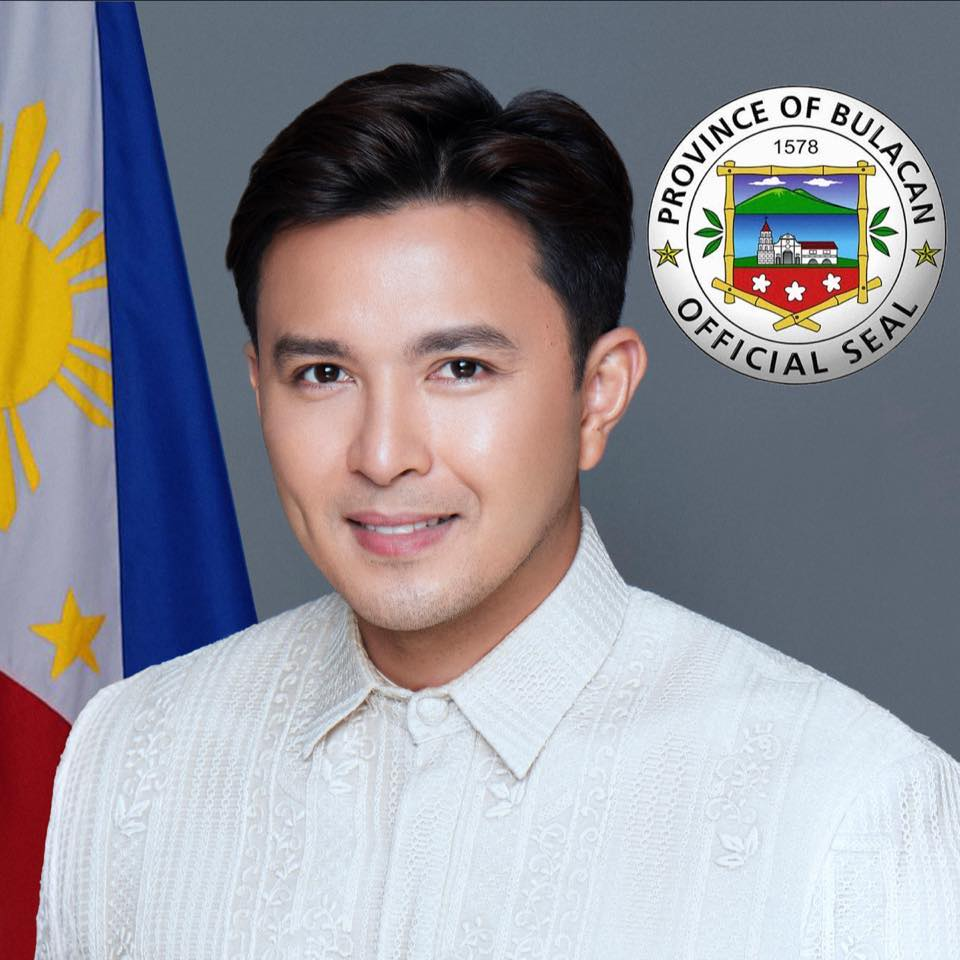
		PFP
Candidate	Alex Castro	Elmer Paguio
Party	NUP	PFP
Popular vote	1,360,020	154,644
Percentage	84.71	9.63
Vice Governor before election
Alex Castro
NUP
Elected Vice Governor
Alex Castro
NUP
- Provincial Board election
- 14 out of 18 seats in the Bulacan Provincial Board; 10 seats needed for a majority
Party	Vote %	Seats	+/–
NUP	46.38	8	+2
PFP	27.19	2	+2
Lakas	10.80	2	+2
Independent	8.90	1	0
AR	4.56	1	+1
This lists parties that won seats. See the complete results below.

Local elections were held in Bulacan on May 12, 2025, as part of the 2025 Philippine general election. Bulacan voters elected a governor, a vice governor, and 14 out of 18 members of the Bulacan Provincial Board.

== Governor ==
Incumbent Daniel Fernando (National Unity Party) ran for a third term. Fernando was re-elected with 61% of the vote in 2022. He ran against former Governor Wilhelmino Sy-Alvarado and former Meycauayan City vice mayor Bogs Violago.

Bulacan Gubernatorial Election
Party	Candidate	Votes	%
NUP	Daniel Fernando	1,177,893	69.86
Reporma	Wilhelmino Sy-Alvarado	227,914	13.47
PFP	Bogs Violago	226,204	13.42
Independent	Melissa Aquino	28,521	1.69
Independent	Kuya Jay Ocampo	13,685	0.81
Independent	Climate de Guzman	12,681	0.75
Total votes		1,686,718	100
NUP hold			

== Vice governor ==
Incumbent Alex Castro (National Unity Party) ran for a second term. Castro was elected with 48.37% of the vote in 2022.

Bulacan Vice gubernatorial election
Party	Candidate	Votes	%
NUP	Alex Castro	1,360,020	84.71
PFP	Elmer Paguio	154,644	9.63
Independent	Allan Villena	53,389	3.33
Independent	Efren Milanes	22,251	1.40
Independent	Manoy Tomagan	14,936	0.93
Total votes		1,605,910	100
NUP hold			

== Congressional elections ==
Each of Bulacan's six legislative districts and the lone district of San Jose del Monte elected each representative to the House of Representatives. The candidate with the highest number of votes wins the seat.

=== 1st District ===
Incumbent Representative Danilo Damingo ran for his second term against term-limited board member Allan Andan.

2025 Philippine House of Representatives election in Bulacan's 1st District
Party	Candidate	Votes	%
NUP	Danny Domingo	283,905	80.50
Aksyon	Allan Andan	64,753	18.36
Independent	Joselito Pinlac	4,035	1.14
Total votes		352,693	100
NUP hold			

=== 2nd District ===
Incumbent Tina Pancho ran for her second term as representative.

2025 Philippine House of Representatives election in Bulacan's 2nd District
Party	Candidate	Votes	%
NUP	Ditse Tina Pancho	167,236	94.25
Independent	Jimmy Villafuerte	10,195	5.75
Total votes		177,431	100
NUP hold			

=== 3rd District ===
Incumbent Lorna Silverio was term-limited and unable to run for a new term; her son, Victor, ran for her seat instead. He faced incumbent San Rafael mayor Cholo Violago.

2025 Philippine House of Representatives election in Bulacan's 3rd District
Party	Candidate	Votes	%
Lakas	Cholo Violago	146,672	60.51
NUP	Kuya Vic Silverio	94,631	39.04
Independent	JG Agojo	1,077	0.44
Total votes		242,380	100
Lakas gain from NUP			

=== 4th District ===
Incumbent Linabelle Villarica ran for her second term against Marilao councilor Andre Santos.

2025 Philippine House of Representatives election in Bulacan's 4th District
Party	Candidate	Votes	%
PFP	Linabelle Ruth Villarica	155,351	70.64
NUP	Andre Santos	43,012	19.56
Independent	Doc Abe Bordador	14,611	6.64
Independent	Demy Bautista	4,113	1.87
Independent	Ferdie Victolero	1,441	0.66
Independent	Pader Padernos	1,389	0.63
Total votes		219,217	100
PFP hold			

=== 5th District ===
Incumbent Ambrosio "Boy" Cruz did not run for a second term, instead switching places with his daughter, incumbent Guiguinto mayor Agay Cruz.

2025 Philippine House of Representatives election in Bulacan's 5th District
Party	Candidate	Votes	%
Lakas	Agay Cruz	188,973	85.11
Independent	Vic Fernando	33,051	14.89
Total votes		222,024	100
Lakas hold			

=== 6th District ===
Incumbent Salvador Pleyto ran unopposed for his second term as representative, after his opponent, Jad Racal, was declared by COMELEC as a nuisance candidate.

2025 Philippine House of Representatives election in Bulacan's 6th District
Party	Candidate	Votes	%
Lakas	Ador Pleyto	164,503	100
Total votes		164,503	100
Lakas hold			

=== San Jose del Monte ===
Incumbent Florida Robes was term-limited and ran for city mayor instead; her husband, incumbent mayor Arthur, ran for her seat.

2025 Philippine House of Representatives election in San Jose del Monte's Lone District
Party	Candidate	Votes	%
Lakas	Arthur Robes	170,741	74.37
Liberal	Dan Florentino	58,845	25.63
Total votes		229,586	100
Lakas hold			

== Provincial Board ==
All 6 Districts of Bulacan, along with the lone district of San Jose del Monte, elected members of the Bulacan Provincial Board. All districts send two board members each. Election was via plurality-at-large voting; a voter can vote up to the maximum number of board members his district sends.

Since a Supreme Court ruling in 2023 on provincial board representation for component cities that have their own legislative districts, the Bulacan Provincial Board is composed of 18 board members, 14 of whom are elected.

=== Overview ===
Party	Votes	%	Seats
National Unity Party	1,217,038	46.38	8
Partido Federal ng Pilipinas	713,648	27.19	2
Lakas–CMD	283,307	10.80	2
Independent	233,665	8.90	1
Arangkada San Joseño	119,693	4.56	1
Nationalist People's Coalition	52,766	2.01	0
Bunyog Party	4,085	0.16	0
Ex officio seats			3
Reserved seats			1
Total	2,624,202	100.00	18

=== 1st provincial district ===
Bulacan's 1st provincial district consists of the same area as Bulacan's 1st legislative district. Two board members are elected from this provincial district.

Incumbent Board Member Allan Andan was term-limited, and ran for representative instead; incumbent Mina Fermin ran for her second term.

2025 Provincial Board Election in 1st District of Bulacan
Party	Candidate	Votes	%
NUP	Ninong Michael Aquino	126,653	22.81
Independent	Mina Fermin	122,271	22.02
PFP	Ayee Ople	102,696	18.50
PFP	Atorni Niño Bautista	93,403	16.82
NPC	Noel Sacay	52,766	9.50
NUP	James Santos	43,573	7.85
Independent	Bong Laderas	8,530	1.54
Independent	Ryan Abueg	5,301	0.95
Total votes		555,193	100

=== 2nd provincial district ===
Bulacan's 2nd provincial district consists of the same area as Bulacan's 2nd legislative district. Two board members are elected from this provincial district.

Incumbent Board Members Pechay dela Cruz and Dingdong Nicolas ran for their third and second terms, respectively.

2025 Provincial Board Election in 2nd District of Bulacan
Party	Candidate	Votes	%
NUP	Pechay dela Cruz	99,290	35.61
NUP	Dingdong Nicolas	84,464	30.29
PFP	Ate Charm Clemente	62,829	22.53
PFP	Glenn Vistan	25,583	9.17
Independent	Vino Andal	6,697	2.40
Total votes		278,863	100

=== 3rd provincial district ===
Bulacan's 3rd provincial district consists of the same area as Bulacan's 3rd legislative district. Two board members are elected from this provincial district.

Incumbent Board Member Nono Castro was running for his third and final term; incumbent Board Member Aye Mariano was running for his second term.

2025 Provincial Board Election in 3rd District of Bulacan
Party	Candidate	Votes	%
NUP	Aye Mariano	120,479	34.47
NUP	RC Nono Castro	115,088	32.92
Lakas	Emily Viceo	73,726	21.09
PFP	John Mendez	36,651	10.48
Independent	Dolfo Delfin	3,616	1.03
Total votes		349,560	100

=== 4th provincial district ===
Bulacan's 4th provincial district consists of the same area as Bulacan's 4th legislative district. The city of San Jose del Monte used to be included in this provincial district until a Supreme Court ruling in 2023 created a separate provincial district for the city. Two board members are elected from this provincial district.

2025 Provincial Board Election in 4th District of Bulacan
Party	Candidate	Votes	%
PFP	Kat Hernandez	123,412	34.55
PFP	William Villarica	109,775	30.73
NUP	Babes San Andres	53,063	14.86
NUP	Jojo Manzano	52,995	14.84
Independent	Lito Alcaraz	17,945	5.02
Total votes		357,190	100

=== 5th provincial district ===
Bulacan's 5th provincial district consists of the same area as Bulacan's 5th legislative district. Two board members are elected from this provincial district.

Incumbent Board Members Ricky Roque and Teta Mendoza ran for their second terms.

2025 Provincial Board Election in 5th District of Bulacan
Party	Candidate	Votes	%
NUP	Ricky Roque	139,505	41.98
NUP	Teta Mendoza	134,412	40.45
PFP	Kap Neil Tuazon	34,072	10.25
Independent	Ruben Tubig Hipolito	24,286	7.31
Total votes		332,275	100

=== 6th provincial district ===
Bulacan's 6th provincial district consists of the same area as Bulacan's 6th legislative district. Two board members are elected from this provincial district.

Incumbent Board Members Jay de Guzman and Art Legaspi ran for their second terms.

2025 Provincial Board Election in 6th District of Bulacan
Party	Candidate	Votes	%
Lakas	Jay de Guzman	112,752	32.02
Lakas	Art Legaspi	96,829	27.50
PFP	Marisa Tuazon	83,655	23.76
PFP	Mary Jane Garcia	24,141	6.86
Independent	Doc Lino Lopez	18,398	5.22
Independent	Angel ng Bayan Barcial	16,354	4.64
Total votes		352,129	100

=== San Jose del Monte ===
Following a Supreme Court ruling in 2023, a provincial district was created for the city of San Jose del Monte, which used to be under the 4th provincial district. Two board members are elected from this provincial district.

Incumbent Board Members Jon-jon delos Santos and Allen Baluyut ran for their third and second terms, respectively.

2025 Provincial Board Election in San Jose del Monte's Lone District
Party	Candidate	Votes	%
NUP	Jon-jon delos Santos	150,327	37.68
AR	Efren Bartolome Jr.	119,693	30.00
NUP	Allen Baluyut	97,189	24.36
PFP	Owesa Joy Osea	17,431	4.37
Independent	Luis Bastaliño	10,267	2.57
Bunyog	Kabunyog Culex Soliman	4,085	1.02
Total votes		398,992	100

== City and Municipal elections ==
The candidates for mayor and vice mayor with the highest number of votes wins the seat; they are voted separately, therefore, they may be of different parties when elected.

=== 1st District ===
- City: Malolos
- Municipalities: Bulakan, Calumpit, Hagonoy, Paombong, Pulilan

==== Malolos ====
Incumbent City Mayor Christian Natividad ran for his second term unopposed.

Malolos mayoral election
Party	Candidate	Votes	%
NUP	Christian Agila Natividad	97,706	100
Total votes		97,706	100
NUP hold			

Incumbent City Vice Mayor Migs Bautista ran for his second term against former mayor Bebong Gatchalian and 3 Term Councilor Kiko Castro.

Malolos City vice mayoral election
Party	Candidate	Votes	%
Independent	Bebong Gatchalian	47,905	43.38
NUP	Migs Tengco Bautista	37,264	33.74
Independent	Kiko Castro	25,271	22.88
Total votes		110,440	100
Independent gain from NUP			

==== Bulakan ====
Incumbent Mayor Vergel Meneses was running for his third and final term against former mayor Patrick Neil Meneses.

Bulakan mayoral election
Party	Candidate	Votes	%
NPC	Vergel Meneses	26,967	58.33
PFP	Patrick Neil Meneses	18,612	40.26
PM	Ramil Armildez	649	1.40
Total votes		46,228	100
NPC hold			

Incumbent Vice Mayor Aika Sanchez ran for her second term against then ally for councilor, Aron Cruz.

Bulakan vice mayoral election
Party	Candidate	Votes	%
PFP	Aron Ronald Cruz	26,580	58.60
NPC	Aika Sanchez	18,779	41.40
Total votes		45,359	100
PFP gain from NPC			

==== Calumpit ====
Incumbent Mayor Lem Faustino was running for her second term against former vice mayor Aboy de Belen.

Calumpit mayoral election
Party	Candidate	Votes	%
NUP	Lem Faustino	33,141	54.56
PFP	DRC Cora de Jesus-Josue	22,705	37.38
Aksyon	Aboy de Belen	4,900	8.07
Total votes		60,746	100
NUP hold			

Incumbent Vice Mayor Zar Candelaria ran for his second term.

Calumpit vice mayoral election
Party	Candidate	Votes	%
NUP	Doc Zar Candelaria	34,891	60.32
PFP	Alex Manio	22,955	39.68
Total votes		57,846	100
NUP hold			

==== Hagonoy ====
Incumbent Mayor Baby Manlapaz did not seek re-election; her husband, former mayor Amboy, ran in her place. Among his opponents were incumbent Vice Mayor Charo Sy-Alvarado, councilor Tina Perez and former councilor candidate and barangay captain Kenneth Bautista.

Hagonoy mayoral election
Party	Candidate	Votes	%
Lakas	Ate Charo Sy-Alvarado	25,368	38.52
NPC	Tina Perez	22,662	34.41
PFP	Amboy Manlapaz	13,248	20.11
NUP	Kap Kenneth Bautista	4,584	6.96
Total votes		65,862	100
Lakas gain from PFP			

Incumbent Vice Mayor Charo Sy-Alvarado ran for the mayoralty post, and has nominated councilor Millord Cruz for her seat. He faced former mayoral candidate Jhane dela Cruz, barangay captain Mila Lacap and Lawyer Mildred "Dred" Ople, a relative of former Senator Blas Ople, former DMW Secretary Susan "Toots" Ople and former Mayor Felix "Toti" Ople.

Hagonoy vice mayoral election
Party	Candidate	Votes	%
PFP	Jhane dela Cruz	28,178	44.41
Lakas	Coach Millord Cruz	15,404	24.28
NUP	Atty. Dred Ople	14,015	22.09
NPC	Kap Mila Lacap	5,859	9.23
Total votes		63,456	100
PFP gain from Lakas			

==== Paombong ====
Incumbent Mayor Ann Marcos was term-limited and unable to run for a new term; her son, Mac, ran in her place instead. He faced incumbent Vice Mayor Emelita Yunson.

Paombong mayoral election
Party	Candidate	Votes	%
NUP	Mac Marcos	14,872	48.97
PFP	Ate Ems Yunson	11,149	36.71
Independent	Gary Valencia	4,347	14.31
Total votes		30,268	100
NUP hold			

Incumbent Vice Mayor Emelita Yunson ran as Mayor. The vice mayoralty post was contested between incumbent councilors JC Castro and Marcy Ong.

Paombong vice mayoral election
Party	Candidate	Votes	%
PFP	JC Castro	19,637	66.72
NUP	Marcy Ong	9,794	33.28
Total votes		29,431	100
PFP hold			

==== Pulilan ====
Incumbent Mayor Maritz Montejo was term-limited and unable to run for a new term; she nominated municipal ABC chairman Dennis Cruz for her post. His opponents were incumbent Vice Mayor RJ Peralta, former vice mayor Elpidio Castillo's son Doc Carlo Castillo, and independent candidate Tramo Borlongan.

Pulilan mayoral election
Party	Candidate	Votes	%
Lakas	RJ Peralta	24,211	41.61
PFP	Doc Carlo Castillo	20,005	34.38
NUP	ABC Dennis Cruz	13,569	23.32
Independent	Tramo Borlongan	399	0.69
Total votes		58,184	100
Lakas gain from NUP			

Incumbent Vice Mayor RJ Peralta ran as Mayor; his party selected Atty. Imee Cruz as their Vice Mayoralty candidate. Cruz's opponents were former vice mayor Rec Candido and incumbent councilor Atorni Gilbert Muñoz.

Pulilan vice mayoral election
Party	Candidate	Votes	%
Lakas	Atty. Imee Cruz	29,186	50.91
PFP	Atorni Gilbert Muñoz	14,726	25.69
NUP	Rec Candido	13,413	23.40
Total votes		57,325	100
Lakas hold			

=== 2nd District ===
- City: Baliwag
- Municipalities: Bustos, Plaridel

==== Baliwag ====
Incumbent Mayor Ferdie Estrella was term-limited and ran as vice mayor instead; his mother, Sonia, ran for his post. Among her opponents were incumbent Vice Mayor Madette Quimpo, former vice mayor Cris Clemente, and former mayor Lando Salvador.

Baliwag mayoral election
Party	Candidate	Votes	%
NUP	Mommy Sonia Estrella	45,232	47.17
PFP	Madette Quimpo	39,907	41.62
Independent	Cris Clemente	6,941	7.24
Aksyon	Lando Salvador	3,524	3.68
Independent	Lee Alvarez	141	0.15
Independent	Froilan Carrillo	137	0.14
Total votes		95,882	100
NUP hold			

Incumbent Vice Mayor Madette Quimpo ran for Mayor instead. The Vice Mayoralty race was disputed by incumbent Mayor Ferdie Estrella and councilor Mabel Pascual.

Baliwag vice mayoral election
Party	Candidate	Votes	%
NUP	Ferdie Estrella	55,939	59.50
PFP	Mabel Pascual	34,720	36.93
Aksyon	Darylle Salvador	3,352	3.57
Total votes		94,011	100
NUP gain from PFP			

==== Bustos ====
Incumbent Mayor Francis "Iskul" Juan was running for his third and final term against former mayor Arnel Mendoza and former vice mayor Loida Rivera.

Bustos mayoral election
Party	Candidate	Votes	%
NUP	Iskul Juan	26,344	61.85
Independent	Arnel Mendoza	10,505	24.66
Independent	Loida Rivera	5,745	13.49
Total votes		42,594	100
NUP hold			

Incumbent Vice Mayor Martin Angeles ran for his second term against councilor Niña Perez.

Bustos vice mayoral election
Party	Candidate	Votes	%
NUP	Martin Angeles	24,732	57.81
PFP	Ka-Unlad Niña Perez	18,047	42.19
Total votes		42,779	100
NUP hold			

==== Plaridel ====
Incumbent Mayor Jocell Vistan ran for her second term.

Plaridel mayoral election
Party	Candidate	Votes	%
NUP	Ate Jocell Vistan	41,290	75.35
PFP	Atty. James San Diego	13,511	24.65
Total votes		54,801	100
NUP hold			

Incumbent Vice Mayor Lorie Vinta ran for her second term against former vice mayor Mhel de Leon.

Plaridel vice mayoral election
Party	Candidate	Votes	%
Independent	Mhel de Leon	37,742	68.51
NUP	Lorie Vinta	17,344	31.49
Total votes		55,086	100
Independent gain from NUP			

=== 3rd District ===
- Municipalities: Doña Remedios Trinidad, San Ildefonso, San Miguel, San Rafael

==== Doña Remedios Trinidad ====
Incumbent Mayor Ronaldo Flores ran for his second term.

Doña Remedios Trinidad mayoral election
Party	Candidate	Votes	%
NUP	RTF Flores	16,995	73.61
PFP	Jumong Piadozo	6,093	26.39
Total votes		23,088	100
NUP hold			

Incumbent Vice Mayor Marie Flores ran for her second term.

Doña Remedios Trinidad vice mayoral election
Party	Candidate	Votes	%
NUP	Marie Flores	15,993	71.89
PFP	Lowel Sembrano	6,252	28.11
Total votes		22,245	100
NUP hold			

==== San Ildefonso ====
Incumbent Mayor Gazo Galvez was running for his second term against incumbent vice mayor Rocky Sarmiento.

San Ildefonso mayoral election
Party	Candidate	Votes	%
NUP	Gazo Galvez	46,862	61.49
PFP	Rocky Galvez Sarmiento	29,351	38.51
Total votes		76,213	100
NUP hold			

Incumbent Vice Mayor Rocky Sarmiento ran for mayor instead; his party nominated former mayor Carla Galvez-Tan for his seat. She faced Municipal Administrator Chariz Galvez-Cabande.

San Ildefonso vice mayoral election
Party	Candidate	Votes	%
NUP	Admin Chariz Galvez	40,680	53.89
PFP	Carla Galvez	34,802	46.11
Total votes		75,482	100
NUP gain from PFP			

==== San Miguel ====
Incumbent Mayor Roderick Tiongson ran for his third and final term against incumbent vice mayor Bong Alvarez.

San Miguel mayoral election
Party	Candidate	Votes	%
Lakas	Bong Alvarez	29,718	33.95
Aksyon	Kuya Jiboy Cabochan	27,806	31.77
PFP	Erick Tiongson	26,647	30.45
NUP	Antonio Ligon	3,063	3.50
Independent	Brod Domingo	291	0.33
Total votes		87,525	100
Lakas gain from PFP			

Incumbent Vice Mayor Bong Alvarez was term-limited and ran as mayor instead. His post was disputed between incumbent councilors Mimio Dizon and Jhong Reyes.

San Miguel vice mayoral election
Party	Candidate	Votes	%
NUP	Jhong Reyes	34,681	40.82
NPC	Kap Konsi Melvin Santos	25,691	30.24
PFP	Mimio Dizon	20,211	23.79
Independent	Eric Lim Espiritu	4,388	5.16
Total votes		84,971	100
NUP gain from NPC			

==== San Rafael ====
Incumbent Mayor Cholo Violago did not seek re-election and ran as representative instead; his father, former mayor Goto, ran in his place unopposed.

San Rafael mayoral election
Party	Candidate	Votes	%
PFP	Goto Violago	46,569	100
Total votes		46,569	100
PFP hold			

Incumbent Vice Mayor Lyn Veneracion did not seek re-election; her husband Edison ran in her place unopposed.

San Rafael vice mayoral election
Party	Candidate	Votes	%
PFP	Edison Veneracion	45,486	100
Total votes		45,486	100
PFP hold			

=== 4th District ===
- Cities: Meycauayan
- Municipalities: Marilao, Obando

==== Meycauayan ====
Incumbent Mayor Henry Villarica ran for his second term against councilor Mariposa Cabigquez.

Meycauayan mayoral election
Party	Candidate	Votes	%
PFP	Atorni Henry Villarica	91,601	82.62
NUP	Mariposa Cabigquez	19,275	17.38
Total votes		110,876	100
PFP hold			

After running unopposed for two elections, incumbent Vice Mayor Jojie Violago ran for her third and last term against Manny Alarilla, the son of former mayor Joan Alarilla.

Meycauayan vice mayoral election
Party	Candidate	Votes	%
PFP	Jojie Violago	63,355	59.32
NUP	Manny Alarilla	43,456	40.68
Total votes		106,811	100
PFP hold			

==== Marilao ====
Incumbent Mayor Henry Lutao, who succeeded former mayor Ricky Silvestre after his death, ran for his full term against his predecessor's former opponent, Atty. Jem Sy.

Marilao mayoral election
Party	Candidate	Votes	%
PFP	Atty. Jem Sy	66,548	66.52
NUP	Henry Lutao	32,517	32.50
PM	Mel Cayabyab	981	0.98
Total votes		100,046	100
PFP gain from NUP			

Incumbent Vice Mayor Bob dela Cruz was running for his full term against incumbent councilor Ariel Amador.

Marilao vice mayoral election
Party	Candidate	Votes	%
PFP	Ariel Amador	44,459	45.99
NUP	Bob dela Cruz	38,429	39.75
Lakas	Joel Ventura	13,783	14.26
Total votes		96,671	100
PFP gain from NUP			

==== Obando ====
Incumbent Mayor Ding Valeda ran for his second term against incumbent vice mayor Arvin dela Cruz and former mayor Edwin Santos.

Obando mayoral election
Party	Candidate	Votes	%
PFP	Ding Valeda	14,967	54.54
Independent	Dok Mike Raymundo	5,575	20.32
NUP	Kuya Arvin dela Cruz	4,723	17.21
PDP–Laban	Edwin Santos	1,521	5.54
Independent	Telong Dioquino	655	2.39
Total votes		27,441	100
PFP hold			

Incumbent Vice Mayor Arvin Dela Cruz was term-limited and ran as mayor instead; his party nominated councilor Aries Manalaysay for his post. He was up against fellow councilor Rowell Rillera and two other candidates.

Obando vice mayoral election
Party	Candidate	Votes	%
PFP	Rowell Rillera	16,508	61.96
PDP–Laban	Narciso JR Go	5,103	19.15
NUP	Aries Manalaysay	4,486	16.84
Independent	Myra Cruz	548	2.06
Total votes		26,645	100
PFP gain from NUP			

=== 5th District ===
- Municipalities: Balagtas, Bocaue, Guiguinto, Pandi

==== Balagtas ====
Incumbent Mayor JR Gonzales was term-limited and ran for councilor instead; his party nominated incumbent Vice Mayor Ariel Valderama for the post. He faced Andy Santiago.

Balagtas mayoral election
Party	Candidate	Votes	%
PFP	Andy Andrews Santiago	28,159	59.05
NUP	Ariel Valderama	19,526	40.95
Total votes		47,685	100
PFP gain from NUP			

Incumbent Vice Mayor Ariel Valderama ran for mayor, and his party nominated former vice mayor Alberto Carating II for his post. He faced councilor Monay Payuran.

Balagtas Vice mayoral election
Party	Candidate	Votes	%
PFP	Monay Payuran	27,204	58.46
NUP	Bobby Carating	19,330	41.54
Total votes		46,534	100
PFP gain from NUP			

==== Bocaue ====
Incumbent mayor Eduardo "Jonjon" Villanueva Jr. ran for his second term against incumbent councilor Aldrin Sta. Ana.

In January 2025, the Supreme Court issued a temporary restraining order (TRO) in favor of Sta. Ana against his disqualification by the COMELEC.

Bocaue mayoral election
Party	Candidate	Votes	%
NUP	Jonjon JJV Villanueva	38,130	62.59
Independent	ABS Sta. Ana	18,032	29.60
Independent	Teacher MJ Pornasdoro	4,757	7.81
Total votes		60,919	100
NUP hold			

Incumbent vice mayor Sherwin Tugna ran for his second term unopposed. He appeared on the ballot with the alias "Mr. Mayor Joni" for being the widower of late mayor Joni Villanueva.

Bocaue vice mayoral election
Party	Candidate	Votes	%
NUP	Mr. Mayor Joni Tugna	53,889	100
Total votes		53,889	100
NUP hold			

==== Guiguinto ====
Incumbent Mayor Agay Cruz switched places with her father, incumbent representative Boy, who ran unopposed for mayor.

Guiguinto mayoral election
Party	Candidate	Votes	%
Lakas	Boy Cruz	47,775	100
Total votes		47,775	100
Lakas hold			

Incumbent Vice Mayor Banjo Estrella ran for his second term against former vice mayor JJ Santos.

Guiguinto vice mayoral election
Party	Candidate	Votes	%
Independent	JJ Santos	43,933	71.04
Lakas	Banjo Estrella	17,912	28.96
Total votes		61,845	100
Independent gain from Lakas			

==== Pandi ====
Incumbent Mayor Rico Roque ran for his third and final term against incumbent councilor Kat Marquez-Anastacio.

Pandi mayoral election
Party	Candidate	Votes	%
NUP	Rico Roque	60,270	69.54
PFP	Darna Kat Marquez	26,404	30.46
Total votes		86,674	100
NUP hold			

Incumbent Vice Mayor Lui Sebastian ran for her third and final term.

Pandi vice mayoral election
Party	Candidate	Votes	%
PFP	Engr. Cris Castro	45,408	53.08
NUP	Lui Sebastian	40,145	46.92
Total votes		85,553	100
PFP gain from NUP			

=== 6th District ===
- Municipalities: Angat, Norzagaray, Santa Maria

==== Angat ====
Incumbent Mayor Jowar Bautista was running for his second term against former mayor Narding de Leon.

On January 5, 2025, de Leon died due to a heart attack.

Angat mayoral election
Party	Candidate	Votes	%
Lakas	Jowar Bautista	18,892	50.35
NUP	Narding de Leon	18,633	49.65
Total votes		37,525	100
Lakas hold			

Incumbent Vice Mayor Arvin Agustin ran for a second term against incumbent councilor Oca Suarez.

On February 2, 2025, Suarez also died, a month after de Leon.

Angat vice mayoral election
Party	Candidate	Votes	%
Lakas	Arvin Agustin	21,797	62.20
NUP	Oca Suarez	13,247	37.80
Total votes		35,044	100
Lakas hold			

==== Norzagaray ====
Incumbent Mayor Merlyn Germar ran for her second term against former acting mayor Ade Cristobal.

Norzagaray mayoral election
Party	Candidate	Votes	%
NUP	Merlyn Germar	43,263	66.10
PFP	Ade Cristobal	22,187	33.90
Total votes		65,450	100
NUP hold			

Incumbent Vice Mayor Baldo Gener ran for his second term against incumbent councilor Giulius Samson.

Norzagaray vice mayoral election
Party	Candidate	Votes	%
PFP	Giulius Samson	34,283	53.12
Lakas	Baldo Gener	30,258	46.88
Total votes		64,541	100
PFP gain from Lakas			

==== Santa Maria ====
Incumbent Mayor Omeng Ramos ran for his second term against former vice mayor Ricky Buenaventura.

Santa Maria mayoral election
Party	Candidate	Votes	%
Lakas	Omeng Ramos	79,249	60.17
PFP	Ricky Buenaventura	50,807	38.58
Independent	Jose Mangulabnan	1,653	1.26
Total votes		131,709	100
Lakas hold			

Incumbent Vice Mayor Eboy Juan ran for his second term against former councilor Obet Perez.

Santa Maria vice mayoral election
Party	Candidate	Votes	%
PFP	Obet Perez	65,665	50.42
Lakas	Eboy Juan	62,292	47.83
Independent	Nelson dela Merced	2,270	1.74
Total votes		130,227	100
PFP gain from Lakas			

=== San Jose del Monte City ===
Incumbent City Mayor Arthur Robes was term-limited and ran as representative instead; his wife, Florida, ran in his place. She faced 2nd district councilor Romeo Agapito and Atty. Earl Tan.

San Jose del Monte mayoral election
Party	Candidate	Votes	%
PFP	Ate Rida Robes	126,920	51.39
Independent	Atty. Earl Tan	86,931	35.20
Liberal	Aga Agapito	33,141	13.42
Total votes		246,992	100
PFP hold			

Incumbent City Vice Mayor Efren Bartolome Jr. was term-limited and ran for board member; his sister, Arlene, ran for his seat. She faced incumbent councilor Janet Reyes and former councilor Irene del Rosario.

San Jose del Monte vice mayoral election
Party	Candidate	Votes	%
AR	Arlene ABA Bartolome	87,916	36.75
Independent	Irene del Rosario	79,570	33.26
NUP	Janet Reyes	59,129	24.71
PDP–Laban	Paul Pillas	9,744	4.07
Independent	Flor Acmad	2,892	1.21
Total votes		239,251	100
AR hold			
