= 2019 Bulacan local elections =

Local election cycle

2019 Bulacan gubernatorial election
- May 13, 2019
- Registered: 1,863,596
- Turnout: 77.69%
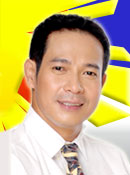

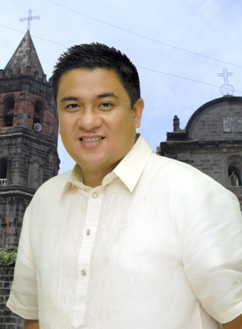
Nominee	Daniel Fernando	Christian "Agila" Natividad	Teddy "Aguila" Natividad
Party	NUP	PDP–Laban	Lakas
Running mate	Wilhelmino Sy-Alvarado	Anjo Mendoza	N/A
Popular vote	706,903	406,366	159,371
Percentage	54.38	31.26	12.26
Governor before election
Wilhelmino Sy-Alvarado
NUP
Elected Governor
Daniel Fernando
NUP

Bulacan local elections were held on May 13, 2019, as part of the 2019 Philippine general election. Voters selected their candidates of choice for all local positions: a town mayor, vice mayor and town councilors, as well as members of the Sangguniang Panlalawigan, the vice-governor, governor and representatives for the four districts of Bulacan and the lone district of San Jose del Monte City.

== Gubernatorial and Vice Gubernatorial election ==
List of certified candidates.

=== Governor ===
Incumbent Governor Wilhelmino Sy-Alvarado was term-limited; he switched places with incumbent Vice-Governor Daniel Fernando, who ran for governor. Fernando's opponents are incumbent Malolos mayor Christian "Agila" Natividad and former councilor Teddy "Aguila" Natividad.

Bulacan Gubernatorial Election
Party	Candidate	Votes	%
NUP	Daniel Fernando	706,903	54.37
PDP–Laban	Agila Natividad	406,366	31.25
Lakas	Aguila Teddy Natividad	159,371	12.25
Independent	Joel Coronel	8,401	0.64
Independent	Kuya Jay Ocampo	5,919	0.45
Independent	Ermalyn G. del Carmen	4,852	0.37
LM	Larry dela Merced	4,582	0.35
Independent	Kaka Balite	3,596	0.27
Total votes		1,299,990	100
NUP hold			

=== Vice Governor ===
Incumbent Vice-Governor Daniel Fernando was term-limited; he switched places with incumbent Governor Wilhelmino Sy-Alvarado, who ran for Vice-Governor. Asiong Mendiola, the running mate of Teddy Natividad, withdrew his candidacy. Sy-Alvarado's opponents were Nelson dela Merced and incumbent Bocaue councilor Anjo Mendoza, son of former Bulacan governor Joselito Mendoza.

Bulacan Vice gubernatorial election
Party	Candidate	Votes	%
NUP	Wilhelmino Sy-Alvarado	812,859	64.48
PDP–Laban	Anjo Mendoza	426,006	33.79
Independent	Nelson dela Merced	21,668	1.71
Total votes		1,260,533	100
NUP hold			

== Congressional elections ==
=== 1st District ===
Incumbent Jose Antonio Sy-Alvarado ran for his second term.

2019 Philippine House of Representatives election in Bulacan's 1st District
Party	Candidate	Votes	%
NUP	Kuya Jose AR. Sy-Alvarado	205,400	74.55
PDP–Laban	Sander Tantoco	59,582	21.62
Lakas	Sanbon Tantoco	10,504	3.81
Total votes		275,486	100
NUP hold			

=== 2nd District ===
Incumbent Gavini "Apol" Pancho ran for his third term.

2019 Philippine House of Representatives election in Bulacan's 2nd District
Party	Candidate	Votes	%
NUP	Apol Pancho	287,118	93.16
Independent	Jimmy Villafuerte	11,900	3.86
Independent	Raffy Avila	9,178	2.97
Total votes		308,196	100
NUP hold			

=== 3rd District ===
Incumbent Lorna Silverio ran for her second term. She faced former Governor and 3rd District Representative Joselito Andrew Mendoza and her late husband's son Ricardo S. Silverio Jr.

2019 Philippine House of Representatives election in Bulacan's 3rd District
Party	Candidate	Votes	%
NUP	Lorna Silverio	135,830	51.57
PDP–Laban	Jonjon Mendoza	103,505	39.30
PMP	Ricardo Silverio Jr.	22,630	8.59
Independent	Allan Villena	1,374	0.52
Total votes		263,339	100
NUP hold			

=== 4th District ===
Incumbent Linabelle Ruth Villarica was term-limited; she ran as City Mayor of Meycauayan instead. Her husband, incumbent Meycauayan City Mayor Henry Villarica ran unopposed for her seat.

2019 Philippine House of Representatives election in Bulacan's 4th District
Party	Candidate	Votes	%
PDP–Laban	Atorni Henry Villarica	191,992	100
Total votes		191,992	100
PDP–Laban hold			

=== San Jose del Monte ===
Incumbent Florida Robes ran for her second term, and won against incumbent councilor Irene del Rosario with a margin of 10,896 votes (6.52%).

2019 Philippine House of Representatives election in San Jose del Monte, Bulacan's Lone District
Party	Candidate	Votes	%
PDP–Laban	Florida Robes	89,031	53.25
NUP	Irene del Rosario	78,135	46.74
Total votes		167,166	100
PDP–Laban hold			

== Sangguniang Panlalawigan Elections ==
All 4 Districts of Bulacan elected members of the Bulacan Provincial Board. The first (including Malolos) and fourth (including San Jose del Monte) districts send three board members each, while the second and third districts send two board members each. Election is via plurality-at-large voting; a voter can vote up to the maximum number of board members his district is sending.

Party	Popular vote		Seats	
Party	Total	%	Total	%
NUP	1,304,676	55.14%	8	57%
PDP–Laban	1,028,742	43.48%	2	14%
PFP	32,625	1.38%	0	0%
Total	2,366,043	100%	16	71%

=== 1st District ===
Incumbent Board Members Ayee Ople and Toti Ople were term-limited; Incumbent Board Member Allan Andan ran for his second term.

2019 Provincial Board Election in 1st District of Bulacan
Party	Candidate	Votes	%
PDP–Laban	Allan Andan	159,446	25.28
NUP	Mina Fermin	129,750	20.26
NUP	Jong Ople	121,769	19.02
PDP–Laban	Troi Aldaba	83,729	13.07
PDP–Laban	Zacarias Candelaria	76,966	12.02
NUP	Chris Baluyot	66,059	10.31
Total votes		637,749	100

=== 2nd District ===
Incumbent Board Member Buko dela Cruz was term-limited; his sister and incumbent Baliuag councilor Pechay dela Cruz ran in his stead. The husband of incumbent Board Member Baby Monet Posadas, former Senior Board Member Monet Posadas, ran in her stead.

2019 Provincial Board Election in 2nd District of Bulacan
Party	Candidate	Votes	%
NUP	Pechay dela Cruz	180,439	42.22
NUP	Atty. Monet Posadas	146,531	34.29
PDP–Laban	Bobby Jose	81,086	18.97
PDP–Laban	Tony Deborja	19,234	4.50
Total votes		427,290	100

=== 3rd District ===
Incumbent Board Member Nono Castro is term-limited; his brother Romeo Castro ran in his place. Incumbent Board Member Emily Viceo ran for her second term.

2019 Provincial Board Election in 3rd District of Bulacan
Party	Candidate	Votes	%
NUP	RC Nono Castro	94,059	24.80
NUP	Emily Viceo	93,563	24.67
PDP–Laban	Aye Mariano	92,893	24.50
PDP–Laban	Tantan Cruz	65,978	17.40
PFP	Derek Salvador	32,625	8.60
Total votes		379,118	100

=== 4th District ===
Incumbent Lita delos Santos did not run for reelection; her nephew, former Board Member Jon-jon delos Santos, ran in her stead. Incumbent Board Members Alex Castro and Allan Ray Baluyut ran for their second and third terms, respectively.

2019 Provincial Board Election in 4th District of Bulacan
Party	Candidate	Votes	%
PDP–Laban	Jon-jon delos Santos	215,374	23.36
NUP	Alex Castro	209,800	22.76
NUP	Allan Ray Baluyut	149,498	16.21
PDP–Laban	Froilan Caguiat	136,229	14.77
NUP	BJ Bartolome	113,208	12.26
PDP–Laban	Mir Samera	97,807	10.61
Total votes		922,096	100

== City and Municipal Elections ==
All cities and municipalities of Bulacan also elected their new mayor and vice-mayor in this election. The candidates for mayor and vice mayor with the highest number of votes won the respective seats; they were voted separately, and may therefore have come from different parties. Below is the list of mayoralty candidates of each city and municipality, grouped per district.

=== First district ===
- City: Malolos
- Municipalities: Bulakan, Calumpit, Hagonoy, Paombong, Pulilan

==== Malolos City ====
Incumbent Mayor Christian Natividad was term-limited and he ran for Governor. Bebong Gatchalian won with a margin of 4,545 votes (4.85%).

Malolos City mayoral election
Party	Candidate	Votes	%
PDP–Laban	Bebong Gatchalian	49,072	52.42
NUP	Didis Domingo	44,527	47.57
Total votes		93,599	100
PDP–Laban hold			

Incumbent Vice Mayor Gilbert "Bebong" Gatchalian was term-limited and he ran for Mayor. His running mate, incumbent Councilor Noel "Len" Pineda, faced incumbent Board Member Ayee Ople for Vice Mayor. Pineda won with a percentage of 39.42% against Toots Bautista's 30.32% and Ople's 29.80%.

Malolos City Vice mayoral election
Party	Candidate	Votes	%
PDP–Laban	Len Pineda	35,564	39.42
Independent	Toots Bautista	27,356	30.32
NUP	Ayee Ople	26,866	29.80
Independent	Henry Capela	401	0.44
Total votes		90,207	100
PDP–Laban hold			

==== Bulakan ====
Incumbent Mayor Patrick Neil Meneses was term-limited, and ran for Vice Mayor. His brother, incumbent Councilor Piccolo, ran for Mayor against former PBA player and JRU Heavy Bombers head coach Vergel Meneses. Vergel won with a margin of 6,993 votes (17.51%).

Bulakan mayoral election
Party	Candidate	Votes	%
PDP–Laban	Vergel Meneses	23,469	58.75
NUP	Piccolo Meneses	16,476	41.24
Total votes		39,945	100
PDP–Laban gain from NUP			

Incumbent Vice Mayor Alberto "Berting" Bituin was term-limited, and ran for councilor. Patrick Neil Meneses won with a margin of only 39 votes (0.1%).

Bulakan Vice mayoral election
Party	Candidate	Votes	%
NUP	Patrick Neil Meneses	19,594	50.04
PDP–Laban	Marian Ramos	19,555	49.95
Total votes		39,149	100
NUP hold			

==== Calumpit ====
Incumbent Mayor Jessie de Jesus ran for his third term unopposed.

Calumpit mayoral election
Party	Candidate	Votes	%
NUP	Jessie de Jesus	37,102	100
Total votes		37,102	100
NUP hold			

Incumbent Vice Mayor Zar Candelaria was term-limited, and ran for board member under PDP-Laban. The candidates for Vice Mayor were incumbent Councilors Thelma Antonio-Dansalan and Victor "Aboy" de Belen.

Calumpit Vice mayoral election
Party	Candidate	Votes	%
Independent	Aboy de Belen	28,991	58.68
NUP	Thelma Dansalan	20,407	41.31
Total votes		49,398	100
Independent gain from PDP–Laban			

==== Hagonoy ====
Incumbent Mayor Raulito "Amboy" Manlapaz ran for his third and final term. He faced the daughter of incumbent Governor Wilhelmino Sy-Alvarado, Ate Charo Sy-Alvarado, and ABC President Jhane dela Cruz.

Hagonoy mayoral election
Party	Candidate	Votes	%
PDP–Laban	Amboy Manlapaz	22,627	37.99
NUP	Ate Charo Sy-Alvarado	22,281	37.40
PFP	Jhane dela Cruz	14,652	24.60
Total votes		59,560	100
PDP–Laban hold			

Incumbent Vice Mayor Pedro Santos ran for his third consecutive term.

Hagonoy Vice mayoral election
Party	Candidate	Votes	%
Independent	Angelboy Cruz	35,094	63.50
NUP	Vice Kap Santos	20,168	36.49
Total votes		55,262	100
Independent gain from NUP			

==== Paombong ====
Incumbent Mayor Mary Ann Marcos ran for her second term. Her opponent was former Mayor Isagani Castro.

Paombong mayoral election
Party	Candidate	Votes	%
PDP–Laban	Ann Marcos	14,913	55.12
NUP	Gani Castro	12,138	44.87
Total votes		27,051	100
PDP–Laban hold			

Incumbent Vice Mayor Cristina Gonzales ran for her second term.

Paombong Vice mayoral election
Party	Candidate	Votes	%
NUP	Maria Cristina Gonzales	17,715	66.15
PDP–Laban	Edgardo Cabantog	9,063	33.84
Total votes		26,778	100
NUP hold			

==== Pulilan ====
Incumbent Mayor Maritz Ochoa-Montejo ran for her second term unopposed.

Pulilan mayoral election
Party	Candidate	Votes	%
Nacionalista	Maritz Montejo	29,400	100
Total votes		29,400	100
Nacionalista hold			

Incumbent Vice Mayor Ricardo "Rec" Candido ran for his second term against incumbent Councilor Enoc "Jayjay" Santos.

Pulilan Vice mayoral election
Party	Candidate	Votes	%
Lakas	Rec Candido	24,563	53.56
PDP–Laban	Jayjay Santos	21,295	46.43
Total votes		45,858	100
Lakas hold			

=== Second district ===
- Municipalities: Balagtas, Baliuag, Bocaue, Bustos, Guiguinto, Pandi, Plaridel

==== Balagtas ====
Incumbent Mayor Eladio Gonzales Jr. ran for his second term.

Balagtas mayoral election
Party	Candidate	Votes	%
PDP–Laban	JR Gonzales	22,170	62.96
LM	Reynaldo Samaniego	13,039	37.03
Total votes		35,209	100
PDP–Laban hold			

Incumbent Vice Mayor Alberto "Bobby" Carating ran for his second term.

Balagtas Vice mayoral election
Party	Candidate	Votes	%
PDP–Laban	Ariel Valderama	17,191	48.69
Independent	Alberto Carating II	15,366	43.52
Independent	Ferdinand Ramos	2,745	7.77
Total votes		35,302	100
PDP–Laban gain from Independent			

==== Baliuag ====
Incumbent Mayor Ferdinand Estrella ran for his second term against former Mayor Carolina Dellosa.

Baliuag mayoral election
Party	Candidate	Votes	%
PDP–Laban	Ferdie Estrella	50,910	63.70
NUP	Carolina Dellosa	29,010	36.29
Total votes		79,920	100
PDP–Laban hold			

Incumbent Vice Mayor Christopher Clemente ran for his third term.

Baliuag Vice mayoral election
Party	Candidate	Votes	%
NUP	Cris Clemente	42,416	54.80
PDP–Laban	Joel Pascual	23,725	30.65
Independent	Cecile Quimpo	11,258	14.54
Total votes		77,399	100
NUP hold			

==== Bocaue ====
Incumbent Mayor Eleanor "Joni" Villanueva-Tugna ran for her second term against former Provincial Administrator Jim Valerio.

Bocaue mayoral election
Party	Candidate	Votes	%
PDP–Laban	Joni Villanueva	32,083	58.86
NUP	Kuya Jim Valerio	22,422	41.13
Total votes		54,505	100
PDP–Laban hold			

Incumbent Vice Mayor Aldrin Sta. Ana ran for Councilor. His party nominated former Vice Mayor Jose Santiago Jr., who went up against Mayor Villanueva's running mate, incumbent Councilor Noriel German.

Bocaue Vice mayoral election
Party	Candidate	Votes	%
NUP	JJS Jonjon Santiago	30,084	56.42
PDP–Laban	Supergerman German	23,237	43.57
Total votes		53,321	100
NUP hold			

==== Bustos ====
Incumbent Mayor Arnel Mendoza was term-limited and ran for Vice Mayor.

Bustos mayoral election
Party	Candidate	Votes	%
PDP–Laban	Iskul Juan	10,968	32.53
NPC	Freddie Bermudez	10,423	30.91
NUP	Ading Leoncio	10,421	30.91
PFP	Ed Cunanan	1,898	5.63
Total votes		33,710	100
PDP–Laban gain from NUP			

Incumbent Vice Mayor Ading Leoncio ran for Mayor. Incumbent Mayor Arnel Mendoza ran against former Vice Mayor Loida Rivera and incumbent Councilor Romulo Lazaro.

Bustos Vice mayoral election
Party	Candidate	Votes	%
NUP	Arnel Mendoza	16,399	49.73
NPC	Loida Rivera	11,954	36.25
PDP–Laban	Mulong Lazaro	4,619	14.00
Total votes		32,972	100
NUP hold			

==== Guiguinto ====
Incumbent Mayor Ambrosio "Boy" Cruz ran for his third term. His opponent was incumbent Vice Mayor Banjo Estrella.

Guiguinto mayoral election
Party	Candidate	Votes	%
NUP	Ambrosio Cruz Jr.	33,139	64.07
PDP–Laban	Banjo Estrella	18,577	35.92
Total votes		51,716	100
NUP hold			

Incumbent Vice Mayor Banjo Estrella ran for Mayor. The candidates for Vice Mayor were incumbent Councilors JJ Santos and Ricky Jose

Guiguinto Vice mayoral election
Party	Candidate	Votes	%
NUP	JJ Santos	30,958	63.95
PDP–Laban	Ricky Jose	17,445	36.04
Total votes		48,403	100
NUP gain from PDP–Laban			

==== Pandi ====
Incumbent Mayor Tinoy Marquez ran for his second term. Among his opponents was former Mayor Rico Roque.

Pandi mayoral election
Party	Candidate	Votes	%
NUP	Rico Roque	27,609	56.93
PDP–Laban	Tinoy Marquez	19,917	41.07
PFP	Rodelio Marquez	585	1.20
PMP	Basilio de Mesa	380	0.78
Total votes		48,491	100
NUP gain from PDP–Laban			

Incumbent Vice Mayor Noel Roxas ran for his second term.

Pandi Vice mayoral election
Party	Candidate	Votes	%
NUP	Lui Sebastian	26,164	56.50
PDP–Laban	Noel Roxas	18,054	38.98
PMP	Romulo Fajardo	1,075	2.32
PFP	Arden Roxas	1,014	2.18
Total votes		46,307	100
NUP gain from PDP–Laban			

==== Plaridel ====
Former Mayor Anastacia "Tessie" Vistan, mother of incumbent Mayor Jocell Vistan-Casaje, ran unopposed.

Plaridel mayoral election
Party	Candidate	Votes	%
NUP	Tessie Vistan	40,608	100
Total votes		40,608	100
NUP hold			

Incumbent Vice Mayor Imelda "Mhel" Gatdula-de Leon ran for her second term unopposed.

Plaridel Vice mayoral election
Party	Candidate	Votes	%
NUP	Mhel de Leon	40,610	100
Total votes		40,610	100
NUP hold			

=== Third district ===
- Municipalities: Angat, Doña Remedios Trinidad, Norzagaray, San Ildefonso, San Miguel, San Rafael

==== Angat ====
Incumbent Mayor Leonardo de Leon ran for his third and final term.

Angat mayoral election
Party	Candidate	Votes	%
PDP–Laban	Narding de Leon	19,607	66.55
NUP	Lito Vergel de Dios	9,851	33.44
Total votes		29,458	100
PDP–Laban hold			

Incumbent Vice Mayor Gilberto "Reggie" Santos ran for his second term against former Vice Mayor Reynante "Jowar" Bautista.

Angat Vice mayoral election
Party	Candidate	Votes	%
NUP	Jowar Bautista	17,825	61.64
PDP–Laban	Reggie Santos	11,091	38.35
Total votes		28,916	100
NUP gain from PDP–Laban			

==== Doña Remedios Trinidad ====
Incumbent Mayor Ronaldo Flores was term-limited, and ran for Vice Mayor; his wife Marita ran for Mayor.

Doña Remedios Trinidad mayoral election
Party	Candidate	Votes	%
NUP	Marie Flores	11,307	68.77
Nacionalista	Evelyn Paulino	5,062	30.79
Independent	Montano San Pedro	71	0.43
Total votes		16,440	100
NUP hold			

Incumbent Vice Mayor Larry Cruz ran for his second term.

Doña Remedios Trinidad Vice mayoral election
Party	Candidate	Votes	%
NUP	RTF Flores	11,627	71.79
Nacionalista	Jumong Piadozo	3,903	24.10
Independent	Larry Cruz	664	4.10
Total votes		16,194	100
NUP gain from Independent			

==== Norzagaray ====
Incumbent mayor Fred Germar ran for his third term. He had been removed from office for grave misconduct on August 10, 2016, a decision reversed by the Supreme Court on November 23, 2018. His opponents were the incumbent vice mayor and former acting mayor Ade Cristobal and former mayor Matilde Legaspi.

Norzagaray mayoral election
Party	Candidate	Votes	%
PDP–Laban	Fred Germar	26,984	52.11
PMP	Matilde Legaspi	12,347	23.84
NUP	Ade Cristobal	12,272	23.70
Independent	Joe Tulop	173	0.33
Total votes		51,776	100
PDP–Laban hold			

Incumbent councilor Boyet Santos ran for a full term as vice mayor; he was elected as the top Municipal Councilor in 2016, and as such had been acting vice mayor while Germar was out of office.

Norzagaray Vice mayoral election
Party	Candidate	Votes	%
PDP–Laban	Boyet Santos	20,166	40.27
NUP	Junjun Saplala	16,931	33.81
PMP	JJ Ople	12,564	25.09
Independent	Merto Sarmiento	412	0.82
Total votes		50,073	100
PDP–Laban hold			

==== San Ildefonso ====
Incumbent Mayor Carla Galvez-Tan ran for her second term even as she was suspended for 9 months on 29 August 2018. She was up against her cousin, former Mayor Gerald Galvez.

San Ildefonso mayoral election
Party	Candidate	Votes	%
PDP–Laban	Carla Galvez	31,934	53.31
NUP	Mike Lipana	23,847	39.81
UNA	Gerald Galvez	4,111	6.86
Total votes		59,892	100
PDP–Laban hold			

Incumbent Vice Mayor and Acting Mayor Luis Sarrondo ran for his second term. He was up against incumbent Councilor and Acting Vice Mayor Zander Galvez and incumbent Councilor Rocky Sarmiento.

San Ildefonso Vice mayoral election
Party	Candidate	Votes	%
PDP–Laban	Rocky Sarmiento	27,889	48.97
NUP	Luis Sarrondo	15,804	27.75
UNA	Zander Galvez	13,252	23.27
Total votes		56,955	100
PDP–Laban gain from NUP			

==== San Miguel ====
Incumbent Mayor Marivee Mendez-Coronel ran for her second term against former Mayor Roderick Tiongson and Atty. Jose Francisco S. Cabochan.

San Miguel Mayoralty Election
Party	Candidate	Votes	%
UNA	Roderick Tiongson	29,883	39.75
NUP	Ivy Mendez Coronel	27,534	36.63
PDP–Laban	Jiboy Cabochan	17,746	23.61
Total votes		75,163	100
UNA gain from NUP			

Incumbent Vice Mayor John "Bong" Alvarez ran for his second term.

San Miguel Vice Mayoralty Election
Party	Candidate	Votes	%
PDP–Laban	Bong Alvarez	37,953	54.20
NUP	Mimio Dizon	24,916	35.58
UNA	Miguelito Dela Cruz	7,146	10.20
Total votes		70,015	100
PDP–Laban hold			

==== San Rafael ====
Incumbent Mayor Cipriano "Goto" Violago ran for his third and final term.

San Rafael mayoral election
Party	Candidate	Votes	%
Lakas	Goto Violago	36,508	76.55
PMP	Gen Frank Villaroman	11,180	23.44
Total votes		47,688	100
Lakas hold			

Incumbent Vice Mayor Edison Veneracion ran for his third and final term.

San Rafael Vice mayoral election
Party	Candidate	Votes	%
Lakas	Edison Veneracion	36,112	75.46
PMP	Col Ramir Viola	11,742	24.53
Total votes		47,854	100
Lakas hold			

=== Fourth district ===
- Cities: Meycauayan, San Jose del Monte
- Municipalities: Marilao, Obando, Santa Maria

==== Meycauayan City ====
Incumbent Mayor Henry Villarica ran for Representative of the 4th district; his wife, Deputy Speaker and incumbent Representative Linabelle Villarica, ran for Mayor.

Meycauayan City mayoral election
Party	Candidate	Votes	%
PDP–Laban	Linabelle Villarica	44,744	52.29
Independent	Klaus Meine Ryan Cayanan	40,848	47.70
Total votes		85,592	100
PDP–Laban hold			

Incumbent Vice Mayor Rafael "Jojo" Manzano was term-limited; his party nominated incumbent Councilor Jojie Violago, who ran unopposed.

Meycauayan City Vice mayoral election
Party	Candidate	Votes	%
PDP–Laban	Jojie Violago	66,971	100
Total votes		66,971	100
PDP–Laban hold			

==== Marilao ====
Incumbent Mayor Juanito "Tito" Santiago did not seek reelection; his party nominated former Municipal ABC President Ricky Silvestre.

Marilao mayoral election
Party	Candidate	Votes	%
PDP–Laban	Ricky Silvestre	33,301	49.28
NUP	Atty. Jem Sy	31,419	46.49
Independent	Andre Santos	2,297	3.39
Independent	Jojo Atienza	377	0.55
PFP	JM-Jun Montaos	180	0.26
Total votes		67,574	100
PDP–Laban hold			

Incumbent Vice Mayor Henry Lutao ran for his second term.

Marilao Vice mayoral election
Party	Candidate	Votes	%
PDP–Laban	Henry Lutao	39,943	60.76
NUP	Romell Pabale	24,992	38.01
PFP	Zaldy Marcelo	802	1.22
Total votes		65,737	100
PDP–Laban hold			

==== Obando ====
Incumbent Mayor Edwin Santos ran for his third and final term against incumbent Councilor Artus Sayao.

Obando mayoral election
Party	Candidate	Votes	%
PDP–Laban	Edwin Santos	13,548	53.33
NUP	Artus Sayao	11,855	46.66
Total votes		25,403	100
PDP–Laban hold			

Incumbent Vice Mayor Arvin dela Cruz ran for his second term against former Vice Mayor Danilo de Ocampo.

Obando Vice mayoral election
Party	Candidate	Votes	%
NUP	Kuya Arvin dela Cruz	13,475	53.87
PDP–Laban	DDO de Ocampo	11,535	46.12
Total votes		25,010	100
NUP hold			

==== Santa Maria ====
Incumbent Mayor Russell Pleyto ran for his second term against former Mayors Bartolome "Omeng" Ramos and Jesus "Ato" Mateo.

Santa Maria mayoral election
Party	Candidate	Votes	%
PDP–Laban	Yoyoy Pleyto	41,872	41.87
NUP	Omeng Ramos	38,812	38.81
PFP	Jesus Mateo	19,305	19.30
Total votes		99,989	100
PDP–Laban hold			

Incumbent Vice Mayor Ricky Buenaventura ran for his second term against incumbent Councilor Nelson Luciano.

Santa Maria Vice mayoral election
Party	Candidate	Votes	%
PDP–Laban	Ricky Buenaventura	55,944	59.15
NUP	Nelson Luciano	38,623	40.84
Total votes		94,567	100
PDP–Laban hold			

=== San Jose del Monte City ===
Incumbent Mayor Arthur Robes ran for his second term against former City Mayor Reynaldo San Pedro.

San Jose del Monte mayoral election
Party	Candidate	Votes	%
AR	Arthur Robes	98,808	57.04
PFP	Reynaldo San Pedro	74,402	42.95
Total votes		173,210	100
AR hold			

Incumbent Vice Mayor Efren Bartolome Jr. ran for his second term unopposed.

San Jose del Monte Vice mayoral election
Party	Candidate	Votes	%
AR	Efren Bartolome Jr.	143,478	100
Total votes		143,478	100
AR hold			
