= Governor of Bulacan =

Local chief executive

- Gobernador ng Lalawigan ng Bulacan
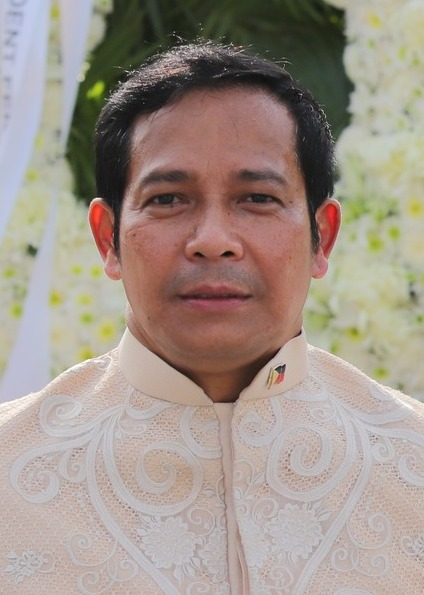
- Incumbent; Daniel Fernando since June 30, 2019
- Status: head of government
- Seat: Bulacan Provincial Capitol
- Term length: 3 years Renewable twice
- Inaugural holder: Gregorio del Pilar
- Formation: 1897
- Website: Official Website of the Province of Bulacan

The governor of Bulacan (Filipino: Gobernador ng Lalawigan ng Bulacan) is the local chief executive of the province of Bulacan in Central Luzon region of the country. The governor holds office at the Bulacan Provincial Capitol in Malolos City.

== List of governors of Bulacan ==
Nacionalista Liberal Lakas–CMD NUP
No.	Portrait	Governor	Term of office	Place of origin	Vice-governor
Revolutionary Governors (1899–1900)
1		Gen. Gregorio del Pilar (Gregorio Hilario del Pilar y Sempio); November 14, 1875 – December 2, 1899 (Aged 24) †	May 1898 – December 2, 1899	San Jose, Bulakan	None
2		Brig. Gen. Isidoro Torres (Isidoro Torres y Dayao); April 10, 1866 – December 5, 1928 (Aged 62)	1899	Matimbo, Malolos	none
		Segundo Rodrigo	1898–1899	Bulakan	none
3		Col. José Juan Serapio	1900–1901	Bagbaguin, Santa Maria	none
American Period (1901–1937)
4		Pablo Ocampo Tecson; July 4, 1858 – April 30, 1940 (Aged 81)	1902–1906	San Miguel (formerly San Miguel de Mayumo)	none
5		Teodoro Sandiko (Teodoro Sandiko y Santa Ana); March 31, 1860 – October 19, 1939 (Aged 79)	1906–1909	Pandacan	none
6		Donato Teodoro	1910–1912	Sto. Cristo, Malolos	none
7		Trinidad Icasiano; 1883 – ??	June 4, 1912 – 1916	Santa Maria	none
8		Nicolas Buendia; March 12, 1879 – September 14, 1958 (Aged 79)	1916–1919	Malolos	none
9		Juan B. Carlos	1919–1921	Baliuag	none
10		Dr. Pío Valenzuela; Pío Valenzuela y Alejandrino; July 11, 1869 – April 6, 1956 (Aged 86)	1921–1925	Valenzuela (Formerly Polo)	none
11		Restituto J. Castro	1925–1928	Bulakan	none
12		José Padilla Sr.	1928–1931	Plaridel	none
13		Cirilo B. Santos	1931–1934	San Miguel	none
14		José Padilla Sr.	1934–1937	Plaridel	none
Commonwealth Period (1938–1946)
15		Jacinto Molina	1938–1940	Bulacan	none
16		Emilio Rustia	1941–1943	Baliuag	none
17		Fortunato F. Halili; February 28, 1898 – ??	1943–1944	Bagbaguin, Santa Maria	none
18		Javier Fabalan	1944	San Miguel	none
19		Jose delos Reyes	1944		none
20		Alejo S. Santos; July 17, 1911 — February 18, 1984 (Aged 72)	1945–1946	Bustos	none
Third and Fourth Philippine Republic (1946–1986)
21		Arturo Samaniego	1946		none
22		Pedro Viudez	1946		none
23		Fortunato F. Halili; February 28, 1898 – ??	1946–1951	Bagbaguin, Santa Maria	none
24		Teofilo Sauco	1951	Baliuag	none
25		Alejo S. Santos; July 17, 1911 — February 18, 1984 (Aged 72)	1952–1957	Bustos	none
26		Tomas S. Martin	1958–1963	Hagonoy	Manolo Cruz
27		Jose M. Villarama	1964–1967	Angat	Salvador Santiago
28		Ignacio Santiago Sr. August 31, 1929 – December 2, 2015 (Aged 86)	January 1, 1968 – March 23, 1986	Valenzuela	Amado Pineda (1968–1971); Wilfrido Villarama (1972–1975); Bernardo Ople (1980–1986)
Fifth Philippine Republic (1986–present)
29		Roberto M. Pagdanganan; July 19, 1946 (Age 80)	May 1, 1986 – December 1, 1987	Calumpit	Francisco Aniag Jr. (1986–1987); Virgilio Robes (1987)
30		Amado T. Pineda; September 13, 1920 – December 16, 1995 (Aged 75)	December 1, 1987 – January 31, 1988	Calumpit	Virgilio Robes
29		Roberto M. Pagdanganan; July 19, 1946 (Age 80)	February 2, 1988 – June 30, 1998	Calumpit	Ricardo Nicolas (1988–1989); Ramon Villarama (1989–1992); Josefina dela Cruz (1992–1998)
31		Josefina M. dela Cruz; April 15, 1958 (Age 68)	June 30, 1998 – June 30, 2007	Bocaue	Aurelio Plamenco
32		Joselito Andrew R. Mendoza; November 10, 1962 (Age 63)	June 30, 2007 – June 30, 2010	Bocaue	Wilhelmino Sy-Alvarado
33		Wilhelmino M. Sy-Alvarado; December 29, 1946 (Age 79)	June 30, 2010 – June 30, 2019	Hagonoy	Daniel Fernando (Cesar Fernando Ramirez)
34		Daniel R. Fernando (Cesar Fernando Ramirez); May 12, 1962 (Age 64)	June 30, 2019 – Incumbent	Guiguinto	Wilhelmino Sy-Alvarado (2019–2022); Alex Castro (since 2022)

== Elections ==
- 1988 Bulacan local elections
- 1992 Bulacan local elections
- 1995 Bulacan local elections
- 1998 Bulacan local elections
- 2001 Bulacan local elections
- 2004 Bulacan local elections
- 2007 Bulacan local elections
- 2010 Bulacan local elections
- 2013 Bulacan local elections
- 2016 Bulacan local elections
- 2019 Bulacan local elections
- 2022 Bulacan local elections
- 2025 Bulacan local elections
