= 2013 Bulacan local elections =

Philippine election

2013 Bulacan gubernatorial election
- May 13, 2013
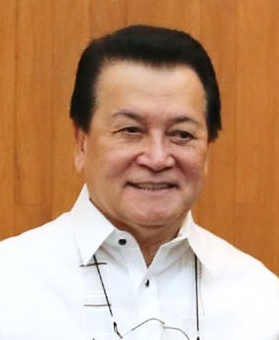
Nominee	Wilhelmino Sy-Alvarado
Party	NUP
Running mate	Daniel Fernando
Popular vote	766,729
Percentage	100.00%
Governor before election
Wilhelmino Sy-Alvarado
NUP
Elected Governor
Wilhelmino Sy-Alvarado
NUP

Local elections were held in the province of Bulacan on May 13, 2013, as part of the 2013 general election. Voters will select candidates for all local positions: a town mayor, vice mayor and town councilors, as well as members of the Sangguniang Panlalawigan, the vice-governor, governor and representatives for the four districts of Bulacan.

== Provincial Elections ==
The candidates for governor and vice governor with the highest number of votes wins the seat; they are voted separately, therefore, they may be of different parties when elected.

Incumbent Governor Wilhelmino Sy-Alvarado of NUP is running for his reelection unopposed, his running mate is Incumbent Vice Governor and Actor Daniel Fernando.

=== Candidates for Governor ===
Parties are as stated in their certificate of candidacies.

Incumbent Wilhelmino Sy-Alvarado is running unopposed

Bulacan gubernatorial election
Party	Candidate	Votes	%
NUP	Wilhelmino Sy-Alvarado	766,729	100
Total votes		766,729	100
NUP hold			

=== Candidates for Vice-Governor ===
Parties are as stated in their certificate of candidacies.

Bulacan vice gubernatorial election
Party	Candidate	Votes	%
NUP	Daniel Fernando	785,923	91.52
Independent	Josie Lopez	50,137	5.84
Independent	Manny Ocampo	22,654	2.64
Total votes		858,714	100
NUP hold			

=== Congressional Election ===
Each of Bulacan's four legislative districts will elect each representative to the House of Representatives. The candidate with the highest number of votes wins the seat.

==== 1st District ====
Ma. Victoria Sy-Alvarado is the incumbent.

2013 Philippine House of Representatives election at Bulacan's 1st district
Party	Candidate	Votes	%
NUP	Ma. Victoria Sy-Alvarado	155,783	95.13
Independent	Sahiron Salim	7,972	4.87
Total votes		163,755	100
NUP hold			

==== 2nd District ====
Incumbent Pedro Pancho is term limited; his son Gavini is his party's nominee.

Independent candidate Pancho Ordanes withdrew his candidacy.

2013 Philippine House of Representatives election at Bulacan's 2nd district
Party	Candidate	Votes	%
NUP	Apol Pancho	143,705	59.86
Liberal	Doc Pete Mendoza	88,285	36.77
Independent	Jimmy Villafuerte	5,092	2.12
Independent	Joseph Cristobal	2,274	0.95
PDP–Laban	Tony Deborja	729	0.30
Total votes		240,085	100
NUP hold			

==== 3rd District ====
Joselito Mendoza is the incumbent.

2013 Philippine House of Representatives election at Bulacan's 3rd district
Party	Candidate	Votes	%
Liberal	Jonjon Mendoza	102,624	56.17
UNA	Boji Cabochan	46,955	25.70
Independent	Enrique Viudez II	29,710	16.26
PMP	Ricky Silverio	3,422	1.87
Total votes		182,711	100
Liberal hold			

==== 4th District ====
Linabelle Villarica is the incumbent.

2013 Philippine House of Representatives election at Bulacan's 4th district
Party	Candidate	Votes	%
Liberal	Linabelle Ruth Villarica	183,983	90.82
Independent	Jelo Lopez	18,598	9.18
Total votes		202,581	100
Liberal hold			

==== San Jose del Monte ====
Arthur Robes is the incumbent.

2013 Philippine House of Representatives election at San Jose del Monte
Party	Candidate	Votes	%
Liberal	Arthur Robes	74,302	63.16
Lakas	Imelda Papin	37,526	31.90
Independent	Oca Robes	2,571	2.19
Independent	Albert Rejante	1,605	1.36
Independent	Roger Montinola	925	0.79
Independent	Ian Miso	711	0.60
Total votes		381,029	100
Liberal hold			

=== Sangguniang Panlalawigan Elections ===
All 4 Districts of Bulacan will elect Sangguniang Panlalawigan or provincial board members. The first (including Malolos) and fourth (including San Jose del Monte) districts sends three board members each, while the second and third districts sends two board members each. Election is via plurality-at-large voting; a voter can vote up to the maximum number of board members his district is sending.

==== 1st District ====
Bulacan 1st District Sangguniang Panlalawigan election
Party	Candidate	Votes	%
NUP	Michael Fermin	122,238	32.08
NUP	Toti Ople	110,244	28.93
NUP	Ayee Ople	109,849	28.83
UNA	Dax Uy	19,999	5.25
Independent	Jose Cundangan	18,699	4.91
Total votes		381,029	100

==== 2nd District ====
Bulacan 2nd District Sangguniang Panlalawigan election
Party	Candidate	Votes	%
NUP	Buko dela Cruz	139,967	47.23
NUP	Monet Posadas	110,534	37.30
Independent	Rey Trinidad	45,829	15.47
Total votes		296,330	100

==== 3rd District ====
Bulacan 3rd District Sangguniang Panlalawigan election
Party	Candidate	Votes	%
NUP	Nono Castro	92,959	34.13
Liberal	Erning Sulit	69,499	25.52
UNA	Emily Viceo	55,287	20.30
Independent	Peter Alvin Violago	45,875	16.84
Independent	Kapitan Putol Bernabe	8,746	3.21
Total votes		272,366	100

==== 4th District ====
Bulacan 4th District Sangguniang Panlalawigan election
Party	Candidate	Votes	%
NUP	Jon-jon delos Santos	180,208	26.74
NUP	King Sarmiento	158,698	23.54
Nacionalista	Allan Ray Baluyut	139,289	20.67
Liberal	Ryan Santos	114,934	17.05
Independent	Dhey Alejo	29,112	4.32
Independent	Romeo Almario	26,469	3.93
Independent	Hilario dela Merced Jr.	25,291	3.75
Total votes		674,001	100

== City and Municipal Elections ==
All cities and municipalities of Bulacan will elect mayor and vice-mayor this election. The candidates for mayor and vice mayor with the highest number of votes wins the seat; they are voted separately, therefore, they may be of different parties when elected.

Below is the list of mayoralty and vice mayoralty candidates of each city and municipalities per district.

=== 1st District ===
- City: Malolos
- Municipalities: Bulacan, Calumpit, Hagonoy, Paombong, Pulilan

==== City of Malolos ====
Christian Natividad is the incumbent, his opponent is former mayor Danilo Domingo.

Malolos City mayoralty election
Party	Candidate	Votes	%
Liberal	Christian Natividad	43,036	56.55
UNA	Danny Domingo	33,060	43.45
Total votes		76,096	100
Liberal hold			

Malolos City vice mayoralty election
Party	Candidate	Votes	%
Liberal	Bebong Gatchalian	44,073	59.99
UNA	Noel Sacay	29,398	40.01
Total votes		73,471	100
Liberal hold			

==== Bulakan ====
Patrick Meneses is the incumbent.

Bulakan, Bulacan mayoralty election
Party	Candidate	Votes	%
NUP	Patrick Neil Meneses	17,854	61.37
LDP	Roberto Ramirez	10,802	37.13
Independent	Manny Meneses	435	1.50
Total votes		29,091	100
NUP hold			

Bulakan, Bulacan vice mayoralty election
Party	Candidate	Votes	%
NUP	Alberto Bituin	17,450	62.88
LDP	Aina Pagsibigan	10,303	37.12
Total votes		27,753	100
NUP hold			

==== Calumpit ====
James P. De Jesus (The Brother of Jess P. De Jesus) is the incumbent mayor.

Calumpit mayoralty election
Party	Candidate	Votes	%
NUP	Jess de Jesus	20,265	56.66
UNA	Jun Lopez	15,499	43.34
Total votes		35,764	100
NUP hold			

Calumpit vice mayoralty election
Party	Candidate	Votes	%
NUP	Zar Candelaria	22,547	66.26
UNA	El Bunag	11,479	33.74
Total votes		34,026	100
NUP hold			

==== Hagonoy ====
Angel Cruz, Jr. is the incumbent.

Hagonoy mayoralty election
Party	Candidate	Votes	%
PMP	Amboy Manlapaz	26,389	50.78
Lapiang K	Angel Cruz Jr.	25,575	49.22
Total votes		51,964	100
PMP gain from Lapiang K			

Hagonoy vice mayoralty election
Party	Candidate	Votes	%
Independent	Kap Santos	3,035	
Independent	Kenneth Bautista	2,527	
PMP	Tina Perez	2,220	
Lapiang K	Amber Villanueva	1,519	
Total votes		9,401	
Independent gain from PMP			

==== Paombong ====
Incumbent Donato Marcos withdrew his candidacy, he was substitute by his wife Maryanne Marcos. Her opponent is councilor Gani Castro.

Paombong mayoralty election
Party	Candidate	Votes	%
Independent	Gani Castro	7,836	54.45
Liberal	Maryanne Marcos	6,554	45.55
Total votes		14,390	100
Independent gain from Liberal			

Paombong vice mayoralty election
Party	Candidate	Votes	%
Liberal	Marisa Ramos	9,732	100
Total votes		9,732	100
Liberal hold			

==== Pulilan ====
Incumbent Vicente Esguerra running for his third and final term unopposed and independent.

Pulilan mayoralty election
Party	Candidate	Votes	%
Independent	Vicente Esguerra Sr.	28,374	100
Total votes		28,374	100
Independent hold			

Pulilan vice mayoralty election
Party	Candidate	Votes	%
Independent	Elpidio Castillo	27,165	100
Total votes		27,165	100
Independent hold			

=== 2nd District ===
- Municipalities: Balagtas, Baliuag, Bocaue, Bustos, Guiguinto, Pandi, Plaridel

==== Balagtas ====
Romeo Castro is the incumbent. his opponent is Gina Estrella of UNA.

Balagtas mayoralty election
Party	Candidate	Votes	%
Liberal	Romy Castro	16,295	57.96
UNA	Gina Estrella	11,820	42.04
Total votes		28,115	100
Liberal hold			

Balagtas vice mayoralty election
Party	Candidate	Votes	%
Liberal	Emmanuel Galvez	14,438	53.08
UNA	Tate Santiago	12,764	46.92
Total votes		27,202	100
Liberal hold			

==== Baliuag ====
Incumbent Romeo Estrella is term-limited, Provincial league of Barangays President Ferdie Estrella is his party's nominee.

Baliuag mayoralty election
Party	Candidate	Votes	%
Independent	Carol Dellosa	22,453	38.32
NUP	Ferdie Estrella	21,759	37.14
Liberal	Rolando Salvador	14,382	24.54
Total votes		58,594	100
Independent gain from NUP			

Baliuag vice mayoralty election
Party	Candidate	Votes	%
Independent	Cris Clemente	21,602	38.54
Liberal	Ferdinand Cruz	18,403	32.83
NUP	Tony Patawaran	16,050	28.63
Total votes		56,055	100
Independent gain from NUP			

==== Bocaue ====
Jon-Jon Villanueva is the incumbent, his main opponents are vice mayor Jose Santiago, Jr. and former mayor Serafin Dela Cruz.

Bocaue mayoralty election
Party	Candidate	Votes	%
Liberal	Jon-jon JJV Villanueva	17,473	47.37
PMP	Jose Santiago Jr.	14,080	38.17
Independent	Pusod dela Cruz	3,238	8.78
Lakas	Serafin dela Cruz	1,994	5.41
Independent	Tata Gorio dela Cruz	99	0.27
Total votes		36,884	100
Liberal hold			

Bocaue vice mayoralty election
Party	Candidate	Votes	%
Liberal	Dioscoro Juan Jr.	13,787	40.16
PMP	Emmanuel Cruz	10,437	30.40
Independent	Rommel Villanueva	6,347	18.49
Independent	Candido Halili	3,763	10.96
Total votes		34,334	100
Liberal gain from PMP			

==== Bustos ====
Arnel Mendoza is the incumbent, he will face again former mayor Carlito Reyes, on 2010 election Mendoza defeated Reyes with margin of 3442.

Bustos mayoralty election
Party	Candidate	Votes	%
NUP	Arnel Mendoza	15,505	54.58
Liberal	Toti Reyes	12,845	45.22
Independent	Rufino Santos	58	0.20
Total votes		28,408	100
NUP hold			

Bustos vice mayoralty election
Party	Candidate	Votes	%
Liberal	Loida Rivera	13,619	49.46
NUP	Romulo Lazaro	10,741	39.01
Independent	Jaime Sebastian	3,175	11.53
Total votes		27,535	100
Liberal hold			

==== Guiguinto ====
Isagani Pascual is the incumbent, his opponent is former mayor Ambrosio Cruz Jr.

Guiguinto mayoralty election
Party	Candidate	Votes	%
PMP	Ambrosio Cruz Jr.	21,800	54.04
Liberal	Gani Pascual	18,540	45.96
Total votes		40,340	100
PMP gain from Liberal			

Guiguinto vice mayoralty election
Party	Candidate	Votes	%
PMP	Banjo Estrella	24,149	61.45
Liberal	Pute Aballa	15,149	38.55
Total votes		39,298	100
PMP gain from Liberal			

==== Pandi ====
Enrico Roque is the incumbent, his opponent is vice mayor Rachel Oca. Rachel is widow of former mayor Roberto Oca.

It was alleged that Dra. Rachel Santos Oca's Legal team have some proof of election vote-buying violations. Voters were allegedly required to wear yellow baller by the one who was the recipient of this vote-buying activity. Pandi is known for rampant vote-buying activities in the past elections but just like what the Honorable current COMELEC head said, not a single violator has been imprisoned yet in any of this democratic processes.

Pandi mayoralty election
Party	Candidate	Votes	%
NUP	Rico Roque	19,125	62.17
Liberal	Rachel Oca	11,637	37.83
Total votes		30,762	100
NUP hold			

Pandi vice mayoralty election
Party	Candidate	Votes	%
NUP	Oca Marquez	17,341	58.98
Liberal	Lorna Libiran	12,061	41.02
Total votes		29,402	100
NUP gain from Liberal			

==== Plaridel ====
Incumbent Anastacia Vistan is term-limited, her daughter Jocell Vistan is her party's nominee. her main opponent is vice mayor Leo Yap.

Plaridel mayoralty election
Party	Candidate	Votes	%
NUP	Jocell Vistan	18,008	53.94
UNA	Pat Reyes	10,047	30.10
PDP–Laban	Leo Yap	3,061	9.17
Liberal	Ernesto Santiago	2,265	6.79
Total votes		33,381	100
NUP hold			

Plaridel vice mayoralty election
Party	Candidate	Votes	%
UNA	Rolando Javier	10,597	33.14
NUP	Merto Cervania	8,691	27.18
PDP–Laban	Marci Mariano	6,417	20.07
Liberal	Eduardo Salonga	3,955	12.37
Independent	Boy Tan	2,316	7.24
Total votes		31,976	100
UNA gain from PDP–Laban			

=== 3rd District ===
- Municipalities: Angat, Doña Remedios Trinidad, Norzagaray, San Ildefonso, San Miguel, San Rafael

==== Angat ====
Gilberto Santos is the incumbent, his opponent is former mayor Leonardo De Leon.

Angat mayoralty election
Party	Candidate	Votes	%
Liberal	Narding de Leon	12,259	50.71
NUP	Reggie Santos	11,917	49.29
Total votes		24,176	100
Liberal gain from NUP			

Angat vice mayoralty election
Party	Candidate	Votes	%
Liberal	Jowar Bautista	13,102	55.65
NUP	Eric Cruz	10,441	44.35
Total votes		23,543	100
Liberal hold			

==== Doña Remedios Trinidad ====
Ronaldo Flores is the incumbent, his opponent is Pangko Sembrano.

Doña Remedios Trinidad mayoralty election
Party	Candidate	Votes	%
NUP	Ronaldo Flores	8,781	65.52
Independent	Pangko Sembrano	4,620	34.48
Total votes		13,401	100
NUP hold			

Doña Remedios Trinidad vice mayoralty election
Party	Candidate	Votes	%
NUP	Kambal de Leon	4,984	38.93
Independent	Romy Santiago	3,546	27.70
Independent	JV Manalo	2,978	23.26
Independent	Nene Esquivel	1,294	10.11
Total votes		12,802	100
NUP gain from Independent			

==== Norzagaray ====
Fel Legaspi is the incumbent, his opponent is Alfredo "Fred" De Guzman Germar.

Norzagray mayoralty election
Party	Candidate	Votes	%
Liberal	Fred Germar	20,969	51.18
NUP	Feliciano Legaspi Sr.	20,000	48.82
Total votes		40,969	100
Liberal gain from NUP			

Norzagray vice mayoralty election
Party	Candidate	Votes	%
NUP	Arthur Legaspi	13,627	
Liberal	Bobby Esquivel	12,964	
Total votes		26,951	
NUP gain from Liberal			

==== San Ildefonso ====
Incumbent Carla Paula Galvez-Tan withdrew her candidacy to give way to her father, former mayor Edgardo Galvez. His opponent is his nephew, Gerald; Gerald is the son of former mayor Gener Galvez, who is the brother of Edgardo Galvez.

San Ildefonso mayoralty election
Party	Candidate	Votes	%
PDP–Laban	Gerald Galvez	22,270	50.91
Liberal	Sazo Galvez	21,473	49.09
Total votes		43,743	100
PDP–Laban gain from Liberal			

San Ildefonso vice mayoralty election
Party	Candidate	Votes	%
Liberal	Obet Miguel	21,744	52.71
PDP–Laban	Eduardo Velarde	19,509	47.29
Total votes		41,253	100
Liberal hold			

==== San Miguel ====
Roderick Tiongson is the incumbent, his opponent is Brgy. Sta. Ines Captain John "Bong" Alvarez.

San Miguel mayoralty election
Party	Candidate	Votes	%
Liberal	Roderick Tiongson	25,230	54.47
UNA	Bong Alvarez	21,092	45.53
Total votes		46,322	100
Liberal hold			

San Miguel vice mayoralty election
Party	Candidate	Votes	%
Liberal	Ivy Coronel	17,499	39.11
NUP	Josie Buan	15,365	34.34
UNA	Ma. Gemma Alcantara	7,457	16.86
Independent	Excelite Reyes	4,427	9.89
Total votes		44,748	100
Liberal gain from UNA			

==== San Rafael ====
Lorna Silverio is the incumbent, her opponent is vice mayor Goto Violago.

San Rafael mayoralty election
Party	Candidate	Votes	%
Liberal	Goto Violago	28,702	64.57
NUP	Lorna Silverio	15,747	35.43
Total votes		44,449	100
Liberal gain from NUP			

San Rafael vice mayoralty election
Party	Candidate	Votes	%
Liberal	Edison Veneracion	26,437	60.42
UNA	Jovel Viceo	17,322	39.58
Total votes		43,759	100
Liberal hold			

=== 4th District ===
- Cities: Meycauayan,
- Municipalities: Marilao, Obando, Santa Maria

==== Marilao ====
Incumbent Epifanio Guillermo is term-limited, his party nominate vice mayor Tito Santiago. His opponents are Henry Lutao and Ruperto Montaos, Jr.

Marilao mayoralty election
Party	Candidate	Votes	%
Liberal	Tito Santiago	28,091	53.95
Nacionalista	Henry Lutao	23,701	45.52
Independent	JM-Jun Montaos	274	0.53
Total votes		52,066	100
Liberal hold			

Marilao vice mayoralty election
Party	Candidate	Votes	%
Nacionalista	Andre Santos	28,644	55.85
Liberal	Alex Castro	22,306	43.49
Independent	Johnny Zamora	178	0.35
Independent	Alen Coramayan	160	0.31
Total votes		51,288	100
Nacionalista gain from Liberal			

==== Meycauayan City ====
Joan Alarilla is the incumbent, his opponent is former vice mayor Salvador Violago, Sr. on 2010 election. Alarilla defeated Violago with a margin of 10493 votes.

Meycauayan mayoralty election
Party	Candidate	Votes	%
Liberal	Joan Alarilla	44,979	58.90
PDP–Laban	Bogs Violago	31,388	41.10
Total votes		76,367	100
Liberal hold			

Meycauayan vice mayoralty election
Party	Candidate	Votes	%
Liberal	Jojo Manzano	44,446	60.29
PDP–Laban	Rey Valera Guardiano	29,274	39.71
Total votes		73,720	100
Liberal hold			

==== Obando ====
Orencio Gabriel is the incumbent, his opponents are vice mayor Danilo De Ocampo and Edwin Santos. on 2010 election Gabriel defeated Santos with a margin of 7857 votes.

Obando mayoralty election
Party	Candidate	Votes	%
UNA	Edwin Santos	10,891	46.16
NUP	Orencio Gabriel	8,529	36.15
Liberal	Danilo de Ocampo	4,176	17.69
Total votes		23,596	100
UNA gain from NUP			

Obando vice mayoralty election
Party	Candidate	Votes	%
UNA	Zoilito Santiago	7,822	34.48
Liberal	Dean Serapio	7,646	33.70
NUP	Leonardo Pantanilla	7,218	31.82
Total votes		22,686	100
UNA gain from Liberal			

==== Santa Maria ====
Bartolome Ramos is the incumbent, his opponent is Rogelio Barcial.

Santa Maria mayoralty election
Party	Candidate	Votes	%
NUP	Bartolome Ramos	53,834	78.69
Liberal	Rogelio Barcial	14,581	21.31
Total votes		68,415	100
NUP hold			

Santa Maria vice mayoralty election
Party	Candidate	Votes	%
NUP	Rico Jude Sto. Domingo	41,070	60.22
Liberal	Noel Buenaventura	27,129	39.78
Total votes		68,199	100
NUP hold			

==== San Jose del Monte City ====
Reynaldo San Pedro is the incumbent, his main opponents are former mayor Angelito Sarmiento and Florida Robes, the wife of incumbent Congressman Arthur Robes.

San Jose del Monte mayoralty election
Party	Candidate	Votes	%
NUP	Reynaldo San Pedro	54,611	44.25
AR	Florida Robes	39,323	31.86
Liberal	Lito Sarmiento	28,919	23.43
Independent	Cesar Roca	561	0.46
Total votes		123,414	100
NUP hold			

San Jose del Monte vice mayoralty election
Party	Candidate	Votes	%
NUP	Eduardo Roquero Jr.	68,847	59.24
Liberal	Glenn Villano	25,793	22.20
AR	Rose Cabuco	21,570	18.56
Total votes		116,210	100
NUP hold			
