= San Jose del Monte's at-large congressional district =

Legislative district of the Philippines

- Constituency for the House of Representatives of the Philippines
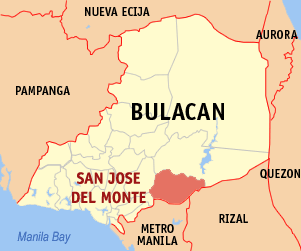
- Location of San Jose del Monte within Bulacan
- City: San Jose del Monte
- Province: Bulacan, Central Luzon
- Population: 651,813 (2020)
- Electorate: 310,314 (2025)
- Area: 105.53 km^{2} (40.75 sq mi)

Current constituency
- Created: 2003
- Representative: Arthur Robes
- Political party: Lakas–CMD; Arangkada San Joseño
- Congressional bloc: Majority

San Jose del Monte's at-large congressional district is the sole congressional district of the Philippines in the city of San Jose del Monte and one of seven in the province of Bulacan. It has been represented in the House of Representatives since 2004. San Jose del Monte first elected a single representative city-wide at-large for the 13th Congress following the passage of Republic Act No. 9230 in 2003 which amended the 2000 San Jose del Monte City Charter (Republic Act No. 8797). Before 2004, the city was represented in the nation's lower house as part of Bulacan's 4th, Bulacan's 2nd, Bulacan's at-large and Region III's at-large districts. It is currently represented in the 20th Congress by Arthur Robes of the Lakas–CMD (Lakas) and Arangkada San Joseño (AR).

== Representation history ==
#	Image	Member	Term of office		Congress	Party	Electoral history
#	Image	Member	Start	End	Congress	Party	Electoral history
=== San Jose del Monte's at-large district for the House of Representatives of the Philippines ===
District created December 18, 2003 from Bulacan's 4th district.
1		Eduardo Roquero	June 30, 2004	June 30, 2007	13th	Lakas	Elected in 2004.
2		Arturo Robes	June 30, 2007	June 30, 2016	14th	Lakas	Elected in 2007.
2		Arturo Robes	June 30, 2007	June 30, 2016	15th	Liberal	Re-elected in 2010.
2		Arturo Robes	June 30, 2007	June 30, 2016	16th	Liberal (AR)	Re-elected in 2013.
3		Florida Robes	June 30, 2016	June 30, 2025	17th	Liberal (AR)	Elected in 2016.
3		Florida Robes	June 30, 2016	June 30, 2025	17th	PDP–Laban (AR)	Elected in 2016.
3		Florida Robes	June 30, 2016	June 30, 2025	18th	NUP (AR)	Re-elected in 2019.
3		Florida Robes	June 30, 2016	June 30, 2025	18th	PDP–Laban (AR)	Re-elected in 2019.
3		Florida Robes	June 30, 2016	June 30, 2025	19th	PFP (AR)	Re-elected in 2022.
(2)		Arturo Robes	June 30, 2025	Incumbent	20th	Lakas (AR)	Elected in 2025.

== Election results ==
=== 2025 ===
2025 Philippine House of Representatives election in San Jose del Monte's Lone District
Party	Candidate	Votes	%
Lakas	Arthur Robes	170,741	74.37
Liberal	Dan Florentino	58,845	25.63
Total votes		229,586	100
Lakas hold			

=== 2022 ===
2022 Philippine House of Representatives election in San Jose del Monte, Bulacan's Lone District
Party	Candidate	Votes	%
PDP–Laban	Florida Robes (incumbent)	136,249	53%
PPM	Reynaldo San Pedro	75,962	46%
Total votes		212,211	100
PDP–Laban hold			

=== 2019 ===
2019 Philippine House of Representatives election in San Jose del Monte, Bulacan's Lone District
Party	Candidate	Votes	%
PDP–Laban	Florida Robes	89,031	53.25
NUP	Irene del Rosario	78,135	46.74
Total votes		167,166	100
PDP–Laban hold			

=== 2016 ===
2016 Philippine House of Representatives election in San Jose del Monte, Bulacan Lone District
Party	Candidate	Votes	%
AR	Florida Robes	83,945	53%
NUP	Eduardo Roquero, Jr.	75,692	47%
Total votes		159,637	100%
AR hold			

=== 2013 ===
2013 Philippine House of Representatives election in San Jose del Monte, Bulacan Lone District
Party	Candidate	Votes	%
Liberal	Arthur Robes	74,302	63.16
Lakas	Imelda Papin	37,526	31.90
Independent	Oscar Robes	2,571	2.19
Independent	Albert Rejante	1,605	1.36
Independent	Rogelio Montinola	925	0.79
Independent	Garret Ian Miso	711	0.60
Total votes		117,640	100.00
Liberal hold			

=== 2010 ===
Philippine House of Representatives election at San Jose del Monte
Party	Candidate	Votes	%
Liberal	Arthur Robes	98,888	82.11
Aksyon	Oscar Robes	19,554	16.24
Independent	Jesus D. Gonzales	1,255	1.04
Independent	Rene Aveallanosa	732	0.61
Total votes		129,630	100.00
Liberal hold			

== See also ==
- Legislative districts of Bulacan
- Legislative districts of San Jose del Monte
