= Wilhelmino Sy-Alvarado =

Filipino politician (born 1946)

The Honorable Wilhelmino Sy-Alvarado
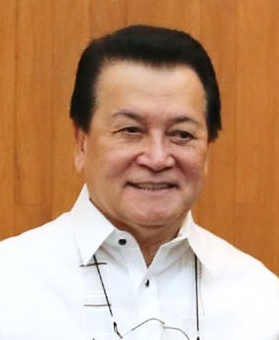
- Sy-Alvarado in 2017

33rd Governor of Bulacan
- In office June 30, 2010 – June 30, 2019
- Vice Governor: Daniel Fernando
- Preceded by: Joselito Mendoza
- Succeeded by: Daniel Fernando

Vice Governor of Bulacan
- In office June 30, 2019 – June 30, 2022
- Governor: Daniel Fernando
- Preceded by: Daniel Fernando
- Succeeded by: Alex Castro
- In office June 30, 2007 – June 30, 2010
- Governor: Joselito Mendoza
- Preceded by: Aurelio Plamenco
- Succeeded by: Daniel Fernando

Member of the Philippine House of Representatives from Bulacan's 1st district
- In office June 30, 1998 – June 30, 2007
- Preceded by: Teodulo Natividad
- Succeeded by: Ma. Victoria Sy-Alvarado

Mayor of Hagonoy, Bulacan
- In office 1986 (Note: Officer-in-charge from 1986 to 1987) – June 30, 1998
- Appointed by: Corazon Aquino
- Vice Mayor: Eling Laderas (1988–1995); Maria Santos (1995–1998)
- Preceded by: Hermie Perez
- Succeeded by: Felix Ople

Personal details
- Born: Wilhelmino Manucdoc Sy-Alvarado; December 29, 1946 (age 79) Hagonoy, Bulacan, Philippines
- Party: Reporma (2024–present)
- Other political affiliations: PDP–Laban (2021–2024); NUP (2011–2015; 2018–2021); Liberal (2015–2018); Lakas (2000–2011); LAMMP (1997–2000); LDP (1988–1997)
- Spouse: Maria Victoria Reyes
- Children: 7 (including Jose Antonio)
- Education: University of Santo Tomas (BS)

Wilhelmino "Willy" Manucdoc Sy-Alvarado (born December 29, 1946) is a Filipino politician and businessman serving as the governor of Bulacan from 2010 to 2019. He previously served as a Vice Governor of Bulacan from 2019 to 2022, then he served as the house representative for Bulacan's 1st congressional district from 1998 to 2007 and Hagonoy Mayor from 1986 to 1998.

== Early life ==
Wilhelmino Sy-Alvarado was born on December 29, 1946, in Barangay Santo Rosario, Hagonoy, Bulacan to Jose Sy-Alvarado and Angelina Manucdoc. He was a consistent elementary and high school valedictorian. He completed his high school education at Mayor Ramona S. Trillana High School (formerly Southern Institute) Class of 1963 in Hagonoy. He became a working student and earned his Bachelor of Science in commerce, major in Banking and Finance from the University of Santo Tomas, where he also earned units in Economics in 1967. He worked at Consolidated Bank for eleven years as a bookkeeper and as well involved in the aquaculture businesses, running a fishpond and sold bangus, shrimp, and crabs. He also worked as District Chairman of the Hagonoy Water District.

On August 21, 1983, the day former Sen. Benigno Aquino Jr. was assassinated, Sy-Alvarado and his wife Ma. Victoria helped feed those who attended the rallies denouncing the death of Aquino. He also participated during the campaign for the 1986 snap elections.

== Political career ==
=== Mayor of Hagonoy (1986–1998) ===
Sy-Alvarado entered politics when he was appointed as officer-in-charge mayor of Hagonoy, Bulacan by President Corazon Aquino through the help of Public Works and Highways Minister Rogaciano Mercado, also a former representative from Bulacan, in 1986. He was then elected in 1988 and served for three consecutive terms.

Within this period, Sy-Alvarado received the Pag-asa Award for Outstanding Public Official of the Philippines by the Civil Service Commission in 1992. As mayor, he was also the President of the Philippine Mayors League - Bulacan Chapter and the national Auditor of Philippine Mayors League.

=== Congressman (1998–2007) ===
Upon finishing his term as mayor, Sy-Alvarado ran for congressman of First District of Bulacan in 1998. He won by a landslide victory the same year, where he served in the House of Representatives for two more terms. He was re-elected in 2001 and in 2004, thus serving for nine years.

=== Vice Governor of Bulacan (2007–2010) ===
In the 2007 elections, Sy-Alvarado teamed-up with former Governor Roberto Pagdanganan. His wife, Ma. Victoria ran to keep his seat in the Congress. Although Pagdanganan lost to Jonjon Mendoza, he and his wife were successful.

=== Governor of Bulacan (2010–2019) ===
Prior to the 2010 local elections, Sy-Alvarado voluntarily retired from vice-governorship to run for governor. He challenged former governor Josefina Dela Cruz for the seat at the provincial elections. It was also during the gubernatorial feud between Roberto Pagdanganan and Jonjon Mendoza. His running mate was former board member and actor Daniel Fernando. In the elections, he won over Dela Cruz. In 2013, he ran unopposed. He was also appointed by then-President Benigno Aquino III as the Regional Development Council Chairman for Region III, serving from May 2014 to June 2016.

In 2016, he was re-elected, defeating Dela Cruz and San Miguel Mayor Roderick Tiongson.

=== Vice Governor of Bulacan (2019–2022) ===
Prior to the 2019 local elections, Sy-Alvarado switched places with incumbent vice-governor Daniel Fernando and ran for vice-governor as they are both term-limited; Fernando and Sy-Alvarado won the elections respectively, beating incumbent Malolos City mayor Christian Natividad and incumbent 5th District Board Member Josef Andrew Mendoza.

=== 2022 & 2025 gubernatorial bids ===
Sy-Alvarado ran for governor in 2022 under PDP–Laban, but lost to erstwhile long-time ally Governor Daniel Fernando. His running mate for vice governor was former Governor Jonjon Mendoza, who also lost.

He ran once again for governor in 2025 under Reporma, but still lost to Fernando.

== Personal life ==
Sy-Alvarado married Maria Victoria Reyes, whom he met while he was working full-time in the fishpond industry in 1976. They have seven children. She succeeded him and served as representative of the 1st district of Bulacan from 2007 to 2016.

== Notes ==
Political offices
Preceded by Hermie Perez	Mayor of Hagonoy, Bulacan; 1987–1998	Succeeded by Felix Ople
Preceded by Aurelio Plamenco	Vice Governor of Bulacan; 2007–2010	Succeeded by Daniel Fernando
Preceded by Joselito Mendoza	Governor of Bulacan; 2010–2019	Succeeded by Daniel Fernando
Preceded by Daniel Fernando	Vice Governor of Bulacan; 2019–2022	Succeeded by Alex Castro
House of Representatives of the Philippines
Preceded by Teodulo Natividad	Representative, 1st District of Bulacan; 1998–2007	Succeeded by Ma. Victoria Sy-Alvarado
