= Josefina dela Cruz =

Filipino politician and former Postmaster General

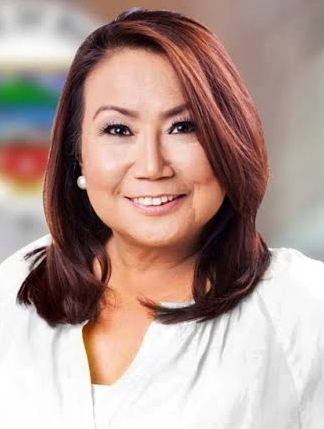

31st Governor of Bulacan
- In office June 30, 1998 – June 30, 2007
- Vice Governor: Aurelio Plamenco
- Preceded by: Roberto Pagdanganan
- Succeeded by: Joselito Andrew Mendoza

Postmaster General and CEO of the Philippine Postal Corporation
- In office July 2011 – 2016
- President: Benigno Aquino III

Vice Governor of Bulacan
- In office June 30, 1992 – June 30, 1998
- Governor: Roberto Pagdanganan
- Preceded by: Ramon Villarama
- Succeeded by: Aurelio Plamenco

Personal details
- Born: Josefina Mendoza; April 15, 1958 (age 68) Bocaue, Bulacan, Philippines
- Education: Ateneo de Manila University (BS, AB)
- Occupation: Politician, government executive

Josefina Mendoza-Dela Cruz (born February 24, 1958), commonly known as Josie Dela Cruz, is a Filipino politician and government executive. She served as the Governor of Bulacan from 1998 to 2007, making history as the first female governor of the province. She later served as the Postmaster General and Chief Executive Officer of the Philippine Postal Corporation from 2011 to 2016, also becoming the first woman to head the national postal agency.

== Early life and education ==
Dela Cruz was born on February 24, 1958, in the municipality of Bocaue, Bulacan. She pursued her higher education at the Ateneo de Manila University, where she graduated cum laude with a Bachelor of Science degree in Management Engineering in 1980. The following year, she completed a Bachelor of Arts degree in Psychology from the same institution, graduating magna cum laude.

== Political career ==
=== Local and provincial politics ===
Dela Cruz entered public service at the age of 21, when she was elected as the number one municipal councilor of Bocaue. Two years later, at the age of 23, she successfully ran for the office of Vice Mayor of the municipality. Continuing her ascent in local politics, she was elected as the youngest member of the Bulacan Provincial Board in 1988 at the age of 29.

In 1992, Dela Cruz was elected as the Vice Governor of Bulacan, becoming the first woman to hold the position. She served alongside then-Governor Roberto Pagdanganan and was re-elected for a second term in 1995.

=== Governor of Bulacan ===
In the 1998 Philippine local elections, Dela Cruz ran for the province's highest office and was elected as the Governor of Bulacan, securing approximately 345,000 votes. This victory marked her as the first female governor in the province's history.

She subsequently won re-election in 2001—garnering a reported 95 percent of the total votes cast—and secured her third and final consecutive term in 2004, serving until June 30, 2007.

As a local chief executive, Dela Cruz was recognized for reforming the provincial bureaucracy and implementing the "Constituent Responsive Governance Project." This initiative utilized public surveys and direct feedback to inform policy decisions and de-politicize infrastructure planning in the province.

== Postmaster General ==
In July 2011, Dela Cruz was appointed by President Benigno Aquino III as the Postmaster General and Chief Executive Officer of the Philippine Postal Corporation. She was the first female executive to lead the agency.

During her tenure, Dela Cruz oversaw a Rationalization Plan aimed at reorganizing and modernizing the state-owned postal service. Her administration, however, faced significant friction with postal worker unions. In 2012, labor leaders petitioned for a Senate investigation into her leadership, citing mass terminations of long-serving casual employees under the Rationalization Plan, unauthorized salary increases for executive positions, and concerns regarding the prospective privatization of postal assets. She concluded her term in 2016 at the end of the Aquino administration.

== Awards and honors ==
Dela Cruz has received multiple commendations for her decades in public service. Notably, during National Women's Month in 2025, she was honored by the Provincial Government of Bulacan as a recipient of the "Natatanging Babae" (Outstanding Woman) award, celebrating her pioneering achievements as a female local chief executive.
