= Arthur Robes =

Filipino politician (born 1963)

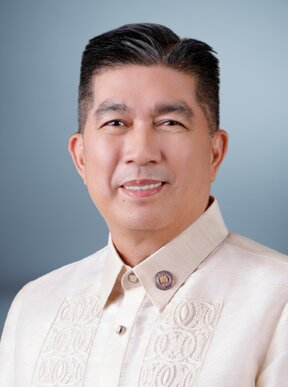
- Official portrait, 2026

Member of the Philippine House of Representatives from San Jose del Monte's at-large district
- Incumbent
- Assumed office June 30, 2025
- Preceded by: Florida Robes
- In office June 30, 2007 – June 30, 2016
- Preceded by: Eduardo Roquero
- Succeeded by: Florida Robes

24th Mayor of San Jose del Monte
- In office June 30, 2016 – June 30, 2025
- Vice Mayor: Efren Bartolome Jr.
- Preceded by: Reynaldo San Pedro
- Succeeded by: Florida Robes

Personal details
- Born: November 6, 1963 (age 62) Malabon, Rizal, Philippines
- Party: AR (local party; 2013–present); Lakas (2007–2010; 2023–present)
- Other political affiliations: KAMPI (2006–2007); Liberal (2010–2017); PDP-Laban (2017–2023)
- Spouse: Florida Perez Robes
- Children: 2
- Education: San Sebastian College – Recoletos (BS); Asian Institute of Management; University of the Philippines

Arturo "Arthur" Bardillón Robes is a Filipino politician who has been the representative for San Jose del Monte's at-large district since 2025. He previously held the seat from 2007 to 2016 and served as the mayor of San Jose del Monte from 2016 to 2025.

== Education ==
Robes graduated from the San Sebastián College – Recoletos with a Bachelor of Science in Commerce, major in Marketing, in 1998. After graduating, he took up a Management course at the Asian Institute of Management and at the University of the Philippines, as well as an Executive Course at the Development Academy of the Philippines.

== Political career ==
Robes is a member of the Lakas–CMD. He was first elected as representative of the lone district of San José del Monte in 2007, serving for three consecutive terms until 2016. During this time, he served as head of various committees, including the Committee on Women and Gender Equality, and Social Services.

In 2015, Robes was implicated in pork barrel scam allegations involving him and his wife, Florida. These allegations came to light around the same time as the Priority Development Assistance Fund (PDAF) scam. The whistleblower, Bernadette Ricalde, failed to establish a case as the Robes couple refuted her claims and accused Ricalde of being the one to misuse the pork barrel funds. Furthermore, Robes pointed a finger at lawyer Levito Baligod who just so happens to be known as the counsel of PDAF whistleblowers, for conspiring with Ricalde. Robes accused Baligod and Ricalde of conspiring on a politically motivated campaign to besmirch his name, alleging they were bankrolled by his political opponent Reynaldo San Pedro.

In the 2016 local elections, Robes ran and won against the incumbent San Pedro. He was reelected in 2019.

In November 2019, San José del Monte was awarded the Seal of Good Local Governance (SGLG) by the Department of Interior and Local Government (DILG).

== Personal life ==
He is married to the current City Mayor of San Jose del Monte, Florida "Rida" Lacsamana Pérez-Robes.

== Electoral history ==
Electoral history of Arthur Robes
Year	Office	Party		Votes received				Result
Year	Office	Local	National	Total	%	P.	Swing	Result
2007	Representative (San Jose del Monte at-large)	—N/a	KAMPI	55,278	—N/a	1st	—N/a	Won
2010	Representative (San Jose del Monte at-large)	—N/a	Lakas–Kampi	98,888	82.11%	1st	—N/a	Won
2013	Representative (San Jose del Monte at-large)	AR	Liberal	74,302	57.65%	1st	—N/a	Won
2025	Representative (San Jose del Monte at-large)	AR	Lakas	170,741	74.37%	1st	—N/a	Won
2016	Mayor of San Jose del Monte	AR	Liberal	83,148	50.16%	1st	—N/a	Won
2019	Mayor of San Jose del Monte	AR	PDP-Laban	98,808	57.04%	1st	—N/a	Won
2022	Mayor of San Jose del Monte	AR	PDP-Laban	150,394	71.12%	1st	—N/a	Won

House of Representatives of the Philippines
Preceded by Eduardo Roquero	Representative, San Jose del Monte City; 2007–2016	Succeeded by Florida Robes
Preceded by Florida Robes	Representative, San Jose del Monte City; 2025–present	Incumbent
Political offices
Preceded by Reynaldo San Pedro	Mayor of San Jose del Monte; 2016–2025	Succeeded by Florida Robes
