= Florida Robes =

Filipino politician (born 1971)

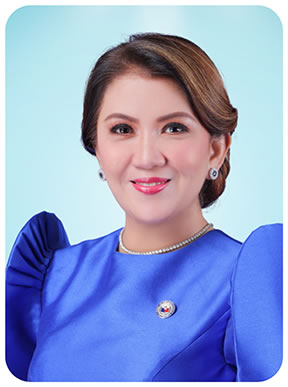
- Robes during the 19th Congress

25th Mayor of San Jose del Monte
- Incumbent
- Assumed office June 30, 2025
- Vice Mayor: Arlene Arciaga
- Preceded by: Arthur Robes

Member of the House of Representatives from San Jose del Monte's at-large district
- In office June 30, 2016 – June 30, 2025
- Preceded by: Arthur Robes
- Succeeded by: Arthur Robes

Personal details
- Born: Florida Lacsamana Perez; June 27, 1971 (age 55) Baguio, Philippines
- Party: PFP (2023–present); AR (local party; 2012–present)
- Other political affiliations: PDP-Laban (2017–2019; 2021–2023); NUP (2019–2021); Liberal (2015–2017)
- Spouse: Arthur Robes
- Children: 2
- Education: St. Paul College – Manila (BS); American University (MPA)
- Occupation: Politician

Florida "Rida" Perez-Robes (born Florida Lacsamana Perez; June 27, 1971) is a Filipino politician. She is currently serving as 25th Mayor of San Jose del Monte since 2025. She represented the San Jose del Monte's at-large district from 2016 to 2025.

== Early life and education ==
Robes was born on June 27, 1971, in Baguio. She studied St. Paul College – Manila with the degree of Hotel and Restaurant Management. She took up short courses in Harvard University. She finished her master's degree at the American University.

== Political career ==
=== 2013 San Jose del Monte mayoralty bid ===
In 2013, Robes ran as mayor of San Jose del Monte, but lost to incumbent Reynaldo San Pedro.

=== House of Representatives (2016–2025) ===
In 2016 elections, Robes was elected as representative for lone district of San Jose del Monte for three consecutive terms. As representative, she chaired the committees on Housing and Urban Development and Good Government and Public Accountability.

=== Mayor of San Jose del Monte (2025–present) ===
In 2025 elections, Robes was elected mayor of San Jose del Monte, swapping places with her husband. She is also concurrent National Treasurer of the League of Cities of the Philippines.

On August 23, 2026, Robes faced public backlash for berating audiences protesting water shortages and confronting 2nd District Councilor Ronalyn Pordan during a basketball game at the San Jose Del Monte Sports Complex. Pordan's party Akbayan condemned the encounter as political harassment, while Pordan denied orchestrating the protest. The city government defended Robes, stating that while they respect residents' right to express grievances, it must be done in a proper manner.

== Personal life ==
Robes is married to Arthur Robes and has two children.

== Electoral history ==
Electoral history of Florida Robes
Year	Office	Party		Votes received				Result
Year	Office	Local	National	Total	%	P.	Swing	Result
2013	Mayor of San Jose del Monte	AR	—N/a	39,323	31.86%	2nd	—N/a	Lost
2025	Mayor of San Jose del Monte	AR	PFP	126,920	51.39%	1st	—N/a	Won
2016	Representative (San Jose del Monte at-large)	AR	Liberal	83,945	52.58%	1st	—N/a	Won
2019	Representative (San Jose del Monte at-large)	AR	PDP–Laban	89,031	53.25%	1st	—N/a	Won
2022	Representative (San Jose del Monte at-large)	AR	PDP–Laban	136,680	64.21%	1st	—N/a	Won

== See also ==
- List of female members of the House of Representatives of the Philippines
