= Arangkada San Joseño =

Local political party in San Jose del Monte, Philippines

- Leader: Arthur Robes
- Spokesperson: Zosimo Lorenzo
- Founded: 2013
- Headquarters: City of San Jose del Monte
- Colors: Light pink, light orange
- City Mayor: 1 / 1
- City Vice Mayor: 1 / 1
- City Council: 10 / 12

Arangkada San Joseño (AR); English: Accelerate San Josean) is a local political party founded in San Jose del Monte, Bulacan by its leader, Arthur Robes.

== 2013 elections ==
Veteran singer Imelda Papin was disqualified from running for congresswoman in the city, as the party's secretary-general, Zosimo Lorenzo, filed a petition for disqualification as the member alleged that Papin was a resident of Barangay Putik, North Fairview, Quezon City. Even the COMELEC reversed the petition, the COMELEC proclaimed that Arthur Robes will be the winner of the 2013 elections, since he had 63.16% (74,302) votes than Papin's 31.90% (37,526) votes. Robes was a candidate of the Liberal Party at this time. His wife, Florida, failed to win the mayor seat, while being the party's standard bearer at the same time.

== 2016 elections ==
The party was successful in the elections because their standard bearer, Florida Robes won a congressional seat in its lone district, and their leader, Arthur Robes and his running mate, Efren Bartolome Jr, won their seats as mayor and vice-mayor, respectively. The party supported the two while they are candidates to the Liberal Party.

The party was named one of six major local parties by the Commission on Elections for the 2016 Philippine local elections. The major local parties are entitled to receive the 19th and 20th copies of the ERs and COCs in their respective provinces or regions.

== 2019 elections ==
Arthur Robes won his second term as the mayor San Jose del Monte in the 2019 elections, defeating the former mayor Reynaldo San Pedro, while becoming the party's standard bearer in the city. Efren Bartolome Jr. ran unopposed, gaining his second term and Florida Robes also won and gained her second term against Irene del Rosario in the congressional seat, being a candidate of PDP–Laban and the party supporting her.

== 2025 elections ==
Arthur Robes and Florida Robes were both term limited to run for re-election in their respective seats. They instead replaced each other’s seats, with Arthur running for the Lone District of San Jose del Monte, and Rida running for mayor respectively. Both won. Vice Mayor Efren Bartolome was also term limited, he instead ran for Provincial Board Member. His sister, Arlene Bartolome-Arciaga ran for vice mayor and won against city councillor Janet Reyes and former city councillor Irene del Rosario.

Arangkada San Joseño also fielded candidates for city councillors in both 1st and 2nd districts of San Jose del Monte. They won 10/12 seats as a whole.
