= The Best of Michael Martin Murphey =

Greatest hits album by Michael Martin Murphey
- Released: 1984
- Genre: Country
- Length: 49:20
- Label: EMI America
- Producer: Jim Ed Norman

Michael Martin Murphey chronology
The Heart Never Lies (1983)	The Best of Michael Martin Murphey (1984)	Tonight We Ride (1986)

The Best of Michael Martin Murphey is the first compilation album by the American singer-songwriter Michael Martin Murphey. It was released in 1985 via EMI America Records. The album includes the singles "What She Wants" and "Carolina in the Pines", a re-recording of the 1975 hit which made the Top 10 on the Hot Country Songs chart. "Geronimo's Cadillac", "Wildfire" and "Cherokee Fiddle" are also re-recordings of the original A&M & Epic tracks.

== Track listing ==
No.	Title	Writer(s)	Length
1.	"Carolina in the Pines"	Michael Martin Murphey	4:08
2.	"Geronimo's Cadillac"	Murphey, Charles John Quarto	5:25
3.	"Cherokee Fiddle"	Murphey	5:36
4.	"Still Taking Chances"	Murphey	4:40
5.	"What's Forever For"	Rafe Van Hoy	2:49
6.	"Wildfire"	Murphey, Larry Cansler	5:06
7.	"What She Wants"	Kerry Chater, Renee Armand	3:44
8.	"Love Affairs"	Murphey, Mike d'Abo	3:32
9.	"Disenchanted"	Murphey, Jim Ed Norman, Chick Rains	4:33
10.	"Don't Count the Rainy Days"	Wayland Holyfield, Jerry Careaga	3:23
11.	"Will It Be Love by Morning"	Lewis Anderson, Fred Koller	2:24
12.	"Radio Land"	Murphey, Norman, Rains	4:00

== Chart performance ==
Chart (1984)	Peak position
US Top Country Albums (Billboard)	20
