= Maybe This Time =

Maybe This Time may refer to:

- "Maybe This Time" (Kander and Ebb song), popularized by Liza Minnelli in the 1972 film Cabaret
- Maybe This Time (1980 film), an Australian production starring Judy Morris
- "Maybe This Time" (Michael Martin Murphey song), 1983
- Maybe This Time (TV series), a 1995 American sitcom
- Maybe This Time (2014 film), a Filipino romantic comedy
