= 2025 Malolos local elections =

Local elections in the Philippines

2025 Malolos mayoral elections
- May 12, 2025
- Registered: 135,662
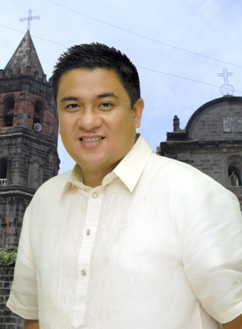
Candidate	Christian Natividad
Party	NUP
Popular vote	97,706
Percentage	100.00%
Mayor before election
Christian Natividad
PDP
Elected mayor
Christian Natividad
NUP
- 2025 Malolos vice mayoral elections
- May 12, 2025
- Registered: 135,662
Candidate	Gilbert Gatchalian	Migs Tengco Bautista	Kiko Castro
Party	Independent	NUP	Independent
Popular vote	47,905	37,264	25,271
Percentage	43.38%	33.74%	22.88%
Vice Mayor before election
Migs Bautista
Aksyon
Elected Vice Mayor
Gilbert Gatchalian
Independent
- 2025 Malolos city council election
- May 12, 2025
Party	Vote %	Seats	+/–
NUP	65.14	7	+2
Independent	29.06	3	+3
This lists parties that won seats. See the complete results below.

Local elections were held in Malolos, Bulacan on May 12, 2025, as part of the 2025 Philippine general election. The capital city of the province of Bulacan, Malolos' incumbent local executive, the National Unity Party's nominee Christian "Agila" Natividad was re-elected to his second-consecutive term unopposed. This is Natividad's fifth cumulative term as Mayor of Malolos after previously serving from 2010 to 2019.

Natividad's running mate however, incumbent city vice mayor Migs Tengco Bautista lost his re-election bid to former Mayor and previously vice Mayor Engr. Gilbert Gatchalian by a 10,000-vote margin. Gatchalian defeated Bautista and term-limited councilor Kiko Castro for the vice-mayoral position.

The 2025 local race marks the return of the Natividad-Gatchalian tandem as the local executives of the City of Malolos, a tandem that had previously been a team during their first nine-years from 2010 to 2019. Gatchalian replaced Natividad—who ran Governor of Bulacan in 2019 but lost—and served a three-year term as Mayor before he was defeated by Natividad in his political comeback in 2022. Meanwhile, the Malolos city council is also packed with Natividad's slate with seven of the ten seats being occupied by "One Malolos" the alliance name under the Natividad-Bautista slate. Two seats were filled by Gatchalian's candidates from "Bayanihan Generation" and the remaining seat was the re-electionist Mikki Soto who was running with the aforementioned Kiko Castro.

== Background ==
In 2022, former gubernatorial-candidate and mayor Christian Natividad won his first non-consecutive term as Mayor of Malolos, defeating the provincial-backed candidate and then-outgoing Mayor Bebong Gatchalian. Largely considered as a swing city—where voters would tend to either side with the administration or largely support the opposition during elections—the local leaders under Malolos tends to be of support to the administration during the last and this years election. President Bongbong Marcos won Malolos with 60,991 votes to former Vice President Leni Robredo's 37,667, and then-Davao city Mayor Sara Duterte won 53,333 votes to then-Senate President Tito Sotto's 26,808 votes. Robredo's running mate Francis Pangilinan placed third with 23,030 votes behind Sotto.

== Coalitions ==
In adherence to the nationwide filing of certificates of candidacies, the filings were conducted on October 1 to 8, 2024 from which local slates were formalized and announced. Generally, the venue of the COC filings occurred in downtown Malolos.

=== One Malolos ===
Incumbent city Mayor Christian Natividad and incumbent city vice mayor Migs Tengco Bautista are seeking re-election bids for their respective positions under the National Unity Party-backed One Malolos. The ticket is supported by a ten-member city council slate, of which three are running for re-election: Councilors JV Vitug, Troi Aldaba, and Dennis San Diego.

The One Malolos slate is considerably filled with several candidates who previously ran in the 2022 local race including Geli Bulaong, Miel Agustin, and Jun Cruz who were under the same banner as Natividad in 2022 but lost the election. There are new candidates seeking a political comeback including former councilor Poncho Arcega who ran and lost for a second-term in 2022, and former vice mayor Len Pineda who lost his bid for re-election as vice mayor in 2022 to former opponent-now-ally Migs Bautista. Under the same slate, two new candidates emerged for a chance to win a seat in the local city council, Atty. Muchas Absalon and Barangay Tikay chairman Jawo Hernandez.

=== Bayanihan Generation ===
The former coalition of Governor Daniel Fernando continued into the local scene where former mayor and coalition member Gilbert Gatchalian is seeking a political comeback. Gatchalian lost his bid for re-election in 2022 to Natividad who made his own political comeback after his 2019 lost as Governor to the aforementioned Fernando. Now in 2025, Gatchalian is running for Vice Mayor.

Under the coalition however are only three candidates for the city council. Re-electionist councilor Ega Domingo who is vying for his third and final term and former councilors Rico Capule and Toots Bautista.

=== Team Kiko Castro ===
The term-limited councilor Kiko Castro declared his run for vice mayor for the 2025 race. Castro had been the number-one vote getter for the city council of Malolos in three-consecutive elections in 2016, 2019 and 2022. Castro is running with re-electionist Mikki Soto who is vying for his third and final term as city councilor for Malolos. Soto was elected to the council in 2019 as the tenth and final member while was re-elected in 2022 as number 5.

== Tickets ==
One Malolos has been slated under the administration-backed coalition as its primary party, the NUP is under the Alyansa para sa Bagong Pilipinas coalition of parties for this year's midterm elections.

=== Administration backed-coalition ===
One Malolos
Position	#	Candidate	Party
Mayor	1	Christian Natividad	NUP
Vice Mayor	1	Migs Tengco Bautista	NUP
Councilor	1	Atty. Muchas Absalon	NUP
Councilor	2	Miel Agustin	NUP
Councilor	3	Troi Aldaba	NUP
Councilor	4	Poncho Arcega	NUP
Councilor	6	Coach Geli Bulaong	NUP
Councilor	8	ABC Jun Cruz	NUP
Councilor	12	Jawo Hernandez	NUP
Councilor	15	Len Noel Pineda	NUP
Councilor	16	Dennis Konde San Diego	NUP
Councilor	18	JV Vitug	NUP

=== Other tickets ===
Bayanihan Generation
Position	#	Candidate	Party
Vice Mayor	3	Gilbert Gatchalian	Independent
Councilor	5	Toots Bautista	Independent
Councilor	7	Rico RC Capule	Independent
Councilor	10	Ega Mr. Rescue Domingo	Independent

Team Kiko Castro
Position	#	Candidate	Party
Vice Mayor	2	Kiko Castro	Independent
Councilor	17	Mikki Soto	Independent

None affiliated candidates
Position	#	Candidate	Party
Councilor	9	Batang Malolos Cruz	PFP
Councilor	11	Mark MG Garchitorena	Independent
Councilor	13	Kuyang Wili Jimenez	Independent

== Mayoral election ==
Incumbent city mayor Christian Natividad, who has served since 2022 was re-elected to his second-consecutive term as Mayor of Malolos and his fifth cumulative term, making his total years in the city hall at max fifteen years following his unopposed win.

=== Results ===
Candidate	Party	Votes	%
Christian Natividad	NUP	97,706	100.00
Total		97,706	100.00
Valid votes		97,706	85.76
Invalid/blank votes		16,222	14.24
Total votes		113,928	100.00
Registered voters/turnout		135,662	83.98
NUP hold			
Source: Commission on Elections

== Vice mayoral election ==
Former mayor Gilbert Gatchalian won the vice-mayoral race in the city of Malolos, a position he held from 2010 to 2019 before ascending to the mayoral seat in the 2019 race. Gatchalian defeated incumbent vice mayor Migs Bautista and term-limited councilor Kiko Castro.

=== Results ===
Candidate	Party	Votes	%
Gilbert Gatchalian	Independent	47,905	43.38
Migs Tengco Bautista	NUP	37,264	33.74
Kiko Castro	Independent	25,271	22.88
Total		110,440	100.00
Valid votes		110,440	96.94
Invalid/blank votes		3,488	3.06
Total votes		113,928	100.00
Registered voters/turnout		135,662	83.98
Independent gain from NUP			
Source: Commission on Elections

== City council election ==
Seven out of the ten seats in the city council were candidates of incumbent Mayor Natividad while five of its members were for re-election. Two of the ten were won by Bayanihan Generation, and the remaining seat was one by Mikki Soto.

Party	Votes	%	Seats
National Unity Party	521,247	65.14	7
Partido Federal ng Pilipinas	30,174	3.77	0
Independent	248,775	31.09	3
Ex officio seats			2
Total	800,196	100.00	12

Candidates with italicized names denotes that they are incumbent city councilors.

Candidate	Party	Votes	%
JV Vitug	NUP	70,435	8.80
Dennis Konde San Diego	NUP	65,416	8.17
Coach Geli Bulaong	NUP	63,198	7.90
Ega Mr. Rescue Domingo	Independent	59,899	7.49
Troi Aldaba	NUP	58,493	7.31
Poncho Arcega	NUP	57,341	7.17
Miel Agustin	NUP	56,833	7.10
Mikki Soto	Independent	54,704	6.84
Len Noel Pineda	NUP	49,342	6.17
Toots Bautista	Independent	48,456	6.06
ABC Jun Cruz	NUP	48,421	6.05
Rico RC Capule	Independent	36,226	4.53
Batang Malolos Cruz	PFP	30,174	3.77
Atty. Muchas Absalon	NUP	27,267	3.41
Jawo Hernandez	NUP	24,501	3.06
Mark MG Garchitorena	Independent	21,756	2.72
Kiko Nicolas	Independent	16,213	2.03
Kuyang Wili Jimenez	Independent	11,521	1.44
Total		800,196	100.00
Valid votes		800,196	70.24
Invalid/blank votes		339,084	29.76
Total votes		1,139,280	100.00
Registered voters/turnout		1,356,620	83.98
NUP plurality			
Source: Commission on Elections

== National election results ==
The national election was also conducted in the city of Malolos and its registered voters where all must vote for senators, district representatives, and their local sangguniang panlalawigan body and its Governor and Vice Governor.

=== Senate ===
In the senatorial race, former senator Bam Aquino won the most votes from the city of Malolos with 66,868 votes then Francis Pangilinan and Bong Go.

The following are the top twenty-senatorial candidates who received the most votes in the City of Malolos with those highlighted being part of the top twelve nationwide. Among the twelve elected senators, only nine candidates were included in the Top Fifteen in Malolos. Just outside of the top fifteen was senator Imee Marcos at seventeenth (22,191), Lito Lapid at nineteenth (21,885), and Camille Villar at thirty-fourth (11,873).

Candidate	Party	Votes	%
Bam Aquino	KNP	66,868	6.79
Francis Pangilinan	Liberal	48,987	4.97
Bong Go	PDP	45,244	4.59
Tito Sotto	NPC	43,958	4.46
Panfilo Lacson	Independent	39,626	4.02
Heidi Mendoza	Independent	39,037	3.96
Colonel Bosita	Independent	36,249	3.68
Erwin Tulfo	Lakas-CMD	33,122	3.36
Pia Cayetano	Nacionalista	31,277	3.18
Bato Dela Rosa	PDP	28,275	2.87
Luke Espiritu	PLM	28,010	2.84
Benhur Abalos	PFP	27,449	2.79
Danilo Ramos	Makabayan	26,023	2.64
Ben Bitag Tulfo	Independent	25,786	2.62
Rodante Marcoleta	Independent	24,998	2.54
Others		439,821	44.66
Total		984,730	100.00
Registered voters/turnout		135,662	–
Source: Commission on Elections

=== Party-list ===
In the party-list race, the Akbayan party-list garnered the most votes in the race with 16,121 votes, nearly 9,000 votes ahead of second place CWS and followed by CIBAC and APAT-DAPAT.

=== House of Representatives ===
The city of Malolos is under the congressional jurisdiction of Bulacan's First District. Incumbent representative Danilo Domingo won the city of Malolos by an overwhelming margin against his closest competitor, term-limited board Member Allan Andan.

Candidate	Party	Votes	%
Danny Domingo	NUP	90,430	83.40
Allan Andan	Aksyon	16,753	15.45
Joselito Pinlac	Independent	1,247	1.15
Total		108,430	100.00
Registered voters/turnout		135,662	–
Source: Commission on Elections

== Provincial-level races ==
=== Gubernatorial and vice-gubernatorial races ===
Incumbent governor and vice governor Daniel Fernando and Alex Castro both received overwhelming victories in the city of Malolos. Fernando received 76,771 votes or 72.61% of all votes obtained by all candidates while Castro received an even bigger 91,382 votes or 89.24%.

Candidate	Party	Votes	%
Daniel Fernando	NUP	76,771	72.61
Bogs Violago	PFP	12,903	12.20
Wilhelmino Sy-Alvarado	PDR	12,901	12.20
Melissa Aquino	Independent	2,053	1.94
Kuya Jay Ocampo	Independent	715	0.68
Climate De Guzman	Independent	393	0.37
Total		105,736	100.00
Registered voters/turnout		135,662	–
Source: Commission on Elections

Candidate	Party	Votes	%
Alex Castro	NUP	91,382	89.24
Elmer Paguio	PFP	6,564	6.41
Allan Villena	Independent	3,033	2.96
Efren Milanes	Independent	856	0.84
Manoy Tomagan	Independent	569	0.56
Total		102,404	100.00
Registered voters/turnout		135,662	–
Source: Commission on Elections

=== Provincial Board Member ===
In the provincial board member race, the top four candidates are all incumbent councilors for the city of Malolos. Topping the tally is Ninong Michael Aquino, followed by Atorni Niño Bautista, Noel Sacay, and Ayee Ople.

Candidate	Party	Votes	%
Ninong Michael Aquino	NUP	50,918	28.12
Atorni Nino Bautista	PFP	42,009	23.20
Noel Sacay	NPC	26,625	14.70
Ayee Ople	PFP	26,174	14.45
Mina Fermin	Independent	24,219	13.37
James Santos	NUP	8,095	4.47
Bong Laderas	Independent	1,677	0.93
Ryan Abueg	Independent	1,373	0.76
Total		181,090	100.00
Registered voters/turnout		135,662	–
Source: Commission on Elections

== See also ==
- 2025 Philippine general election
- 2025 Bulacan local elections
