= Alex Castro =

Filipino singer, actor, model, and politician

The Honorable Alex Castro
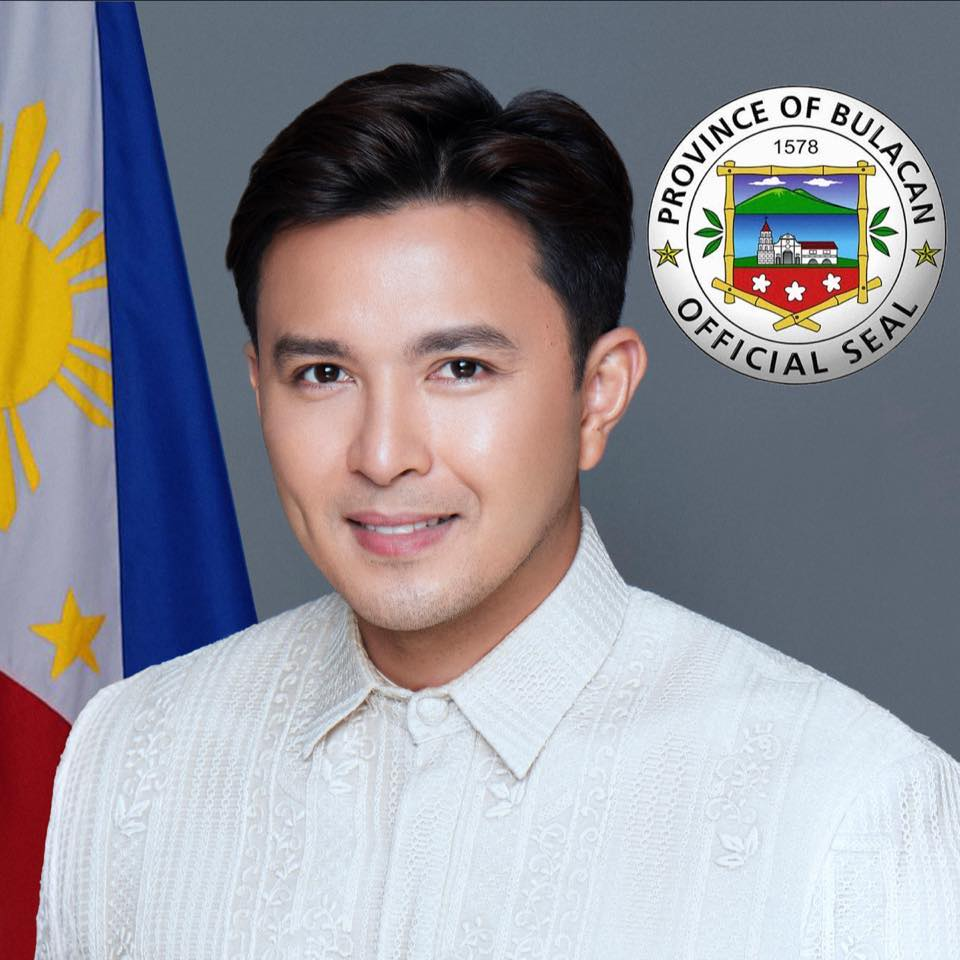
- Official portrait, 2025

Vice Governor of Bulacan
- Incumbent
- Assumed office June 30, 2022
- Governor: Daniel Fernando
- Preceded by: Wilhelmino Sy-Alvarado
Concurrent positions
Regional Chairman of the League of Vice Governors of the Philippines for Region III
Incumbent
Assumed office July 2022
National Chairman of the National Movement of Young Legislators
Incumbent
Assumed office July 1, 2022
| Preceded by | Jolo Revilla |

Member of the Bulacan Provincial Board from the 4th District
- In office June 30, 2016 – June 30, 2022
Concurrent positions
Assistant Secretary General of the National Movement of Young Legislators
In office
July 1, 2019 – June 30, 2022
President of the National Movement of Young Legislators for Region III
In office
July 1, 2016 – June 30, 2019

Member of the Marilao Municipal Council
- In office June 30, 2007 – June 30, 2013

Sangguniang Kabataan Federation President of Marilao Sectoral Representative at the Marilao Municipal Council
- In office August 15, 2002 – November 30, 2007

Sangguniang Kabataan Chairman of Barangay Lias, Marilao, Bulacan
- In office August 15, 2002 – November 30, 2007

Personal details
- Born: Alexis Collera Castro; September 27, 1985 (age 41) Quezon City, Philippines
- Party: NUP (2018–present)
- Other political affiliations: NPC (2015–2018); Liberal (2007–2015)
- Spouse: Sunshine Garcia (m. 2019)
- Children: 2
- Education: Far Eastern University (BS)
- Occupation: Model, Actor, Singer, Politician

Alexis Collera Castro (born September 27, 1985) is a Filipino model, singer, actor and politician currently serving as the Vice Governor of Bulacan since 2022. He is previously a member of the Bulacan Provincial Board from the 4th district from 2016 to 2022. He also served as a municipal councilor of Marilao from 2007 to 2013 and chairman of Sangguniang Kabataan in Barangay Lias, Marilao from 2002 to 2007. As a talent, he signed with GMA Network, yet later transferred to its rival network ABS-CBN, then returned to GMA after eleven years.

== Early life ==
Castro was born on September 27, 1985, in Quezon City to Angel Gonzales Castro and Susan Collera Castro. His family moved to Marilao, Bulacan during his childhood. He graduated from pre-school and elementary school at the St. Michael School of Marilao. He later completed his high school education at the Jesus is Lord Colleges Foundation in Bocaue.

== Political career ==
In 2002, at age 17, Castro was elected Sangguniang Kabataan (SK) chairman of Barangay Lias, Marilao, Bulacan. Not long after, he was elected as the SK Federation president of Marilao, making him an ex-officio member of the Sangguniang Bayan of Marilao. He was awarded as the “Most Outstanding SK Federation President” and with the Gintong Kabataan Award in the Gintong Kabataan Awards in 2005. While fulfilling his duties, he obtained his Bachelor of Science in Mass Communication degree from the Far Eastern University in 2006.

In 2007, he was eventually elected as the youngest municipal councilor of Marilao. He was re-elected in 2010, the same year that he was conferred as 2010 Gawad Galing Sanggunian's “Outstanding Councilor in Bulacan”. Two years later, he was again recognized as “Outstanding Councilor in the Philippines” by the People’s Choice Awards for 2013. Also, in 2024 he was one of the most recognized as "Most Influential and Out Standing Advocate for Good Governance" at Asia's Influential leader Awards. In 2013, he unsuccessfully ran for vice mayor of Marilao as the running mate of Tito Santiago, the outgoing vice mayor who was eventually elected as mayor.

He was elected to the Bulacan Provincial Board as a member from the 4th district in 2016. During his first term, he was concurrently serving as the President of National Movement of Young Legislators (NMYL) for Region III. He was then re-elected in 2019 and was named as NMYL's National Assistant Secretary General early in his second term. He was awarded by Gawad Filipino as the Outstanding Public Servant of the Year in 2021.

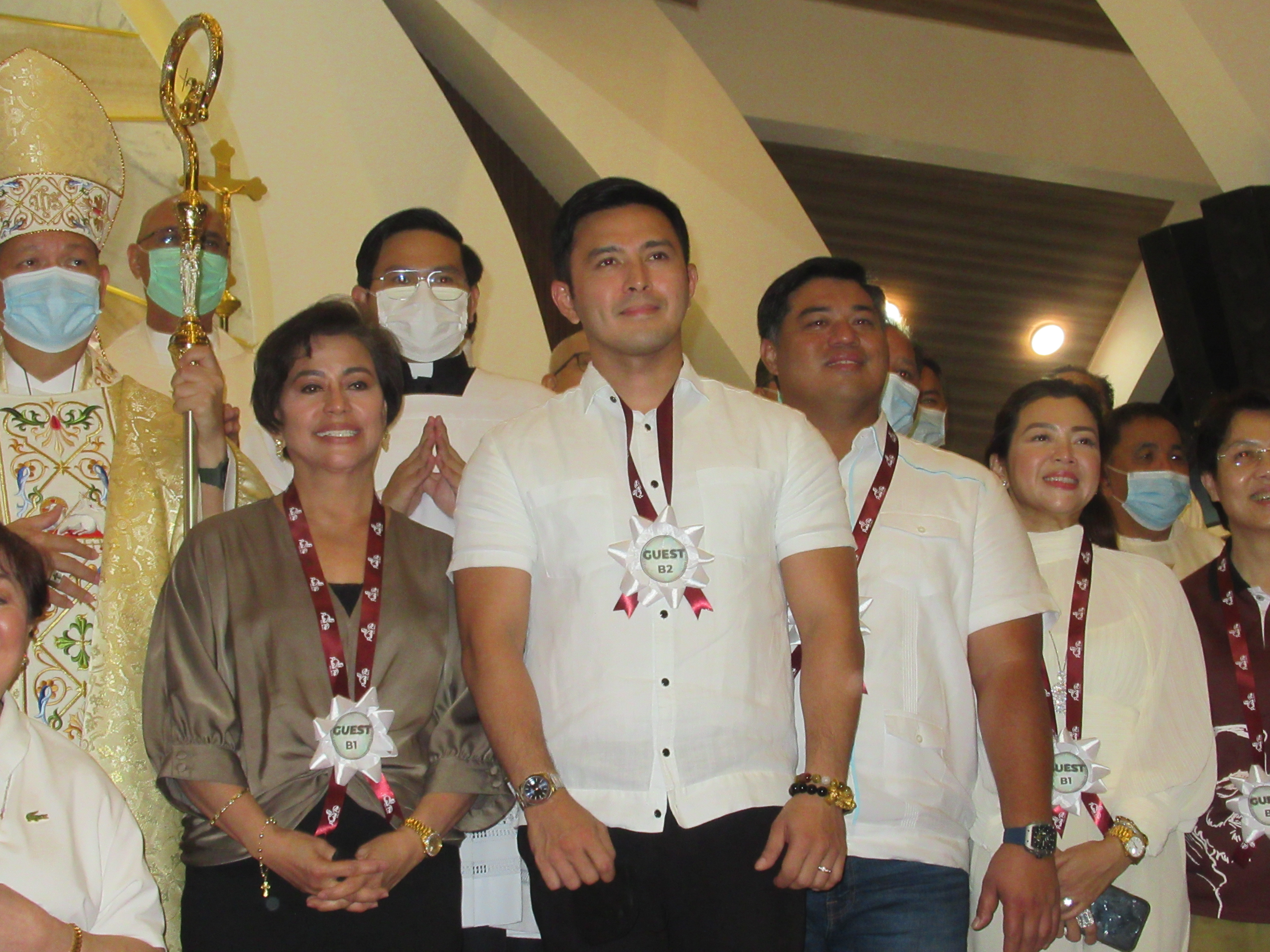
Castro and Baliuag Mayor Ferdie Estrella during the solemn dedication of Saint Padre Pio of Pietrelcina Chapel in 2024

He ran for vice governor of Bulacan in 2022 as the running mate of incumbent governor Daniel Fernando and they both won. He was named as the National Chairman of NMYL and the Regional Chairman of the League of Vice Governors of the Philippines for Central Luzon for 2022–2025.

=== Legal issue ===
On May 6, 2024, whistleblower “Francisco Balagtas” filed with the Ombudsman a 3-page complaint dated May 1, 2024, against Daniel Fernando, Castro, other local officials, including TCSC Corporation’s owners-officers Dionisio Toreja, President, Engr. Bernie Pacheco, Vice President for Mining, and others. The corruption case stemmed from the alleged anomalous ₱500 million Bulacan Flood Control and River Restoration Project, including TCSC's Bulacan dredging projects.

== Contestant at Are You The Next Big Star? ==
Castro contested Are You the Next Big Star? on GMA Network in 2009. He advanced to the final round alongside Camille Cortez, Geoff Taylor, and Frencheska Farr, who would eventually won the contest.

=== Performances/results ===
| Week # | Song choice | Original artist | Order # | Result |
|---|---|---|---|---|
| Top 16 | "This Love" | Maroon 5 | 15 | Safe |
| Top 14 | "Sabihin Mo Na" | Top Suzara | 8 | Safe |
| Top 12 | "Panakip Butas" | Hajji Alejandro | 11 | Safe |
| Top 10 | "You Are Not Alone" | Michael Jackson | 2 | Safe |
| Top 8 | "Nandito Ako" | Ogie Alcasid | 3 | Safe |
| Top 7 | "Basang-Basa Sa Ulan" | Aegis | 4 | Bottom 2 |
| Top 6 | "Narda" (performed with Gian Magdangal) | Kamikazee | 1 | Safe |
| Top 4 | "Huling El Bimbo" "I'll Be There for You" "Awit ng Kabataan" | Eraserheads; Bon Jovi; Rivermaya | 4; 2; 4 | Runner-Up |

== Filmography ==
=== Television ===
| Year | Title | Role |
|---|---|---|
| 2009 | Are You the Next Big Star? | Himself / Finalist |
| 2009 | SOP Fully Charged | Himself / Performer |
| 2010 | Your Song Presents: Maling Akala | Lawrence Peseta |
| 2010 | Wansapanataym: Zoila's Valentina | Robert / Bobot |
| 2011 | Precious Hearts Romances Presents: Mana Po | Bob |
| 2011 | Mula sa Puso | Thaddeus |
| 2011 | Reputasyon | Manuel |
| 2011 | Wansapanataym: Darmo Adarna | Migs |
| 2011 | ASAP | Himself / co-host |
| 2012 | Mundo Man ay Magunaw | Mike Sarmiento |
| 2012 | Kahit Puso'y Masugatan | Christian Morales |
| 2012 | Maalaala Mo Kaya: Gong | Eddie |
| 2012 | Precious Hearts Romances Presents: Paraiso | Albert Ramirez |
| 2012 | Wansapanataym: I'll Be Home For Christmas | Joseph |
| 2013 | Wansapanataym: Si Paolo At Si Apollo | Apollo |
| 2013 | Maalaala Mo Kaya: Dream House | Luis |
| 2013 | Annaliza | Cedrick Francisco |
| 2013 | Maria Mercedes | Anthony Figueras |
| 2014 | Moon of Desire | Diego |
| 2014 | Maalaala Mo Kaya: Kumot | Crizaldu |
| 2015 | Maalaala Mo Kaya: Pagkain | Clyde |
| 2015 | Pasión de Amor | Gelo Corpuz |
| 2015 | Wattpad Presents: Jenny and The Magic Arinola | Laxus The Genie |
| 2015 | LolaBasyang.com Presents: Ang Mahiwagang Kuba | Johnny |
| 2015 | Walang Iwanan | Father Chito |
| 2016 | Maalaala Mo Kaya: Pasa | Jonjon |
| 2016 | Doble Kara | Victor |
| 2017 | Maalaala Mo Kaya: Tahanan | Josue |
| 2017 | Ikaw Lang ang Iibigin | young Joey |
| 2017 | Wildflower | Rufo |
| 2018 | Maalaala Mo Kaya: Manibela | Marvin |
| 2018 | Precious Hearts Romances Presents: Los Bastardos | young Fausto Davide |
| 2018 | Ipaglaban Mo: Abogada | Noel Valeroso |
| 2019 | Maalaala Mo Kaya: Medalya | Alvin |
| 2019 | The Killer Bride | young Jacobo Dela Torre |
| 2019 | The Haunted | Bernard Robles Jr. |
| 2020 | Ipaglaban Mo: Himlayan | Antonio Yulo |
| 2020 | Ang sa Iyo ay Akin | young Francis Angeles |
| 2020 | Walang Hanggang Paalam | young Nick |
| 2021 | Artikulo 247 | Alexander |
| 2026 | Sigabo | RJ Jacinto |

=== Film ===
| Year | Title | Role |
|---|---|---|
| 2008 | My Best Friend's Girlfriend | Jun |
| 2008 | Manay Po 2: Overload | Rainier |
| 2008 | One True Love | Mike |
| 2008 | Desperadas 2 | Norman |
| 2012 | Shake, Rattle & Roll 14 | Private Hilario Tabios |
| 2013 | The Bride and the Lover | Matteo |
| 2013 | Call Center Girl | Martin |
| 2014 | Maybe This Time | Patrick |
| 2014 | Somebody to Love | Rainier |
| 2015 | Resureksyon | Ramil |

== Personal life ==
Castro is married to former SexBomb Girls dancer Sunshine Garcia since March 2019 almost two years after their engagement. He has two sons.

Political offices
| Preceded by Wilhelmino Sy-Alvarado | Vice Governor of Bulacan; 2022–present | Incumbent |
