= Bulacan Provincial Board =

Legislative body of the province of Bulacan, Philippines

Bulacan Provincial Board Sangguniang Panlalawigan ng Bulacan
- 12th Sangguniang Panlalawigan

Type
- Type: Unicameral
- Term limits: 3 terms (9 years)

Leadership
- Presiding Officer: Alexis Castro, NUP since June 30, 2022

Structure
- Seats: 18 board members 1 ex officio presiding officer
- Political groups: NUP (8) PFP (2) Lakas (2) AR (1) NPC (1) Independent (1) Nonpartisan (3)
- Length of term: 3 years
- Authority: Local Government Code of the Philippines

Elections
- Voting system: Plurality-at-large (regular members); Indirect election (ex officio members); Acclamation (sectoral member)
- Last election: May 12, 2025
- Next election: May 15, 2028

Meeting place
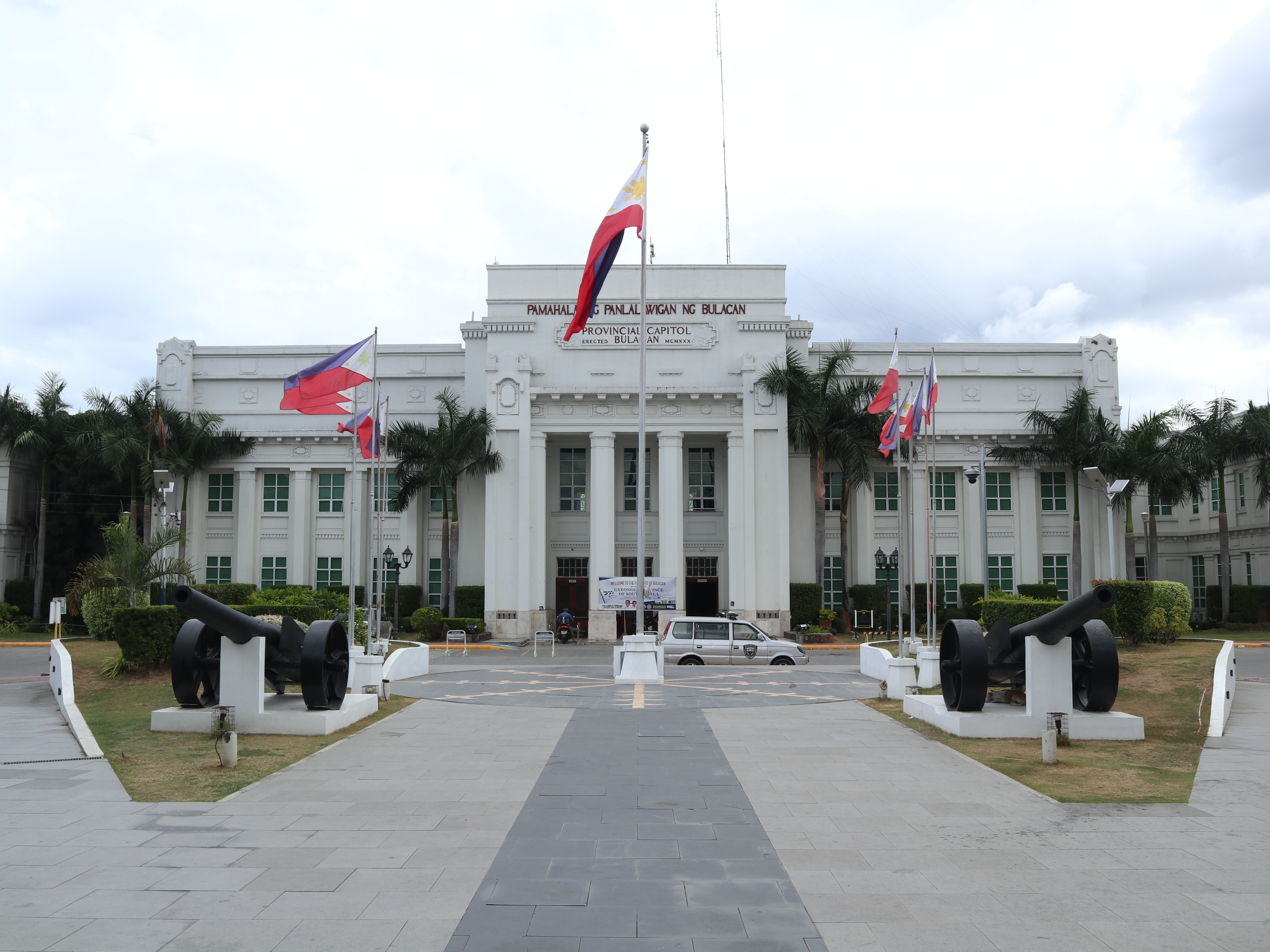
- Benigno S. Aquino Jr. Hall, Bulacan Provincial Capitol, Malolos

Website
- sp.bulacan.gov.ph

The Bulacan Provincial Board is the Sangguniang Panlalawigan (provincial legislature) of the Philippine province of Bulacan.

The members are elected via plurality-at-large voting: the province is divided into six Sangguniang Panlalawigan districts, and each district send two members since 2022; the number of candidates the electorate votes for and the number of winning candidates depends on the number of members their district sends. The vice governor is the ex officio presiding officer, and only votes to break ties. The vice governor is elected via the plurality voting system province-wide.

The districts used in appropriation of members is coextensive with the legislative districts of Bulacan, with the exception that the Legislative district of San Jose del Monte being a part of the 4th provincial board district until 2025.

== District apportionment ==
Elections	No. of seats per district							Ex officio seats	Reserved seats	Total seats
Elections	1st	2nd	3rd	4th	5th	6th	SJDM	Ex officio seats	Reserved seats	Total seats
2004–16	3	2	2	3	—	—	—	3	0	13
2017–21	3	2	2	3	—	—	—	3	1	14
2022–24	2	2	2	2	2	2	—	3	1	16
2025–beyond	2	2	2	2	2	2	2	3	1	18

In May 2024, the Supreme Court ordered the addition of two seats in the Board for San Jose del Monte following a petition by Representative Florida Robes.

== List of members ==
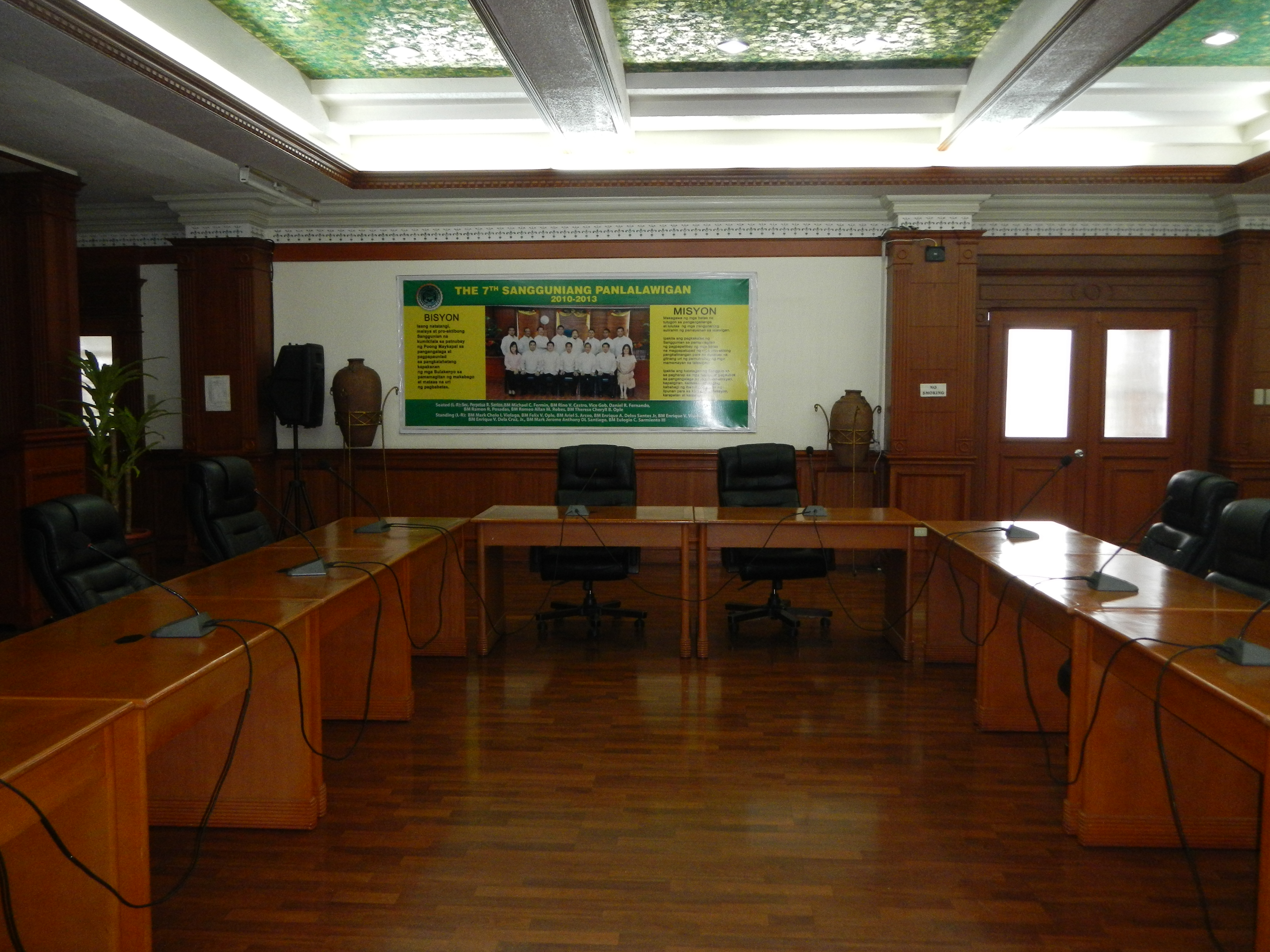
BPB Session Hall, 2013

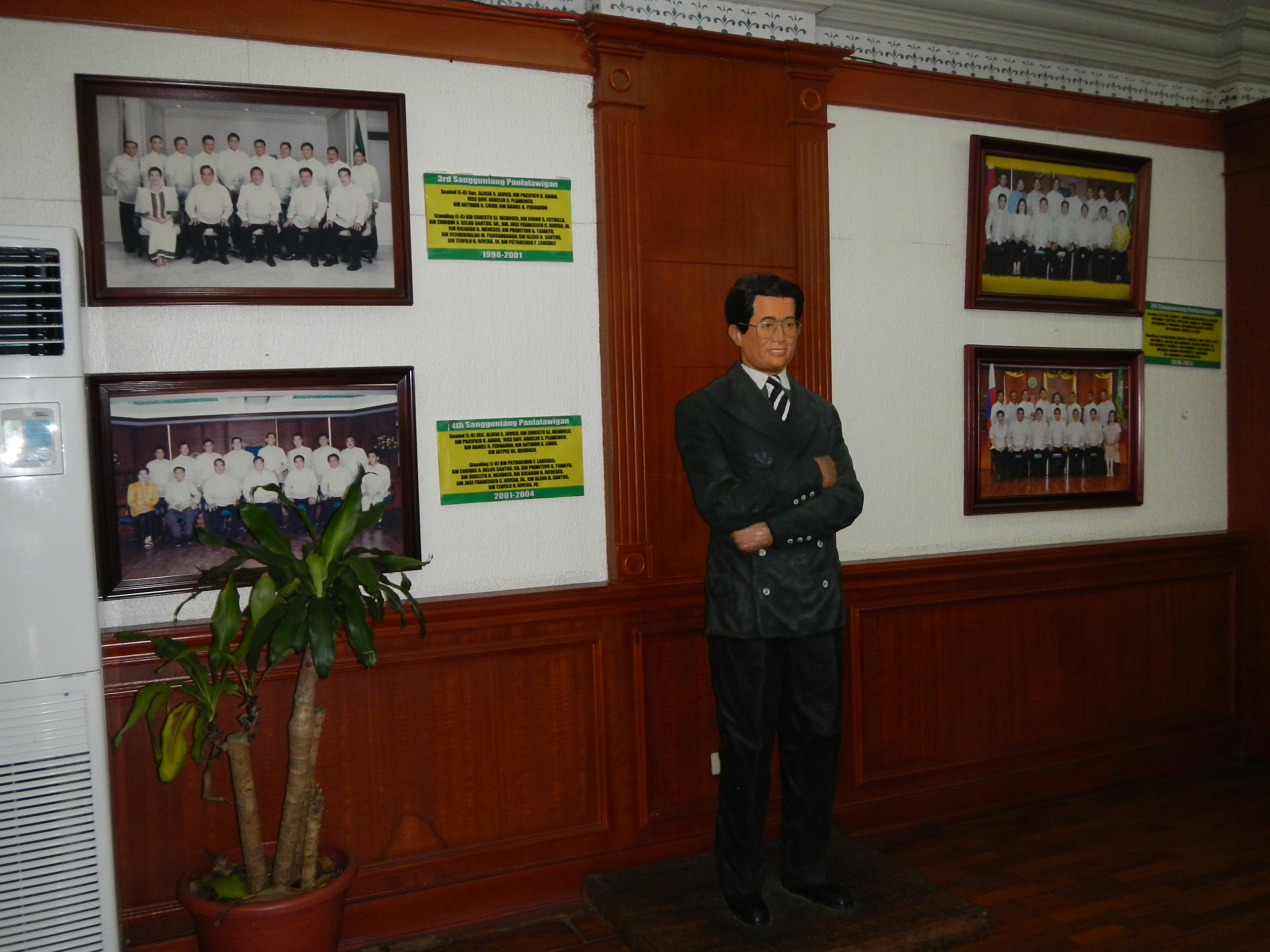
Ninoy Aquino-BPB Members photos

An additional three ex officio members are the presidents of the provincial chapters of the Association of Barangay Captains (ABC), the Philippine Councilors League (PCL), the Sangguniang Kabataan (SK) provincial president shall elect amongst themselves their provincial presidents which shall be their representatives at the board.

Starting in 2017, the province also reserved a seat for its indigenous peoples.

=== Current members ===
- Vice Governor: Alexis Castro (NUP)

Seat	Board member	Party	Term number	Start of term	End of term
Bulacan's 1st district	Michael Aquino	NUP	1	June 30, 2025	June 30, 2028
Bulacan's 1st district	Romina Fermin	Independent	3	June 30, 2019	June 30, 2028
Bulacan's 2nd district	Erlene Luz dela Cruz	NUP	3	June 30, 2019	June 30, 2028
Bulacan's 2nd district	Lee Edward Nicolas	NUP	2	June 30, 2022	June 30, 2028
Bulacan's 3rd district	Romeo Castro Jr.	NUP	3	June 30, 2019	June 30, 2028
Bulacan's 3rd district	Raul Mariano	NUP	2	June 30, 2022	June 30, 2028
Bulacan's 4th district	Anna Kathrina Hernandez	PFP	1	June 30, 2025	June 30, 2028
Bulacan's 4th district	William Villarica	PFP	1	June 30, 2025	June 30, 2028
Bulacan's 5th district	Richard Roque	NUP	2	June 30, 2022	June 30, 2028
Bulacan's 5th district	Cezar Mendoza	NUP	2	June 30, 2022	June 30, 2028
Bulacan's 6th district	Renato de Guzman Jr.	Lakas	2	June 30, 2022	June 30, 2028
Bulacan's 6th district	Arthur Legaspi	Lakas	2	June 30, 2022	June 30, 2028
San Jose del Monte's at-large district	Enrique delos Santos Jr.	NUP	3	June 30, 2019	June 30, 2028
San Jose del Monte's at-large district	Efren Bartolome Jr.	AR	1	June 30, 2025	June 30, 2028
ABC	Fortunato Angeles	Nonpartisan	1	October 3, 2024	January 1, 2026
PCL	Josef Andrew Mendoza	NPC	1	July 29, 2025	June 30, 2028
SK	Casey Tyrone Howard	Nonpartisan	1	November 28, 2023	January 1, 2026
IPMR	Liberato Sembrano	Nonpartisan	2	February 5, 2021	February 5, 2027

=== Membership summary ===
Election year	#	VG	ABC	IP MR	PCL	SK	1	2	3	4	5	6	7	8	9	10	11	12	13	14	Controlling party
2004 local	5th			—	?												—	—	—	—	Lakas
2007 local	6th			—	?												—	—	—	—	No majority
2010 local	7th			—													—	—	—	—	Liberal
2013 local	8th			—		—^{1}											—	—	—	—	NUP
2016 local	9th			—		—^{1}											—	—	—	—	Liberal
2017 IPMR	9th					—^{1}											—	—	—	—	Liberal
2018 BSKE	9th																—	—	—	—	Liberal
2019 local	10th																—	—	—	—	NUP
2021 IPMR	10th																—	—	—	—	NUP
2022 local	11th																		—	—	No majority
2023 BSKE	11th																		—	—	No majority
2024 IPMR	11th																		—	—	No majority
2025 local	12th																				NUP

^1 The term of elected officials of the Sangguniang Kabataan elected in 2010 expired on November 30, 2013, and were not replaced.

=== Vice Governor ===
Election year	Name	Party
1988	Ricardo Nicolas, Jr (until 1989)	
1988	Ramon Villarama (since 1989)	
1992	Josefina dela Cruz	
1995	Josefina dela Cruz	
1998	Aurelio Plamenco	Lakas
2001	Aurelio Plamenco	Lakas
2004	Aurelio Plamenco	Lakas
2007	Wilhelmino Sy-Alvarado	Lakas
2010	Daniel Fernando	Lakas–Kampi
2013	Daniel Fernando	NUP
2016	Daniel Fernando	Liberal
2019	Wilhelmino Sy-Alvarado	NUP
2022	Alex Castro	NUP
2025	Alex Castro	NUP

=== 1st District ===
- City: Malolos
- Municipalities: Bulakan, Calumpit, Hagonoy, Paombong, Pulilan
- Population (2020): 758,872

Election year	Member (party)	Member (party)	Member (party)
2004	Pacifico Aniag (Lakas)	Patrocinio Laderas (Lakas)	Raul Mendoza (Lakas)
2007	Christian Natividad (KAMPI)	Vicente Cruz, Sr. (Lakas)	Patrocinio Laderas (KAMPI)
2010	Michael Fermin (Liberal)	Felix Ople (Liberal)	Therese Cheryll Ople (Lakas-Kampi)
2013	Michael Fermin (NUP)	Felix Ople (NUP)	Therese Cheryll Ople (NUP)
2016	Felix Ople (Liberal)	Therese Cheryll Ople (Liberal)	Allan Andan (NPC)
2019	Allan Andan (PDP–Laban)	Romina Fermin (NUP)	Bernando Ople Jr. (NUP)
2022	Allan Andan (PDP–Laban)	Romina Fermin (PDP-Laban)	Seat eliminated
2025	Michael Aquino (NUP)	Romina Fermin (Independent)	Seat eliminated

=== 2nd District ===
- City: Baliwag
- Municipalities: Bustos, Plaridel
- Population (2020): 360,101

Election year	Member (party)	Member (party)
2004	Daniel Fernando (Lakas)	Ariel Arceo (Lakas)
2007	Ramon Posadas (KAMPI)	Ariel Arceo (UNO)
2010	Ramon Posadas (Liberal)	Enrique dela Cruz, Jr. (Liberal)
2013	Ramon Posadas (NUP)	Enrique dela Cruz, Jr. (NUP)
2016	Enrique dela Cruz, Jr. (Liberal)	Ma. Lourdes Posadas (Liberal)
2019	Erlene Luz dela Cruz (NUP)	Ramon Posadas (NUP)
2022	Erlene Luz dela Cruz (NUP)	Lee Edward Nicolas (PDP-Laban)
2025	Erlene Luz dela Cruz (NUP)	Lee Edward Nicolas (NUP)

=== 3rd District ===
- Municipalities: Doña Remedios Trinidad, San Ildefonso, San Miguel, San Rafael
- Population (2020): 419,539

Election year	Member (party)	Member (party)
2004	Enrique Viudez II (Lakas)	Ernesto Sulit (Lakas)
2007	Enrique Viudez II (KAMPI)	Ernesto Sulit (Lakas)
2010	Enrique Viudez II (Liberal)	Rino Castro (Liberal)
2013	Rino Castro (NUP)	Ernesto Sulit (Liberal)
2016	Rino Castro (NPC)	Emelita Viceo (Liberal)
2019	Romeo Castro, Jr. (NUP)	Emelita Viceo (NUP)
2022	Romeo Castro, Jr. (NUP)	Raul Mariano (NUP)
2025	Romeo Castro, Jr. (NUP)	Raul Mariano (NUP)

=== 4th District ===
- Cities: Meycauayan
- Municipalities: Marilao, Obando
- Population (2020): 1,191,917

Election year	Member (party)	Member (party)	Member (party)
2004	Enrique delos Santos (Lakas)	Glenn Santos (Lakas)	Primitivo Tamayo (Lakas)
2007	Eulogio Sarmiento III (Lakas)	Enrique delos Santos, Jr. (KAMPI)	Glenn Santos (KAMPI)
2010	Eulogio Sarmiento III (Liberal)	Enrique delos Santos, Jr. (Liberal)	Romeo Allan Robes (Lakas-Kampi)
2013	Eulogio Sarmiento III (NUP)	Enrique delos Santos, Jr. (NUP)	Allan Ray Baluyut (Nacionalista)
2016	Alexis Castro (NPC)	Allan Ray Baluyut (Liberal)	Perlita delos Santos (Liberal)
2019	Enrique delos Santos, Jr. (PDP–Laban)	Alexis Castro (NUP)	Allan Ray Baluyut (NUP)
2022	Enrique delos Santos, Jr. (PDP–Laban)	Allen Dale Baluyut (NUP)	Seat eliminated
2025	Anna Kathrina Hernandez (PFP)	William Villarica (PFP)	Seat eliminated

=== 5th District ===
- Municipalities: Balagtas, Bocaue, Guiguinto, Pandi
- Population (2020): 486,960

Election year	Member (party)	Member (party)
2022	Richard Roque (NUP)	Cezar Mendoza (NUP)
2025	Richard Roque (NUP)	Cezar Mendoza (NUP)

=== 6th District ===
- Municipalities: Angat, Norzagaray, Santa Maria
- Population (2020): 491,501

Election year	Member (party)	Member (party)
2022	Renato de Guzman, Jr. (PDP–Laban)	Arthur Legaspi (PDP-Laban)
2025	Renato de Guzman, Jr. (Lakas-CMD)	Arthur Legaspi (Lakas-CMD)

=== San Jose del Monte's at-large district ===
- City: San Jose del Monte
- Population (2020): 651,813

Election year	Member (party)	Member (party)
2025	Enrique delos Santos, Jr. (NUP)	Efren Bartolome, Jr. (AR)

=== Liga ng mga Barangay seat ===
Election year	Member
2007	Ferdinand Estrella
2010	Mark Cholo Violago
2013	Mark Cholo Violago
2018	Ramilito Capistrano (2018–2024) (Note: Died in office, October 3, 2024.)
2023	Ramilito Capistrano (2018–2024)
2023	Fortunato Angeles

=== Sangguniang Kabataan seat ===
Election year	Member
2007	Mark Joseph Guillermo
2010	Mark Jerome Anthony Santiago
2013	none
2018	John Myron Nicolas
2023	Casey Tyrone Howard

=== Philippine Councilors League seat ===
Election year	Member (party)
2007	Michael Fermin
2010	Ariel Arceo (PMP)
2013	Ariel Arceo (CDP)
2016	Josef Andrew Mendoza (Independent)
2019	Marie Claudette Serrano (interim) (NUP)
2019	William Villarica (PDP–Laban)
2022	William Villarica (PDP–Laban)
2025	Josef Andrew Mendoza (NPC)

=== Indigenous peoples' seat ===
Year	Member
2017	Norma Roque
2021	Liberato Sembrano
2024	Liberato Sembrano
