= The Heart Never Lies (album) =

Studio album by Michael Martin Murphey
- Released: August 19, 1983
- Genre: Country
- Length: 38:09
- Label: Liberty
- Producer: Jim Ed Norman

Michael Martin Murphey chronology
Michael Martin Murphey (1982)	The Heart Never Lies (1983)	The Best of Michael Martin Murphey (1984)

Singles from The Heart Never Lies
- 1. "Don't Count the Rainy Days" Released: August 19, 1983; 2. "Will It Be Love by Morning" Released: January 6, 1984; 3. "Disenchanted" Released: April 30, 1984; 4. "Radio Land" Released: August 25, 1984

Professional ratings
Review scores
Source	Rating
Allmusic	2/5 stars

The Heart Never Lies is the eleventh studio album by American singer-songwriter Michael Martin Murphey. The album peaked at number 27 on the Billboard Top Country Albums chart.

== Track listing ==
Tracklist are adapted from Discogs.

No.	Title	Writer(s)	Length
1.	"Will It Be Love by Morning"	Lewis Anderson; Fred Koller	2:23
2.	"Don't Count the Rainy Days"	Jerry Careaga; Wayland Holyfield	3:30
3.	"Disenchanted"	Chick Rains; Jim Ed Norman; Michael Martin Murphey	4:33
4.	"Goodbye Money Mountain"	Murphey	3:39
5.	"Radio Land"	Rains; Norman; Murphey	5:28
6.	"Maybe This Time"	Dave Loggins; Randy Goodrum	3:15
7.	"Showdown"	Murphey; C. Johnson	3:25
8.	"Sacred Heart"	Murphey	5:11
9.	"Crazy Blue"	Rains; Norman; Murphey	3:17
10.	"The Heart Never Lies"	Murphey	3:28
Total length:			38:09

== Credits ==
- Guitar: John Leslie Hug, Josh Leo, Randy Mitchell, Michael Martin Murphey, Rafe Van Hoy, Paul Worley
- Steel guitar: Carmen Acciaioli
- Bass: Michael Bowden, Joe Osborn
- Keyboards: Dennis Burnside, Mitch Humphries, Michael Martin Murphey, Brian Whitcomb
- Drums: Eddie Bayers, Matt Betton, Michael Huey
- Percussion: Victor Feldman
- Saxophone: Bryan Cummings
- Harmonica: Michael Martin Murphey
- Strings: Byron Berline, Alan Broadbent, Nick DeCaro, Jim Ed Norman
- Backing Vocals: Linda Dillard, Don Gant, Herb Pedersen, Joey Scarbury, Dennis Wilson

== Chart performance ==
Chart (1983)	Peak position
U.S. Billboard Top Country Albums	27
U.S. Billboard 200	187
