= Michael Martin Murphey (album) =

Studio album by Michael Martin Murphey
- Released: 1982
- Genre: Country
- Length: 40:40
- Label: Liberty
- Producer: Jim Ed Norman

Michael Martin Murphey chronology
Hard Country (1981)	Michael Martin Murphey (1982)	The Heart Never Lies (1983)

Singles from Michael Martin Murphey
- 1. "What's Forever For" Released: June 14, 1982; 2. "Still Taking Chances" Released: November 8, 1982; 3. "Love Affairs" Released: March 21, 1983

Michael Martin Murphey is the tenth studio album by American singer-songwriter Michael Martin Murphey and his first for Liberty Records. The album peaked at number 14 on the Billboard Top Country Albums chart.

== Track listing ==
No.	Title	Writer(s)	Length
1.	"Still Taking Chances"	Michael Martin Murphey	4:10
2.	"Two Step Is Easy"	Murphey	3:20
3.	"What's Forever For"	Rafe Van Hoy	2:50
4.	"Take It Like a Man"	Murphey, Mike d'Abo	3:33
5.	"First Taste of Freedom"	Murphey, d'Abo	3:41
6.	"Love Affairs"	Murphey, d'Abo	4:12
7.	"Ring of Truth"	Murphey, d'Abo	4:16
8.	"Crystal"	Murphey	6:02
9.	"Lost River"	Murphey	4:17
10.	"Hearts in the Right Place"	Murphey, d'Abo	4:19

== Credits ==
Music

- Michael Martin Murphey – vocals, guitar, piano, harmonica
- John Leslie Hug – guitar
- Fred Tackett – guitar
- Michael Hearne – guitar
- James Burton – guitar
- Carmen Acciaioli – steel guitar
- Jay Dee Maness – steel guitar
- Lance Ong – synthesizer
- Brian Whitcomb – keyboards
- John Hickman – banjo
- Byron Berline – violin
- Leland Sklar – bass
- David McDaniels – bass
- Mike Botts – drums
- Buzzy Buchanan – drums
- Herb Pedersen – background vocals
- Chris Montan – background vocals
- Denny Brooks – background vocals
- Joey Scarbury – background vocals
- Harry Stinson – background vocals
- Jennifer Warnes – background vocals

Production

- Bill Burks – artwork
- Jonathan Louie – artwork (back cover)
- Glenn Grab – contractor (strings)
- Eric Prestidge – engineer, mixing
- Ken Perry – mastering
- Richard McKernan – mixing
- Mary Maciukas – photography
- Jim Ed Norman – producer
- John Rosenthal – recording
- Russ Castillo – recording

== Chart performance ==
Chart (1982)	Peak position
U.S. Billboard Top Country Albums	14
U.S. Billboard 200	69
