= What She Wants =

Single by Michael Martin Murphey

from the album The Best of Michael Martin Murphey
- B-side: "Still Taking Chances"
- Released: November 19, 1984
- Genre: Country
- Length: 3:30
- Label: Liberty
- Songwriter(s): Renee Armand, Kerry Chater
- Producer(s): Jim Ed Norman

Michael Martin Murphey singles chronology
"Radio Land" (1984)	"What She Wants" (1984)	"Carolina in the Pines" (1985)

"What She Wants" is a song written by Renee Armand and Kerry Chater and recorded by American country music artist Michael Martin Murphey. It was released in November 1984 as the lead single from his compilation album The Best of Michael Martin Murphey. The song peaked at number 8 on the U.S. Billboard Hot Country Singles & Tracks chart and at number 6 on the Canadian RPM Country Tracks chart.

== Music video ==
A music video was released to promote the song and it stars Murphey and his wife Mary. The video, directed by David Hogan, is designed to call attention to the growing plight of runaway children.

== Chart performance ==
Chart (1984–1985)	Peak position
US Hot Country Songs (Billboard)	8
Canadian RPM Country Tracks	6
