= What's Forever For =

1979 song written by Rafe Van Hoy

Song by England Dan & John Ford Coley

from the album Dr. Heckle and Mr. Jive
- Released: March 1979
- Recorded: October 1978
- Genre: Soft rock
- Length: 3:25
- Label: Big Tree
- Songwriter: Rafe Van Hoy
- Producer: Kyle Lehning

"What's Forever For"

Single by Michael Martin Murphey

from the album Michael Martin Murphey
- B-side: "Crystal"
- Released: June 14, 1982
- Recorded: August 31, 1981
- Genre: Country; soft rock
- Length: 2:50
- Label: Liberty (1466)
- Songwriter: Rafe Van Hoy
- Producer: Jim Ed Norman

Michael Martin Murphey singles chronology
"The Two-Step Is Easy" (1982)	"What's Forever For" (1982)	"Still Taking Chances" (1983)

"What's Forever For" is a song written by Rafe Van Hoy and first recorded by England Dan & John Ford Coley on their 1979 album Dr. Heckle and Mr. Jive.

The song saw its biggest success when it was recorded by American country music artist Michael Martin Murphey. It was released in June 1982 as the second single from his album, Michael Martin Murphey. The song was Murphey's first of two number ones on the country chart. The single went to number one for one week and spent 16 weeks in the country top 40. On the Hot 100, "What's Forever For" was his final top 40 hit, peaking at number 19. The song is also one of his most well known in the Philippines, along with "Maybe This Time".

== Charts ==
=== Weekly charts ===
Chart (1982)	Peak position
US Billboard Hot 100	19
US Adult Contemporary (Billboard)	4
US Hot Country Songs (Billboard)	1
Canadian Country Tracks (RPM)	1
Canadian Adult Contemporary Tracks (RPM)	7

=== Year-end charts ===
Chart (1982)	Position
US Billboard Hot 100	93
US Adult Contemporary (Billboard)	42
US Hot Country Songs (Billboard)	3

== Cover versions ==
- Anne Murray on her 1980 album Somebody's Waiting, released by Capitol Records. "What's Forever For" was also included as the B-side of her Beatles cover hit, "I'm Happy Just to Dance with You".
- T. G. Sheppard on his 1981 album I Love 'Em All, released by Warner Bros. Records.
- Daryl Somers on his 1982 single.
- Johnny Mathis on his 1982 album Friends in Love, released on Columbia Records.
- Jeff Trachta and Bobbie Eakes, on the soap opera The Bold and the Beautiful and on their 1994 album Bold and Beautiful Duets.
- Billy Gilman on his 2000 album One Voice, released by Epic Records.
- Filipino acoustic singer Nyoy Volante covered the song on his 2008 album, Heartstrings.
- Tonny Willé and Marco Bakker
- John Conlee on the album With Love in 1981 on MCA.
- B.J. Thomas on his 2000 album You Call That a Mountain.
- Olivia Newton-John on her 1998 album Back With a Heart, Japanese release.
