= Don't Count the Rainy Days =

Single by Michael Martin Murphey

from the album The Heart Never Lies
- B-side: "The Heart Never Lies"
- Released: August 19, 1983
- Genre: Country
- Length: 3:30
- Label: Liberty
- Songwriter(s): Jerry Careaga, Wayland Holyfield
- Producer(s): Jim Ed Norman

Michael Martin Murphey singles chronology
"Love Affairs" (1983)	"Don't Count the Rainy Days" (1983)	"Will It Be Love by Morning" (1983)

"Don't Count the Rainy Days" is a song written by Jerry Careaga and Wayland Holyfield, and recorded by American country music artist Michael Martin Murphey. It was released in August 1983 as the lead single from the album The Heart Never Lies. The song peaked at number 9 on the U.S. Billboard Hot Country Singles in early 1983 and at number 6 on the U.S. Billboard Bubbling Under Hot 100.

== Cover versions ==
John Conlee recorded the song for his 1983 album In My Eyes.

== Chart performance ==
Chart (1983)	Peak position
US Hot Country Songs (Billboard)	9
US Adult Contemporary (Billboard)	16
US Bubbling Under Hot 100 Singles (Billboard)	6
Canadian RPM Country Tracks	22
