= Will It Be Love by Morning =

Single by Michael Martin Murphey

from the album The Heart Never Lies
- B-side: "Goodbye Money Mountain"
- Released: January 6, 1984
- Genre: Country
- Length: 2:27
- Label: Liberty
- Songwriter(s): Lewis Anderson, Fred Koller
- Producer(s): Jim Ed Norman

Michael Martin Murphey singles chronology
"Don't Count the Rainy Days" (1983)	"Will It Be Love by Morning" (1984)	"Disenchanted" (1984)

"Will It Be Love by Morning" is a song written by Lewis Anderson and Fred Koller, and recorded by American country music artist Michael Martin Murphey. It was released in January 1984 as the second single from the album The Heart Never Lies. The song peaked at number 7 on the U.S. Billboard Hot Country Singles and at number 5 on the Canadian RPM Country Tracks chart.

== Chart performance ==
Chart (1984)	Peak position
US Hot Country Songs (Billboard)	7
Canadian RPM Country Tracks	5
