= 2022 Bulacan local elections =

Elections in Bulacan

2022 Bulacan gubernatorial election
- May 9, 2022
- Registered: 2,007,523
- Turnout: 87.58%
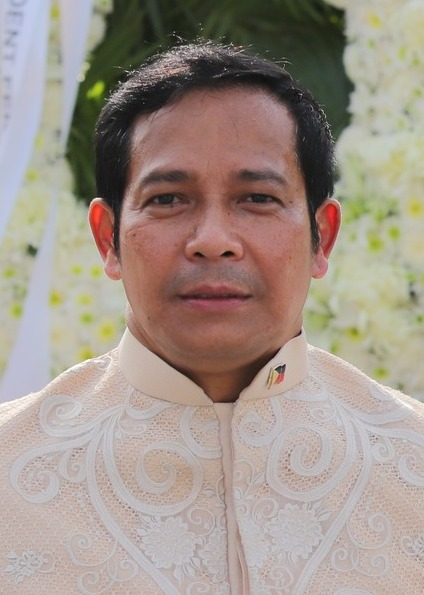

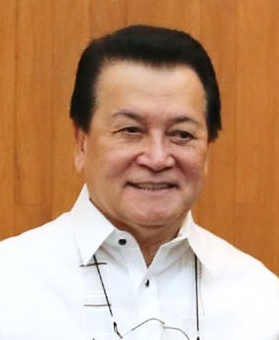
Nominee	Daniel Fernando	Wilhelmino Sy-Alvarado
Party	NUP	PDP–Laban
Alliance	TroPa	UniTeam
Running mate	Alex Castro	Jonjon Mendoza
Popular vote	987,160	586,650
Percentage	61%	36.25%
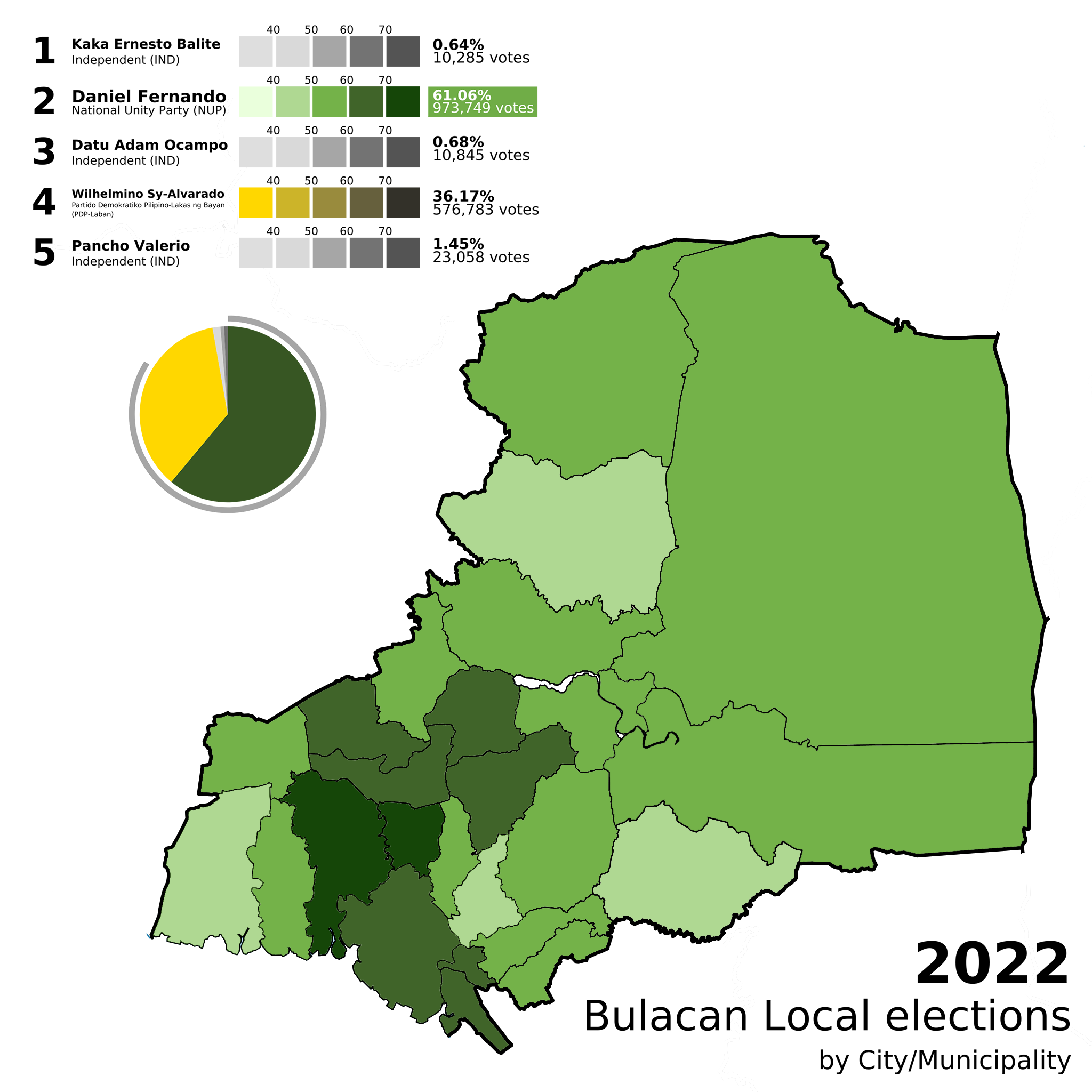
- Shaded breakdown of the city/municipality results. Darker shaded cities/municipalities indicate a larger margin-of-victory of the winning candidate.
Governor before election
Daniel Fernando
NUP
Elected Governor
Daniel Fernando
NUP
- 2022 Bulacan vice gubernatorial election
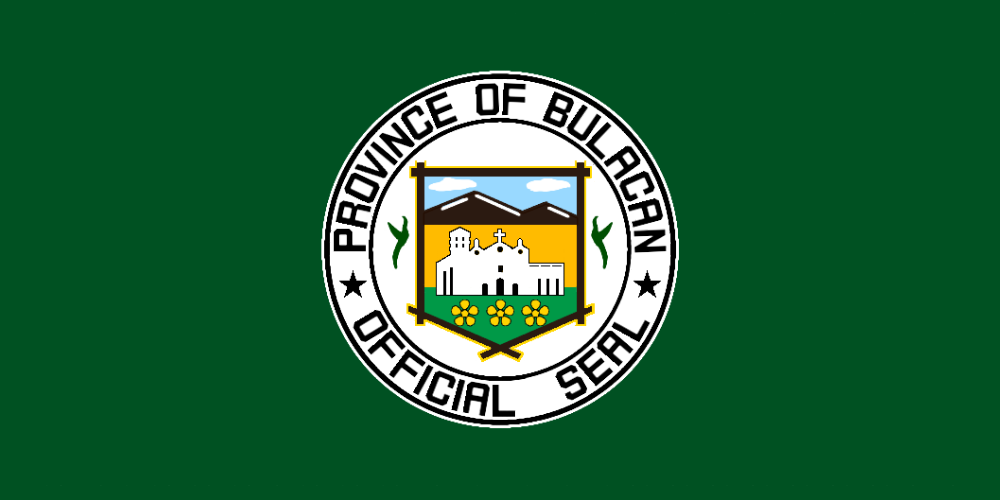
- May 9, 2022
- Registered: 2,007,523
- Turnout: 77.84%
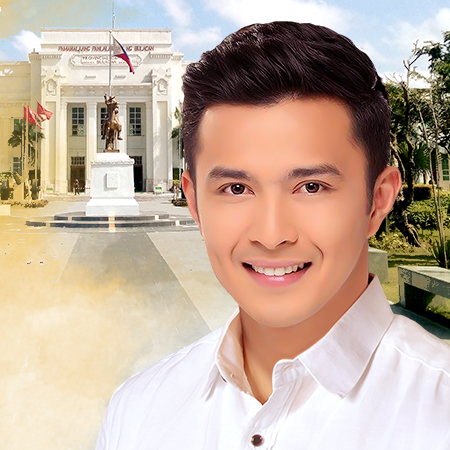

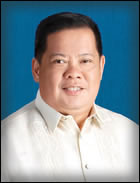
Nominee	Alex Castro	Jonjon Mendoza
Party	NUP	PDP–Laban
Popular vote	755,785	626,656
Percentage	48.37%	40.1%
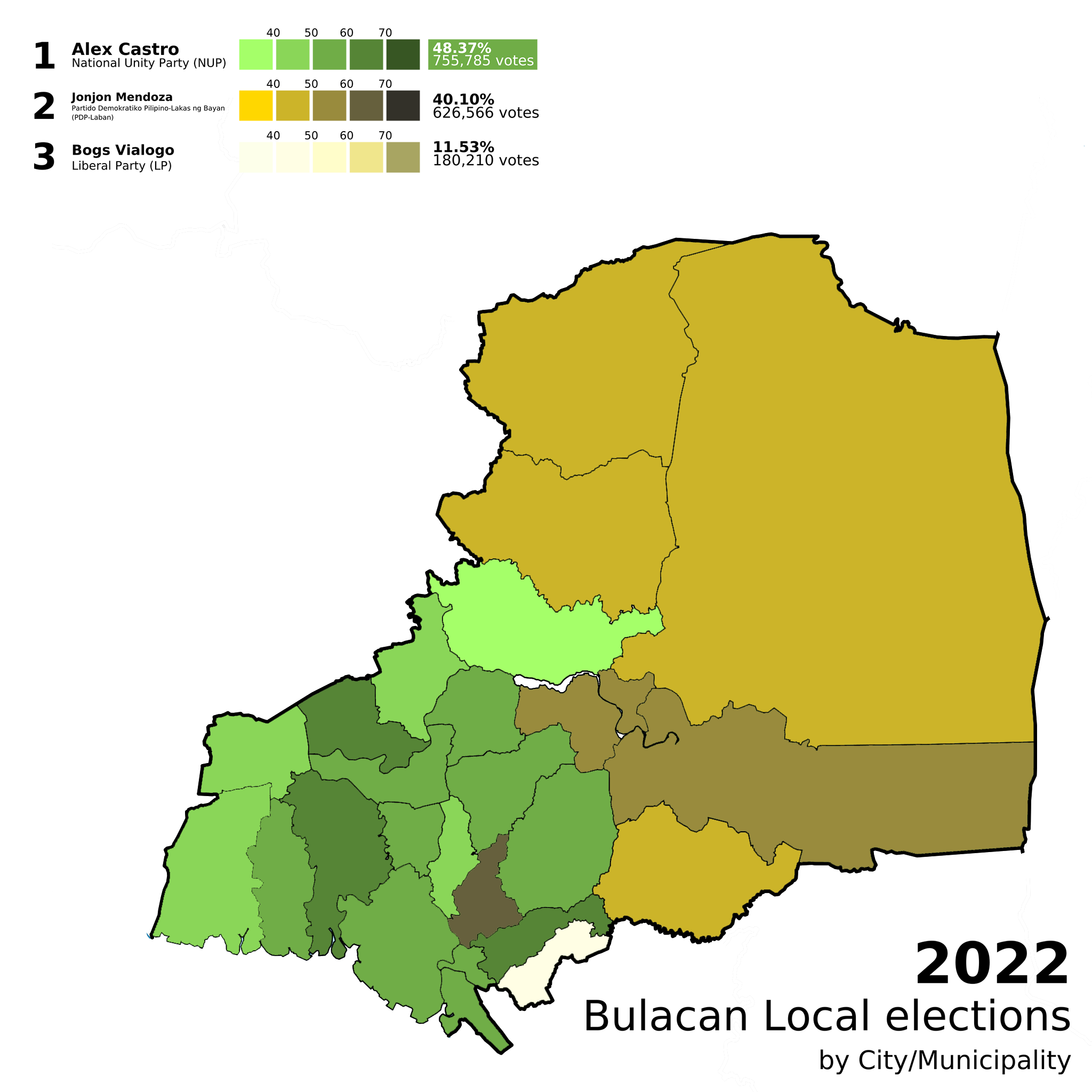
- Shaded breakdown of the city/municipality results. Darker shaded cities/municipalities indicate a larger margin-of-victory of the winning candidate.
Vice Governor of Bulacan before election
Wilhelmino Sy-Alvarado
PDP–Laban
Elected Vice Governor of Bulacan
Alex Castro
NUP

Local elections were held in the province of Bulacan on May 9, 2022 as part of the 2022 Philippine general election. Bulacan is one of the eight-one provinces of the Philippines participating in the election while conducting their own local elections from the provincial-level to the municipal-level of officials. Bulacan has six legislative districts that encompass most of its municipalities and cities, the lone exception of San Jose del Monte which is its own legislative lone district.

Incumbent governor Daniel Fernando ran for a second-term in office as governor of the province. Incumbent vice governor Wilhelmino Sy-Alvarado, who previously served as Governor from 2010 to 2019, declared his candidacy for Governor to contest the seat for a non-consecutive term. Fernando was part of the Leni-Kiko slate of candidates while Alvarado was part of the UniTeam alliance of presidential-candidate Bongbong Marcos. On election night, Fernando was elected to a second-term as governor of Bulacan, defeating Alvarado after receiving 987,160 votes to Alvarado's 586,650. Moreover, Fernando's running mate, 1st District Board Member Alex Castro won 755,785 votes to Alvarado's running mate, former rival-tuned ally, former governor Jonjon Mendoza won 626,656 votes.

== Presidential election ==
Bulacan was the third-most populous province nationwide, boasting 3,708,890 people. This roughly translates to 2,007,523 registered voters or 54.13% of the population is eligible to vote in this election. Bulacan ranks fifth nationwide behind Laguna and Pangasinan while ahead of Negros Occidental and Batangas.

UniTeam and PFP presidential candidate Bongbong Marcos won Bulacan with 1,040,157 votes or 60.29% of the vote meanwhile, Liberal party presidential candidate Leni Robredo won 500,285 votes or 29%.

Several rallies from both camps were held in Bulacan during the course of the campaign. Robredo visited Bulacan twice while Marcos visited the province three times during the course of the campaign. An 84.67% turnout was projected in Bulacan for the presidential tally of votes while 83.39% turnout was projected for the vice-presidential tally.

Party	Candidate	Votes	%
PFP	Bongbong Marcos	1,040,157	60.29%
Independent	Leni Robredo	500,285	29%
Aksyon	Isko Moreno	92,610	5.37%
Reporma	Panfilo Lacson	44,934	2.6%
PROMDI	Manny Pacquiao	36,467	2.11%
PLM	Leody de Guzman	3,056	0.18%
Independent	Ernesto Abella	2,399	0.14%
PDSP	Norberto Gonzales	2,312	0.13%
KTPNAN	Faisal Mangondato	1,517	0.09%
DPP	Jose Montemayor Jr.	1,380	0.08%
Total Votes		1,725,117	98.12%
Invalid/Blank votes		18,655	1.06%
Valid Votes		1,758,220	
Registered Voters		2,007,523	

== Gubernatorial and Vice Gubernatorial election ==
The candidates for governor and vice governor with the highest number of votes wins the seat; they are voted separately, therefore, they may be of different parties when elected.

=== Governor ===
Incumbent Governor Daniel Fernando will run for his second term against his former political ally, incumbent Vice Governor Wilhelmino Sy-Alvarado.

Bulacan Gubernatorial Election
Party	Candidate	Votes	%
NUP	Daniel Fernando	987,160	60.99
PDP–Laban	Wilhelmino Sy-Alvarado	586,650	36.24
Independent	Pancho Valerio	23,228	1.43
Independent	Datu Adam Ocampo	10,958	0.67
Independent	Kaka Ernesto Balite	10,391	0.64
Total votes		1,618,387	100
NUP hold			

==== Per City/Municipality ====
City/Municipality	Daniel Fernando		Wilhelmino Sy-Alvarado		Pancho Valerio		Datu Adam Ocampo		Kaka Ernesto Balite	
City/Municipality	Votes	%	Votes	%	Votes	%	Votes	%	Votes	%
Angat	19,991	58.84	13,448	39.58	220	0.65	162	0.48	155	0.46
Balagtas	25,558	61.17	15,012	35.93	770	1.84	258	0.62	186	0.45
Baliuag	54,913	63.68	26,718	31.07	3,351	3.90	582	0.68	427	0.50
Bocaue	34,852	54.60	26,693	41.81	1,761	2.76	270	0.42	260	0.41
Bulakan	29,164	66.83	13,297	30.47	462	1.06	413	0.95	302	0.69
Bustos	26,398	66.90	11,571	29.33	1,123	2.85	189	0.48	176	0.45
Calumpit	32,487	57.02	23,346	40.98	469	0.82	352	0.62	316	0.55
Doña Remedios Trinidad	10,794	62.56	5,985	34.69	197	1.14	192	1.11	85	0.49
Guiguinto	44,309	70.07	17,092	27.03	1,217	1.92	331	0.52	287	0.45
Hagonoy	32,734	51.69	29,749	46.97	314	0.50	280	0.44	256	0.40
Malolos	75,016	71.83	26,741	25.61	1,326	1.27	966	0.92	387	0.37
Marilao	50,530	61.60	29,084	35.46	1,056	1.29	742	0.90	612	0.75
Meycauayan	57,372	56.80	40,069	39.67	1,591	1.58	1,141	1.13	833	0.82
Norzagaray	34,835	57.26	24,865	40.87	433	0.71	417	0.69	288	0.47
Obando	18,815	68.22	7,842	28.43	334	1.21	307	1.11	281	1.02
Pandi	49,754	68.75	20,531	28.37	1,127	1.56	563	0.78	397	0.55
Paombong	19,640	64.22	10,403	34.02	217	0.71	162	0.53	158	0.52
Plaridel	34,741	63.16	18,140	32.98	1,523	2.77	313	0.57	289	0.53
Pulilan	36,796	69.85	14,696	27.90	577	1.10	313	0.59	296	0.56
San Ildefonso	32,852	52.78	28,225	45.35	527	0.85	361	0.58	275	0.44
San Jose del Monte	113,428	54.16	90,297	43.11	2,156	1.03	1,858	0.89	1,702	0.81
San Miguel	34,003	58.49	23,224	39.95	391	0.67	290	0.50	224	0.39
San Rafael	31,955	62.29	18,212	35.50	665	1.30	250	0.49	220	0.43
Santa Maria	72,812	61.91	41,543	35.32	1,251	1.06	1,016	0.86	990	0.84
TOTAL	987,160	60.99	586,650	36.24	23,228	1.43	10,958	0.67	10,391	0.64

=== Vice Governor ===
With incumbent Vice Governor Wilhelmino Sy-Alvarado running for governor, his party has nominated former governor and 3rd District representative Joselito Mendoza for the post. He will be up against incumbent 4th District board member Alex Castro and former Meycauayan City vice mayor Salvador Violago.

Bulacan Vice gubernatorial election
Party	Candidate	Votes	%
NUP	Alex Castro	755,785	48.36
PDP–Laban	Jonjon Mendoza	626,656	40.10
Liberal	Salvador Violago	180,210	11.53
Total votes		1,562,651	100
NUP gain from PDP–Laban			

==== Per City/Municipality ====
City/Municipality	Alex Castro		Jonjon Mendoza		Salvador Violago	
City/Municipality	Votes	%	Votes	%	Votes	%
Angat	11,380	34.69	19,365	59.02	2,064	6.29
Balagtas	20,264	49.96	17,991	44.36	2,304	5.68
Baliuag	35,124	42.83	28,343	34.56	18,544	22.61
Bocaue	20,774	33.23	38,919	62.26	2,817	4.51
Bulakan	21,638	51.79	15,194	36.37	4,948	11.84
Bustos	19,696	52.14	14,128	37.40	3,952	10.46
Calumpit	25,927	47.44	24,837	45.44	3,891	7.12
Doña Remedios Trinidad	7,109	42.82	8,371	50.42	1,123	6.76
Guiguinto	33,703	55.31	23,925	39.26	3,308	5.43
Hagonoy	30,504	51.64	23,964	40.57	4,604	7.79
Malolos	61,474	60.51	33,123	32.60	6,992	6.88
Marilao	51,794	63.54	24,229	29.72	5,494	6.74
Meycauayan	34,263	33.75	24,742	24.37	42,527	41.89
Norzagaray	23,495	40.44	32,173	55.38	2,428	4.18
Obando	15,419	56.86	6,926	25.54	4,773	17.60
Pandi	41,227	59.30	24,800	35.67	3,494	5.03
Paombong	17,078	57.99	10,377	35.23	1,996	6.78
Plaridel	27,182	51.49	18,941	35.88	6,667	12.63
Pulilan	30,207	60.22	15,424	30.75	4,534	9.04
San Ildefonso	25,181	41.51	30,046	49.53	5,431	8.95
San Jose del Monte	85,361	42.55	96,149	47.93	19,111	9.53
San Miguel	23,056	41.46	26,701	48.01	5,853	10.53
San Rafael	20,704	41.43	17,065	34.15	12,203	24.42
Santa Maria	64,272	57.02	39,192	34.77	9,257	8.21
TOTAL	755,785	48.36	626,656	40.10	180,210	11.53

== Congressional elections ==
Each of Bulacan's six legislative districts and the lone district of San Jose del Monte will elect each representative to the House of Representatives. The candidate with the highest number of votes wins the seat.

=== 1st District ===
Incumbent Representative Jose Antonio Sy-Alvarado is running for his third and final term against former Malolos mayor Danilo Domingo.

2022 Philippine House of Representatives election in Bulacan's 1st District
Party	Candidate	Votes	%
NUP	Danny DAD Domingo	202,712	58.20
PDP–Laban	Kuya Jose Sy-Alvarado	140,798	40.42
Reform	Kuya Mac de Guzman	4,748	1.36
Total votes		348,258	100
NUP gain from PDP–Laban			

=== 2nd District ===
Incumbent Gavini "Apol" Pancho is term-limited, and his party nominated his sister, Tina for his seat.

2022 Philippine House of Representatives election in Bulacan's 2nd District
Party	Candidate	Votes	%
NUP	Ditse Tina Pancho	137,276	80.63
NPC	FB Bermudez	24,936	14.64
Independent	Jimmy Villafuerte	4,746	2.78
Independent	Tony Deborja	3,277	1.92
Total votes		170,235	100
NUP hold			

=== 3rd District ===
Incumbent Lorna Silverio will run for her third and final term.

2022 Philippine House of Representatives election in Bulacan's 3rd District
Party	Candidate	Votes	%
NUP	Lorna Silverio	143,698	69.07
Aksyon	Jessie Viceo	61,258	29.57
Independent	Allan Villena	2,811	1.35
Total votes		208,037	100
NUP hold			

=== 4th District ===
Incumbent Henry Villarica is running for Mayor of Meycauayan, switching places with his wife, incumbent Mayor Linabelle Ruth Villarica.

2022 Philippine House of Representatives election in Bulacan's 4th District
Party	Candidate	Votes	%
PDP–Laban	Linabelle Villarica	180,067	91.01
Aksyon	Raquel Guardiano	11,476	5.80
PRP	Ferdy Victolero	6,303	3.18
Total votes		197,846	100
PDP–Laban hold			

=== 5th District ===
This is the first time the district will be holding an election since the redistricting happened, with incumbent Guiguinto mayor Ambrosio "Boy" Cruz running for the seat against Atty. Arnel Alcaraz.

2022 Philippine House of Representatives election in Bulacan's 5th District
Party	Candidate	Votes	%
PDP–Laban	Ambrosio Cruz Jr.	128,065	53.14
NUP	AAA Alcaraz	112,899	46.85
Total votes		240,964	100
PDP–Laban win (new seat)			

=== 6th District ===
This is the first time the district will be holding an election since the redistricting happened, with incumbent Norzagaray mayor Fred Germar running for the seat against former DPWH undersecretary Salvador Pleyto, former La Salle Lady Spiker Kaye Martinez Daly, and three other candidates.

2022 Philippine House of Representatives election in Bulacan's 6th District
Party	Candidate	Votes	%
PDP–Laban	Ador Pleyto	81,307	37.67
NUP	Fred Germar	76,430	35.41
Liberal	Kaye Martinez Daly	51,491	23.86
Aksyon	Ramon Carlos Villarama	5,141	2.38
Independent	Jose Mangulabanan	828	0.38
Independent	Ernesto Padernos	595	0.27
Total votes		215,972	100
PDP–Laban win (new seat)			

=== San Jose del Monte ===
Incumbent Florida Robes is running for her third and final term against former Mayor Reynaldo San Pedro.

2022 Philippine House of Representatives election in San Jose del Monte's Lone District
Party	Candidate	Votes	%
PDP–Laban	Florida Robes	136,680	64.20
PPM	Reynaldo San Pedro	76,192	35.79
Total votes		212,872	100
PDP–Laban hold			

== Sangguniang Panlalawigan elections ==
All 6 Districts of Bulacan will elect members of the Bulacan Provincial Board. All districts send two board members each. Election is via plurality-at-large voting; a voter can vote up to the maximum number of board members his district is sending.

With the redistricting that happened, the 1st and 4th districts will no longer be able to send three members to the board, and instead two members will be sent to the board.

Party	Votes	%	Seats
National Unity Party	1,009,844	40.88	6
PDP-Laban	969,541	39.25	6
Lakas–CMD	165,714	6.71	–
Progressive Movement for the Devolution of Initiatives	69,583	2.82	–
Liberal Party	58,040	2.35	–
Partido Federal ng Pilipinas	28,232	1.14	–
Aksyon Demokratiko	24,488	0.99	–
People's Reform Party	8,041	0.33	–
Kilusang Bagong Lipunan	6,691	0.27	–
Independent	130,043	5.26	–
Ex officio seats			3
Reserved seats			1
Total	2,470,217	100.00	16

=== 1st District ===
Incumbent Board Member Allan Andan will be running for his third and final term, while incumbent board members Mina Fermin and Jong Ople will be running for their second terms.

2022 Provincial Board Election in 1st District of Bulacan
Party	Candidate	Votes	%
PDP–Laban	Allan Andan	158,344	28.50
PDP–Laban	Mina Fermin	145,287	26.15
NUP	Toti Ople	99,812	17.97
NUP	Jong Ople	98,613	17.75
PROMDI	Long Repapit Mejia	38,048	6.85
Independent	Aldwin Angelo Rodriguez	8,073	1.45
Independent	Arnold Mercado	7,212	1.29
Total votes		555,379	100

=== 2nd District ===
Incumbent Board Members Pechay dela Cruz and Atty. Monet Posadas will be running for their second terms.

2022 Provincial Board Election in 2nd District of Bulacan
Party	Candidate	Votes	%
NUP	Pechay dela Cruz	78,730	28.56
PDP–Laban	Dingdong Nicolas	60,508	21.95
Independent	Ate Charm Clemente	57,145	20.73
NUP	Bokal Atty. Monet Posadas	55,214	20.03
PDP–Laban	Grace Alcantara	24,038	8.72
Total votes		275,635	100

=== 3rd District ===
Incumbent Board Member Emily Viceo is running for her third and final term; incumbent Board Member RC Nono Castro is running for his second term.

2022 Provincial Board Election in 3rd District of Bulacan
Party	Candidate	Votes	%
NUP	RC Nono Castro	89,893	30.87
NUP	Aye Mariano	88,403	30.36
Lakas	Emily Viceo	73,288	25.17
PDP–Laban	Luis Sarrondo	39,561	13.58
Total votes		291,145	100

=== 4th District ===
Incumbent Board Member Allan Ray Baluyut is term-limited; his son, Allen will be running for his seat. Board Member Alex Castro did not run for his third and final term, and instead ran for Vice Governor, while Board Member Jon-jon delos Santos will be running for his second term.

2022 Provincial Board Election in 4th District of Bulacan
Party	Candidate	Votes	%
PDP–Laban	Jon-jon delos Santos	241,059	38.21
NUP	Allen Baluyut	173,242	27.46
Lakas	Paul Pillas	92,426	14.65
Independent	Estelito Alcaraz	44,502	7.05
PFP	Marni delos Santos	28,232	4.47
Liberal	Edgar Mejia	21,655	3.43
PROMDI	Jorick Atienza	21,564	3.41
PRP	Danny Clores	8,041	1.27
Total votes		630,721	100

=== 5th District ===
This is the first time the district will be holding an election since the redistricting happened.

2022 Provincial Board Election in 5th District of Bulacan
Party	Candidate	Votes	%
NUP	Ricky Roque	100,397	27.14
NUP	Teta Mendoza	86,264	23.32
PDP–Laban	Anjo Mendoza	84,647	22.88
PDP–Laban	Lorna Libiran	55,694	15.05
Aksyon	Doc Nick Sanchez	24,488	6.62
Independent	Ate Let Cruz	11,719	3.16
KBL	Dan Alvaro Galura	6,691	1.80
Total votes		369,900	100

=== 6th District ===
This is the first time the district will be holding an election since the redistricting happened.

2022 Provincial Board Election in 6th District of Bulacan
Party	Candidate	Votes	%
PDP–Laban	Jay de Guzman	87,367	25.14
PDP–Laban	Art Legaspi	73,036	21.02
NUP	Rico Sto. Domingo	70,520	20.29
NUP	Junjun Saplala	68,756	19.79
Liberal	Boyet dela Cruz	36,385	10.47
PROMDI	Jelo Lopez	9,971	2.86
Independent	Joseph Tica	1,392	0.40
Total votes		347,247	100

== City and Municipal elections ==
The candidates for mayor and vice mayor with the highest number of votes wins the seat; they are voted separately, therefore, they may be of different parties when elected.

=== 1st District ===
- City: Malolos
- Municipalities: Bulakan, Calumpit, Hagonoy, Paombong, Pulilan

==== Malolos ====
Incumbent City Mayor Bebong Gatchalian is running for reelection against former City Mayor Christian Natividad.

Malolos mayoral election
Party	Candidate	Votes	%
PDP–Laban	Christian Natividad	59,557	54.72
NUP	Bebong Gatchalian	49,270	45.27
Total votes		108,827	100
PDP–Laban gain from NUP			

Incumbent City Vice Mayor Len Pineda will be running for his second term.

Malolos City vice mayoral election
Party	Candidate	Votes	%
Aksyon	Migs Tengco Bautista	44,452	41.74
PDP–Laban	Len Pineda	26,578	24.96
NUP	Erick DpatBayan Fernandez	25,919	24.34
Independent	ABC Diony Mendoza	9,533	8.95
Total votes		106,842	100
Aksyon gain from PDP–Laban			

==== Bulakan ====
Incumbent Mayor Vergel Meneses is running for reelection against Vice Mayor Patrick Neil Meneses.

Bulakan mayoral election
Party	Candidate	Votes	%
PDP–Laban	Vergel Meneses	24,195	51.63
NUP	Patrick Neil Meneses	12,611	26.91
Aksyon	Kap Michael Ramos	7,235	15.43
Independent	Atty. Ryan Trinidad	2,818	6.01
Total votes		46,859	100
PDP–Laban hold			

As incumbent Vice Mayor Patrick Meneses will be running for Mayor, incumbent Councilors Aika Sanchez, Oya Mendoza, and Berting Bituin will battle for the vice-mayoralty race.

Bulakan vice mayoral election
Party	Candidate	Votes	%
PDP–Laban	Aika Sanchez	16,194	35.70
NUP	Oya Mendoza	12,334	27.19
Independent	Kap. Osang Lava-Gamboa	10,033	22.12
Aksyon	Berting Bituin	6,795	14.98
Total votes		45,356	100
PDP–Laban gain from NUP			

==== Calumpit ====
Incumbent Mayor Jessie de Jesus is term-limited, his brother, Municipal Administrator James, will run in his place. James will be up against incumbent Vice Mayor Aboy de Belen and incumbent Councilor Lorna dela Cruz.

Calumpit mayoral election
Party	Candidate	Votes	%
NUP	Lem Faustino	28,993	47.62
PDP–Laban	M1 James de Jesus	27,664	45.44
Aksyon	Aboy de Belen	3,425	5.62
PROMDI	Pastora Lorna dela Cruz	793	1.30
Total votes		60,875	100
NUP gain from PDP–Laban			

Incumbent Vice Mayor Aboy de Belen will be running for Mayor; among the vice mayoralty candidates are former Vice Mayor Zar Candelaria and incumbent Councilors Boy Lim Rañola and Jon-jon Mendoza.

Calumpit vice mayoral election
Party	Candidate	Votes	%
NUP	Doc Zar Candelaria	33,070	57.98
PDP–Laban	Jon-jon Mendoza	18,095	31.72
PROMDI	Boy Lim Rañola	5,599	9.81
PM	Bing Santiago	265	0.46
Total votes		57,029	100
NUP gain from Aksyon			

==== Hagonoy ====
Incumbent Mayor Amboy Manlapaz is term-limited; his wife Baby will run in his place. Among the opponents are incumbent Vice Mayor Angelboy Cruz and former Vice Mayor Pedro Santos.

Hagonoy mayoral election
Party	Candidate	Votes	%
PDP–Laban	Baby Manlapaz	22,147	33.44
NUP	Jhane dela Cruz	18,387	27.76
Lapiang K	Angelboy Cruz	15,116	22.82
Aksyon	Kap Mila Lacap	6,396	9.65
PDP–Laban	Pedro Kap Santos	4,175	6.30
Total votes		66,221	100
PDP–Laban hold			

With incumbent Vice Mayor Angelboy Cruz running for mayor, the post will now be disputed by incumbent councilor Rey Santos and Ate Charo Sy-Alvarado, the daughter of incumbent Vice Governor Wilhelmino Sy-Alvarado.

Hagonoy vice mayoral election
Party	Candidate	Votes	%
PDP–Laban	Ate Charo Sy-Alvarado	39,734	64.12
Aksyon	Rey Santos	18,042	29.11
NUP	Kap Medic Dionisio	4,192	6.76
Total votes		61,968	100
PDP–Laban gain from Lapiang K			

==== Paombong ====
Incumbent Mayor Ann Marcos is running for her third and final term against incumbent Vice Mayor Maria Cristina Gonzales.

Paombong mayoral election
Party	Candidate	Votes	%
PDP–Laban	Ann Marcos	17,173	52.83
NUP	Maria Cristina Gonzales	15,150	46.61
Independent	Obaldo Cabantog	178	0.54
Total votes		32,501	100
PDP–Laban hold			

Incumbent Vice Mayor Maria Cristina Gonzales will run as Mayor.

Paombong vice mayoral election
Party	Candidate	Votes	%
Independent	Emelita Yunson	10,346	33.03
NUP	July Valencia	10,329	32.98
PDP–Laban	Arnold Mendoza	9,305	29.71
Independent	Corazon Suerte Felipe	1,334	4.26
Total votes		31,314	100
Independent gain from NUP			

==== Pulilan ====
Incumbent Mayor Maritz Montejo is running for her third and final term. Among her opponents is the incumbent Vice Mayor Rec Candido and former Councilor Puroy Valenzuela.

Pulilan mayoral election
Party	Candidate	Votes	%
Nacionalista	Maritz Ochoa Montejo	29,273	51.94
Aksyon	Rec Candido	25,313	44.92
Reporma	Puroy Valenzuela	1,764	3.13
Total votes		56,350	100
Nacionalista hold			

Incumbent Vice Mayor Rec Candido will run as Mayor; his party selected incumbent Councilor RJ Peralta as their Vice Mayoralty candidate. Peralta's opponent is Municipal ABC and Barangay Sto. Cristo Chairman Dennis Cruz.

Pulilan vice mayoral election
Party	Candidate	Votes	%
Aksyon	RJ Peralta	28,700	53.50
Nacionalista	Kap Dennis Cruz	24,942	46.49
Total votes		53,642	100
Aksyon hold			

=== 2nd District ===
- Municipalities: Baliuag, Bustos, Plaridel

==== Baliuag ====
Incumbent Mayor Ferdie Estrella is running for his third and final term against incumbent Vice Mayor Cris Clemente.

Baliuag mayoral election
Party	Candidate	Votes	%
PDP–Laban	Ferdie Estrella	53,339	58.19
NUP	Cris Clemente	38,312	41.80
Total votes		91,651	100
PDP–Laban hold			

Incumbent Vice Mayor Cris Clemente is term-limited and will run for Mayor instead. Vice Mayoralty race will now be disputed by both incumbent Councilors Madette Quimpo and Buko dela Cruz.

Baliuag vice mayoral election
Party	Candidate	Votes	%
NUP	Madette Quimpo	63,025	70.56
Aksyon	Buko dela Cruz	26,291	29.43
Total votes		89,316	100
NUP hold			

==== Bustos ====
Incumbent Mayor Francis "Iskul" Juan is running for his second term and will be up against incumbent Vice Mayor Arnel Mendoza.

Bustos mayoral election
Party	Candidate	Votes	%
PDP–Laban	Iskul Juan	26,716	63.51
NUP	Arnel Mendoza	15,162	36.04
KBL	Angel Principio	183	0.43
Total votes		42,061	100
PDP–Laban hold			

With incumbent Vice Mayor Arnel Mendoza running for mayor, his party nominated Barangay Poblacion chairman Chito Hernandez for his post. He will be running against former vice mayor Loida Rivera, among many other candidates.

Bustos vice mayoral election
Party	Candidate	Votes	%
Independent	Martin Angeles	13,618	32.49
Independent	Atty. Keith Lazaro	9,314	22.22
NUP	Chito Hernandez	8,673	20.69
PDP–Laban	Loida Rivera	7,196	17.17
Independent	Engr. Glecy Perez	3,107	7.41
Total votes		41,908	100
Independent gain from NUP			

==== Plaridel ====
Incumbent Mayor Tessie Vistan did not seek re-election; her daughter, former Mayor Jocell, will be running in her place. Jocell will be up against incumbent Vice Mayor Mhel de Leon.

Plaridel mayoral election
Party	Candidate	Votes	%
NUP	Ate Jocell Vistan	35,381	61.37
Independent	Mhel de Leon	22,264	38.62
Total votes		57,645	100
NUP hold			

Incumbent Vice Mayor Mhel de Leon is term-limited and will run for Mayor. The vice mayoral post will now be disputed between incumbent councilor Lorie Vinta and aspirant Eddie Salonga, who lost in the 2016 elections for the same post.

Plaridel vice mayoral election
Party	Candidate	Votes	%
NUP	Lorie Vinta	32,817	60.36
Reform	Eddie Salonga	21,549	39.63
Total votes		54,366	100
NUP gain from Independent			

=== 3rd District ===
- Municipalities: Doña Remedios Trinidad, San Ildefonso, San Miguel, San Rafael

==== Doña Remedios Trinidad ====
Incumbent Mayor Marie Flores will be switching places with her husband, incumbent Vice Mayor Ronaldo Flores.

Doña Remedios Trinidad mayoral election
Party	Candidate	Votes	%
NUP	RTF Flores	15,329	79.78
PROMDI	Tito de Leon	2,333	12.14
Reform	Dadeng Punzal	1,551	8.07
Total votes		19,213	100
NUP hold			

Incumbent Vice Mayor Ronaldo Flores will be switching places with his wife, incumbent Mayor Marie Flores.

Doña Remedios Trinidad vice mayoral election
Party	Candidate	Votes	%
NUP	Marie Flores	11,954	64.94
Reform	Unyo Resigurado	4,378	23.78
PROMDI	Noli Enriquez	2,074	11.26
Total votes		18,406	100
NUP hold			

==== San Ildefonso ====
Incumbent Mayor Carla Galvez-Tan will be running for her third and final term against incumbent Councilor Gazo Galvez.

San Ildefonso mayoral election
Party	Candidate	Votes	%
Aksyon	Gazo Galvez	33,893	50.19
NUP	Carla Galvez	33,629	49.80
Total votes		67,522	100
Aksyon gain from NUP			

Incumbent Vice Mayor Rocky Sarmiento will be running for his second term.

San Ildefonso vice mayoral election
Party	Candidate	Votes	%
NUP	Rocky Sarmiento	38,203	61.24
Aksyon	Ven Lipana	24,175	38.75
Total votes		62,378	100
NUP hold			

==== San Miguel ====
Incumbent Mayor Roderick Tiongson will be running for his second term.

San Miguel mayoral election
Party	Candidate	Votes	%
NUP	Roderick Tiongson	51,453	60.94
Aksyon	Kuya Jiboy Cabochan	31,762	37.61
KBL	Pop Buencamino	942	1.11
Independent	Mona Labitoria-Visperas	275	0.32
Total votes		84,432	100
NUP hold			

Incumbent Vice Mayor Bong Alvarez will be running for his third and final term against incumbent Councilor Melvin Santos.

San Miguel vice mayoral election
Party	Candidate	Votes	%
NUP	Bong Alvarez	42,887	55.61
Reform	Kap Konsi Melvin Santos	34,223	44.38
Total votes		77,110	100
NUP hold			

==== San Rafael ====
Incumbent Mayor Goto Violago is term-limited; his son, former Provincial Board Member Cholo, will be running in his place unopposed.

San Rafael mayoral election
Party	Candidate	Votes	%
Lakas	Cholo Violago	42,771	100
Total votes		42,771	100
Lakas hold			

Incumbent Vice Mayor Edison Veneracion is term-limited; his wife Lyn will be running in his place unopposed.

San Rafael vice mayoral election
Party	Candidate	Votes	%
Lakas	Lyn Veneracion	41,466	100
Total votes		41,466	100
Lakas hold			

=== 4th District ===
- Cities: Meycauayan
- Municipalities: Marilao, Obando

==== Meycauayan ====
Incumbent City Mayor Linabelle Villarica will run for a seat as Fourth District Representative; her husband, incumbent Fourth District Representative Henry Villarica will be running in her place as City Mayor, against six other candidates.

Meycauayan mayoral election
Party	Candidate	Votes	%
PDP–Laban	Atorni Henry Villarica	74,752	70.07
Aksyon	Elmer Paguio	14,842	13.91
Independent	Jojo Manzano	11,002	10.31
KBL	Doc Abe Bordador	5,007	4.69
PRP	JJ Manzano	724	0.67
Independent	Sergio Perez	187	0.17
Independent	Clark Marquez	163	0.15
Total votes		106,677	100
PDP–Laban hold			

Incumbent Vice Mayor Jojie Violago will be running unopposed for the second straight election.

Meycauayan vice mayoral election
Party	Candidate	Votes	%
PDP–Laban	Jojie Violago	76,685	100
Total votes		76,685	100
PDP–Laban hold			

==== Marilao ====
Incumbent Mayor Ricky Silvestre will be running for his second term against former opponent Atty. Jem Sy.

Marilao mayoral election
Party	Candidate	Votes	%
PDP–Laban	Ricky Silvestre	43,124	50.15
Aksyon	Atty. Jem Sy	42,853	49.84
Total votes		85,977	100
PDP–Laban hold			

Incumbent Vice Mayor Henry Lutao is running for his third and final term against incumbent councilor Irma Celones.

Marilao vice mayoral election
Party	Candidate	Votes	%
PDP–Laban	Henry Lutao	37,015	44.64
PFP	Jessa Mahilac	25,236	30.43
NUP	Irma Celones	20,666	24.92
Total votes		82,917	100
PDP–Laban hold			

==== Obando ====
Incumbent Mayor Edwin Santos is term limited; his wife Espie will run in his place against incumbent Councilor Ding Valeda.

Obando mayoral election
Party	Candidate	Votes	%
NUP	Ding Valeda	15,232	51.98
PDP–Laban	Espie Santos	7,555	25.78
PROMDI	Artus Sayao	6,513	22.22
Total votes		29,300	100
NUP gain from PDP–Laban			

Incumbent Vice Mayor Arvin Dela Cruz is running for his third and final term and will be up against the incumbent Mayor Edwin Santos.

Obando vice mayoral election
Party	Candidate	Votes	%
NUP	Kuya Arvin Dela Cruz	17,835	62.56
PDP–Laban	Edwin Santos	7,739	27.14
PROMDI	Sandy Reyes	2,934	10.29
Total votes		28,508	100
NUP hold			

=== 5th District ===
- Municipalities: Balagtas, Bocaue, Guiguinto, Pandi

==== Balagtas ====
Incumbent Mayor Eladio Gonzales Jr. is running for his third and final term.

Balagtas mayoral election
Party	Candidate	Votes	%
PDP–Laban	JR Gonzales	23,692	53.32
NUP	Lito Polintan	20,737	46.67
Total votes		44,429	100
PDP–Laban hold			

Incumbent Vice Mayor Ariel Valderama is running for his second term.

Balagtas Vice mayoral election
Party	Candidate	Votes	%
PDP–Laban	Ariel Valderama	23,604	54.87
NUP	ABC Mel Ventura	19,407	45.12
Total votes		43,011	100
PDP–Laban hold			

==== Bocaue ====
Incumbent mayor Jose Santiago Jr., who assumed office upon the death of former mayor Joni Villanueva-Tugna, will be running for his full term against former mayor Eduardo Villanueva Jr.

Bocaue mayoral election
Party	Candidate	Votes	%
NUP	Jonjon JJV Villanueva	35,488	52.93
PDP–Laban	JJS Santiago	31,550	47.06
Total votes		67,038	100
NUP gain from PDP–Laban			

Incumbent vice mayor Alvin Cotaco opted to run for councilor, and his party nominated former CIBAC party-list representative Sherwin Tugna, widower of former Mayor Joni Villanueva-Tugna, for the post instead. He will run against incumbent Councilor and former vice mayor Kennedy Valdez.

Bocaue vice mayoral election
Party	Candidate	Votes	%
NUP	Mr. Mayor Joni Tugna	43,001	65.33
PDP–Laban	Ken Valdez	21,181	32.18
Independent	RSDC dela Cruz	1,637	2.48
Total votes		65,819	100
NUP hold			

==== Guiguinto ====
Incumbent Mayor Boy Cruz is term-limited and is running as Representative for the newly created Fifth District of Bulacan; his daughter Agay will run in his place and will be up against incumbent Vice Mayor JJ Santos.

Guiguinto mayoral election
Party	Candidate	Votes	%
PDP–Laban	Agay Cruz	36,004	54.91
NUP	JJ Santos	29,565	45.08
Total votes		65,569	100
PDP–Laban hold			

Agay's running mate is former vice mayor Banjo Estrella, who will run for the same post against incumbent councilor Eva Villanueva.

Guiguinto vice mayoral election
Party	Candidate	Votes	%
PDP–Laban	Banjo Estrella	36,090	57.35
Independent	Eva Villanueva	26,055	41.40
Independent	Alamar Castillo	776	1.23
Total votes		62,921	100
PDP–Laban gain from Independent			

==== Pandi ====
Incumbent Mayor Rico Roque will be running for his second term.

Pandi mayoral election
Party	Candidate	Votes	%
NUP	Rico Roque	50,318	66.13
PDP–Laban	Cris Castro	22,320	29.33
KBL	Cris Castro	3,216	4.22
PRP	Kuya Ed Gaba	226	0.29
Total votes		76,080	100
NUP hold			

Incumbent Vice Mayor Lui Sebastian will be running for her second term.

Pandi vice mayoral election
Party	Candidate	Votes	%
NUP	Lui Sebastian	36,663	51.44
PDP–Laban	Sonny Antonio	33,354	46.80
KBL	Sol Antonio	1,250	1.75
Total votes		71,267	100
NUP hold			

=== 6th District ===
- Municipalities: Angat, Norzagaray, Santa Maria

==== Angat ====
Incumbent Mayor Narding de Leon is term-limited, and will be running for Vice Mayor instead.

Angat mayoral election
Party	Candidate	Votes	%
Aksyon	Jowar Bautista	22,797	63.85
NUP	Jumong Piadozo	12,175	34.10
Independent	Tantan Cruz	731	2.04
Total votes		35,703	100
Aksyon gain from NUP			

Incumbent Vice Mayor Jowar Bautista will be running for Mayor this time.

Angat vice mayoral election
Party	Candidate	Votes	%
Aksyon	Arvin Agustin	18,148	51.99
NUP	Narding de Leon	16,754	48.00
Total votes		34,902	100
Aksyon hold			

==== Norzagaray ====
Incumbent Mayor Fred Germar is term-limited and is running as Representative for the newly created Sixth District of Bulacan; his wife Merlyn will run in his place and will be up against former Acting Mayor Ade Cristobal.

Norzagaray mayoral election
Party	Candidate	Votes	%
NUP	Merlyn Germar	32,035	51.01
PDP–Laban	Ade Cristobal	30,760	48.98
Total votes		62,795	100
NUP hold			

Incumbent Vice Mayor Boyet Santos will be running for his second term.

Norzagaray vice mayoral election
Party	Candidate	Votes	%
PDP–Laban	Baldo Gener	34,298	57.11
NUP	Boyet Santos	24,079	40.09
Independent	Julio Cristobal	1,672	2.78
Total votes		60,049	100
PDP–Laban gain from NUP			

==== Santa Maria ====
Incumbent Mayor Yoyoy Pleyto decided not to run for reelection; incumbent Vice Mayor Ricky Buenaventura will be the party's mayoral candidate, against former Mayor Omeng Ramos and incumbent Chairman Rey Castro of Barangay Manggahan.

Santa Maria mayoral election
Party	Candidate	Votes	%
Aksyon	Omeng Ramos	54,165	44.21
PDP–Laban	Ricky Buenaventura	42,134	34.39
NUP	Reymalyn Castro	26,198	21.38
Total votes		122,497	100
Aksyon gain from PDP–Laban			

Since incumbent Vice Mayor Buenaventura will run as Mayor, the party selected incumbent Councilor Jun Mateo as his running mate, which will be up against four other candidates.

Santa Maria vice mayoral election
Party	Candidate	Votes	%
Liberal	Kap Eboy Juan	41,007	34.53
NUP	Obet Perez	39,788	33.50
PDP–Laban	Jun Mateo	32,503	27.37
Independent	Alberto Mateo	4,168	3.51
Independent	Nelson dela Merced	1,275	1.07
Total votes		118,741	100
Liberal gain from PDP–Laban			

=== San Jose del Monte City ===
Incumbent City Mayor Arthur Robes is running for his third and final term.

San Jose del Monte mayoral election
Party	Candidate	Votes	%
PDP–Laban	Arthur Robes	150,394	71.12
PROMDI	Atty. Earl Tan	45,182	21.36
Liberal	Mar Gatchalian	14,402	6.82
Independent	Salvador Domagtoy	1,475	0.69
Total votes		211,453	100
PDP–Laban hold			

After winning the 2019 vice mayoralty race unopposed, incumbent City Vice Mayor Efren Bartolome Jr. will be running for his third and final term against two candidates.

San Jose del Monte vice mayoral election
Party	Candidate	Votes	%
AR	Efren Bartolome Jr.	116,966	58.69
Liberal	Irene del Rosario	77,801	39.04
Independent	Arnold Sagrado	4,518	2.26
Total votes		199,285	100
AR hold			
