= Love Affairs (song) =

Single by Michael Martin Murphey

from the album Michael Martin Murphey
- B-side: "Crystal"
- Released: March 21, 1983
- Genre: Country
- Length: 3:33
- Label: Liberty
- Songwriters: Michael Martin Murphey; Mike d'Abo
- Producer: Michael Martin Murphey

Michael Martin Murphey singles chronology
| "Still Taking Chances" (1982) | "Love Affairs" (1983) | "Don't Count the Rainy Days" (1983) |

"Love Affairs" is a song recorded by American country music artist Michael Martin Murphey. It was co-written by Murphey and Mike d'Abo. It was released in March 1983 as the fourth and final single from the album Michael Martin Murphey. The song peaked at number 11 on the U.S. Billboard Hot Country Singles and at number 18 on the Canadian RPM Country Tracks chart.

The backing vocals are performed by Jennifer Warnes.

== Chart performance ==
| Chart (1983) | Peak position |
|---|---|
| US Hot Country Songs (Billboard) | 11 |
| Canadian RPM Country Tracks | 18 |
