= Still Taking Chances =

Single by Michael Martin Murphey

from the album Michael Martin Murphey
- B-side: "Lost River"
- Released: November 8, 1982
- Genre: Country
- Length: 4:12
- Label: Liberty
- Songwriter: Michael Martin Murphey
- Producer: Jim Ed Norman

Michael Martin Murphey singles chronology
"What's Forever For" (1982)	"Still Taking Chances" (1982)	"Love Affairs" (1983)

"Still Taking Chances" is a song written and recorded by American country music artist Michael Martin Murphey. It was released in November 1982 as the third single from the album Michael Martin Murphey. The song peaked at number 3 on the U.S. Billboard Hot Country Singles in early 1983 and number 76 on the U.S. Billboard Hot 100.

== Chart performance ==
Chart (1982–1983)	Peak position
US Hot Country Songs (Billboard)	3
US Adult Contemporary (Billboard)	28
US Billboard Hot 100	76
Canadian RPM Country Tracks	17
Canadian RPM Adult Contemporary Tracks	9
