= Disenchanted (Michael Martin Murphey song) =

Single by Michael Martin Murphey

from the album The Heart Never Lies
- B-side: "Sacred Heart"
- Released: April 30, 1984
- Genre: Country
- Length: 4:32
- Label: Liberty
- Songwriters: Jim Ed Norman, Chick Rains, Michael Martin Murphey
- Producer: Jim Ed Norman

Michael Martin Murphey singles chronology
"Will It Be Love by Morning" (1984)	"Disenchanted" (1984)	"Radio Land" (1984)

"Disenchanted" is a song co-written and recorded by American country music artist Michael Martin Murphey. It was released in April 1984 as the third single from the album The Heart Never Lies. The song peaked at number 12 on the U.S. Billboard Hot Country Singles and at number 11 on the Canadian RPM Country Tracks chart. It was written by Murphey, Jim Ed Norman and Chick Rains.

== Music video ==
A music video directed by Francis Delia with James Lemmo as director of photography premiered in mid-1984.

== Chart performance ==
Chart (1984)	Peak position
US Hot Country Songs (Billboard)	12
US Adult Contemporary (Billboard)	12
Canadian RPM Country Tracks	11
Canadian RPM Adult Contemporary	22
