= Daniel Fernando =

Filipino actor and politician (born 1962)

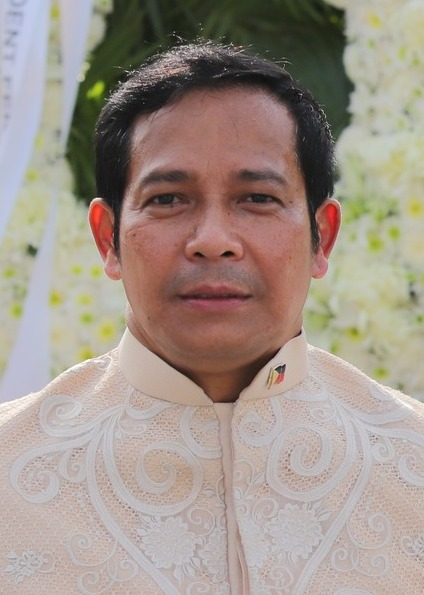
- Fernando in 2022

34th Governor of Bulacan
- Incumbent
- Assumed office June 30, 2019
- Vice Governor: Alex Castro (2022–present) Wilhelmino Sy-Alvarado (2019–2022)
- Preceded by: Wilhelmino Sy-Alvarado

Vice Governor of Bulacan
- In office June 30, 2010 – June 30, 2019
- Governor: Wilhelmino Sy-Alvarado
- Preceded by: Wilhelmino Sy-Alvarado
- Succeeded by: Wilhelmino Sy-Alvarado

Member of the Bulacan Provincial Board from the 2nd district
- In office June 30, 2001 – June 30, 2007
Barangay offices
Kabataang Barangay Chairman of Tabang, Guiguinto, Bulacan
In office
1980–1984

Personal details
- Born: Cesar Fernando Ramirez; May 12, 1962 (age 64) Guiguinto, Bulacan, Philippines
- Party: NUP (2012–2015; 2018–present)
- Other political affiliations: Liberal (2015–2018); Lakas (2001–2007; 2009–2012); PMP (2007–2009)
- Parent(s): Pablo Ramirez (father); Luningning Fernando (mother)
- Education: University of the East (BS)
- Occupation: Actor, politician

Daniel Ramirez Fernando (born Cesar Fernando Ramirez; May 12, 1962) is a Filipino actor and politician who has served as the 34th governor of Bulacan since 2019.

== Early life and education ==
Fernando was born on May 12, 1962, in Guiguinto to Pablo Gonzales Ramirez and Luningning Gonzalvo Fernando. He studied Tabang Elementary School and Bulacan College of Arts and Trade for his primary and high school education. He also studied University of the East with the degree of Business Administration Major in Management

== Entertainment career ==
Fernando formerly worked as an actor in film and television. Fernando is critically acclaimed for his performance in the 1985 controversial erotic thriller film Scorpio Nights, directed by Peque Gallaga and produced by Lily Monteverde of Regal Films.

== Political career ==
Fernando entered politics in 1980, serving as the Kabataang Barangay Chairman of Tabang, Guiguinto, Bulacan, until 1984.

=== Board Member (2001–2007) ===
Fernando served as a member of the Bulacan Provincial Board from the 2nd district from 2001 to 2007, serving for two terms.

=== Vice governor of Bulacan (2010–2019) ===
Fernando served as vice governor from 2010 to 2019 under running mate Governor Wilhelmino Sy-Alvarado, serving for three terms.

=== Governor of Bulacan (since 2019) ===
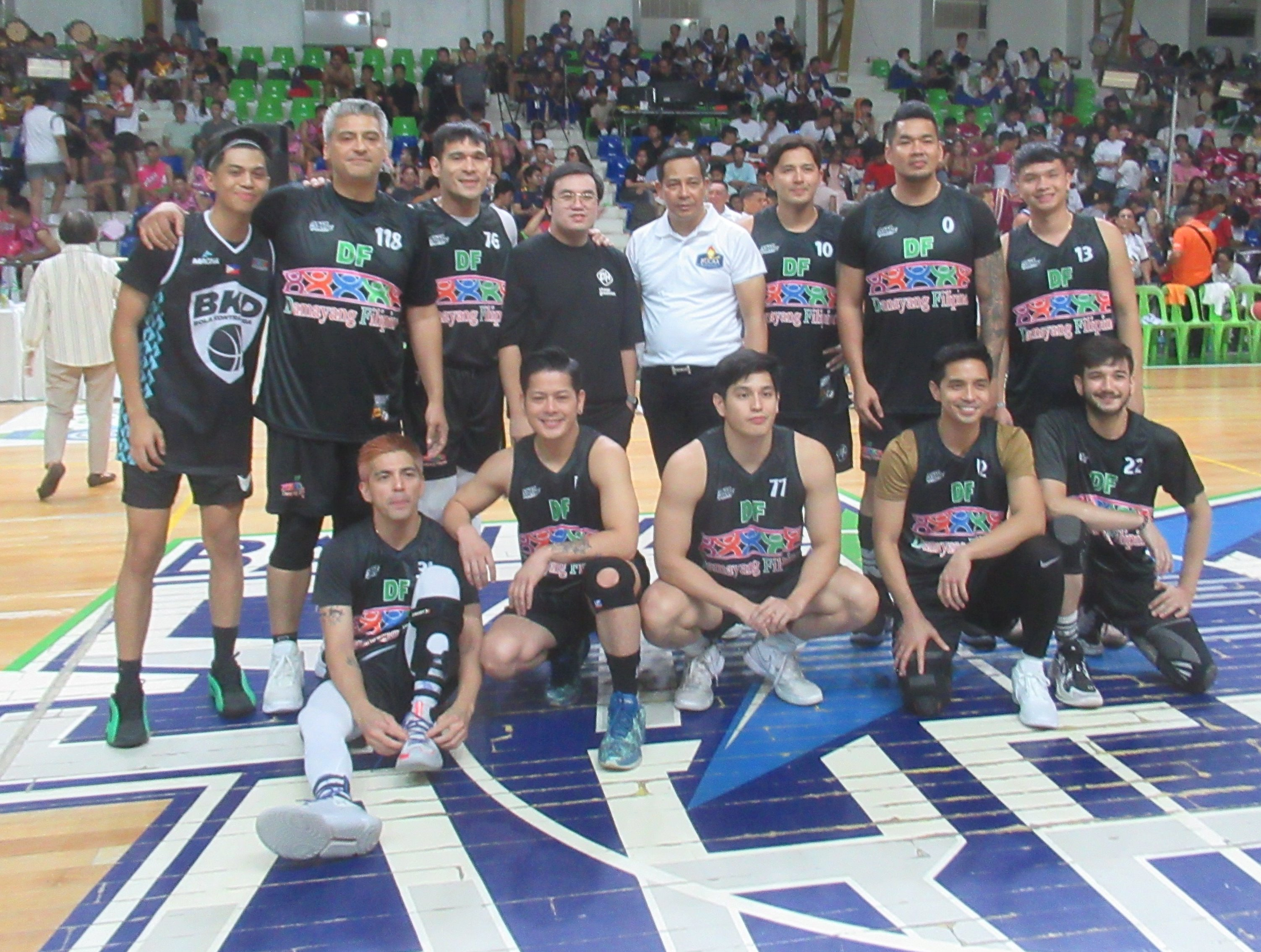
Fernando with the Bulacan University and Collegiate Athletic Association during an exhibition basketball game in Baliwag on April 15, 2024

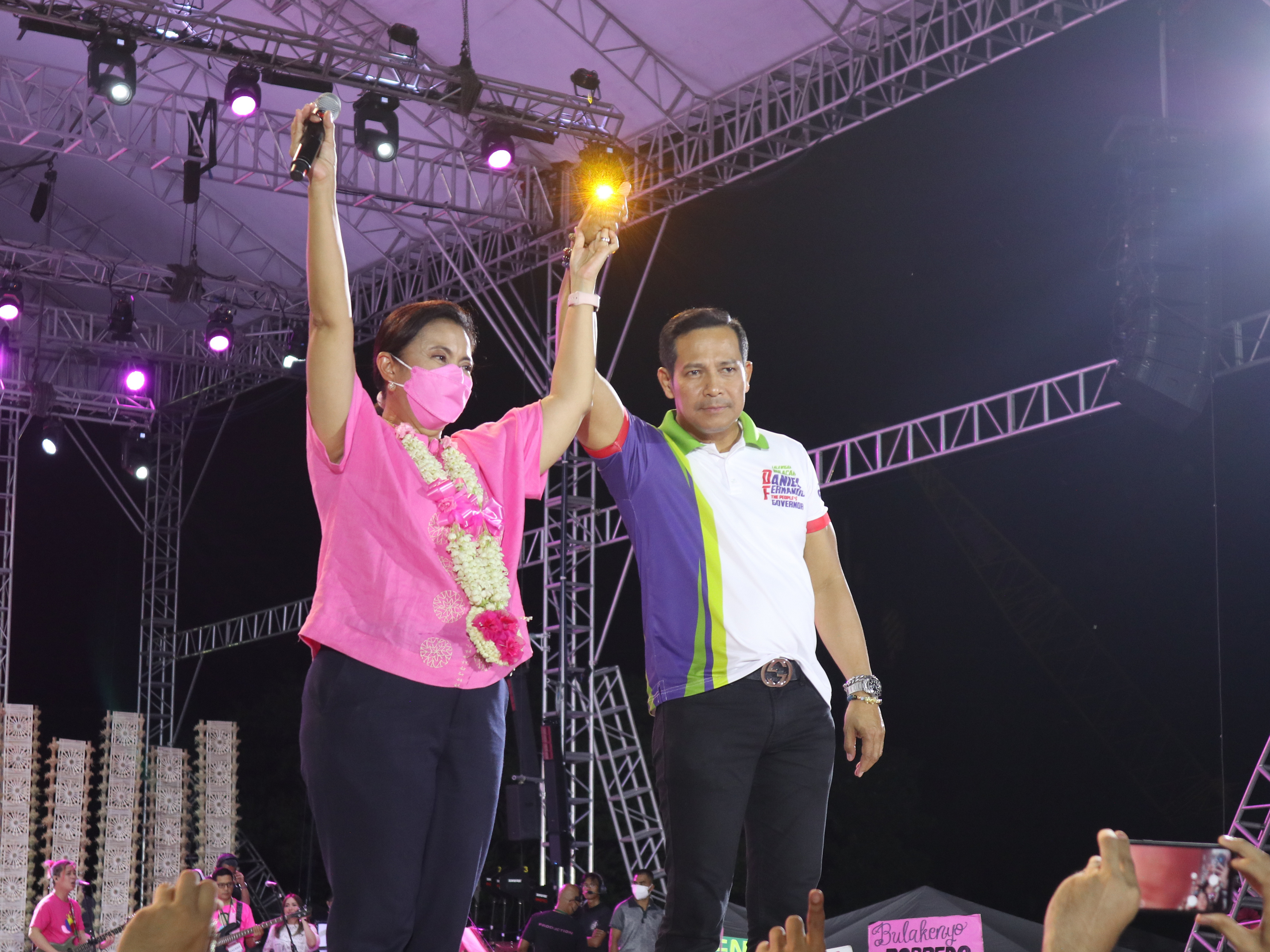
Fernando (right) raising the hand of Vice President Leni Robredo (left) to endorse her 2022 presidential campaign

Fernando announced that he would run for governor under the National Unity Party, to succeed Wilhelmino Sy-Alvarado, the incumbent governor, who is term-limited and ran as his running mate. On May 13, 2019, Fernando was elected governor, defeating Malolos mayor Christian Natividad and former councilor Teddy Natividad.

Fernando successfully ran for re-election to a second term under the National Unity Party (NUP) in 2022, with provincial board member Alex Castro as his running mate. They were re-elected in 2025. He defeated former ally Wilhelmino Sy-Alvarado in both instances.

== Controversies ==
=== Flood control ===
On May 6, 2024, whistleblower "Francisco Balagtas" filed with the Ombudsman a 3-page complaint dated May 1, 2024, against Fernando, Alex Castro, other local officials, including TCSC Corporation's owners-officers Dionisio Toreja, President, Engr. Bernie Pacheco, Vice President for Mining and others. The corruption case stemmed from the alleged anomalous ₱500 million Bulacan Flood Control and River Restoration Project, including TCSC's Bulacan dredging projects.

=== NLEX road rage incident ===
Fernando drew criticism following a road rage incident on the North Luzon Expressway (NLEX) involving his official convoy on February 21, 2026. Reports surfaced that the Fernando's multi-vehicle motorcade occupied four lanes of the expressway, obstructing traffic and allegedly harassing a motorist who attempted to overtake. DILG Secretary Jonvic Remulla cautioned Fernando against "acting like a king" on public roads. Following a formal investigation by the Land Transportation Office, Fernando denied the allegations of harassment, but surrendered firearms and vehicles involved to the Police Regional Office 3 for inspection.

== Filmography ==
=== Film ===
Year	Title	Role
1985	Scorpio Nights	Danny
1985	Turuang Apoy	
1986	Takaw Tukso	
1986	Tukso sa Mundo	
1987	Laruang Putik	
1987	When Good Girls Go Wrong	
1988	Macho Dancer	Noel
1988	Hamunin ang Bukas...	
1989	Huminga Ka Na Hangga't Gusto Mo!	
1990	Bad Boy	Jinggoy
1991	Huwag Mong Salingin ang Sugat Ko (The Buena Vista Story)	
1992	Cordora: Lulutang Ka sa Sarili Mong Dugo	
1992	Grease Gun Gang	Pandong Eta
1992	Dillinger ng Dose Pares	Allan
1993	Gaano Kita Kamahal	Gadong
1993	Ronquillo: Tubong Cavite, Laking Tondo	Abad
1994	Mistah	Daniel Aquino
1994	Bratpack (Mga Pambayad Atraso)	Terrorist
1994	Gen. Tapia: Sa Nagbabagang Lupa	Hassan
1994	Markadong Hudas	Col. Manolo Nantes
1994	Col. Billy Bibit, RAM	Capt. Lapeña
1995	P're Hanggang sa Huli	Waldo
1995	Dodong Scarface	
1995	The Grepor Butch Belgica Story	Boy del Pan
1995	Ang Tipo Kong Lalake (Maginoo pero Medyo Bastos)	Tequila
1996	Sobra-Sobra, Labis-Labis	
1996	Kristo	Simon the Zealot
1996	Bilang Na ang Araw Mo	Andy
1996	To Saudi with Love	Abel
1996	Bakit May Kahapon Pa?	Mulong
1996	Isa Lang ang Dapat Mahalin	Rafael
1996	Sgt. Pantaleon	Miguel
1996	Mga Nagbabagang Labi	
1997	Tawagin Mo Na ang Lahat ng Santo	Nardo
1997	Mariano Mison... NBI	Sarge
1997	Buhay Mo'y Buhay Ko Rin	Corpuz
1997	Winasak Na pangarap	Romy
1997	Kaliwat Kanan, Sakit ng Katawan	Gani
1998	Pagbabalik ng Probinsyano	Ayangwa
1998	Miss, Gabi Na	
1998	Ama Namin	Ka Benjie
1998	Init ng Dugo	
1999	Sa Iyo ang Sarap, Akin ang Hirap	
1999	Suspek	Marko
1999	Ratratan	
1999	Bitay! Lethal Injection	
2001	Hostage	
2001	Mananabas	Col. Rolando Garcia
2001	Hiyas... Sa Paraiso ng Kasalanan	
2001	Tatarin	Dodong
2002	Walang Iba Kundi Ikaw	
2002	Biyahera	Lucas
2003	Bangkero	
2003	Woman of Breakwater	Tatay
2003	Biktima: Campus Coed	
2003	Filipinas	Dindo
2010	Dagim	Elias
2011	Remington and the Curse of the Zombadings	Suarez
2013	Barber's Tales (Mga Kuwentong Barbero)	Jose
TBA	Malvar: Tuloy ang Laban	Emilio Jacinto

=== Television ===
Year	Title	Role
1993	Noli Me Tangere	Elias
1995	Bayani	Panday Pira
1998	Bayani	Datu Ali
1999	Kirara, Ano ang Kulay ng Pag-ibig?	Ka Puroy
2003	Magpakailanman: The Bert "Tawa" Marcelo Story	Andoy
2005	Encantadia	Bartimus
2005	Etheria: Ang Ikalimang Kaharian ng Encantadia	Cilatus
2006	Encantadia: Pag-ibig Hanggang Wakas	Cilatus
2007	Mga Kuwento ni Lola Basyang	Teong
2007	Sine Novela: My Only Love	Luisito
2007	Mga Mata ni Anghelita	Isaac
2008	E.S.P.	
2009	Totoy Bato	Leon Hernandez
2009	Obra	Mayor
2009	Agimat: Ang Mga Alamat ni Ramon Revilla: Tiagong Akyat	Red Capulong
2010	Noah	Arturo "Toro" Mamaril
2011	Sisid	Hamil Cordelia
2011	Amaya	Maguinto
2013	Muling Buksan ang Puso	Ignacio Andrada
2015	Yagit	Carlos Madrigal
2017	FPJ's Ang Probinsyano	Jack Chan
2017	Ikaw Lang ang Iibigin	Rigor Villoria

Political offices
Preceded by Wilhelmino Sy-Alvarado	Vice Governor of Bulacan; 2010–2019	Succeeded by Wilhelmino Sy-Alvarado
Preceded by Wilhelmino Sy-Alvarado	Governor of Bulacan; 2019–present	Incumbent
Awards
Preceded by Ace Vergel	Gawad Urian for Best Actor; 1990	Succeeded by Phillip Salvador
