= National Movement of Young Legislators =

Lawmaker group in the Philippines

The National Movement of Young Legislators (NMYL), is a group of elected local lawmakers in the Philippines who are aged 40 years or younger. The local lawmakers are elected officials who hold positions such as municipal/city councilor, municipal/city vice mayor, provincial board member, and provincial vice governor.

== History ==
NMYL was formed by the Presidential Council for Youth Affairs (PCYA) under President Corazon Aquino as part of her administration's youth development agenda. Elected NMYL's founding president was Senator Kiko Pangilinan in 1989, when he was still a councilor of Quezon City, Philippines. He saw the need to unite and develop young legislators to develop committed, strong, and principled leaders among youth legislators.

== Past Presidents and Officers ==
- Kiko Pangilinan - Philippine Senator; Councilor of Quezon City; NMYL Founding President
- Josefina De la Cruz - Governor of Bulacan; NMYL President
- Edgar M. Chatto - Philippine Congressman; Bohol Vice Governor; NMYL President
- Del De Guzman - Philippine Congressman; Vice Mayor of Marikina; NMYL President
- Herbert Bautista - Vice Mayor of Quezon City; NMYL President
- Julian ML. Coseteng - Councilor of Quezon City; NMYL President (2004–2007)
- Cecilia Clare N. Reyes - Provincial Board Member of Isabela Province; NMYL President (2007–2010)
- Phanie Teves - Vice Mayor of Muntinlupa; Councilor; NMYL Vice President for Metro Manila (2019–2022)
