= Radio Land =

Single by Michael Martin Murphey

from the album The Heart Never Lies
- B-side: "The Heart Never Lies"
- Released: August 25, 1984
- Genre: Country
- Length: 4:01
- Label: Liberty
- Songwriters: Michael Martin Murphey, Chick Rains, Jim Ed Norman
- Producer: Jim Ed Norman

Michael Martin Murphey singles chronology
"Disenchanted" (1984)	"Radio Land" (1984)	"What She Wants" (1984)

"Radio Land" is a song co-written and recorded by American country music artist Michael Martin Murphey. It was released in August 1984 as the fourth single from The Heart Never Lies. The song reached #19 on the Billboard Hot Country Singles & Tracks chart. The song was written by Murphey, Chick Rains and Jim Ed Norman.

== Chart performance ==
Chart (1984)	Peak position
US Hot Country Songs (Billboard)	19
Canadian RPM Country Tracks	30
