= Maybe This Time (2014 film) =

- Maybe This Time theatrical movie poster
- Directed by: Jerry Lopez Sineneng
- Written by: Roumella Nina Monge; Anton C. Santamaria; Vanessa R. Valdez
- Produced by: Charo Santos-Concio; Malou N. Santos; Vic del Rosario, Jr.
- Starring: Sarah Geronimo; Coco Martin; Ruffa Gutierrez
- Cinematography: Mo Zee
- Edited by: Marya Ignacio
- Music by: Jesse Lasaten
- Production companies: ABS-CBN Film Productions Inc.; Viva Films
- Distributed by: Star Cinema
- Release date: May 28, 2014
- Country: Philippines
- Languages: Filipino; English
- Box office: ₱140,598,900.00 (US$3,124,420.00)

Maybe This Time is a 2014 Filipino romantic comedy film directed by Jerry Lopez Sineneng starring Sarah Geronimo and Coco Martin. The film, produced by ABS-CBN Film Productions Inc. and Viva Films and distributed by Star Cinema, premiered in the Philippines on May 28, 2014.

The film, which was labelled as 2014's summer movie Valentine, was the first team-up of Geronimo and Martin on the big screen after having previously worked together in the TV series 1DOL. It earned ₱20,000,000.00 on the first day of its release.

== Synopsis ==
Steph Asuncion (Sarah Geronimo) and Tonio Bugayong (Coco Martin) were once in love. Back then, she was a young girl who wanted a simple life and he was older, more ambitious than she was. Tonio was a small town guy who wants to board a ship to provide for his family’s furniture business. Steph was a Manila girl who spends the summer in the province for community service. What might have been a sweet relationship ended sourly when Tonio left without saying goodbye. Steph was heartbroken and it taught her to dream bigger to be worthy of love. Will their paths cross again? Will they overcome the pains of the past to give love a second chance?

This is a story between two people who will be reminded about the importance of being true to one’s self in order for true love to happen.

== Cast and characters ==
=== Main ===
- Sarah Geronimo as Stephanie "Steph"/ "Teptep" Asuncion
- Coco Martin as Antonio "Tonio" Bugayong
- Ruffa Gutierrez as Monica T. Valencia

=== Supporting ===
- Ogie Diaz as Mae
- Dennis Padilla as Erning
- Shamaine Buencamino as Lenny
- Buboy Garovillo as Butch
- Marlann Flores as Mels
- Zeppi Borromeo as Jans
- Kathleen Hermosa as Clara
- Alex Castro as Patrick
- Devon Seron as Abby
- Marco Masa as Danno
- Bea Basa as Porky
- Sofia Millares as Kimberly
- Aaron Junatas as Hyro
- Minnie Aguilar as Elma
- Dante Ponce as Andrew
- Marina Benipayo as Carmen
- Cecil Paz as Susan
- Tony Mabesa as Pancho

== Production ==
=== Development and casting ===
Originally, Martin was supposed to star with Marian Rivera in a movie also entitled Maybe This Time. The film was supposed to have been helmed by Maryo J. de los Reyes and produced by Regal Films for an early-2013 release. The film likewise would have co-starred Snooky Serna as Martin's mother and was touted as bringing together talents from both ABS-CBN and GMA. The movie, however, was ultimately shelved.

The announcement of the main casts for the film was made on February 8, 2014. The details were first discussed through a meeting on January 21, 2014. At the time, although there were no official announcements for the movie yet, it was already publicized that Geronimo and Martin would be the leads, together with Ruffa Gutierrez, and will be directed by Jerry Lopez Sineneng.

=== Promotion ===
On March 1, 2014, the official theme song of the movie accompanied by a music video was released. The film's theme "Maybe This Time" by Michael Martin Murphey was covered by the film's lead, Sarah Geronimo. Also, much later due to its popularity and resurgence, that song was also the official theme song for the war and historic drama series, Pulang Araw, which aired from July 29 to December 27, 2024. The whole team held a grand press conference on May 15, 2014, at the Dolphy Theater to talk about the film and their experiences. The next day, the first official full-length trailer was released on YouTube.
