= Maybe This Time (Michael Martin Murphey song) =

1983 song by Dave Loggins and Randy Goodrum

Song by Michael Martin Murphey

from the album The Heart Never Lies
- Language: English
- Released: August 19, 1983
- Recorded: 1983
- Genre: Country
- Length: 3:17
- Label: Liberty
- Songwriters: Dave Loggins; Randy Goodrum
- Producer: Jim Ed Norman

Licensed audio
- "Maybe This Time" on YouTube

"Maybe This Time" is a song written by Dave Loggins and Randy Goodrum. It was first recorded in 1983 by Michael Martin Murphey for his eleventh studio album The Heart Never Lies, released the same year. A popular song in the Philippines, it has been covered by various Filipino artists, including Sarah Geronimo in 2014, whose version was used as the theme song for the film of the same title, where Geronimo co-starred. And later, the song is also used as the main title theme for the war drama series Pulang Araw, which aired from July 29 to December 27, 2024.

== Sarah Geronimo version ==
"Maybe This Time"

Single by Sarah Geronimo
- Language: English
- Released: May 1, 2014
- Recorded: 2014
- Genre: Pop
- Length: 4:15
- Label: Star Music
- Songwriters: Dave Loggins; Randy Goodrum
- Producer: Jonathan Manalo

Sarah Geronimo singles chronology
"Tayo" (2013)	"Maybe This Time" (2014)	"Kilometro" (2014)

Music video
- "Maybe This Time" on YouTube

Filipino singer Sarah Geronimo released "Maybe This Time" through Star Music on May 1, 2014, as the main soundtrack to her film of the same name. It was also used as the main title theme for the historical and war drama series Pulang Araw, which aired from July 29 to December 27, 2024, coincidentally the secondary opening theme song is "Kapangyarihan", performed by Ben&Ben featuring SB19.

=== Reception ===
In a statement relayed to the press by Sunita Kaur, managing director of Spotify for Asia dated August 26, 2014, it revealed its first-ever list of most-streamed artists and songs four months after the platform was launched in the Philippines. The song came in as the most-streamed OPM song, while Geronimo came in second as the most streamed local artist, behind Eraserheads.

During the 2015 Myx Music Awards, Geronimo received the Best Remake award for the recording.

==== 2024 resurgence ====
In July 2024, the song became a favorite sound among TikTok users making fan-made videos of celebrities. Gaining traction on the platform, videos of Geronimo performing the song during the 2014 Box Office Entertainment Awards and at her 20th anniversary concert in 2024 resurfaced on the platform, fueling a song cover trend and making the song enter the Billboard Philippines Hot 100 at number 89 the week of July 27. In August, a TikTok user by the name of "donotdisturb869" posted a video of a young male student named Ralp Villaruiz dancing to bridge of the song, which went viral and started a dance challenge. Some of the personalities who took on the dance challenge are Stell of SB19, Sheena Catacutan of BINI, and BGYO.

The song (and its dance challenge) was showcased on It's Showtime on August 31, 2024, with Villaruiz himself appearing and dancing to the song. A day later, Regine Velasquez performed the song on ASAP, with Villaruiz later returning to dance. Geronimo herself later performed the song on September 1, 2024, in General Santos.

As a result of its resurgence, the song became the number one trending song on YouTube Philippines and peaked at number 23 on the Philippines Hot 100. The song also reached the top spot of United Kingdom-based online karaoke platform Sing King's August Hot Hits chart, outcharting Billie Eilish's "Birds of a Feather" and Lisa's "Rockstar". As result to its resurgence after, the song was also used as the official opening theme song for Pulang Araw, which aired on GMA Network from July 29 to December 27, 2024.

=== Charts ===
Chart (2024)	Peak position
Philippines Hot 100 (Billboard)	22
Top Philippine Songs (Billboard)	12

== Other versions ==
- Filipino singer Dingdong Avanzado recorded the song for his 1999 album Recall.
- Nonoy Zuñiga covered the song as part of his 2001 album Impressions.
- Freeverse recorded the song for their 2000 album Alive.
- Soul singer Jaya covered the song for her Real.Love.Stories album in 2009.
- Martin Nievera recorded the song for his 2009 album For Always.
- Actress Jennylyn Mercado recorded the song for her 2010 album Love Is....
