= Calumpit =

Municipality in Bulacan, Philippines

- Municipality
- Municipality of Calumpit
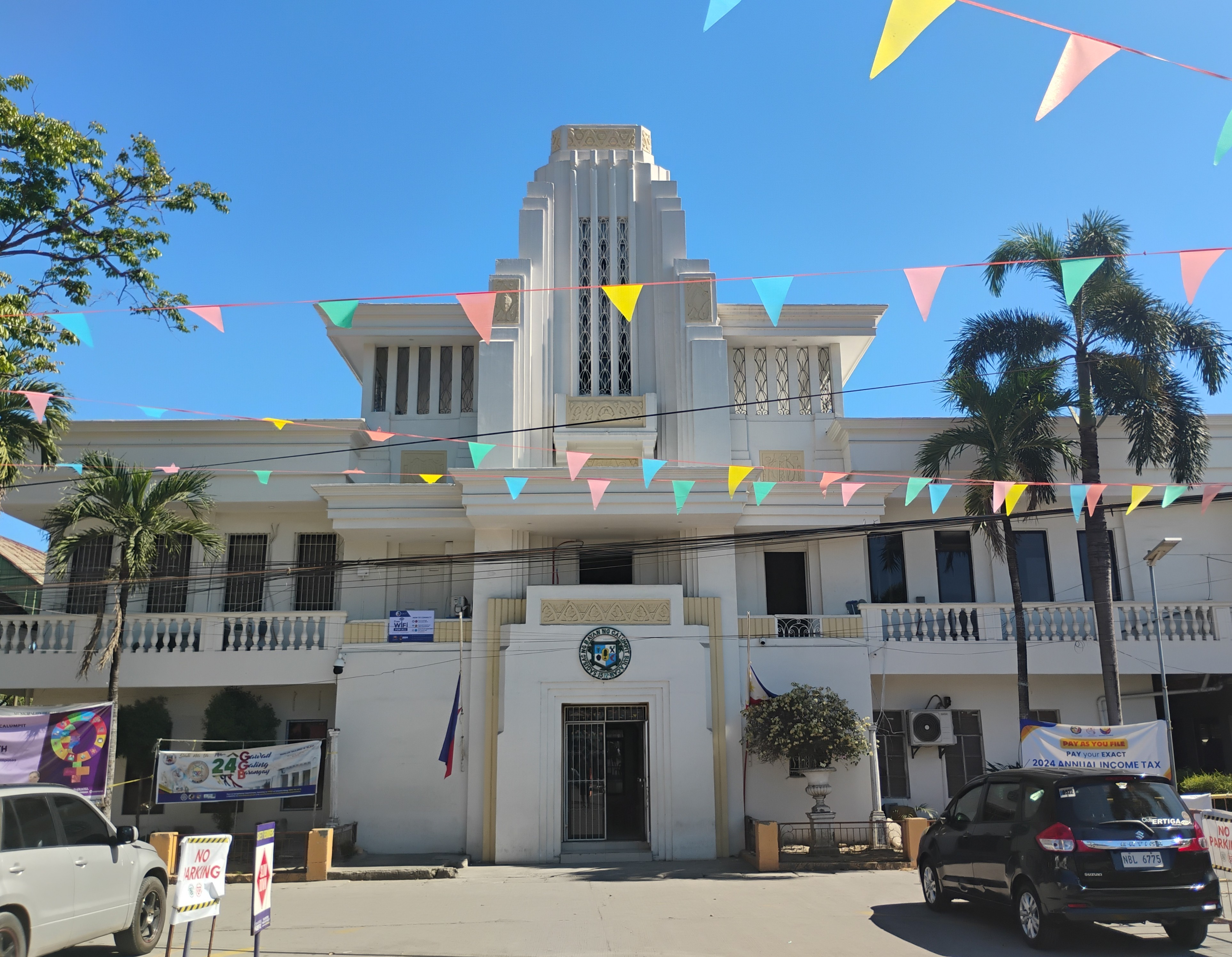
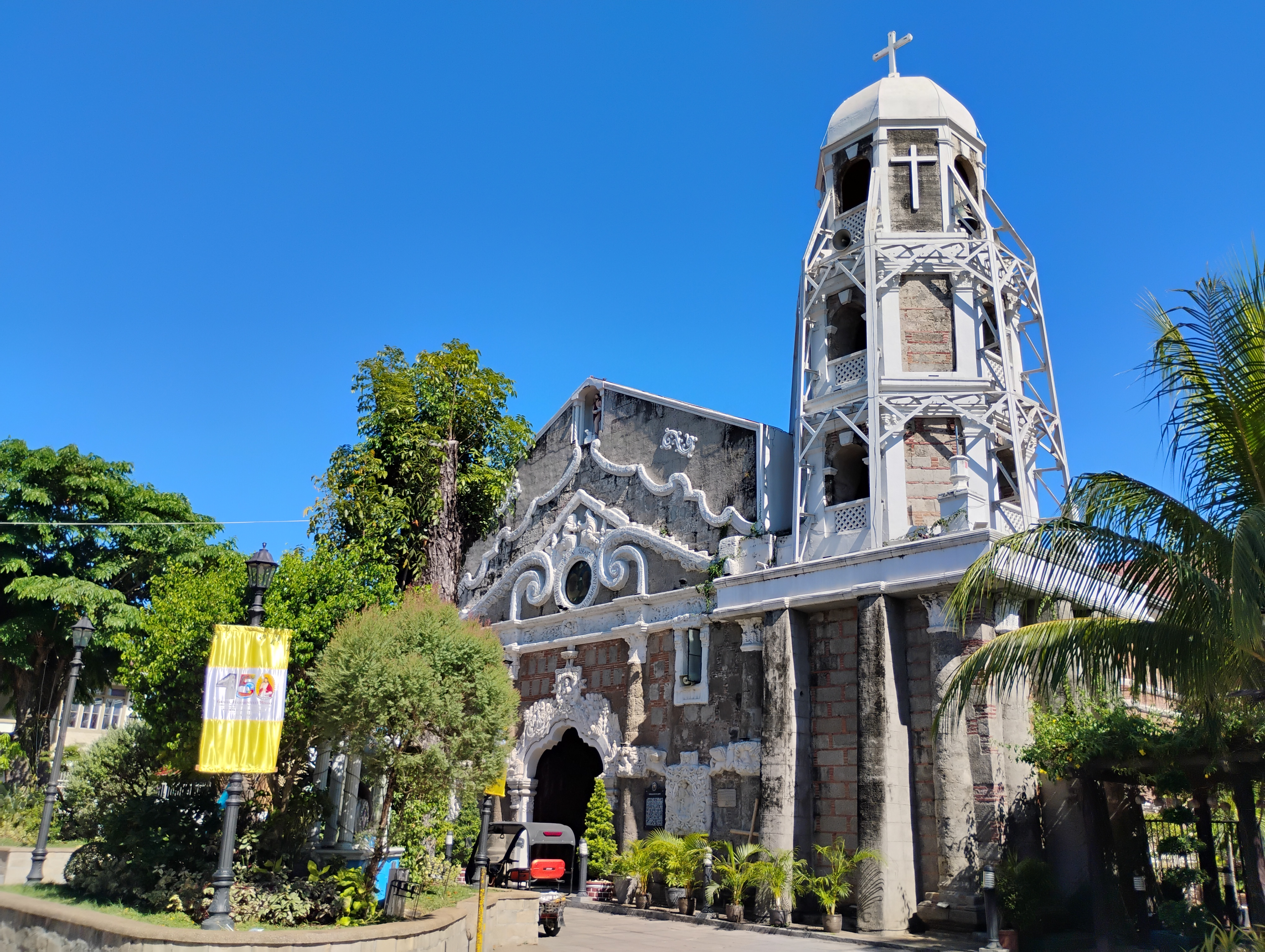
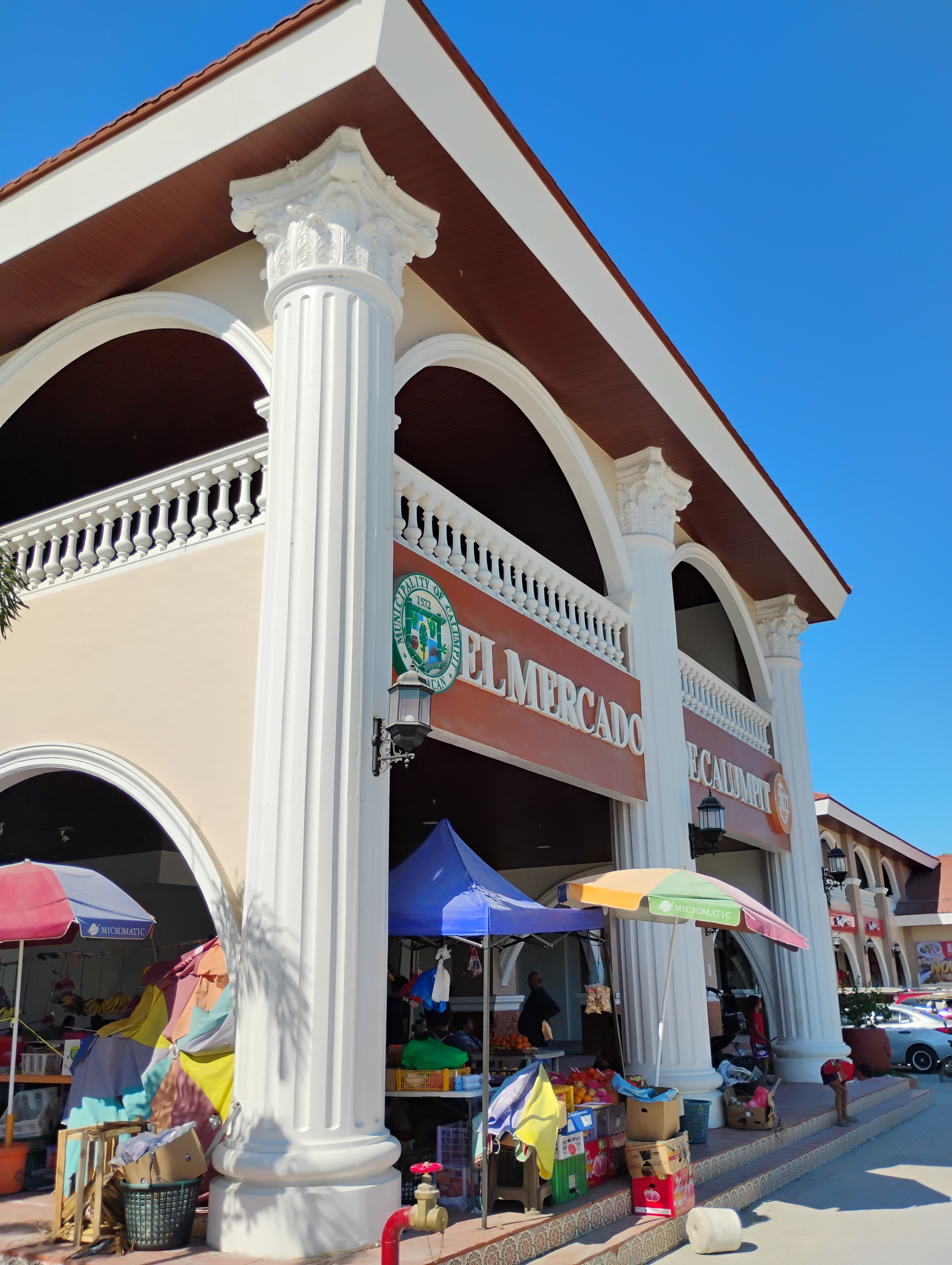
- Municipal Hall Saint John the Baptist Parish Church El Mercado de Calumpit

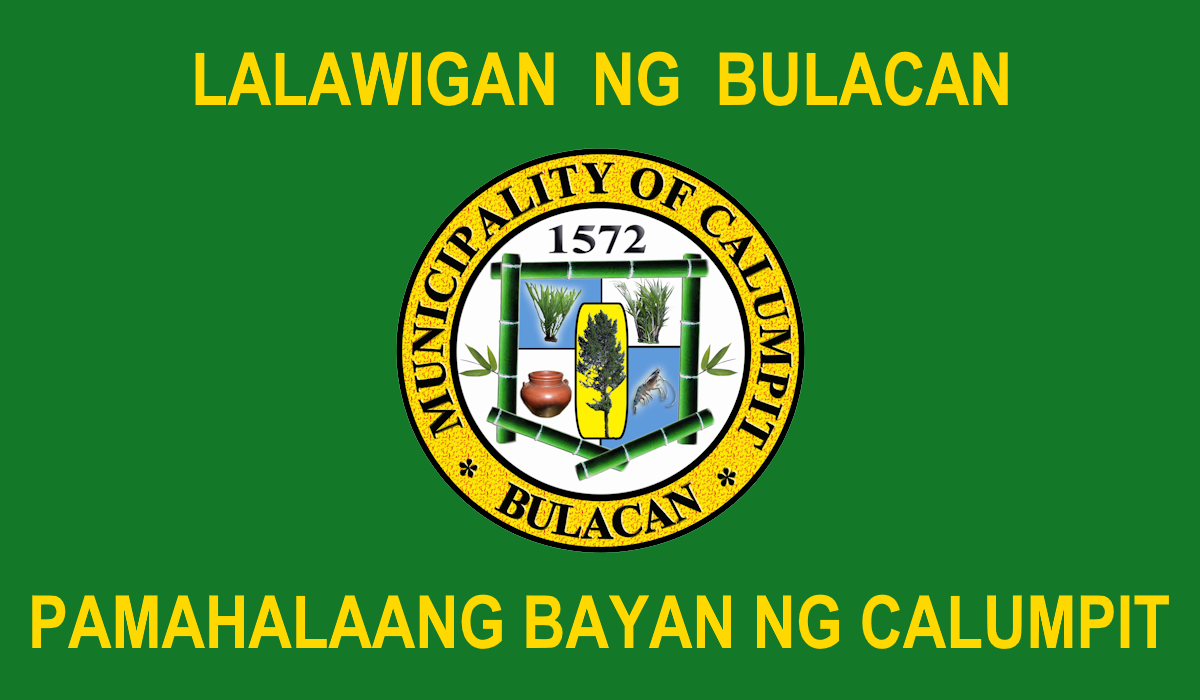
- Flag Seal
- Etymology: Kalumpít
- Motto: God Bless Calumpit
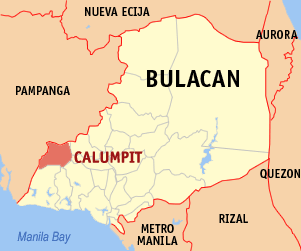
- Map of Bulacan with Calumpit highlighted
- Interactive map of Calumpit
- Location within the Philippines
- Coordinates: 14°55′N 120°46′E
- Country: Philippines
- Region: Central Luzon
- Province: Bulacan
- District: 1st district
- Founded: 14 November 1571
- Chartered: 28 December 1575
- Founder: Gat Maitim; Miguel Lopez de Legazpi; Sargento Juan Moron
- Barangays: 29 (see Barangays)

Government
  - Type: Sangguniang Bayan
  - Mayor: Glorime M. Faustino
  - Vice Mayor: Zacarias C. Candelaria
  - Representative: Danilo A. Domingo
  - Municipal Council: Members: Derreck A. Pangan; Rico John L. Pagdanganan; Gerald Mathew G. Dela Cruz; Thelma A. Dansalan; Romeo M. Bernardino, Jr.; Ricky L. Viray; Maureen I. Torres; Melanie B. Raymundo
  - Electorate: 72,324 voters (2025)

Area
  - Total: 56.25 km^{2} (21.72 sq mi)
- Elevation: 6.0 m (19.7 ft)
- Highest elevation: 35 m (115 ft)
- Lowest elevation: −2 m (−6.6 ft)

Population (2024 census)
  - Total: 122,187
  - Density: 2,172/km^{2} (5,626/sq mi)
  - Households: 29,688

Economy
  - Income class: 1st municipal income class
  - Poverty incidence: 11.59% (2023)
  - Revenue: ₱ 503 million (2024)
  - Assets: ₱ 1,481 million (2024)
  - Expenditure: ₱ 490.6 million (2024)
  - Liabilities: ₱ 704.6 million (2024)

Utilities
  - Electricity: Meralco
- Time zone: UTC+8 (PST)
- ZIP code: 3003
- PSGC: 0301407000
- IDD : area code: +63 (0)44
- Native languages: Tagalog; Kapampangan
- Feast date: June 24
- Catholic diocese: Diocese of Malolos
- Patron saint: John the Baptist
- Website: www.calumpit.gov.ph

Calumpit [kɐlʊmˈpit], officially the Municipality of Calumpit (Tagalog: Bayan ng Calumpit, Kapampangan: Balen ning Calumpit), is a municipality in the province of Bulacan, Philippines. According to the 2024 census, it has a population of 122,187 people.

== Etymology ==
The town is named for the kalumpít tree, a hardwood species similar to apalit or narra, which grows abundantly in front of Saint John the Baptist Parish Church in the Población-Sucol area.

== History ==
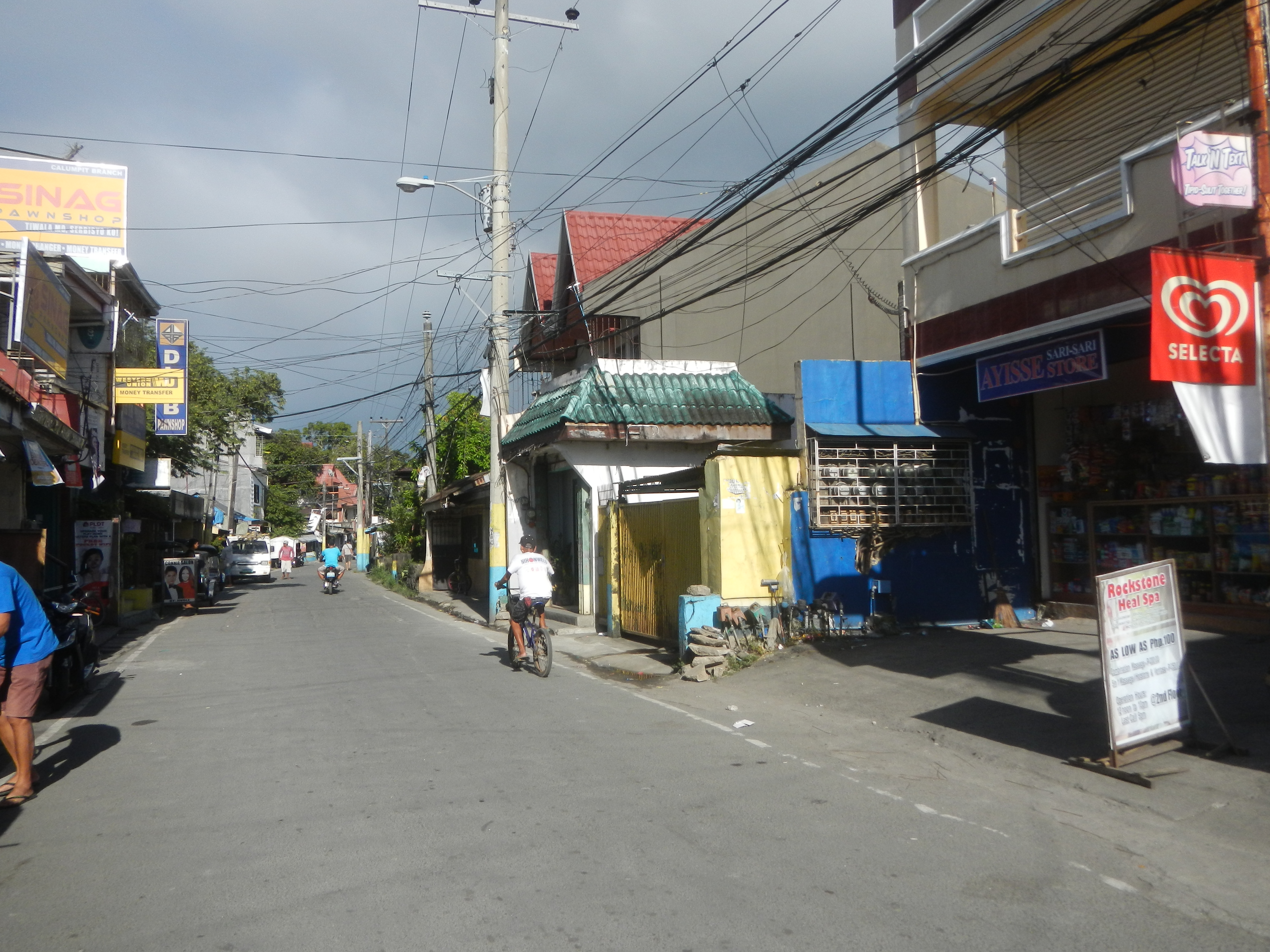
Calumpit Poblacion

=== Precolonial era ===
Calumpit was already an established barangay under the leadership of Gat Maitim prior to the Battle of Bangkusay and the fall of Tondo in June 1571. Nearby villages were Gatbuka, Meyto, Meysulao, Pandukot, Malolos, Macabebe, Hagonoy, and Apalit. When Calumpit was Hispanized and established as a Spanish geopolitical entity in 1572, they chose the site of the modern Barangay Población as the religious and administrative center of the aforementioned villages, which were annexed to it.

=== Spanish period ===
Upon hearing that Tondo was conquered by Martín de Goíti and Juan Salcedo, and that Rajah Matanda allied with the Spaniards in May 1571, Bambalito formed a fleet of two thousand natives mostly from Hagonoy and Macabebe. They sailed across Manila Bay to Tondo on 3 June 1571, facing Goíti and Salcedo in the historic Battle of Bangkusay. Bambalito and the natives were defeated, and the conquerors proceeded northwards to pacify other villages along the coast of Manila Bay.

In September 1571, Goíti and Salcedo, along with the invading forces, arrived at Lubao. On 14 November 1571, they reached Calumpit and Malolos and reported it to Miguel López de Legazpi, the first Spanish Governor-General of the Philippines. The two settlements were then constituted as the Encomienda de Calumpit and Encomienda de Malolos, respectively. The Encomienda de Calumpit was entrusted to Sargento Juan de Moron, one of the conquerors in the Legazpi Expedition.

==== Christianization ====
It is uncertain as to exactly when the Augustinians first set foot in Calumpit, but according to the documents, Calumpit was already a parish by 3 May 1572, when Fray Martín de Rada was elected Prior Provincial. Calumpit was simultaneously established with the conventos of Bay, Laguna, Tondo and Lubao, Pampanga, with De Rada as its prior and Fray Diego Vivar as his vicar.

Accounts state the Augustinian missionaries planted a wooden cross along the bank of the Meyto River to symbolise the baptism of the land, and built a chapel from nipa as thatching and bamboo. Later, they moved to Meysulao and built another visita, then to Panducot, where they built another chapel dedicated to Our Lady of the Visitation as Fray Gaspar de San Agustín mentioned in his Conquistas delas Isla Philipinas (Libro Segundo, Chapter 9). Subsequently, the mission headquarters was moved again to much higher ground where a huge and prominent tree called kalumpít (Terminalia macrocarpa decne) stood, as the locals had named the place. A notable feature is the site being bounded by rivers, which served as a natural, moat-like defence. Primarily, Meyto, Meysulao, Panducot and Calumpit was independent barangays under their chiefs, and likewise with Gatbuka, Bugyon and other old settlements.

On 5 April 1572, Legaspi merged the villages of Meyto, Meysulao, Panducot, Calumpit, Candaba, Apalit and Malolos, and these villages became ministerios and visitas as Calumpit, with present-day town itself as the center.

On 28 December 1575, Governor-General Francisco Sande annexed to the town the villages of Agonoy (now Hagonoy), Quinabalonan (now split between the barangays of Santa Monica and San Jose in Hagonoy), and some others along Macabebe River.

==== Early Spanish presence ====
When Calumpit was already subjugated by the Spanish, the Encomiendas of Calumpit and Malolos were unified under the administration of their respective, encomenderos Don Marcos de Herrera and Sargento Mayor Juan de Moron on 5 April 1572. A month later, Calumpit was created a hub for the Augustinian ministerio in Northern Luzon with the convento of Lubao in Pampanga, which included Betis and Bacolor, and the convento of Taál in Batangas, established on 3 May 1572, upon the election of Fray Martín de Rada as the new Prior Provincial of the Augustinians upon Fray Diego de Herrera being recalled to Mexico. The early parish of Calumpit included the old villages of Hagonoy, Apalit, Candaba, Malolos and Macabebe as its missions. The town first dedicated to Saint Nicholas of Tolentino, but in December 1576, it was re-dedicated to the patronage of Saint John the Baptist.

==== Province of Calumpit ====
On 28 December 1575, Governor-General Francisco de Sande established Calumpit as an alcaldía (province) independent of Bulacan, with Marcos de Arce as the first Alcalde Mayor, and encompassing the nearby visitas and settlements such as Malolos, Hagonoy, Macabebe, Apalit and Candaba. Later in 1576, jurisdiction of Macabebe was transferred to the town of Lubao and Candaba separated as a town, then on 11 June 1580, Malolos became a town transferred to alcaldía of Bulacan. In 1581, Hagonoy had its own convento but was still under the Governor of Calumpit, while in 1591 Apalit was officially separated as a town and to the reconfigured Pampanga province. In both Miguel de Loarca's 1581 document Relación de las Islas Filipinas and the June 1591 document of Governor-General Luis Pérez Dasmariñas, Calumpit appears as an alcaldía independent of Bulacan, Lubao, and Betis. It was therefore established both as an encomienda and alcaldía separate from Province of Bulacan, making it the first town in the area and a separate province.

==== Abolition ====
The alcaldia of Calumpit was eventually abolished, with and the towns of Calumpit and Hagonoy were annexed to Bulacan, while Apalit was annexed to Pampanga.

=== Philippine Revolution and Philippine-American War ===
During the Philippine Revolution in 1896, Calumpiteños participated in battles launched by the Katipunan against the Spanish Empire. Many notable Calumeteños helped establish and support the Malolos Republic, with the town serving as a defense line due to its proximity to the new capital. When the Philippine–American War erupted, Calumpit become the headquarters of General Antonio Luna in 1898. In the bloody encounters at Barrio Bagbag on 25 April 1899, many people joined the army of General Luna. During the conflict, the bridge, convent and church of the town were burned and completely destroyed.

Civil administration under the United States-led Insular Government was established in Calumpit in April 1901, with Juan Galang serving as the first elected American-era mayor of the town.

=== American occupation and World War II ===
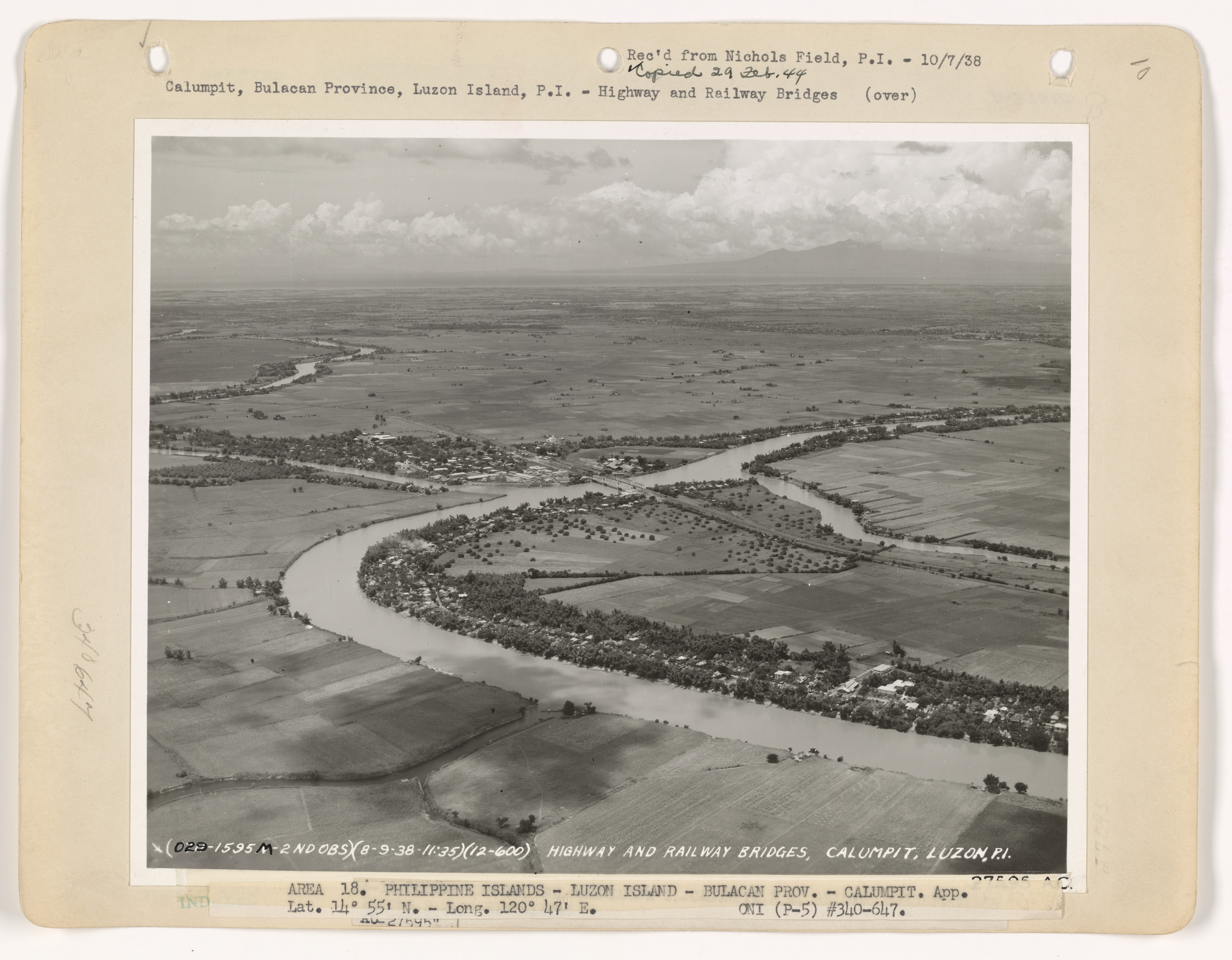
Aerial view of Calumpit, September 1938. The steel bridge destroyed early in the War is in the centre.

Calumpit played an important role at the outbreak of the Second World War in the Pacific theatre. The bridge of Calumpit on the way to Bataan was demolished by the Engineering Battalion of the United States Army, to impede movement of the Imperial Japanese forces. In January 1942, the Japanese entered Calumpit as they began their occupation of the Philippines for three years, during which many died.

In the middle of 1943, the first part of the USAFFE guerrilla was established under the leadership of Luis Macam, with most of the members from Calumpit.

In June 1944, the 4th Battalion of the Del Pilar Regiment was established under the leadership of Major Francisco del Rosario. They continued fighting until the returned of the USAFFE under the leadership of General Douglas MacArthur.

In January 1945, combined Filipino and American troops arrived in the town, liberating it from Japanese control.

=== Third republic ===
On 18 November 1959, former mayor Fausto Carlos was convicted for the murder of suspected Hukbalahap rebel Artemio Mutuc at the municipal building 11 years prior and was sentenced to life in prison.

=== Incidents ===
In 2011 when Typhoon Nesat or "Pedring" and Typhoon Nalgae or "Quiel" battered Central Luzon consecutively within two months, thousands of families in Calumpit and nearby towns experienced neckdeep floods due to the rains, bursting dikes and the release of water from dams that had reached critical levels.

== Geography ==
Calumpit is 50 kilometres (31 mi) from Manila and 5 kilometres (3.1 mi) from Malolos.

Calumpit is sprawled over an area of 5,625 has. of flat terrain classified accordingly to use for agricultural (66.81%), residential (10.42%), industrial (2.48%), commercial, (0.89%) and other (1.05%) purposes. It occupies around 2.06% of the total land area of Bulacan. The municipality has 144.33 kilometers of concrete roads that easily link its 29 barangays.

Two distinct seasons characterize the town's climate: rainy season which starts late May and ends around November; and dry season which begins November and lasts until April.

Calumpit has two types of soil – the silt loam which is found in almost 90% of the entire municipality and the clay loam in the south-east far end of the town. Both types are basically suited for agricultural purposes as per Department of Agriculture (Philippines) classifications.

=== Calumpit River ===
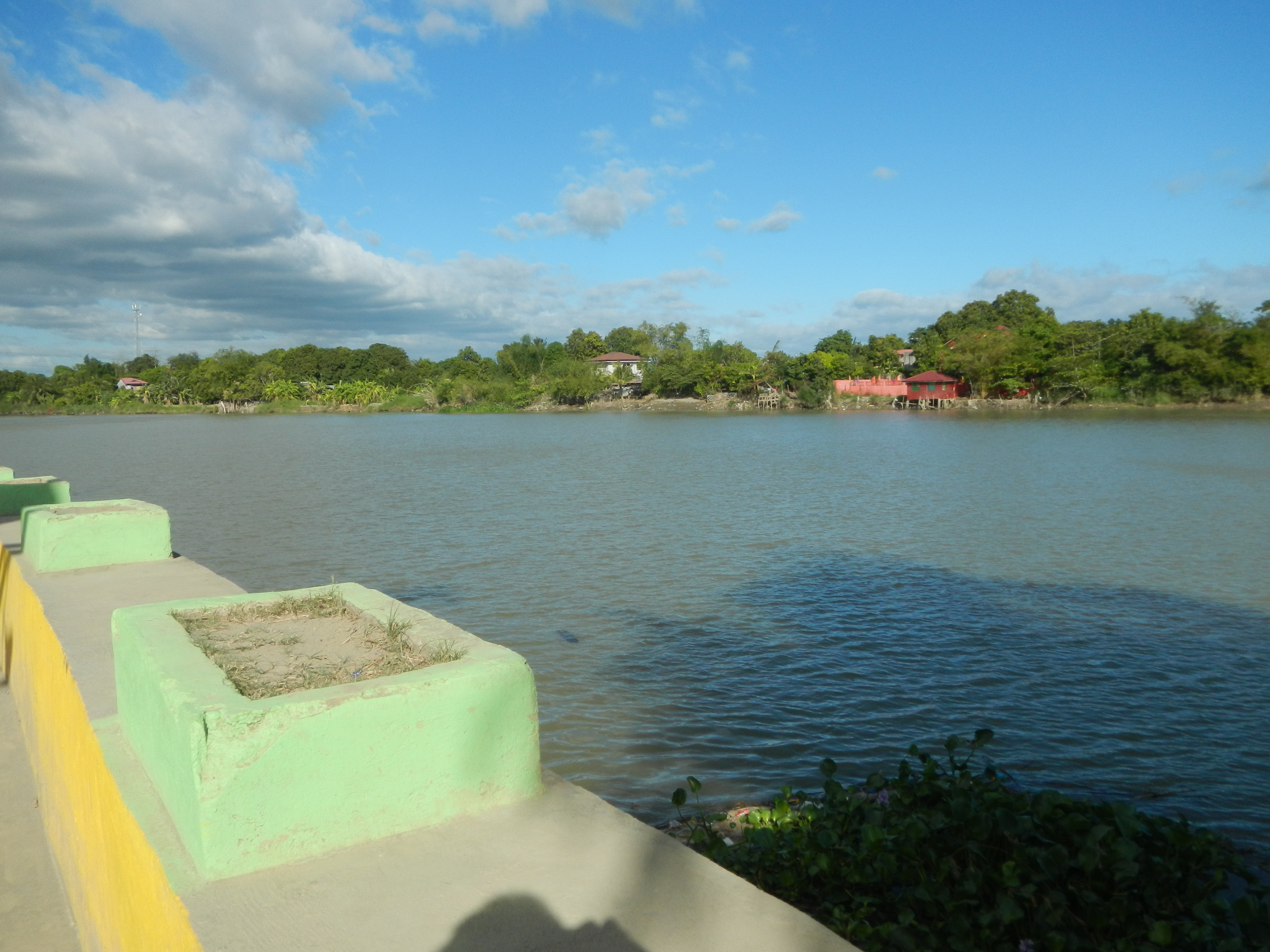
Calumpit River

The stretch of waterway where two great rivers traversing through Calumpit, the Angat River and the Pampanga River is referred to as the Calumpit River.

This river has shaped the lives of Bulakeños since time immemorial. With the longest river system in Bulacan, Calumpit River traverses the towns of Calumpit, Pulilan and Plaridel on the east, Paombong and Hagonoy in the West and winds up through Apalit, Macabebe and Masantol, Pampanga.

It was the major route for trade and commerce in this part of the Luzon prior to the arrival of Spain. The Pampanga and Quingua Rivers served as arteries through which goods coming in and going out of Calumpit passed. At present, the river is a valued resource as a rich fishing ground and providing farmers with irrigation.

=== Climate ===
The climate of Calumpit is similar to that of the rest of the other municipalities in the province of Bulacan. It is characterized by two (2) distinct seasons namely, the rainy and the dry. The rainy seasons starts from late May and ends around November, the dry season is from December to April. The average annual rainfall is 255.3 millimetres (10.05 in) with the month of August having the highest month average rainfall, about 304 millimetres (12.0 in). The annual number of rainy days is 175 days.

Climate data for Calumpit, Bulacan
Month	Jan	Feb	Mar	Apr	May	Jun	Jul	Aug	Sep	Oct	Nov	Dec	Year
Mean daily maximum °C (°F)	28 (82)	29 (84)	31 (88)	33 (91)	32 (90)	31 (88)	30 (86)	29 (84)	29 (84)	30 (86)	30 (86)	28 (82)	30 (86)
Mean daily minimum °C (°F)	20 (68)	20 (68)	21 (70)	22 (72)	24 (75)	24 (75)	24 (75)	24 (75)	24 (75)	23 (73)	22 (72)	21 (70)	22 (72)
Average precipitation mm (inches)	6 (0.2)	4 (0.2)	6 (0.2)	17 (0.7)	82 (3.2)	122 (4.8)	151 (5.9)	123 (4.8)	124 (4.9)	99 (3.9)	37 (1.5)	21 (0.8)	792 (31.1)
Average rainy days	3.3	2.5	11.7	6.6	17.7	22.2	25.2	23.7	23.2	17.9	9.2	5.2	168.4
Source: Meteoblue (Use with caution: this is modeled/calculated data, not measured locally.)

=== Barangays ===
Calumpit is politically subdivided into 29 barangays, as shown in the matrix below. Each barangay consists of puroks and some have sitios.

PSGC	Barangay	Population			±% p.a.	
		2024		2010		
031407001	Balite	2.6%	3,216	2,399	▴	2.05%
031407002	Balungao	4.1%	5,044	4,899	▴	0.20%
031407004	Buguion	2.7%	3,296	3,143	▴	0.33%
031407005	Bulusan	2.1%	2,564	2,330	▴	0.67%
031407006	Calizon	1.6%	1,999	1,926	▴	0.26%
031407007	Calumpang	3.4%	4,159	3,571	▴	1.06%
031407008	Caniogan	3.5%	4,278	3,955	▴	0.55%
031407009	Corazon	2.0%	2,458	2,529	▾	−0.20%
031407010	Frances	4.7%	5,770	5,535	▴	0.29%
031407011	Gatbuca	5.2%	6,332	5,914	▴	0.47%
031407012	Gugo	1.4%	1,770	1,581	▴	0.79%
031407013	Iba Este	2.3%	2,754	2,756	▾	−0.01%
031407014	Iba Oeste	10.1%	12,359	10,610	▴	1.06%
031407015	Longos	2.8%	3,444	3,070	▴	0.80%
031407016	Meysulao	3.4%	4,109	3,430	▴	1.26%
031407017	Meyto	2.4%	2,971	2,780	▴	0.46%
031407018	Palimbang	1.7%	2,117	2,146	▾	−0.09%
031407019	Panducot	2.0%	2,501	2,403	▴	0.28%
031407020	Pio Cruzcosa	3.5%	4,336	4,145	▴	0.31%
031407021	Poblacion	1.6%	1,909	2,044	▾	−0.47%
031407022	Pungo	6.8%	8,347	7,674	▴	0.58%
031407023	San Jose	4.4%	5,437	5,017	▴	0.56%
031407024	San Marcos	1.8%	2,255	2,166	▴	0.28%
031407025	San Miguel	4.1%	4,998	4,720	▴	0.40%
031407026	Santa Lucia	1.8%	2,206	2,391	▾	−0.56%
031407027	Santo Niño	1.6%	1,955	2,357	▾	−1.29%
031407028	Sapang Bayan	2.3%	2,762	2,454	▴	0.82%
031407029	Sergio Bayan	1.6%	1,967	1,713	▴	0.96%
031407030	Sucol	1.2%	1,444	1,410	▴	0.17%
	Total		122,187	101,068	▴	1.32%

== Demographics ==
Population census of Calumpit
Year	Pop.	±% p.a.
1903	13,897	—
1918	14,844	+0.44%
1939	17,047	+0.66%
1948	21,788	+2.76%
1960	27,662	+2.01%
1970	36,119	+2.70%
1975	41,041	+2.60%
1980	45,454	+2.06%
1990	59,042	+2.65%
1995	70,839	+3.47%
2000	81,113	+2.95%
2007	98,017	+2.65%
2010	101,068	+1.12%
2015	108,757	+1.41%
2020	118,471	+1.82%
2024	122,187	+0.74%
Source: Philippine Statistics Authority

In the 2020 census, the population of Calumpit was 118,471, with a density of 2,100 inhabitants per square kilometre or 5,400 inhabitants per square mile.

Calumpit's population was 101,068 in the Philippine Statistics Authority (NSO) 2010 census. Historically, its population grew at an average of 3.71% per annum.

The barangay with the largest population is Iba Oeste, with 10,610 residents, while the smallest is Sucol with 1,410 residents.

Calumpit has a relatively young population, with the age group 1–19 years old, constituting 46.01% of the total population. The rest consists mainly of the working group between the ages of 20 and 59 years old accounting for about 47.96% and the elderly comprising 6.02%.

In terms of sex distribution, males exceeded the number of females very slightly with a count of 35,710 and 35,087, respectively.

=== Language ===
Calumpit is a predominantly Tagalog-speaking town, with about 96.3% of its people being fluent speakers. Residents in the northernmost barangays (bordering Apalit) speak Kapampangan while a minority speak other Philippine languages.

=== Religion ===
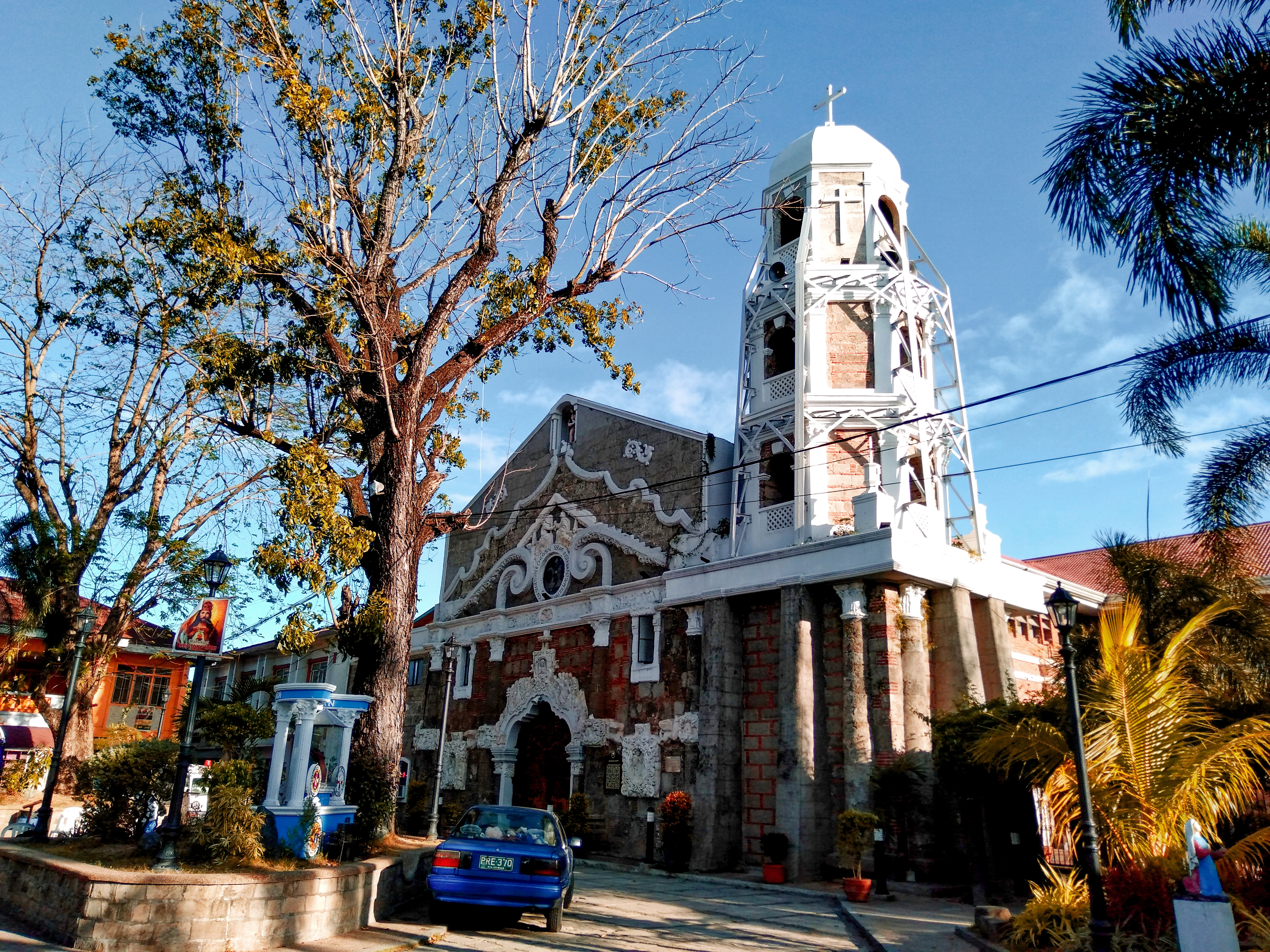
San Juan Bautista Parish Church

As Calumpit is the first town in Bulacan to have been Christianized by the Spaniards in 1572, about 80% of residents profess the Roman Catholic faith. Under the United States and because of the eventual disestablishment of the Catholic Church in the Philippines in 1902, Protestantism gained a foothold in the municipality. Significant religious minorities include the Iglesia ni Cristo, Members Church of God International, Iglesia Filipina Independiente.

Among the oldest churches in Bulacan found in Calumpit is the San Juan Bautista Church. Constructed under Augustinian friars Martín de Rada and Diego Vivar, it was initially made of nipa and bamboo and gradually built of stone in 1700. It enshrines the local patron saint, John the Baptist, whose liturgical birthday on 24 June is celebrated as the town fiesta.

Inside the church is a tunnel that, as legend would have it, was used by priests during the Spanish era as an escape route in the event of Chinese and Moro pirate attacks. It is a declared Diocesan Shrine of the Diocese of Malolos.

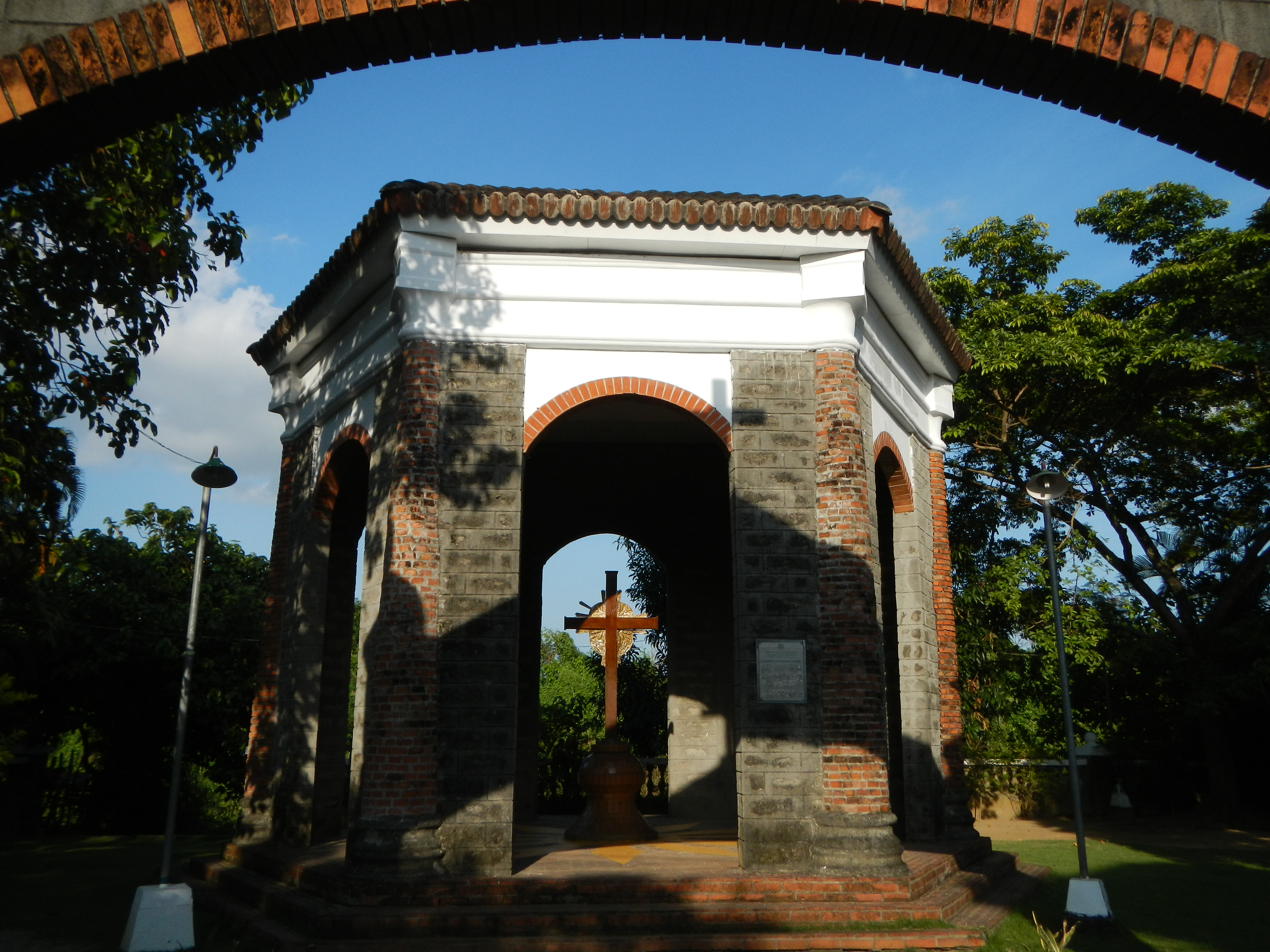
Meyto Shrine

The Meyto Shrine marks the cradle of Christianity in western Bulacan, where a wooden cross was first planted and first mass in the region was said in May 1572. The shrine, located in the western part of town, is also the site of the original church of Calumpit, predating the existing one in the town centre. During the Philippine Revolution, the Iglesia Filipina Independiente – which had by then separated from the Catholic Church – took over Meyto Shrine.

=== Labor and employment ===
In 1995, Calumpit had a relatively big labor force of 24,095 or 66% of the population aged 20–59. Around 35% of these skilled and were employed in their respective occupations; 28% were housewives with occasional employment as farmhands, selling farm produce in the market and doing marginal odd jobs. Others were unclassified and consisted mostly of students, out-of-school youth and the unemployed.

Total household income per annum is ₱705 million, with the annual average household income is ₱66,600 and per capita income annually is ₱12,198.

=== Literacy ===
The high literacy rate (98.5%) is maintained by its 24 elementary schools and six secondary or high schools. The Bulacan Manpower and Livelihood Training Center (BMLTC), based at the heart of the town, offers vocational courses and serves as the training ground for both unskilled and highly skilled workers. As a result, most Calumpiteños have acquired and maintained skills suited for employment especially in the agro-industrial field.

== Economy ==
Poverty incidence of Calumpit (%)

Source: Philippine Statistics Authority

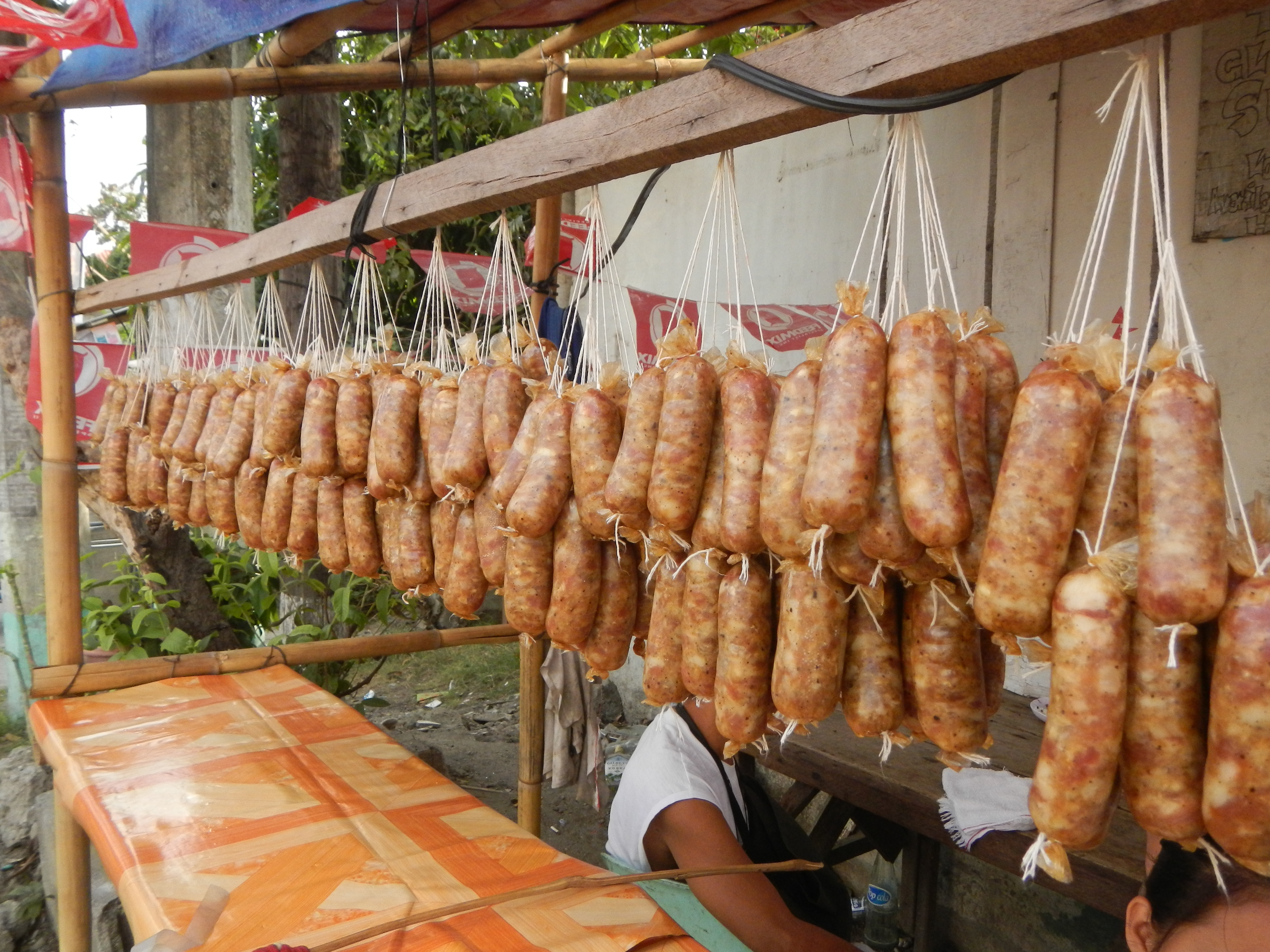
The renowned Longganisang Calumpit

Major industries

- Industrial estates
- Handicrafts
- Food processing
- Paper
- Garments
- Ceramics/pottery
- Flowers/ornamental plants
- Houseware

Major products

- Longganisang Calumpit
- Key chains, key holders, pen holders
- Company Uniforms
- Corporate giveaways

Industrial estates

- Bulacan Agro-Industrial Subdivision (Barangay Pio Cruzcosa)

Garments & Printing Services

- Imprentas Printing Services - Sitio Danga, Brgy. San Miguel
- Imprentas Clothing Company - Sitio Danga, Brgy. San Miguel
- Osano Garments - Sitio Danga, Brgy. San Miguel

== Tourism and culture ==
=== Festivals ===
Calumpit celebrates its town fiesta from June 23 to 24. The Libad is a river procession held every Saint John's Eve on June 23 to honour the town's patron saint. Calumpiteños sing, dance and douse water to "baptize" passers-by, recalling the saint's characteristic act. The ritual and its traditional route are relics of the old fluvial procession held when Apalit and Hagonoy were still governed from Calumpit. The festivities carry on to the next day, June 24, the feast of Saint John the Baptist.

Every June 23, a day before the feast, Calumpit's 29 barangays participate in the "Libad sa Ilog" fluvial float parade. Well-decorated pagodas pass along Calumpit River, the historic site of Battle of Calumpit from Barangays Gatbuca and Bagbag (Caniogan-Santo Niño) bridges passing Iba O Este along MacArthur Highway towards the San Juan Bautista Church.

One of the oldest barangays in the town, established in 1575, Santa Lucia is very popular and famous because of the supposedly miraculous image of its patroness, Saint Lucy. During the village festival, every December 12–13, the streets of the village are strung with colorful banderitas, as is the façade of Santa Lucia Church. Pilgrims visit the church for the two-day celebration, with the novena to the saint beginning on December 4.

==== Calumpit longganisa festival ====
On March 24–25, 2023, the town's 451st Founding Anniversary, Mayor Glorime M. Faustino led the 1st Calumpit longganisa Festival with a 514 meters "Longest Boodle Fight" along Pulilan Regional Road. 3,000 people who participated from Barangays Caniogan and Corazon ate the star "Longganisang Bawang" of Bikers Longganisa makers. Calumpit's 29 barangays residents joined the 500-meter longganisa boodle fight spread along the Calumpit-Pulilan Road, in its 2nd Longganisa Festival on 23 March 2024.

=== Bagbag Bridge ===
Bagbag Bridge was the site of the longest battle between the Americans and Filipinos led by General Gregorio del Pilar on April 25, 1899. The bridge is now a reminder of the valor displayed by the Filipino who triumphed against the American forces.

== Education ==
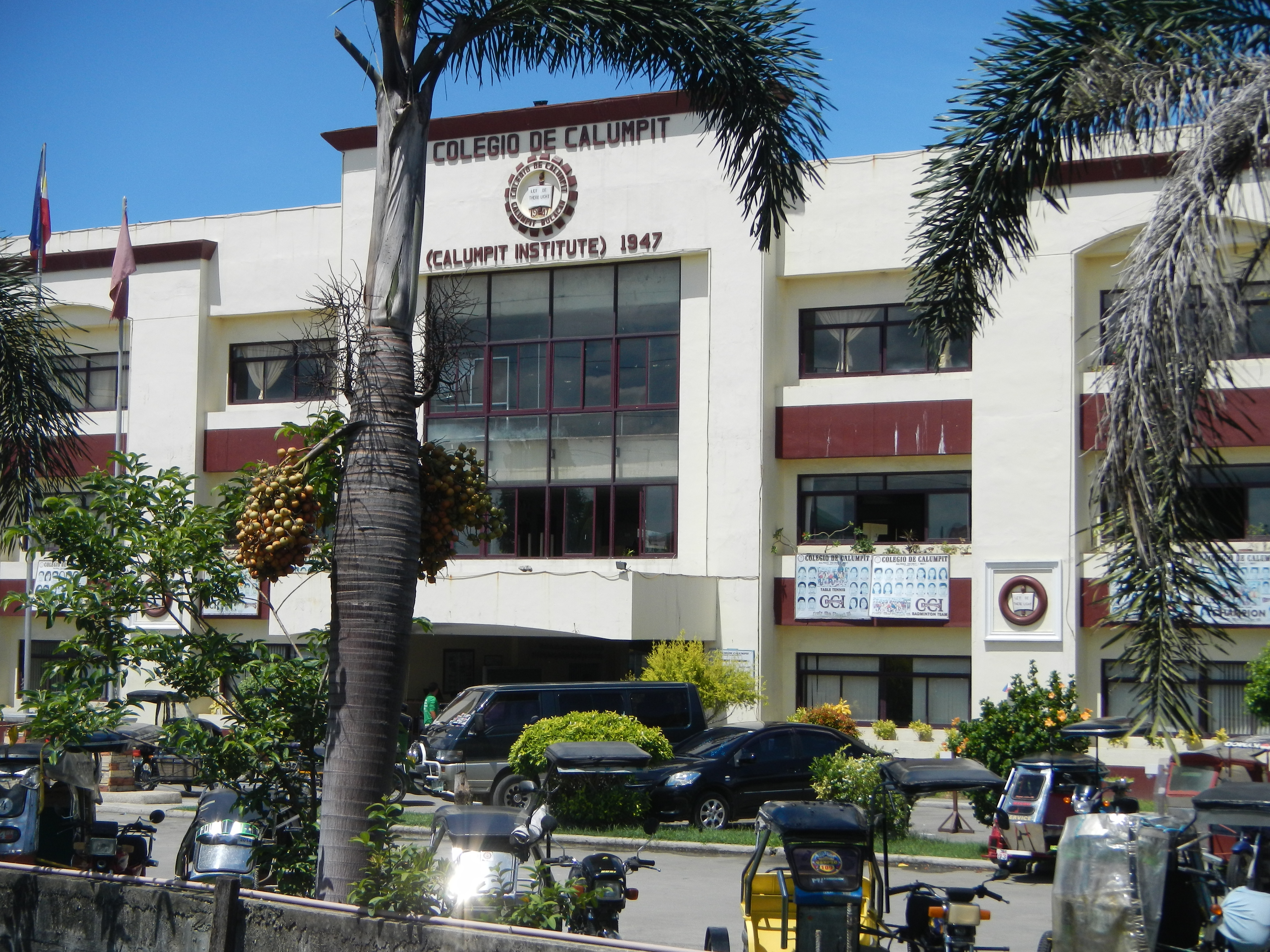
Colegio de Calumpit (formerly Calumpit Institute)

The Calumpit Schools District Office governs all educational institutions within the municipality. It oversees the management and operations of all private and public, from primary to secondary schools.

=== Primary and elementary schools ===
- Academia De Sto. Domingo of Calumpit
- Arsenio Santos Memorial Elementary School
- Balite Elementary School
- Bio-Kinetics Learning School
- Buguion Elementary School
- Bulusan Elementary School
- Calizon Elementary School
- Calumpang Elementary School
- Calumpit Central School
- Calumpit Central Ecumenical School
- Caniogan Elementary School
- Cherub Christian Learning Center
- Doña Damiana De Leon Macam Memorial Elementary School (San Miguel Elementary School)
- Ecclesiastical Christian Institute
- F. Mendoza Memorial Elementary School
- Frances Elementary School
- Good Spirit Integrated School
- Gugo Elementary School
- Hans Learning Center
- Harvesters' Missions International School
- Iba O' este Elementary School
- Juan Pagdanganan MS
- Linagit Primary School
- Longos Elementary School
- Meysulao Elementary School
- Meyto Elementary School
- Montessori de Enriquez School
- Northville 9 Elementary School
- Panducot Elementary School
- Pascual O. Cruz Memorial School
- Petras Christian School
- Pulo Primary School
- Pungo Elementary School
- Rabbi Vinirosa Academy
- San Jose Elementary School
- San Marcos Elementary School
- Shaldan's Learning Center
- Shalom Christian Academy of Bulacan
- St. Anthony Academy of Bulacan
- St. John the Baptist Catholic School
- Vicente T. Reyes Elementary School (Iba Este Elementary School)

=== Secondary schools ===
- Calumpit National High School (San Marcos National High School)
- Caniogan High School
- Colegio de Calumpit
- Frances National High School
- San Miguel-Meysulao High School
- Sta. Lucia National High School

== Notable personalities ==
- Servants of God Dionisia de Santa María Mitas Talangpaz (1691–1732) and Cecilia Rosa de Jesús Talangpaz (1693–1731): Sisters Dionisia and Cecilia Talangpas co-founded the Beaterio de San Sebastián. Their beatification process started in 1999, and they have both been deemed Servants of God while consideration for sainthood is in progress. Known for their exemplary lives of prayer, self-denial, service to the Church and apostolate that attracted young Filipinas.
- Gregorio Velasquez, National Scientist of the Philippines for Phycology
- Francisco O. Santos, National Scientist of the Philippines for Human Nutrition and Agricultural Chemistry
- José Zabala-Santos - one of the most popular cartoonists in the Philippines during the 1950s for characters such Popoye, Sianong Sano, and Lukas Malakas.
- Higino J. Fallorina Award-winning cinematographer. Tatlong Maria (1944), Baguio Cadets (1950)Maria Clara Awards, Roberta (1951), Sa isang sulyap mo Tita (1953), Jack and Jill (1954), Nagkita si kerubin at tulisang pugot (1954), Anino ni Bathala (1958), Merill's Marauders (1962), Iginuhit ng tadhana: The Ferdinand E. Marcos story (1965), Counter spy (1966), Pogi (1967), Ang mangliligpit (1968), Palanca (1969), Sonny side (1971), Dalawang mukha ng tagumpay (1973), Lalaki, kasalanan mo (1973), krimen: Kayo ang humatol (1974), Katawang lupa (1975), Bamboo trap (1975), Mababagsik na anghel (1975), Saan ka pupunta, Miss Lutgarda Nicolas? (1975), Anna Karenina: Babaeng hiwalay sa asawa (1976), Halik na lumalatay (1977), Ang babae sa ulog (1981)

== Gallery ==
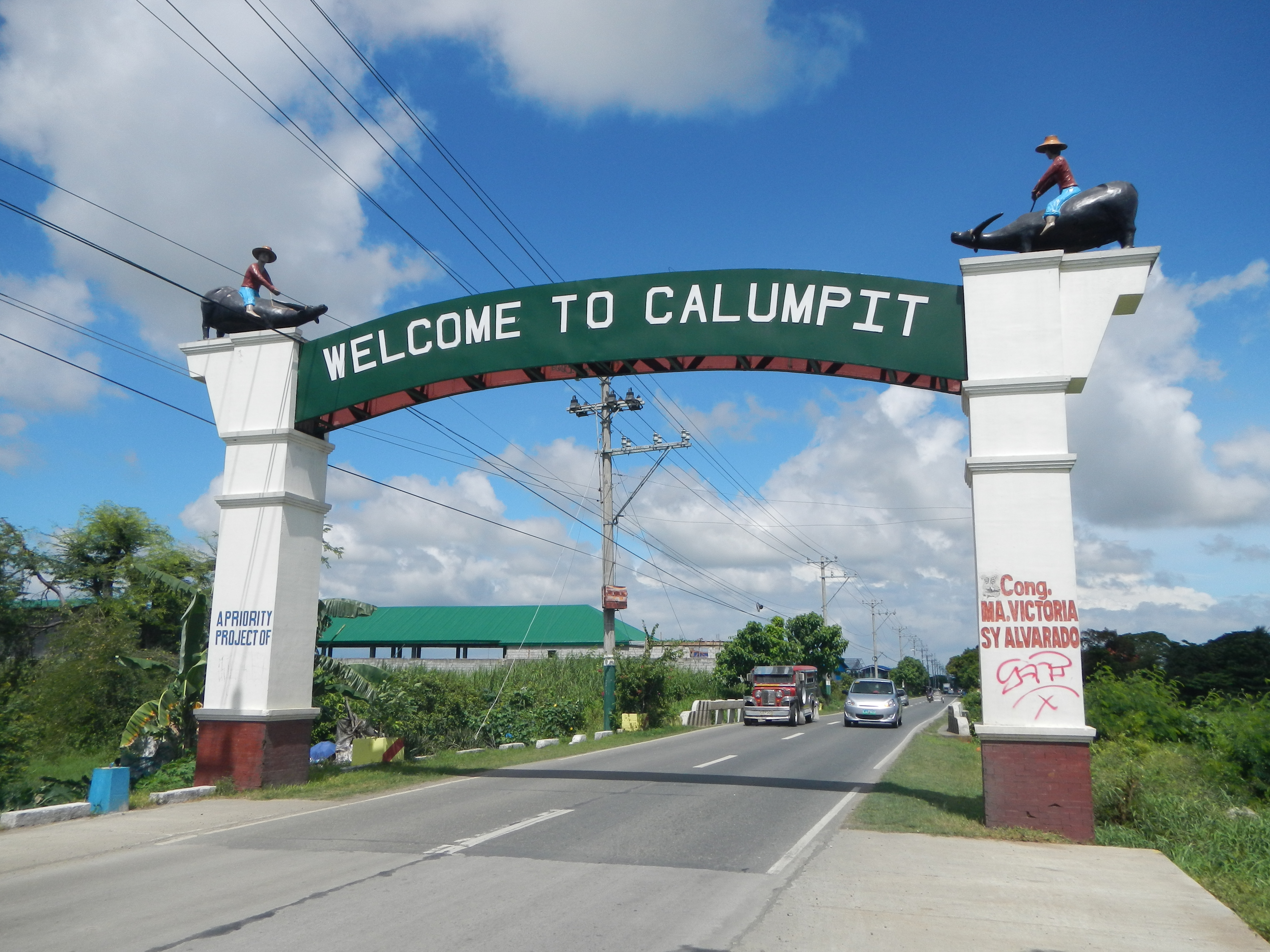
Calumpit Welcome Arch, viewed from the Calumpit-Pulilan Road

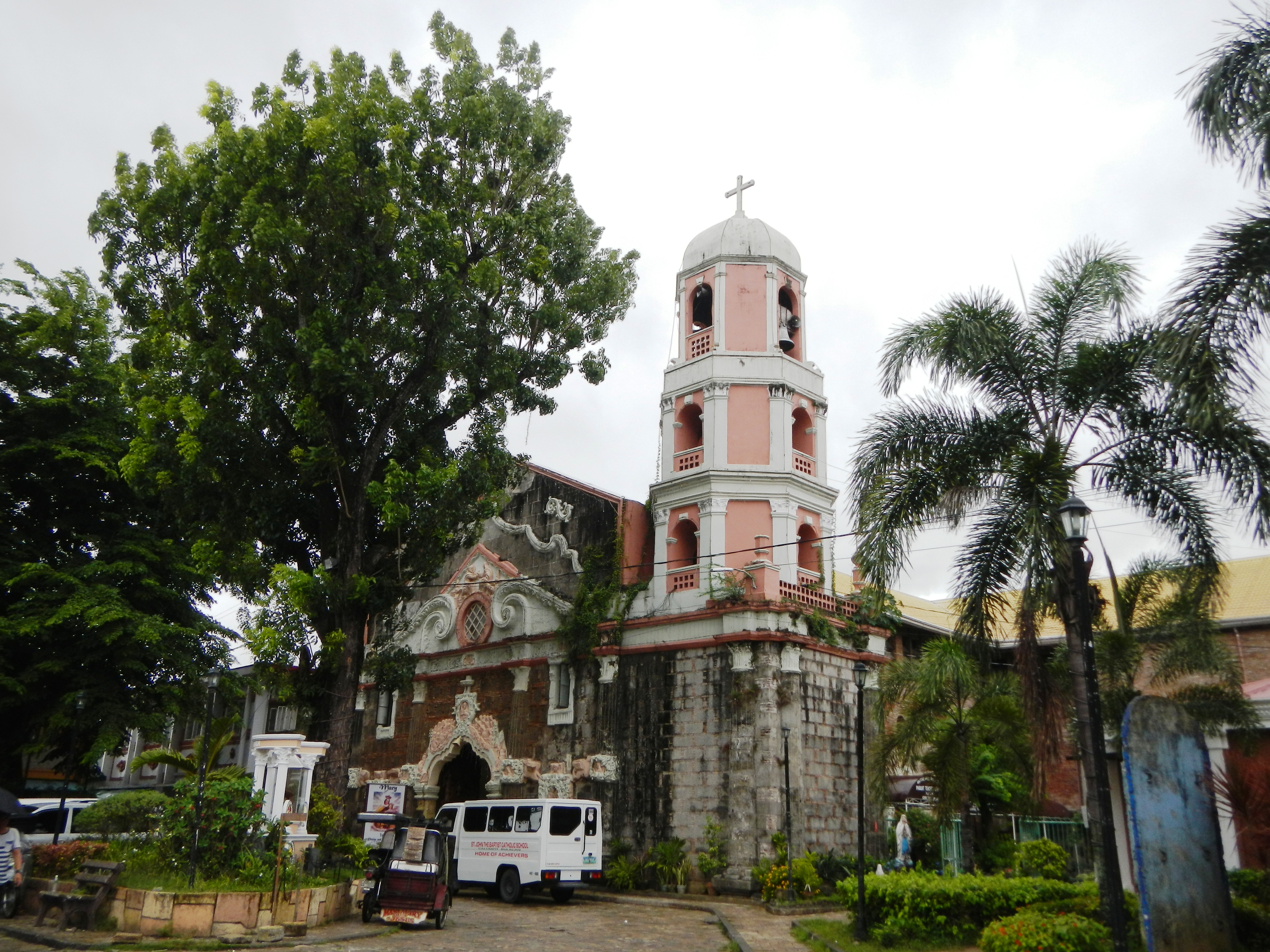
San Juan Bautista Church

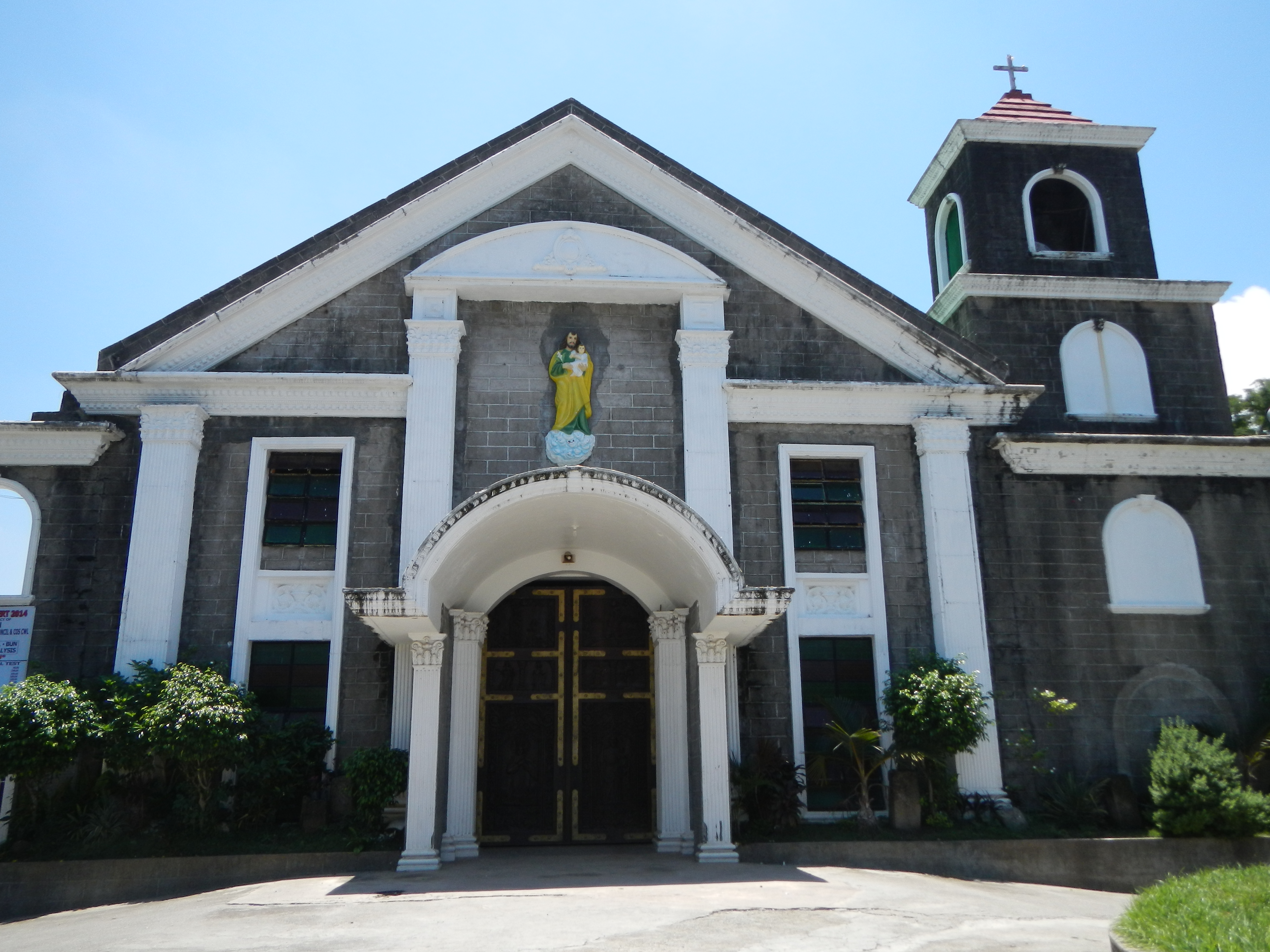
St. Joseph Parish Church

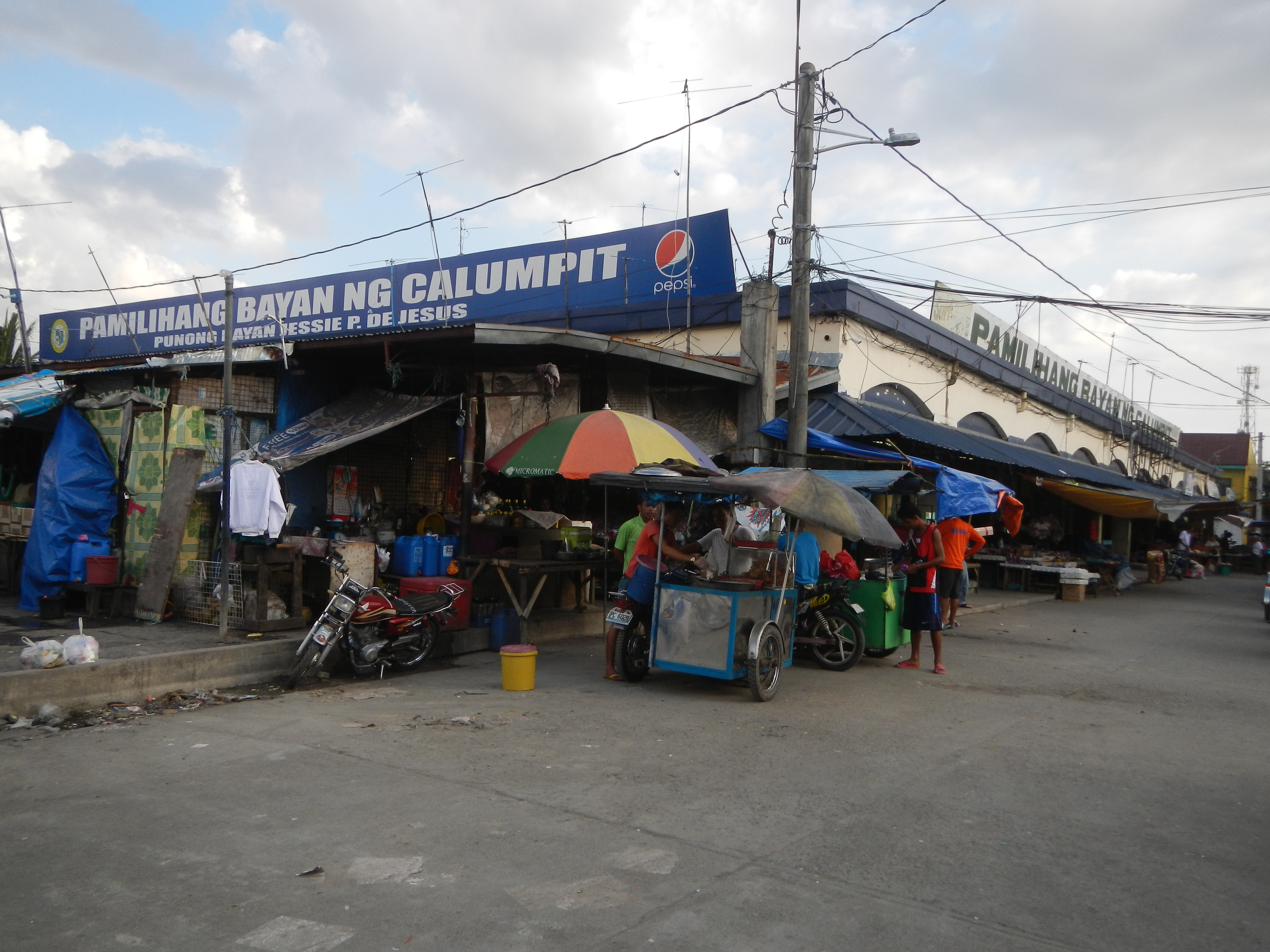
Calumpit Wet and Dry Public Market

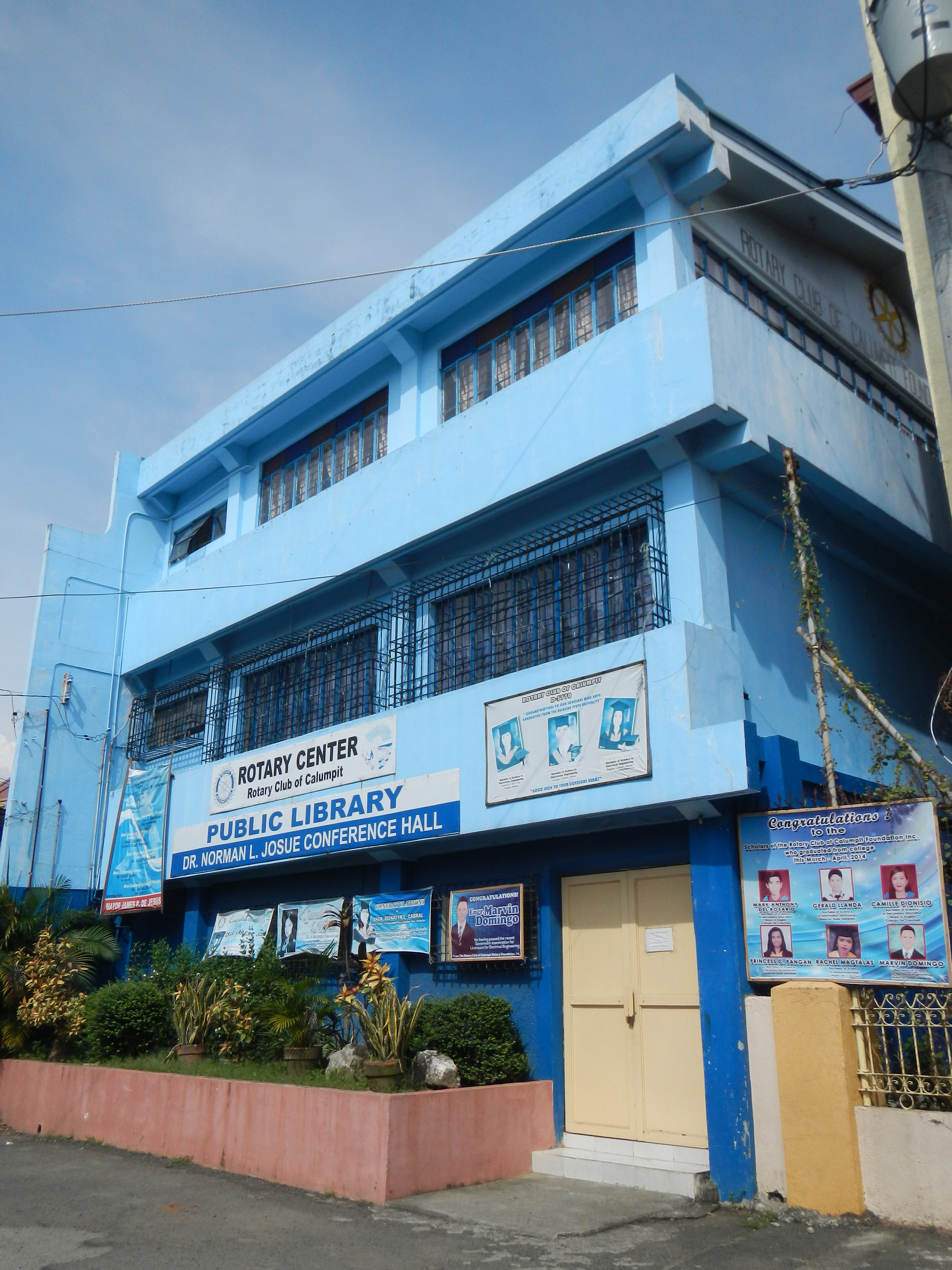
Rotary Club of Calumpit - Calumpit Public Library

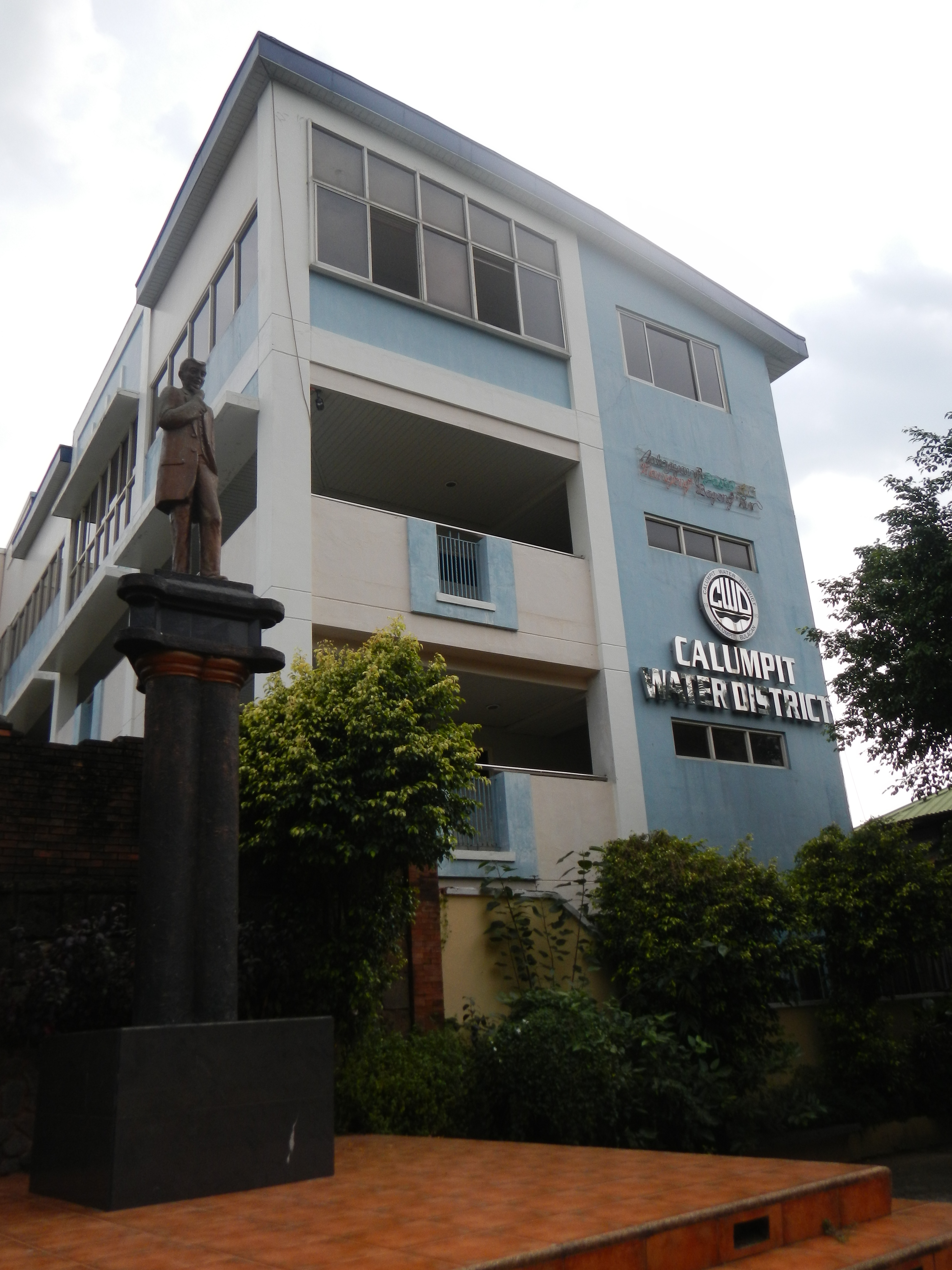
Calumpit Water District

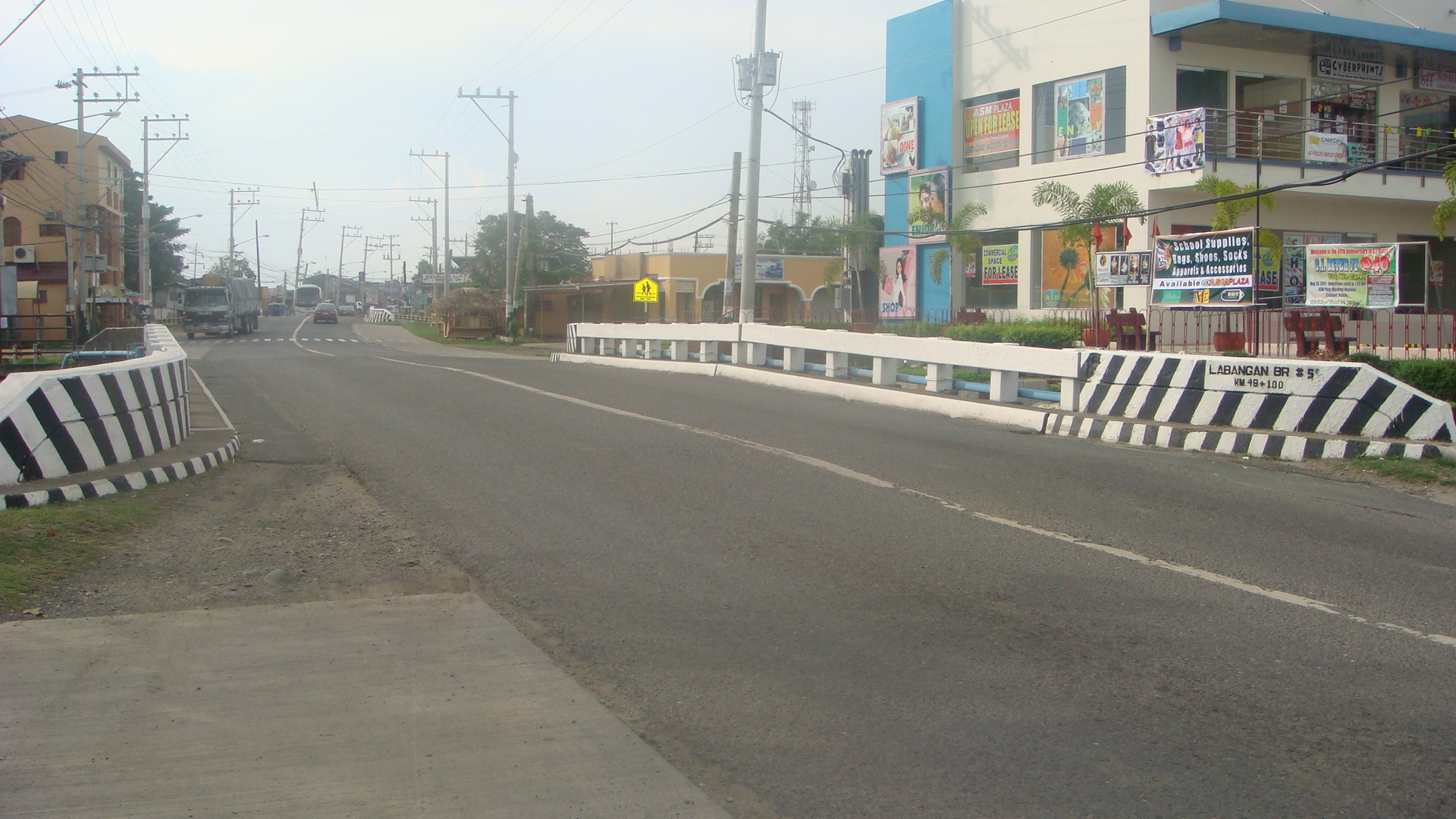
Labangan Bridge
