= Calumpit Church =

Roman Catholic church in Bulacan, Philippines

- Diocesan Shrine and Parish of Saint John the Baptist
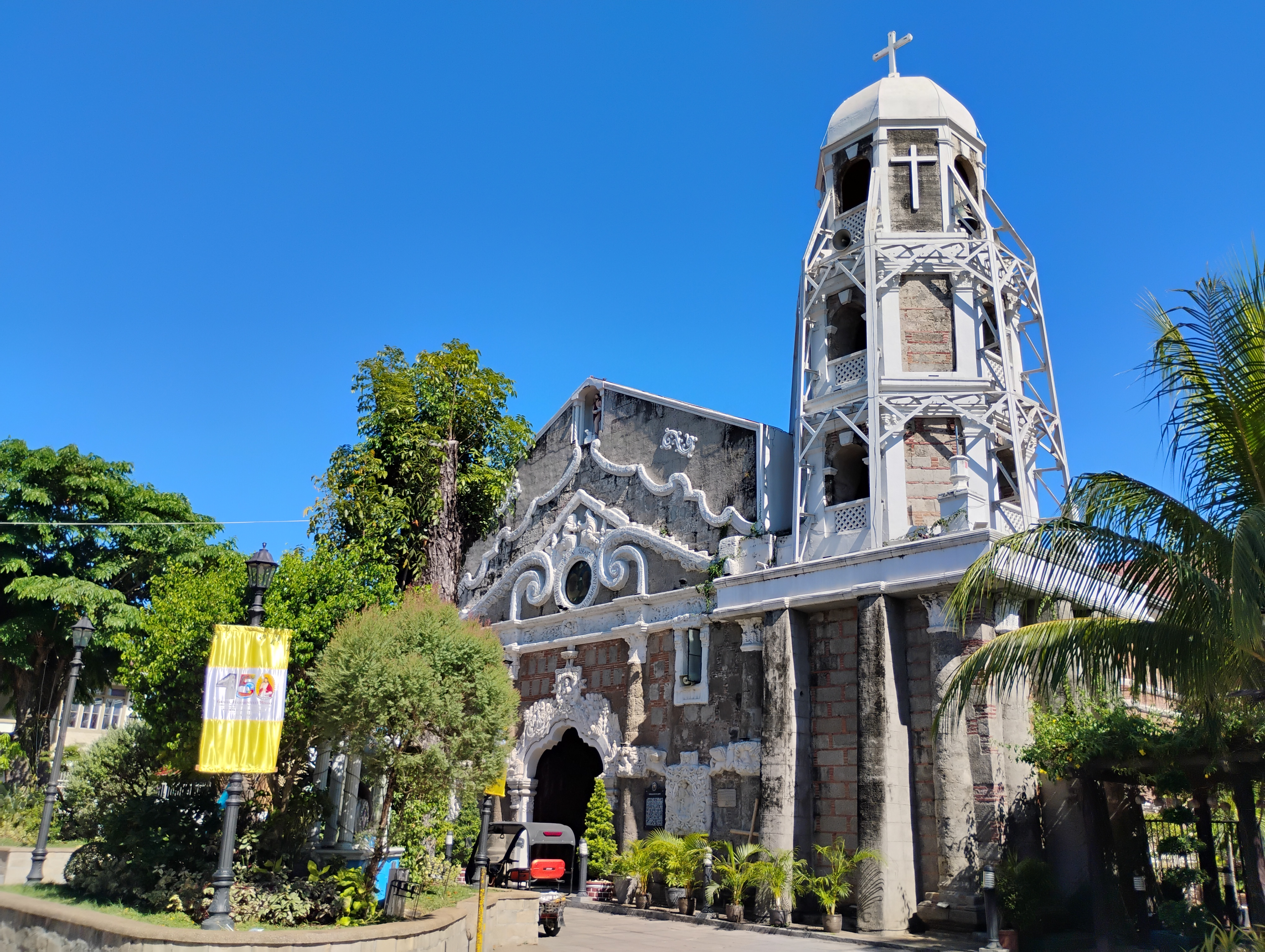
- Church northern façade and belfry in 2025

- Location in Bulacan Location in Luzon Location in the Philippines
- 14°54′58″N 120°46′08″E
- Location: Poblacion, Calumpit, Bulacan
- Country: Philippines
- Denomination: Roman Catholic

History
- Former names: Saint John the Baptist Parish Church; Iglesia de San Nicolás de Tolentino
- Status: Parish Church, Diocesan Shrine
- Founded: May 3, 1572;453 years ago
- Founders: Fray Martín de Rada OSA; Fray Diego de Herrera OSA; Fray Diego Vivar
- Dedication: Saint John the Baptist

Architecture
- Functional status: Active
- Architectural type: Church building
- Style: Baroque, Insipient Baroque
- Completed: 1779

Specifications
- Materials: Sand, gravel, cement, mortar, steel, brick

Administration
- District: Western District (Vicariate of Saint James the Apostle)
- Archdiocese: Manila
- Diocese: Malolos
- Parish: Saint John the Baptist Parish

Clergy
- Archbishop: José Fuerte Advíncula, Jr
- Bishop: Dennis Cabanada Villarojo

The Diocesan Shrine and Parish of Saint John the Baptist, also known as the San Juan Bautista Parish Church and commonly known as Calumpit Church, is a 17th-century, Roman Catholic, baroque church located in Calumpit, Bulacan, Philippines. The parish church, under the patronage of Saint John the Baptist, belongs to the Diocese of Malolos under the Vicariate of Saint James the Apostle.

== History ==
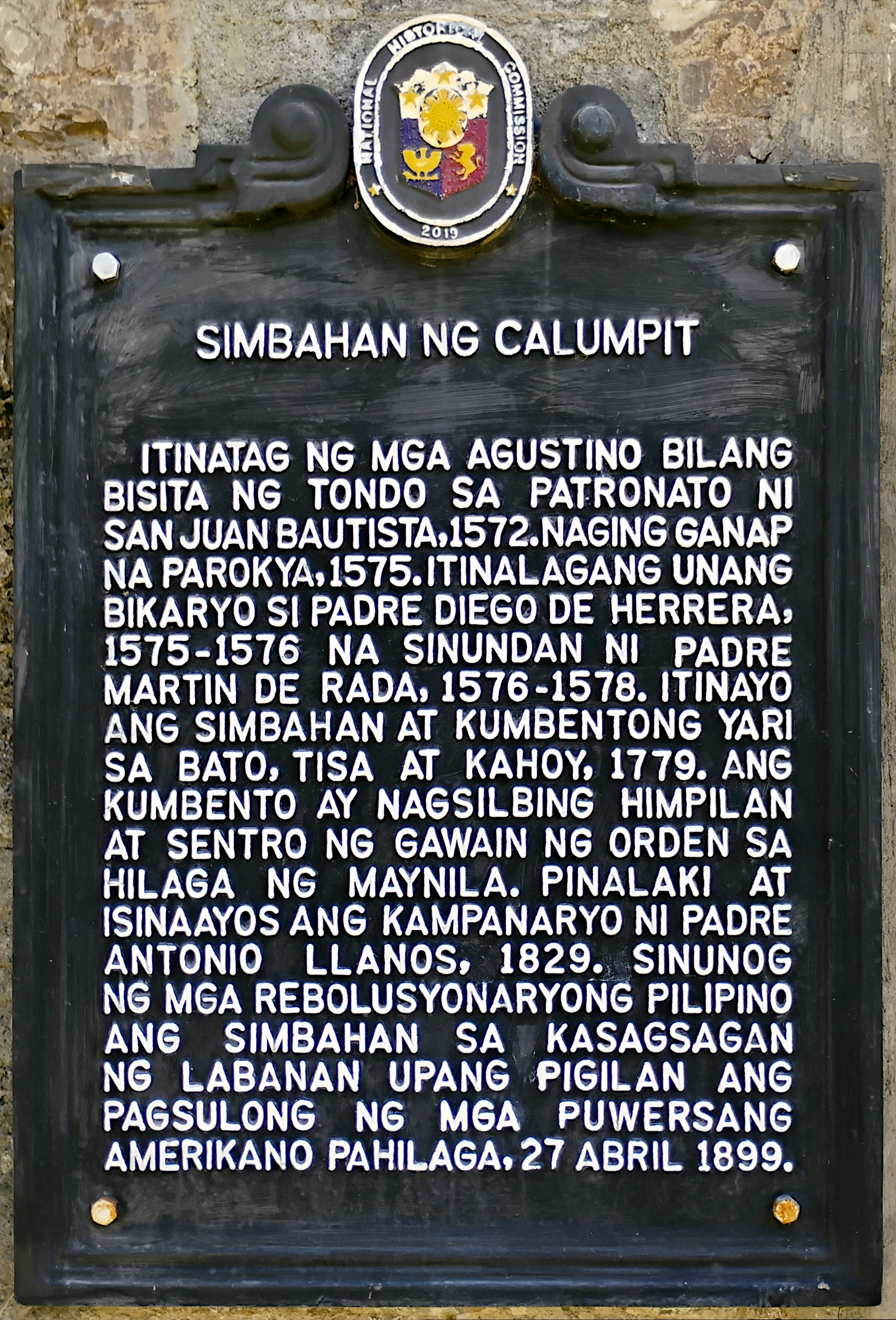
Church NHC historical marker installed in 2019

Calumpit is recognized as the first site of the evangelization by the Order of Saint Augustine in northern Luzon. The mission field covered the present-day Bulacan province and some areas of adjacent Pampanga such as the town's neighbour Apalit, Macabebe, and Candaba; some references cite Calumpit as part of Pampanga or as an Alcaldía of Región la Pampanga in the early years of Spanish rule, together with Betis and Lubao.

Calumpit was established as a prior on May 3, 1572, along with the churches of Lubao and Betis. On March 3, 1575, Fray Gaspar de San Agustín did not provide the town's first vicar. The convento of Calumpit was established on December 28 of the same year with the towns of Candaba and Macabebe annexed to it as its visitas. Its first titular patron is Saint Nicholas of Tolentine, but on December 31, 1576, its convento was referred to as La Casa de San Juan Bautista.

It has been recorded that Fray Martín de Rada with Fray Diego Vivar Ordóñez from Calumpit were the first to proselytise in Bulakan, Malolos, and Hagonoy. On June 11, 1580, Malolos was separated as convento, and Hagonoy on April 22, 1581.

In 1619, Paombong was ceded from its original mother town in which it was annexed to Calumpit in 1639, but on November 28, 1650, it was reunited with Malolos. Calumpit was by then a vital mission center due to its proximity to river systems that enabled transport for missionaries. Despite its important role in the Christianisation of Bulacan, reports show that its convento was once declared vacant due to a lack of priests.

== Architectural history ==
Extant references do not identify the priest responsible for constructing the present structures, although it is assumed that both buildings were completed in the mid-17th century. Other references say that Vivar-Ordóñez erected the current church. Father Joaquín Martínez de Zúñiga, the prior from 1794 to 1797, noted that at his time the small convento was made of cut stone and had a tiled roof. The convento was damaged by the merging of two great rivers in the area: the Río de Quingua (now Angat River) and the Río Grande de Pampanga. The belfry was reportedly “low and not well-shaped”. It was said that locals disliked the shape of the tower and urged numerous parish priests to alter it. Finally, Fray Antonio Llanos rebuilt the tower in 1829. The entire church complex was razed by fire in 1899 during the Philippine Revolution.

== Architecture ==
The church is smaller than those of Hagonoy and Malolos. The façade is an example of how local artisans experimented with various ornamentation to come up with a lavish, seemingly Mannerist style.

The façade is arranged simply, with four rounded columns with Corinthian capitals supporting the pediment, dividing the entire front into three segments. Floral motifs and scrolls abound on the façade and link the round columns before undulating back into the cornice. Reliefs featuring the lives of saints can be found of the lowest tier of the façade. The flamboyance of the trefoil arched main doorway is matched by the swaying motion of the original pediment, and the volutes framing a circular window. Besides the main doorway and the central window, the facade is pierced by a pair of rectangular windows framed by ornate reliefs.

To the right-hand of the church is the simple, four-tiered belfry that contrasts the profusely ornamented façade. Much renovation has been done to the church, one of which concerns the extension of the façade, transforming the original swaying motion of the pediment into the simple, triangular roofline seen today. In recent years, a new, heavily carved wooden door depicting scenes from the life of Saint John the Baptist was installed in the main doorway.

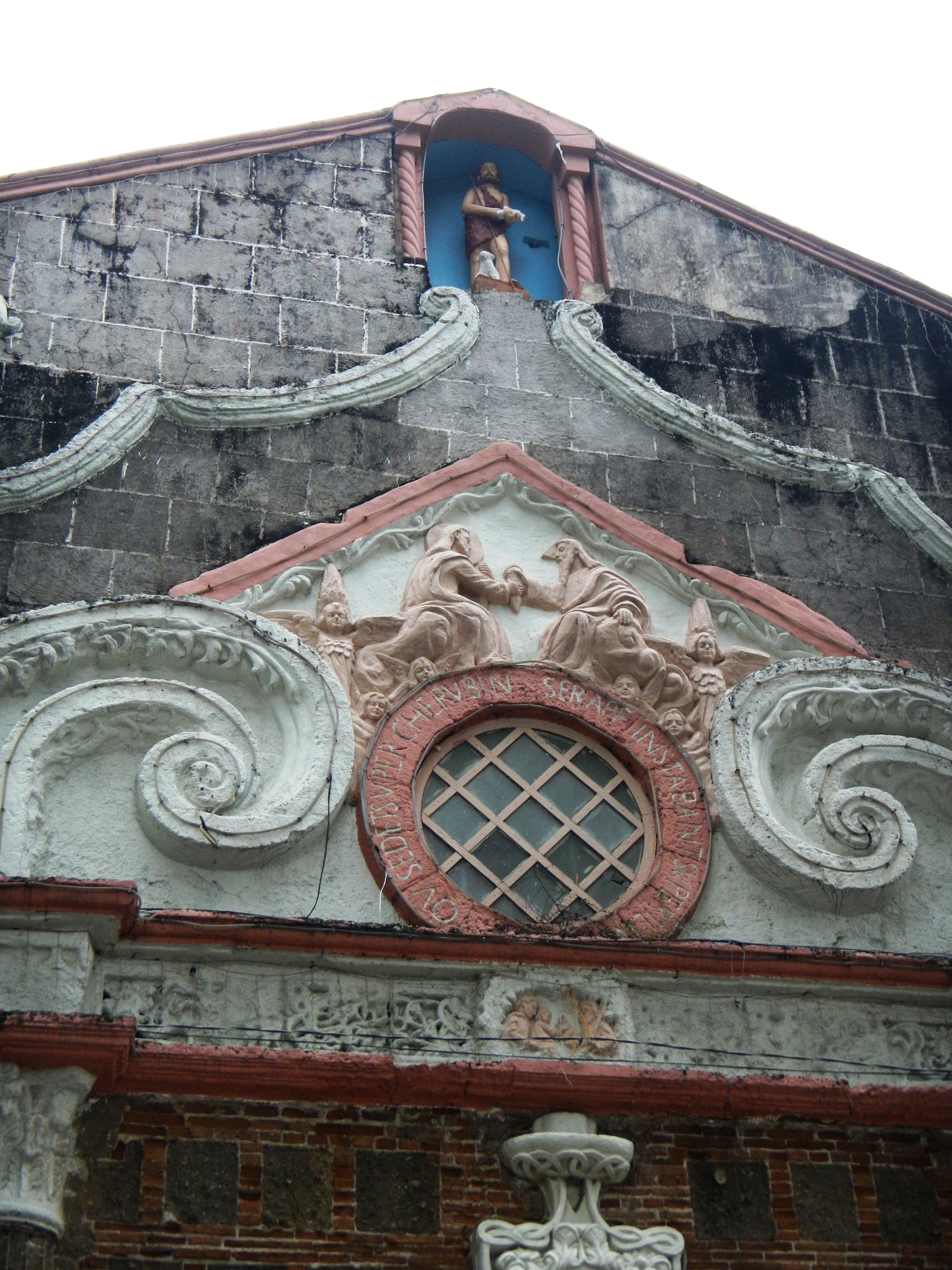
Details of window and pediment with a niche for a statue of Saint John the Baptist

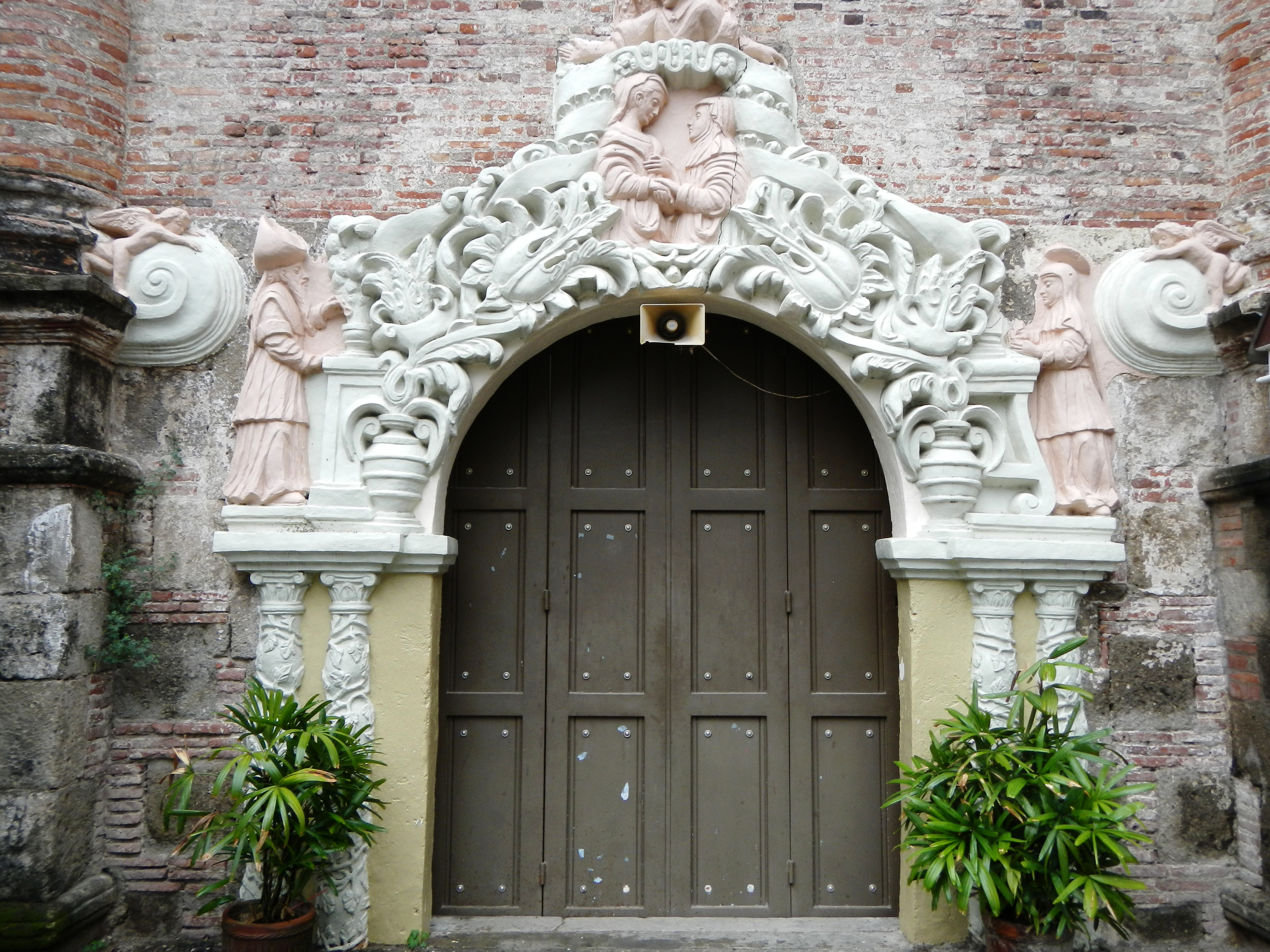
Ornate side portal, featuring pink reliefs of the Visitation at the top, and figures of Saint Zachary (vested as a kohen) and Saint Elizabeth to the sides

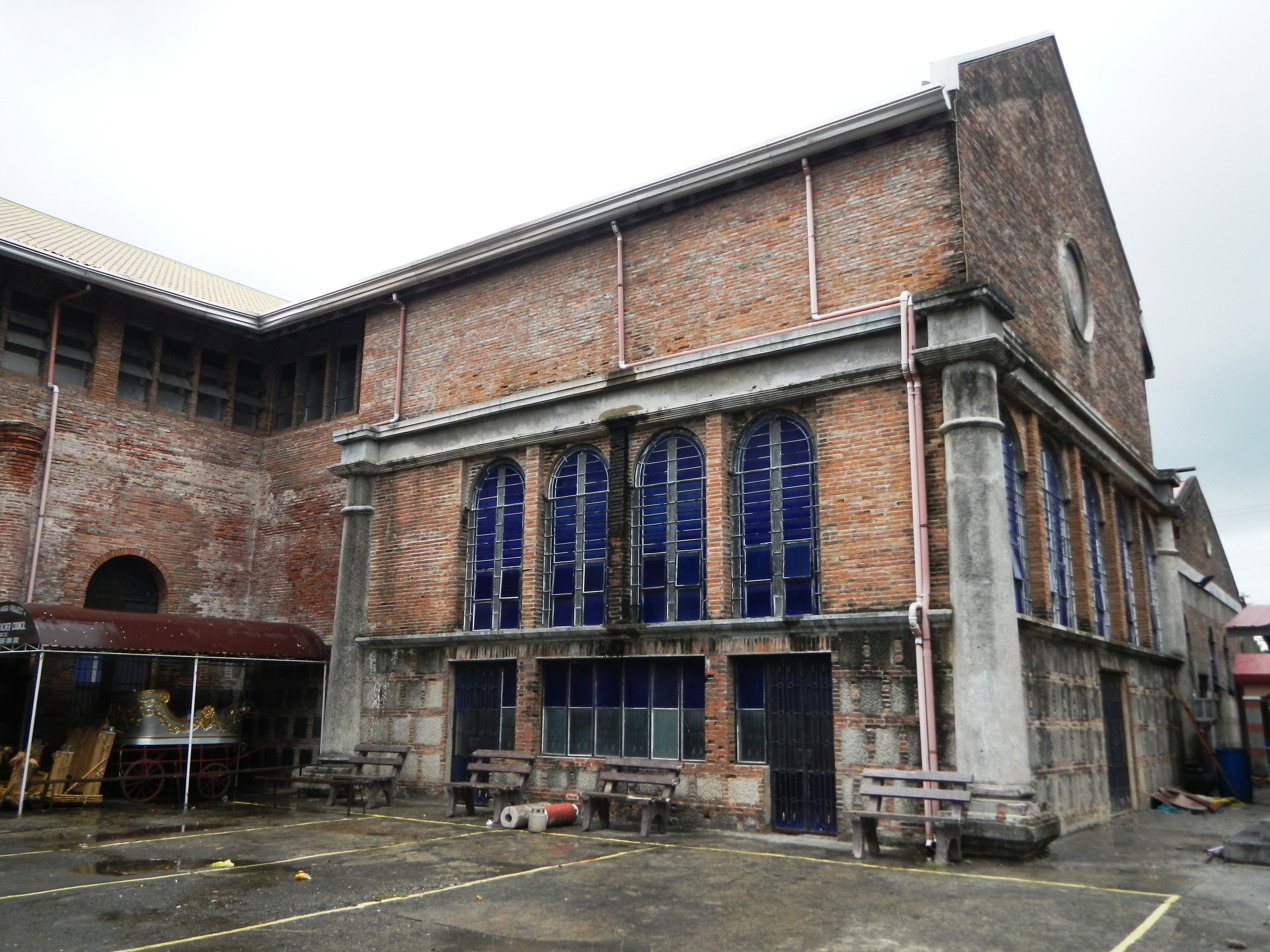
Transept on the epistle side

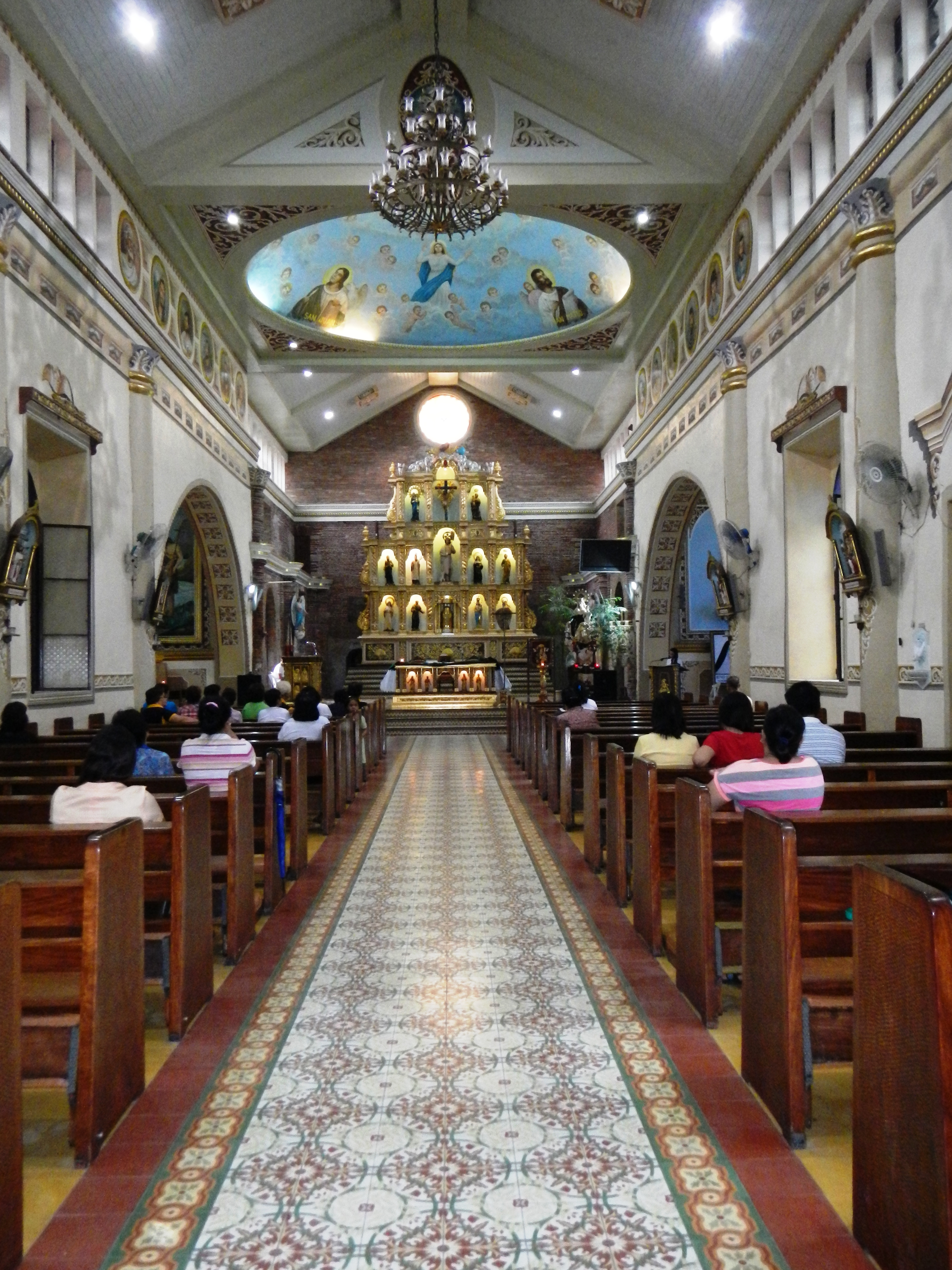
Church nave from the narthex

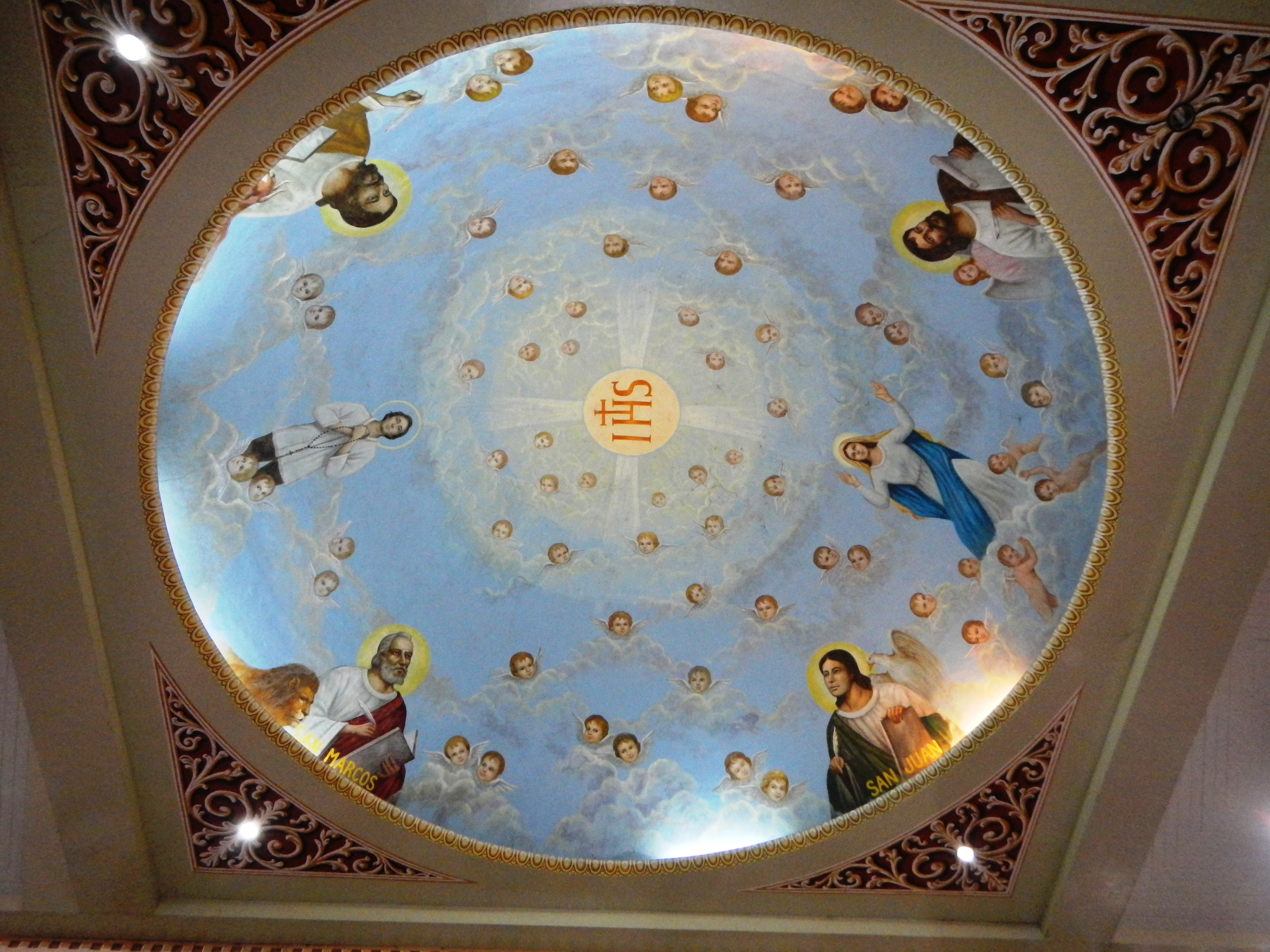
Church dome, with the Assumption, the Four Evangelists, and Saint Lorenzo Ruiz

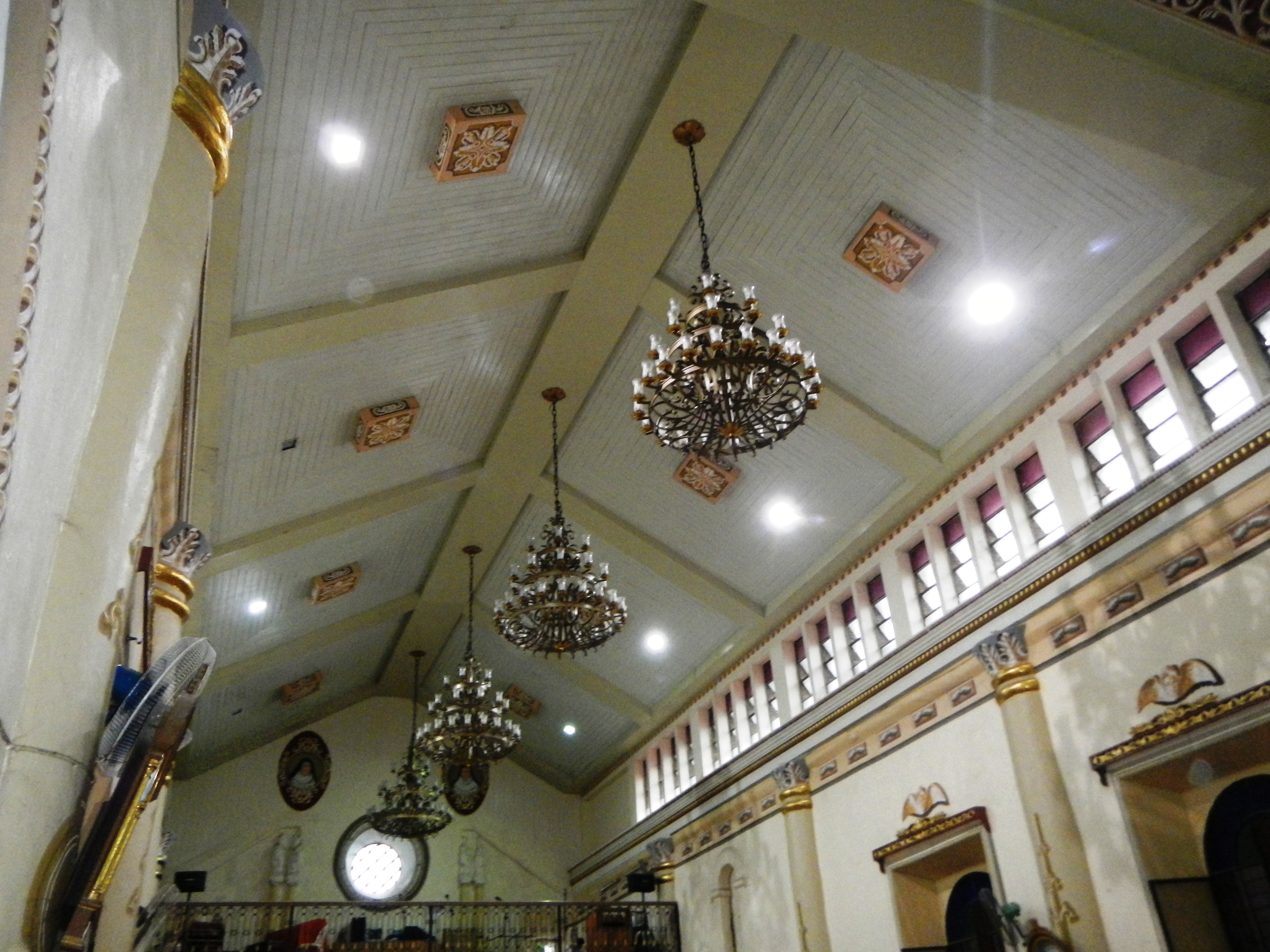
Wooden ceiling, the choir loft, and the clerestory

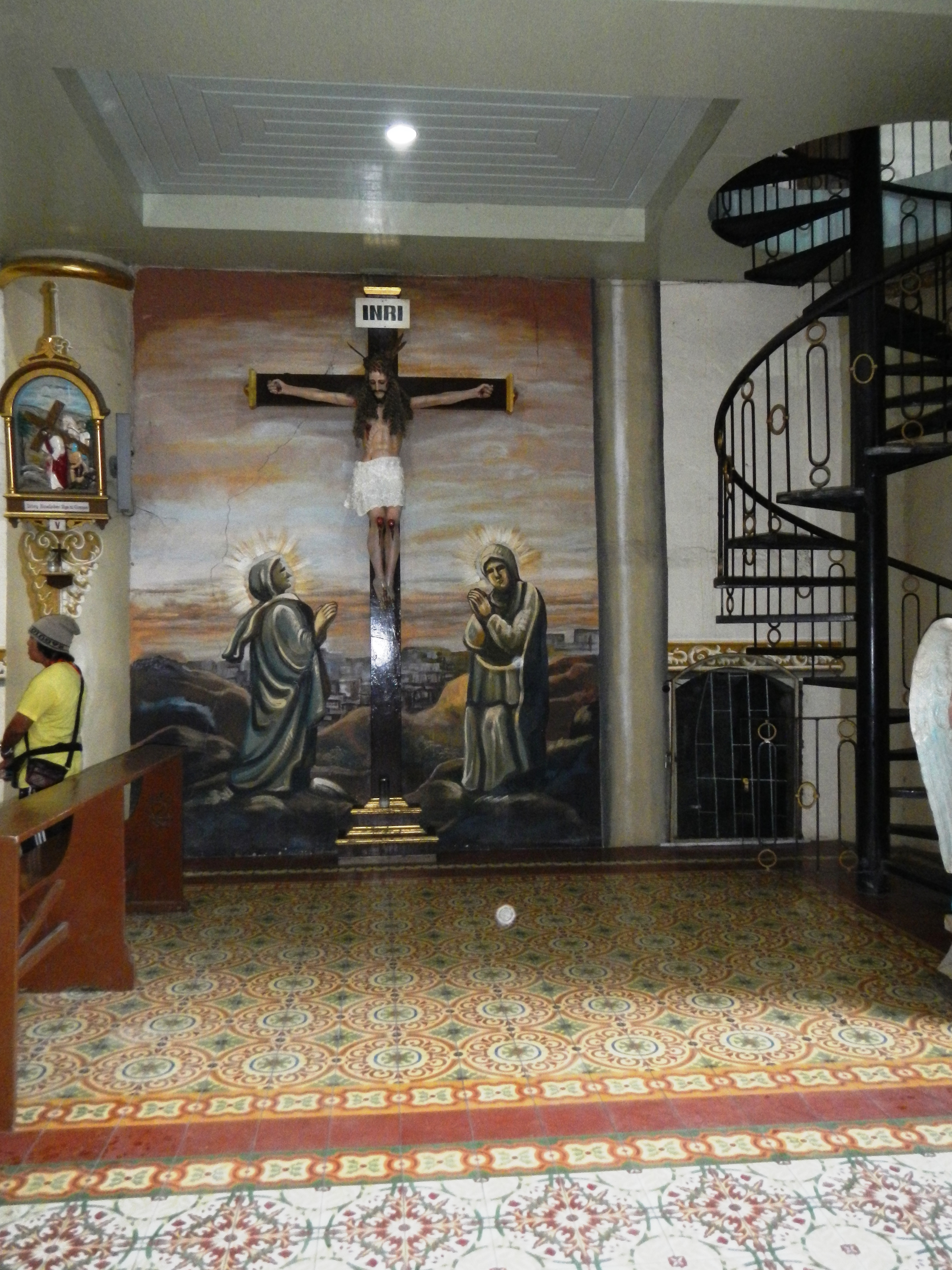
A Calvary tableau of a crucifix and frescoes of located in the narthex
