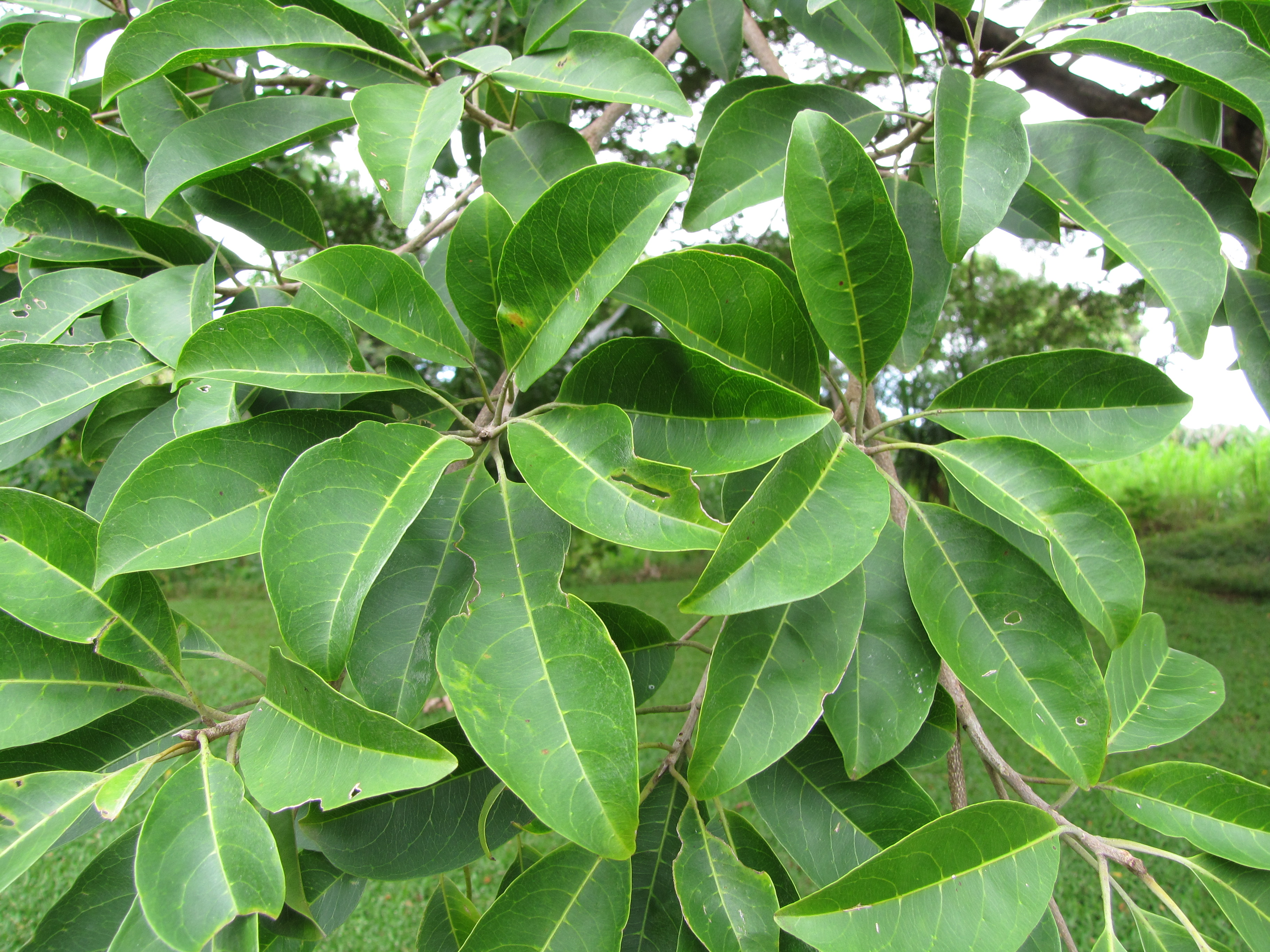
- Terminalia microcarpa in Hawaii
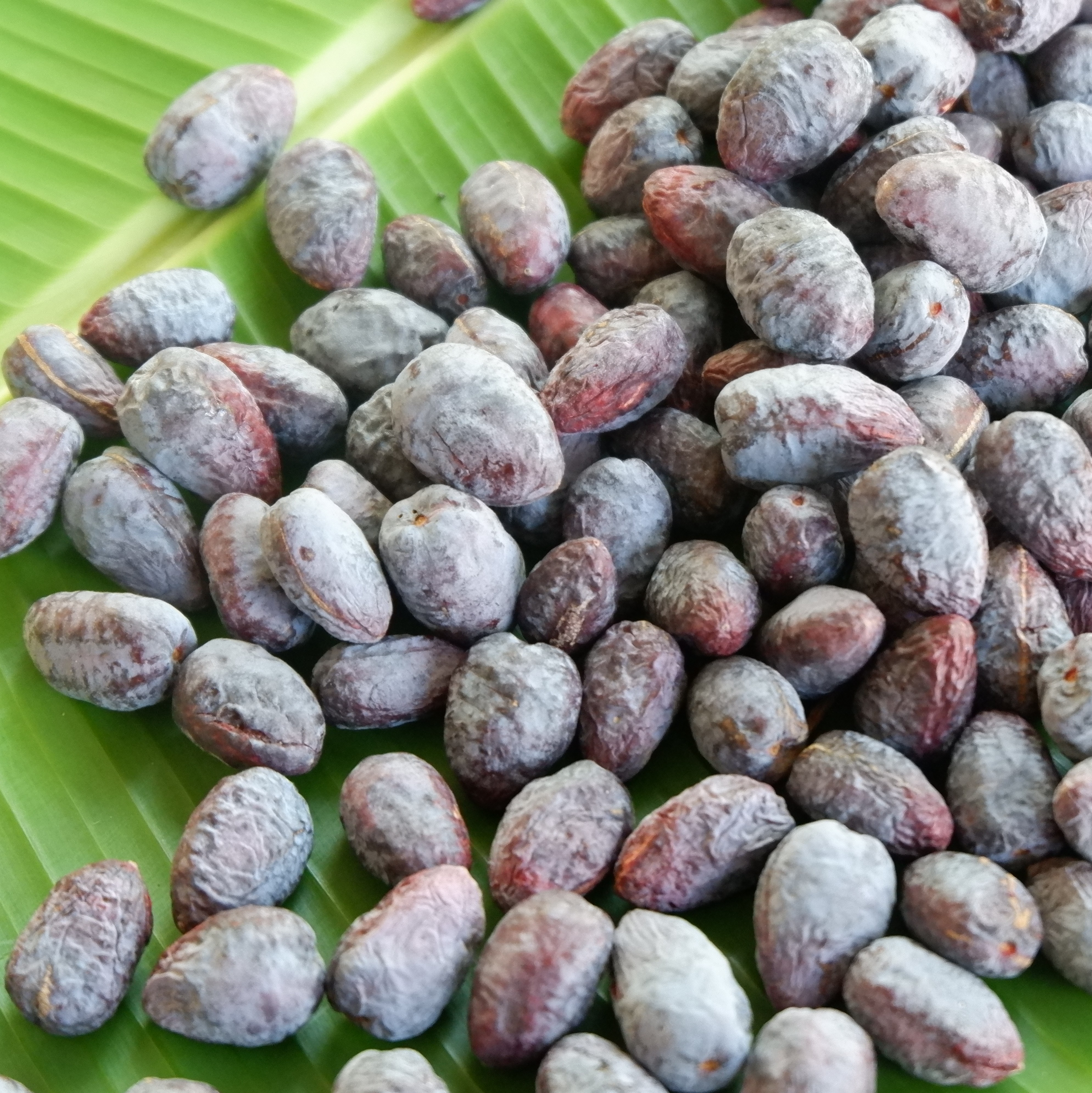
- Edible kalumpit fruits in the Philippines

Conservation status
- Least Concern (IUCN 3.1)

Scientific classification
- Kingdom: Plantae
- Clade: Tracheophytes
- Clade: Angiosperms
- Clade: Eudicots
- Clade: Rosids
- Order: Myrtales
- Family: Combretaceae
- Genus: Terminalia
- Species: T. microcarpa

Binomial name
- Terminalia microcarpa Decne.

Synonyms
- Terminalia sericocarpa F.Muell.

= Terminalia microcarpa =

Species of tree

Terminalia microcarpa is a tree species in the family Combretaceae. It occurs throughout the Philippines, in parts of Malaysia and Indonesia (Java, Sulawesi, Borneo, Timor, and the Maluku Islands), Papua New Guinea, possibly the Bismarck Archipelago, and northern Australia. It is cultivated on a small scale in the Philippines, where the edible sweet and tart plum-like fruits are eaten as is or are traditionally made into jams, jellies, and wines.

The species was formally described in 1834 by French botanist Joseph Decaisne. In the Australian Plant Census, Terminalia sericocarpa F.Muell. is regarded as a synonym of this species. Common names in Australia include bandicoot, sovereignwood, damson and damson plum. It is known as kalumpit in the Philippines.

The tree typically grows to a height of 12 to 30 metres (39 to 98 ft) in height and is deciduous. It blooms between September and October producing cream flowers.

It is found around springs and creeks and in rocky creek beds in the Kimberley region of Western Australia and extending across the top end of the Northern Territory and tropical areas of Queensland growing in sandy-loam-clay soils.

== See also ==
- Damson
