= San Nicolas Shoal =

Underwater sand and shoal area in Manila Bay, Philippines

- San Nicholas Shoal
- Interactive map of San Nicolas Shoal
- Location: Manila Bay, off the coast of Cavite, Philippines
- Coordinates: 14°26′07″N 120°46′03″E
- Type: Shoal; Sandbar
- Part of: Manila Bay

San Nicolas Shoal (also spelled San Nicholas Shoal) is a large shallow shoal and underwater marine sand deposit located in Manila Bay, off the northern coast of Cavite province in the Philippines. It spans the offshore waters of several coastal municipalities, including Rosario, Noveleta, Tanza, Naic, and Ternate.

Because of its shallow waters along major maritime approaches, the shoal serves as a key navigational hazard for commercial vessels entering the Port of Manila. In recent decades, it has also become the primary site for large-scale seabed quarrying and sand dredging in the Philippines to supply fill materials for major land reclamation projects across Manila Bay.

== Geography and geology ==
The shoal lies approximately 30 km (19 mi) southwest of Manila and stretches across the coastal shelf, 17 km (10.5 mi) south-southwest of Cavite. An offshore bathymetric feature within Manila Bay is the San Nicolas Shoal, a shallow seabed deposit spanning approximately 10,000 hectares off the coast of Cavite. Geological assessments by the Mines and Geosciences Bureau (MGB) classify these marine aggregates as heavy volcanic sands suitable as structural fill material for land reclamation projects along Metro Manila.

== Seabed quarrying and coastal activities ==
=== Commercial extraction and operations ===
The San Nicolas Shoal, a shallow marine sand deposit spanning over 8,530.22 hectares off the coast of Cavite, serves as the primary source of offshore fill materials for major infrastructure and land reclamation developments in Manila Bay. Offshore operations are authorized under the Government Seabed Quarry Permits (GSQP) issued by the MGB.

The process of the extraction primarily uses trailer suction hopper dredgers (TSHD), grab dredgers, and bottom-dump barges to pump sediment, volcanic sand, and silt from depths ranging between 3 to 35 meters. Multiple concessionaires operate within the shoal, including VIL Mines, Inc. and Silverquest Mining Resources, Inc., which transport dredged material directly to major land expansion sites.

=== Impact and local disputes ===
The expansion of offshore dredging on the shoal has led to conflicts with local fishing communities in the coastal municipalities of Ternate, Naic, Tanza, and Rosario. Fisher groups such as Pamalakaya and local fisherfolk reported significant declines in daily fish catches, attributing the drop to underwater noise, habitat disruption, and altered navigational channels caused by dredging vessels. They also have repeatedly called on the Bureau of Fisheries and Aquatic Resources (BFAR) and local government units to conduct independent assessments on the long-term impact of quarrying on marine biodiversity.

In response, private developers and national government agencies implemented financial aid and social support programs for affected workers. San Miguel Corporation distributed ₱500 million in financial assistance and livelihood support to over 5,000 fisherfolk in Cavite during the dredging phase for the Bulacan airport project. Also, the Philippine Reclamation Authority (PRA), rolled out community assistance programs and alternative livelihood projects for coastal communities in municipalities which have a coast with the shoal.
