= Pamalakaya =

- Pambansang Lakas ng Kilusang Mamamalakaya ng Pilipinas
- Formation: December 7, 1987
- Headquarters: Quezon City
- Chairperson: Fernando Hicap
- Vice Chairperson: Ronnel Arambulo
- Affiliations: Bagong Alyansang Makabayan, World Forum of Fisher People (WFFP), International League of Peoples' Struggle (ILPS), Asian Peasant Coalition (APC), International Fisherfolk and FishWorkers’ Coalition (IFWC)
- Website: pamalakayaweb.wordpress.com

The Pambansang Lakas ng Kilusang Mamamalakaya ng Pilipinas (National Strength of Fisherfolk Movement of the Philippines) or Pamalakaya is a national federation of small-scale fisherfolk organizations in the Philippines. The group advocates for the betterment of small fisherfolk and their communities in the country against unfair treatment by large-scale, commercial fishing, as well as other issues that concern coastal communities such as reclamation, climate change, urban development, demolitions, and aggressions by countries it claims as imperialist, such as the United States and China.

Pamalakaya is affiliated with the Bagong Alyansang Makabayan (BAYAN), a coalition of progressive organizations.

== History ==
Pamalakaya was established on December 7, 1987.

Ronnel Arambulo, the organization's vice chairperson since 2023, ran for Senate during the 2025 Philippine national elections under the Makabayan Bloc, advocating for the rights of fisherfolk as well as against intrusions by China.

== Advocacies ==
=== Pro-small-scale fisherfolk stances ===
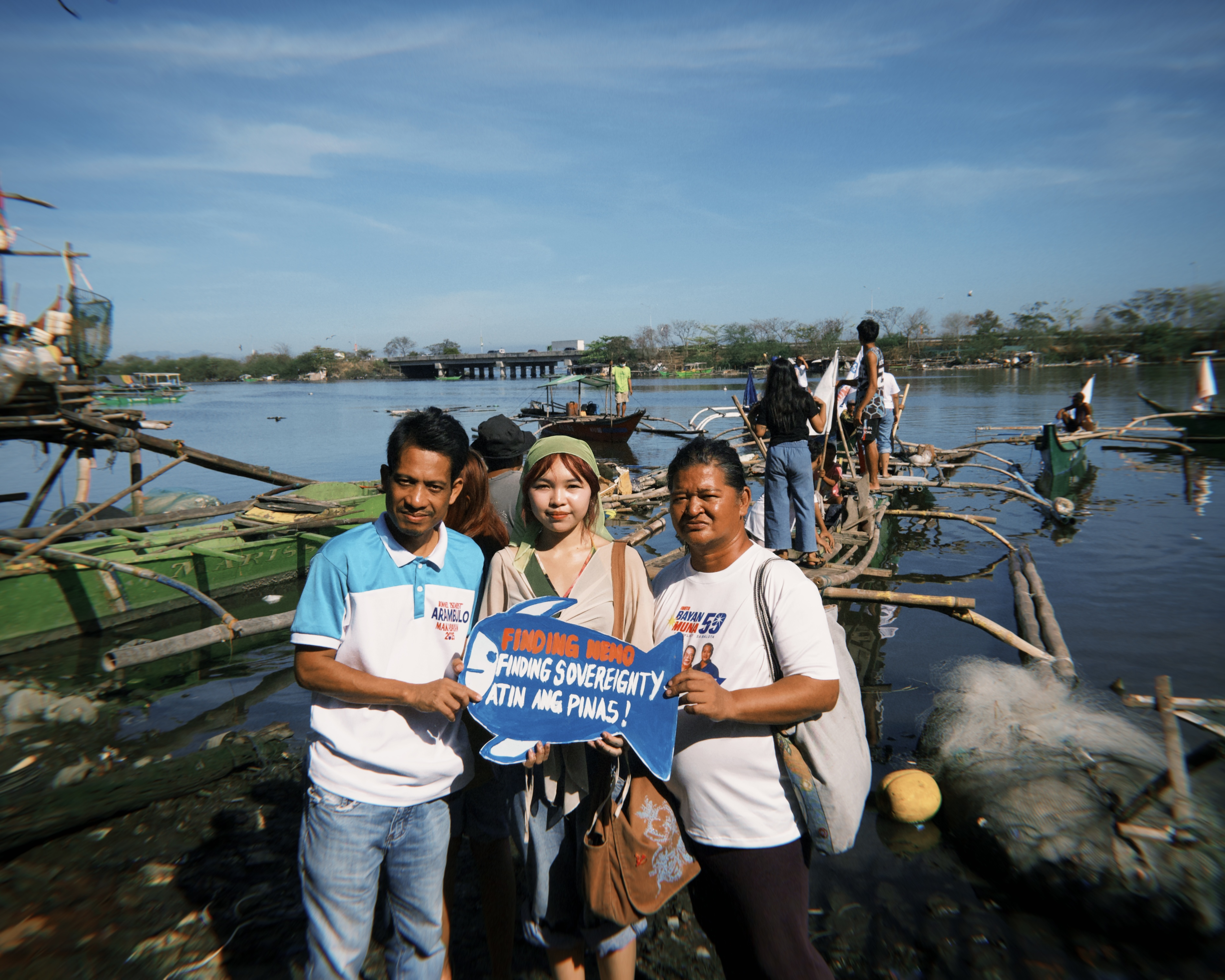
Ronnel Arambulo of Pamalakaya during a fluvial protest against demolition and reclamation in Bacoor, Cavite.

The group has been advocating of 'Atin Ang Kinse' (15 [kilometers] is ours) Bill or House Bill No. 5606 which endorses the exclusive use of 15-kilometer municipal waters towards the exclusive use of small-scale and subsistence fisherfolk. The group, wanting to protect the rights of small fisherfolk, has been pushing this bill against the interests of large commercial fishing enterprises.

=== Environmental concerns ===
Pamalakaya has consistently opposed projects that it deemed anti-environment and anti-fisherfolk, including land reclamation. The group opposes all reclamation activities in Metro Manila especially along Manila Bay. It said that the 420-hectare reclamation project by Frabelle Fishing Corporation and Bacoor City Government would adversely affect more than 100 families along the coast. Additionally, the group also called for the halting of reclamation activities relating to the New Manila International Airport, lambasting San Miguel Corporation and former President Rodrigo Duterte as responsible for the destruction of mangroves and coastal communities in Taliptip, Bulakan, Bulacan.

Members of parliaments group ASEAN Parliamentarians for Human Rights (APHR) have expressed support towards the calls of Pamalakaya and Kalikasan against reclamation. Among those who oppose reclamation activities include Malaysian parliamentarians Lee Chean Chung and Charles Santiago, Angelina Sarmiento of Timor Leste, and Mercy Chriesty Barends of Indonesia.

=== Anti-corruption ===
Pamalakaya has joined the on-going anti-corruption protests around the Philippines. On September 9, 2025, they protested against alleged corruption involving Navotas City flood control projects. They also participated in Baha sa Luneta on September 21.

=== Anti-imperialism ===
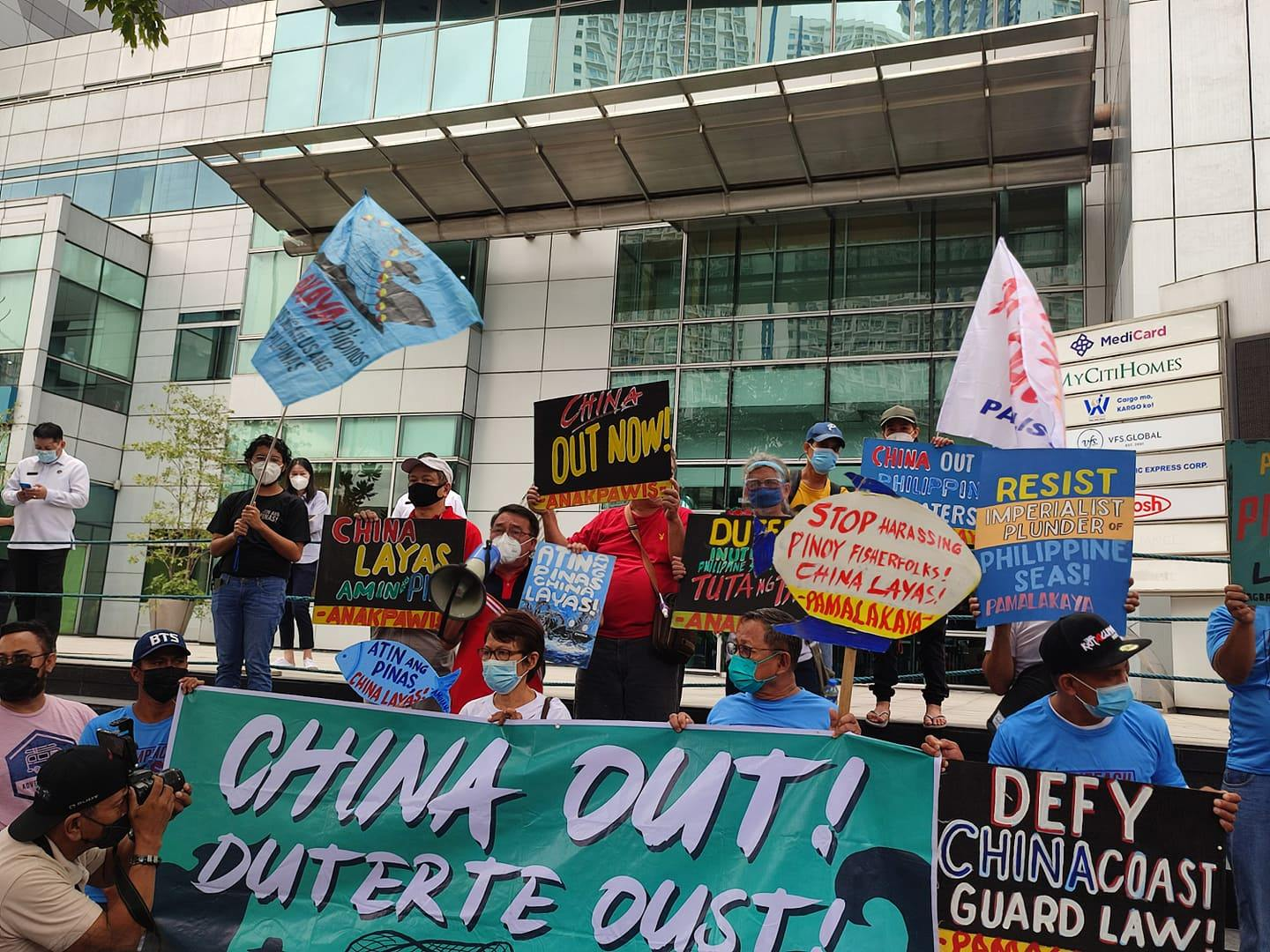
Mobilization outside the Chinese Consulate, Makati.

The group has been at the forefront of protests against Chinese aggressions on West Philippine Sea. Arambulo led grassroots campaigns such as fluvial protests. He led the 2023 protest in front of the Chinese Consulate in Makati protesting against the harassment against Filipino fisherfolk in Zambales. In relation, Pamalakaya filed an impeachment case against Duterte.

The group also protested against US Imperialism, including the proposal for the US to build an ammo factory in Subic Bay, saying that the missiles facility threatens the livelihood of fisherfolk through the discharge of chemicals. Moreover, the group also called against such provocations against China, saying that Filipinos would not want to be caught in a war between US and China.
