= List of Cultural Properties of the Philippines in Bulakan, Bulacan =

The following lists down built heritage found in Bulakan, Bulacan, Philippines pursuant to the Republic Act No. 10066 or the National Cultural Heritage Act of 2009.

Cultural Property wmph identifier (Note: wmph is an internal identifier used by Wikimedia Philippines to identify the monument. This is not an official identifier, and only shown temporarily in the templates until the government creates an updated complete list.)	Site name	Description	Province	City or municipality	Address	Coordinates	Image
	Agustin House		Bulacan	Bulakan	Malolos – Bulakan road	14°48′26″N 120°51′36″E	Upload file
	Bernabe-Coronel House		Bulacan	Bulakan	Malolos – Bulakan road	14°47′49″N 120°52′27″E	Upload file
	Bernabe House		Bulacan	Bulakan	Malolos – Bulakan road	14°47′49″N 120°52′28″E	Upload file
	Bonifacio Enriquez House		Bulacan	Bulakan	Camino Real Road	14°47′47″N 120°52′32″E	Upload file
	Bulakan Catholic Cemetery		Bulacan	Bulakan		14°47′45″N 120°52′49″E	Upload file
	Calimon House		Bulacan	Bulakan	Raang Bato street	14°47′21″N 120°52′42″E	Upload file
	Cárcel Provincial Ruins	Spanish-era provincial jail ruins	Bulacan	Bulakan	Camino Real corner Balubad Road	14°47′50″N 120°52′28″E	Upload file
	Credo House		Bulacan	Bulakan	Camino Real Road	14°47′42″N 120°52′43″E	Upload file
	Cupang Bridge	Remains of a Spanish-era stone bridge	Bulacan	Bulakan		14°47′49″N 120°52′29″E	Upload file
	Custodio Ancestral House		Bulacan	Bulakan	Daang Estacion Street	14°47′52″N 120°52′31″E	Upload file
	De Jesus House		Bulacan	Bulakan	Paniqui Street	14°47′38″N 120°52′34″E	Upload file
	Dela Peña House		Bulacan	Bulakan	Camino Real	14°47′43″N 120°52′40″E	Upload file
	Delgado House	Late 19th century bahay na bato	Bulacan	Bulakan	Sandaran Street	14°47′31″N 120°52′51″E	Upload file
	Eugenia Sepulveda-Fernando House		Bulacan	Bulakan		14°47′49″N 120°52′28″E	Upload file
	Felizardo House		Bulacan	Bulakan	Sandaran Street	14°47′37″N 120°52′50″E	Upload file
	Garcia-Del Rosario House		Bulacan	Bulakan	Camino Real Road	14°47′42″N 120°52′44″E	Upload file
	Gen. Gregorio del Pilar Elementary School	American-era Gabaldon-type Schoolhouse	Bulacan	Bulakan	Sadsaran Street	14°47′36″N 120°52′52″E	Upload file
	Gonzales Ancestral House		Bulacan	Bulakan		14°47′19″N 120°52′56″E	Upload file
	Hernandez House		Bulacan	Bulakan	Camino Real Road	14°47′43″N 120°52′41″E	Upload file
	Icasiano House		Bulacan	Bulakan		14°47′41″N 120°52′43″E	Upload file
	Liwanag House		Bulacan	Bulakan		14°47′51″N 120°52′16″E	Upload file
	Manahan Ancestral House		Bulacan	Bulakan	Bulakan - Malolos Road	14°48′25″N 120°51′36″E	Upload file
	Marcelo H. Del Pilar Memorial Elementary School	1929 Gabaldon-type school building	Bulacan	Bulakan	Bulakan - Malolos Road	14°47′51″N 120°52′05″E	Upload file
	Marcelo H. Del Pilar National Shrine	National Historical Shrine, with marker from the National Historical Commission of the Philippines	Bulacan	Bulakan	Bulakan - Malolos Road	14°47′50″N 120°52′08″E	Upload file
	Meneses-Rodrigo Ancestral House		Bulacan	Bulakan	Camino Real Road	14°47′50″N 120°52′26″E	Upload file
	Molina Ancestral House		Bulacan	Bulakan		14°47′49″N 120°52′39″E	Upload file
	Nuestra Señora de la Asuncion Parish Church	18th-century Baroque church, with marker from the National Historical Commission of the Philippines	Bulacan	Bulakan	Camino Real Road	14°47′43″N 120°52′47″E	Upload file
	Lava Ancestral House		Bulacan	Bulakan	Daang Estacion Street	14°47′46″N 120°52′41″E	Upload file
	Rodrigo Ancestral House		Bulacan	Bulakan	Bulakan – Malolos Road	14°47′52″N 120°52′09″E	Upload file
	Senator Francisco "Soc" Rodrigo House	House of former senator Francisco “Soc” Rodrigo, with marker from the National Historical Commission of the Philippines	Bulacan	Bulakan	Daang Estacion Street	14°47′50″N 120°52′37″E	Upload file
	Ycasiano-Enriquez Ancestral House	Spanish-era ancestral house, house of local food historian Mila Enriquez	Bulacan	Bulakan	Matungao Road	14°47′51″N 120°52′40″E	Upload file
