= Bulakan, Bulacan =

Municipality in Bulacan, Philippines

Bulakan Bulacan
- Municipality
- Municipality of Bulakan
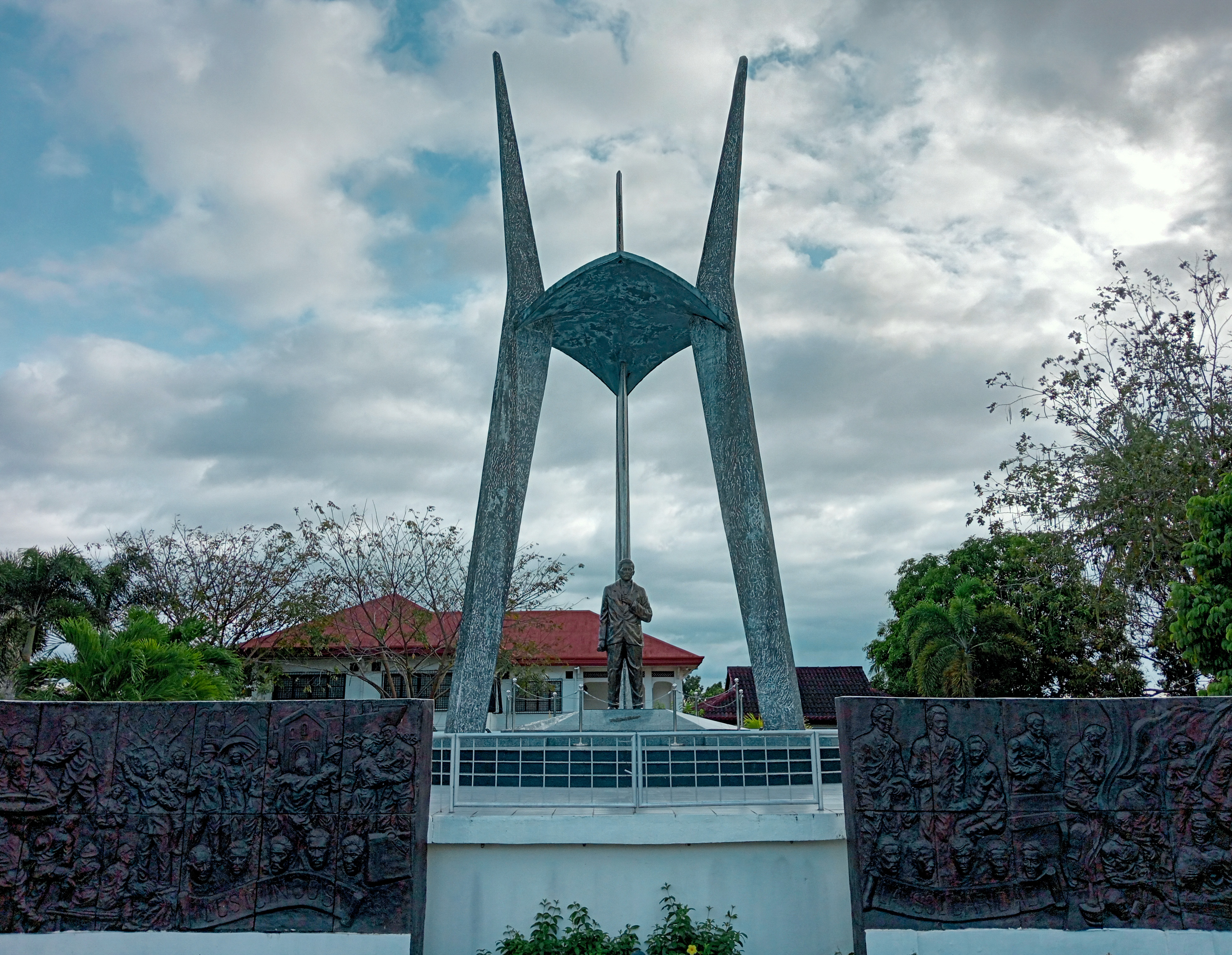
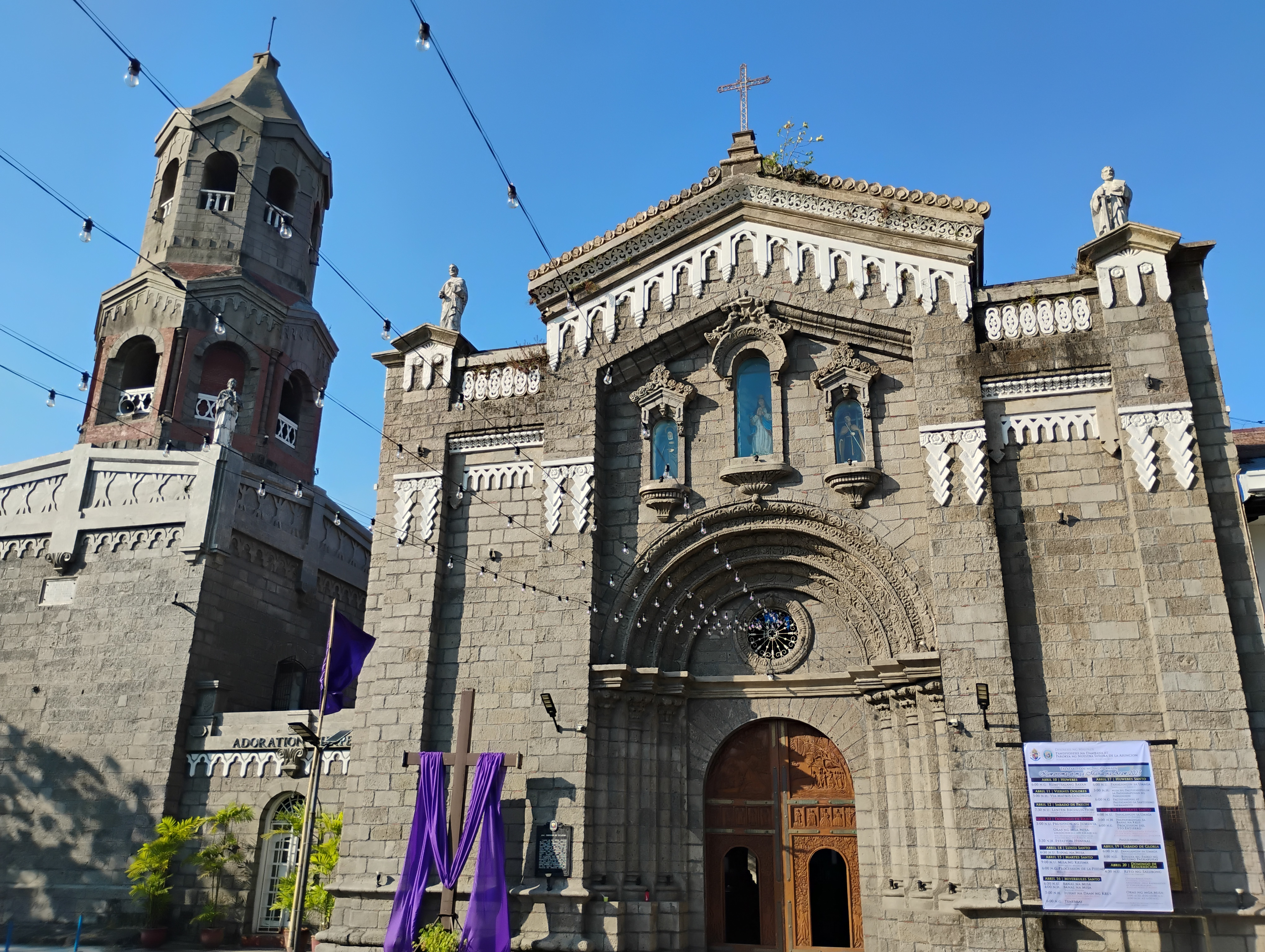
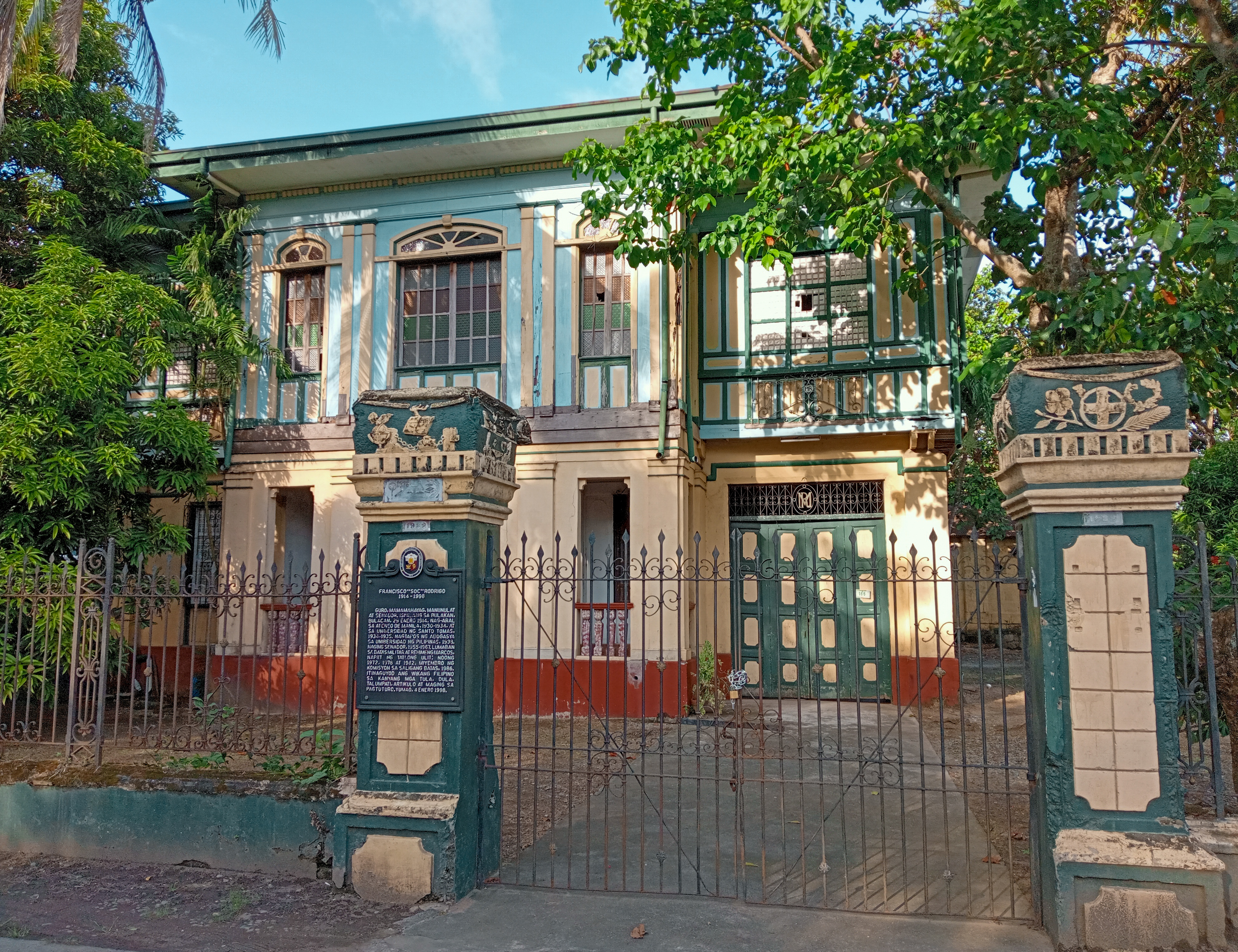
- Marcelo H. Del Pilar Shrine Our Lady of the Assumption Parish Church Francisco Soc Rodrigo Ancestral House

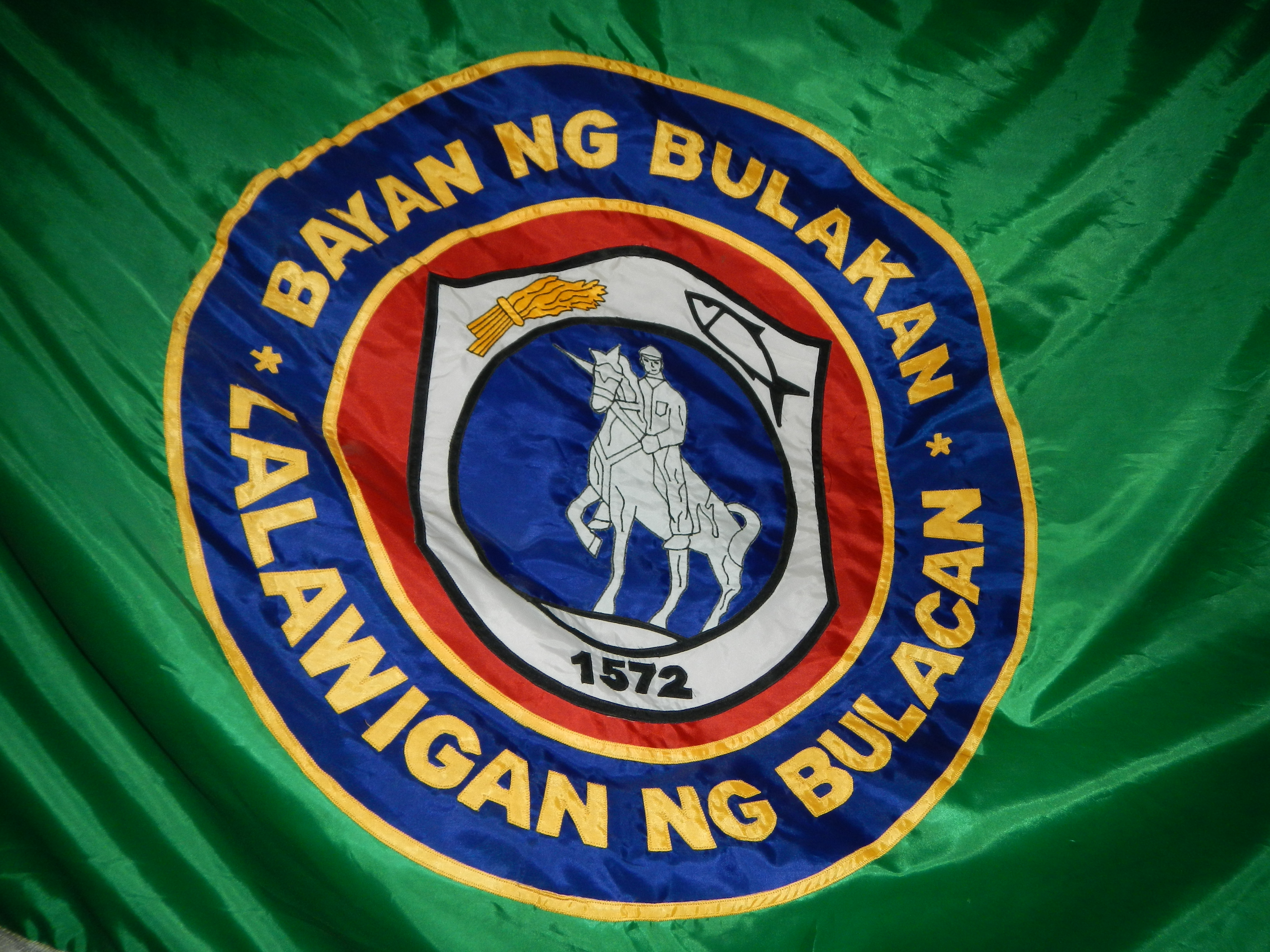
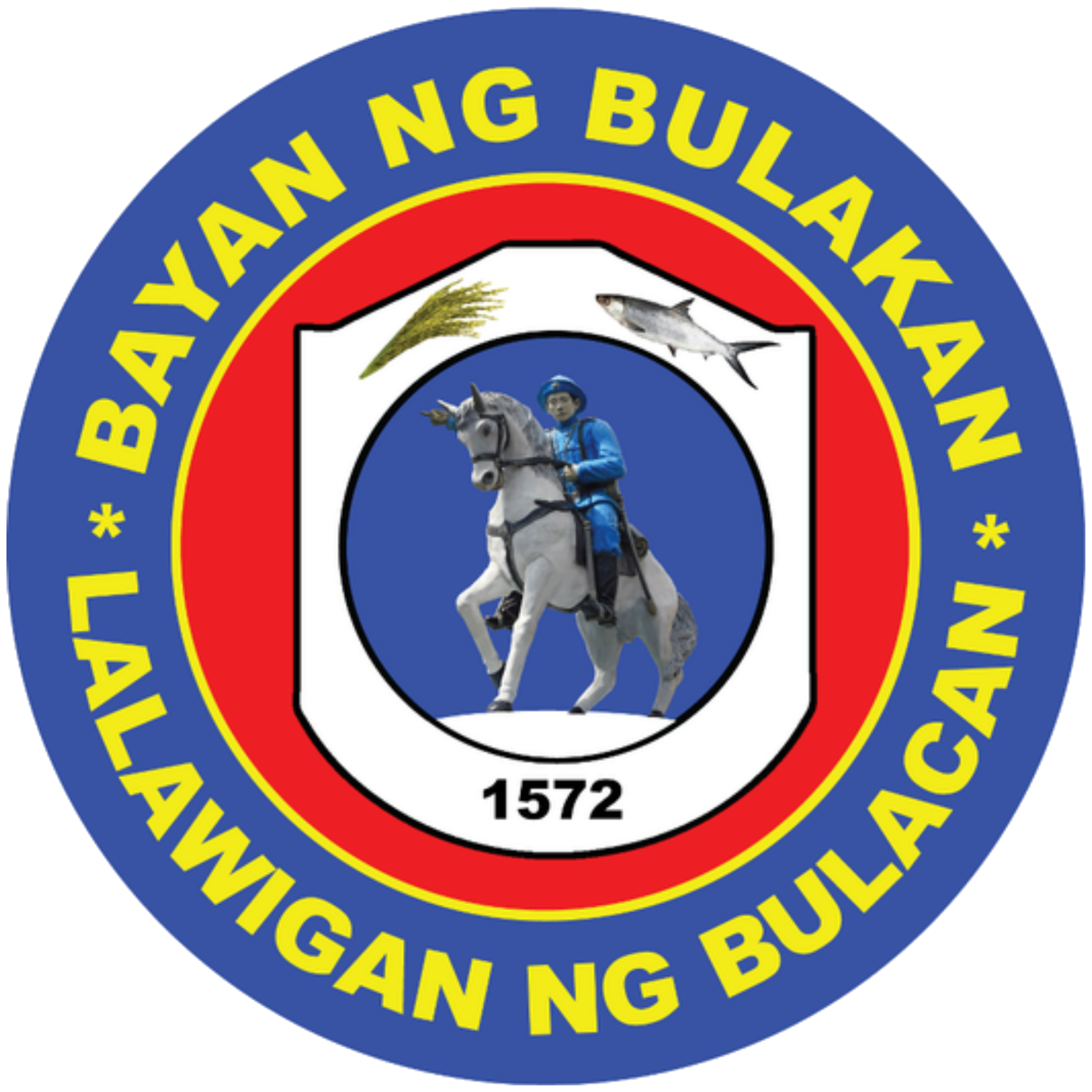
- Flag Seal
- Nickname: First Capital of Bulacan
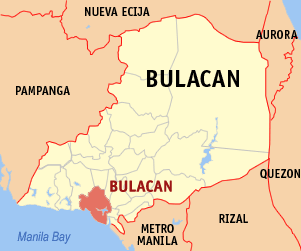
- Map of Bulacan with Bulakan highlighted
- Interactive map of Bulakan
- Location within the Philippines
- Coordinates: 14°47′34″N 120°52′44″E
- Country: Philippines
- Region: Central Luzon
- Province: Bulacan
- District: 1st district
- Founded: 1572
- Barangays: 14 (see Barangays)

Government
  - Type: Sangguniang Bayan
  - Mayor: Vergel C. Meneses
  - Vice Mayor: Aron Ronald R. Cruz (PFP)
  - Representative: Danilo A. Domingo (NUP)
  - Municipal Council: Members: Bienvenido M. Cruz Jr.; Patrick Ian D. Catindig; Ma. Gloria D. Mendoza; Veronica Michaela V. Meneses; Rchie E. San Jose; Piccolo Iñigo F. Meneses; Ana Marie V. Pagsibagan; Michael M. Ramos
  - Electorate: 54,078 voters (2025)

Area
  - Total: 72.90 km^{2} (28.15 sq mi)
- Elevation: 5.0 m (16.4 ft)
- Highest elevation: 37 m (121 ft)
- Lowest elevation: −5 m (−16 ft)

Population (2024 census)
  - Total: 83,101
  - Density: 1,140/km^{2} (2,952/sq mi)
  - Households: 20,746
- Demonym: Bulakeño

Economy
  - Income class: 1st municipal income class
  - Poverty incidence: 9.4% (2023)
  - Revenue: ₱ 447.4 million (2024)
  - Assets: ₱ 881.2 million (2024)
  - Expenditure: ₱ 394.7 million (2024)
  - Liabilities: ₱ 347.8 million (2024)

Utilities
  - Electricity: Meralco
- Time zone: UTC+8 (PST)
- ZIP code: 3017
- PSGC: 0301405000
- IDD : area code: +63 (0)44
- Native languages: Tagalog
- Major religions: Roman Catholicism
- Catholic diocese: Malolos

Bulakan, officially the Municipality of Bulakan (Tagalog: Bayan ng Bulakan), is a municipality in the province of Bulacan, Philippines. According to the 2024 census, it has a population of 83,101 people.

Bulakan, which is one of the oldest towns in the Philippines, became the encomienda or capital of the Provincia de la Pampanga, and later became the first capital of the Province of Bulacan before it was moved to Malolos early during the American occupation.

With regard to whether to use the letters "c" or "k" to refer to the municipality of Bulakan, the New Provincial Administrative Code of Bulacan (Ordinance no. C-004) of 2007 states on Chapter 2, Section 15 that the word "Bulakan" stands for the municipality and first capital of the province while "Bulacan" refers to the province itself.

== Etymology ==
The town got its name is from the Tagalog word bulak, which means cotton in English. It was named Bulakan due to the abundance of cotton plant growing in the region.

== History ==
=== Foundation ===
The Augustinians founded Bulakan as one of the visitas of Convento de Tondo in 1575 under its minister Fray Alonzo Alvarado, OSA. In 1578, it became a town Parish and Convent dedicated it under the patronage of Nuestra Señora de la Asunción with Caluya (now Balagtas, became town in 1599) and Guiguinto (became town in 1641) as its visitas. According to local records, Father Agustin del Alburqueque, OSA is the first Prior of the Town.

In a census of June 1591, the Province of Bulacan had 1,200 tributes or 4,800 persons, one Augustinian convent, one Gobernadorcillo and one alcalde mayor (present day governor) who had jurisdiction over the towns of Bulakan (then capital) Malolos, Calumpit, Guiguinto, Caluya and Meycauayan.

In the heart of the town stands the centuries-old adobe church of Our Lady of the Assumption (Nuestra Señora de la Asunción). In front of the church stands the municipal hall and a park named "Plaza del Pilar", which is dedicated to Revolutionary General Gregorio del Pilar who hailed from Barangay San Jose, Bulakan.

The Parish Church of Our Lady of the Assumption is the second oldest Roman Catholic church in the province and the longest and widest in terms of aisle length and span respectively. It has a baptismal book entry as early as 1578. On the first page of the book, written was the name of the barrio of the town of Bulacan, Bagio, Bulacan (Camino Real), Daan Estacion, Matungao, Cupang, Banban, Dapdap, Parian, Balubad, Pitpitan, Maysantor, Acsajo, Paniqui, San Nicolas, Nagdasig, Calungusan, Taliktik and Sta Ana.

After 400 years, changes have been made to the old barrios that consist of the town. Bagio became part of Bagumbayan in 1731, Tibig exist in 1735, Dapdap was renamed Santa Ana in 1741, Nagdasig become part of Tab-Ang in 1744 and now San Francisco, Parian was renamed Santa Inez in 1765, Bulacan (Camino Real), Daan Estacion, Paniqui and Calungusan was created into one barrio and was named San Jose, Barrio Pitpitan occupied Acsajo, Cupang was joined to Maysantor now Maysantol, Banban became Bangbang and now Bambang, Perez exists as separate barrio of Taliktik (now Taliptip), and with the same old name of barrios San Nicolas, Matungao and Balubad.

The early Bulaqueños, the residents of Bulakan, were engaged in farming, fishing and handicrafts, especially weaving.

The town of Bulakan, being the first capital of the province, gave the name to the province as customary to the other provinces of the early Philippines (like Cavite, Cavite; Tayabas, Tayabas (now Quezon Province) or Batangas, Batangas). It was the hub of economic activities and the inhabitants enjoyed excellent trade with Manila, primarily due to its proximity to the city and accessibility through its wide and navigable river.

=== British invasion of Bulacan ===
Bulakan was also the scene of battle between the Spaniards led by Simón de Anda y Salazar and the British led by Captain Slay during the short British occupation of Manila. The British sent an expedition of 400 British, 300 Malabar Negroes and 2,000 Chinese allies. The Spaniards, with the natives of Bulacan, made a gallant stand but were defeated. Captain Slay eventually took over the town but did not last long.

A huge group of about 8,000 Filipino guerillas led by Spanish Jose Pedro de Busto made a nine-day battle in front of the church up to the foot bridge against Captain Slay, forcing him to retreat to Manila.

=== Bulakan Church ===
The Church of Nuestra Señora de la Asuncion is the birthplace of Flores de Mayo, a feast for the Virgin Mary, held throughout the Philippines in the month of May. It is also the birthplace of the traditional song Dalit, a poetic chant for the patrons of a certain barrio or town. For centuries, the Church of the Our Lady of the Assumption served as the bastion of the Catholic faith all over the province. It served as the central church: a cathedral-like church serving as a primus inter pares among the Poblacion churches of Bulakan.

After the erection of the Diocese of Malolos, its former glory slowly faded as the focus turned to the cathedral of the neighboring town Malolos: a church erected 2 years later in 1580. As the former capital of the secular rule, as well as the fortress of Christianity, it is due to give honor to this century-old church. Thus, the faithful along with the incumbent parish priest, Rev. Fr. Manuel Manicad, petitioned a request to the bishop, Jose Francisco Oliveros, Bishop of Malolos, to declare the church as a Diocesan Shrine. On November 28, 2020 the fifth bishop of Malolos, Most Rev. Dennis Villarojo D.D. elevated the parish as a Diocesan Shrine, on the same day, the venerated image of Nuestra Señora de la Asuncion received the Solemn Episcopal Coronation.

The town still enjoys trade and commerce with the neighboring towns and Manila with whom it shares a coastline.

== Geography ==
The municipality of Bulakan lies in the southwestern part of the province of Bulacan and is surrounded by a number of municipalities. It is bounded to the north by the municipality of Guiguinto, to the south by Manila Bay, to the east by the municipality of Bocaue, to the northwest by the city of Malolos, to the northeast by the municipality of Balagtas, on the southeast by the city of Meycauayan and to the southeast by the municipality of Obando.

It is 35 kilometers (22 mi) north of Manila. Approximately 72.90 square kilometres (28.15 sq mi) or 2.7284% of the total land area of the entire province. It ranks tenth (10th) in terms of land area among other municipalities in the province.

=== Barangays ===
Bulakan is politically subdivided into 14 barangays, as shown in the matrix below. Barangays San Jose and Bagumbayan are classified by the Philippine Statistics Authority as urban, with the rest as rural. Pariahan in Barangay Taliptip was a small village in the municipality suffering from sea level rise and land subsidence.

These barangays are headed by elected officials: Barangay Captain, Barangay Council, whose members are called Barangay Councilors. All are elected every three years. Each barangay consist of 7 puroks and some have sitios.

PSGC	Barangay	Population			±% p.a.	
		2024		2010		
031405001	Bagumbayan	4.5%	3,701	3,279	▴	0.84%
031405002	Balubad	4.0%	3,357	3,076	▴	0.61%
031405003	Bambang	16.4%	13,604	13,566	▴	0.02%
031405004	Matungao	14.0%	11,646	9,699	▴	1.28%
031405005	Maysantol	3.3%	2,768	2,712	▴	0.14%
031405006	Perez	2.9%	2,381	2,152	▴	0.70%
031405007	Pitpitan	5.4%	4,516	4,028	▴	0.80%
031405009	San Francisco	7.4%	6,145	5,221	▴	1.14%
031405010	San Jose (Poblacion)	4.1%	3,372	3,327	▴	0.09%
031405012	San Nicolas	7.0%	5,804	5,282	▴	0.66%
031405013	Santa Ana	9.8%	8,122	7,685	▴	0.38%
031405014	Santa Ines	3.0%	2,508	2,682	▾	−0.46%
031405015	Taliptip	6.6%	5,490	6,202	▾	−0.84%
031405016	Tibig	3.8%	3,151	2,840	▴	0.72%
	Total		83,101	71,751	▴	1.02%

=== Climate ===
Climate data for Bulakan, Bulacan
Month	Jan	Feb	Mar	Apr	May	Jun	Jul	Aug	Sep	Oct	Nov	Dec	Year
Mean daily maximum °C (°F)	29 (84)	30 (86)	32 (90)	34 (93)	33 (91)	31 (88)	30 (86)	29 (84)	29 (84)	30 (86)	30 (86)	29 (84)	31 (87)
Mean daily minimum °C (°F)	19 (66)	20 (68)	21 (70)	23 (73)	24 (75)	25 (77)	24 (75)	24 (75)	24 (75)	23 (73)	22 (72)	21 (70)	23 (72)
Average precipitation mm (inches)	7 (0.3)	7 (0.3)	9 (0.4)	21 (0.8)	101 (4.0)	152 (6.0)	188 (7.4)	170 (6.7)	159 (6.3)	115 (4.5)	47 (1.9)	29 (1.1)	1,005 (39.7)
Average rainy days	3.3	3.5	11.1	8.1	18.9	23.5	26.4	25.5	24.5	19.6	10.4	6.4	181.2
Source: Meteoblue

== Demographics ==
Population census of Bulakan
Year	Pop.	±% p.a.
1903	11,589	—
1918	10,423	−0.70%
1939	11,931	+0.65%
1948	13,242	+1.17%
1960	18,395	+2.78%
1970	26,750	+3.81%
1975	28,361	+1.18%
1980	34,920	+4.25%
1990	48,770	+3.40%
1995	54,236	+2.01%
2000	62,903	+3.23%
2007	72,289	+1.94%
2010	71,751	−0.27%
2015	76,565	+1.24%
2020	81,232	+1.25%
2024	83,101	+0.55%
Source: Philippine Statistics Authority

In the 2020 census, the population of Bulakan, was 81,232 people, with a density of 1,100 inhabitants per square kilometre or 2,800 inhabitants per square mile.

In the 2010 census, the Municipality of Bulakan had a total population of 71,751. Barangay Bambang is the most densely populated with 13,566. It is followed by Barangay Matungao and Barangay Santa Ana with 9,699 and 7,685 respectively, on the other hand, the least populated barangay are Barangay Perez and Barangay Santa Ines with 2,152 and 2,682 respectively.

Compared with the Municipality's population in 1995 which was 54,624, it shows an increase of 10,060 persons from 1995 to 2004. An annual growth rate of 1,117 or an average increase of 18.42% in the span of nine years.

The highest percentage changes in population from 1995 to 2004 was exhibited in Barangay Perez, Pitpitan, Santa Ines, Tibig, Bagumbayan with an increase of 56.33%, 54.74%, 39.73%, 34.66%, and 33.46% respectively.

On the other hand, barangays that shows the least percentage change in population are Barangay San Francisco, Matungao, and Bambang with only an increase of 0.4%, 2.95% and 7.57% respectively.

=== Number of households ===
The Community Base Monitoring System (CBMS) survey as of January 2005 showed 14,523 household. In comparison with the total number of households of 12,488 in 2002 an increase of 2,035 households from 2002 to 2005 is realized.

=== Gender and age structure ===
Like the rest of the country, the population in Bulakan exhibits a pyramidal age structure. The population between the age 0-14 accounts for 18,586 or 35% of the total population. On the other hand, 31,963 or 61% belongs to the 15–64 years old age bracket and only 2,103 or 4% are in the age bracket of 65 years old and above.

In terms of gender distribution, the female population slightly outnumbered the male population by .47% in 2002 Census on Population. There were 31,553 male population as against the 31,702 female population which results to gender ratio of 1 male is to 1.004 female comparatively.

=== Religion ===
The Roman Catholic, remained the dominant religion since its propagation in the town 1572. Out of the 64,684 total population in 2004, 56,436 or 87.25% were Roman Catholics. Other Christians faith that have found their way in the town are Members Church of God International more known as Ang Dating Daan, Iglesia ni Cristo, United Methodist Church, United Church of Christ in the Philippines, Jesus Is Lord Church Worldwide and many others.

==== Our Lady of Assumption Parish Church ====
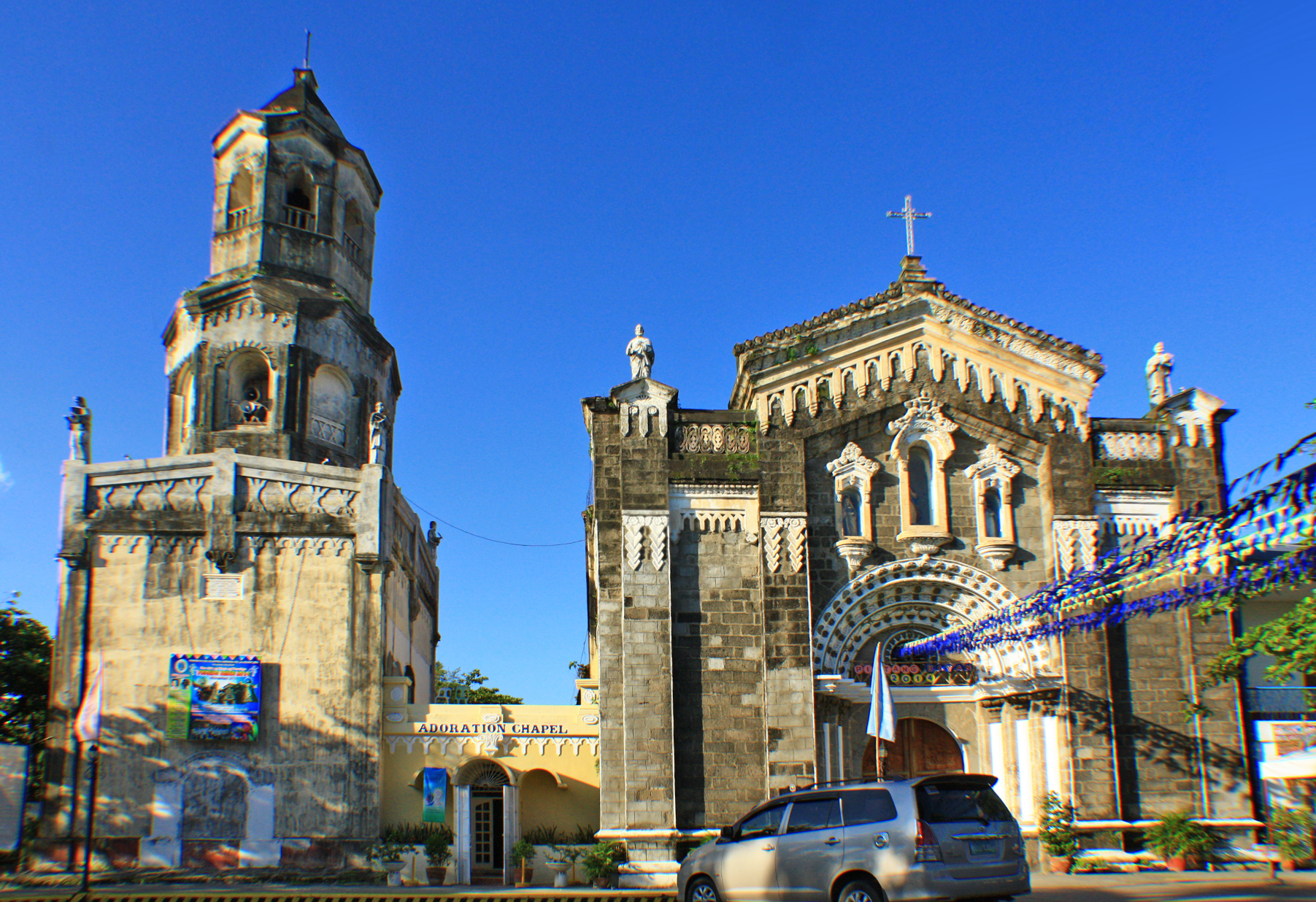
Façade of the Nuestra Señora de la Asuncion Parish Church

The town's parish church, the Iglesia Parroquial de Nuestra Señora de la Asuncion, under the jurisdiction of the Roman Catholic Diocese of Malolos, is one of the oldest and largest churches in Bulacan Province. It is the site where Gregorio Del Pilar distributed the pamphlets made by his uncle, Marcelo H. Del Pilar who is a member of the Propaganda Movement. The National Historical Commission of the Philippines installed a historical marker in 2007 that declared the Bulakan Church as a Marked Historical Structure.

=== Language ===
Generally, Bulakan is a Tagalog speaking town. About 86.8% speak Tagalog while the rest speak Kapampangan.

=== Literacy rate ===
The 2005 Community Based Monitoring System Survey shows that the Population of 10 years old and above are around 38,164 persons and about 37,822 have a literacy rate of 99.10 percent.

The 2005 Community Based Monitoring System Survey also shows that there are only 219 licensed professionals here, the lowest in the whole province.

== Economy ==
Poverty incidence of Bulakan (%)

Source: Philippine Statistics Authority

The New Manila International Airport is being proposed to be built somewhere in the coastlines of the municipality with target completion and commencement of operations in 2027.

== Government ==
=== Local government ===
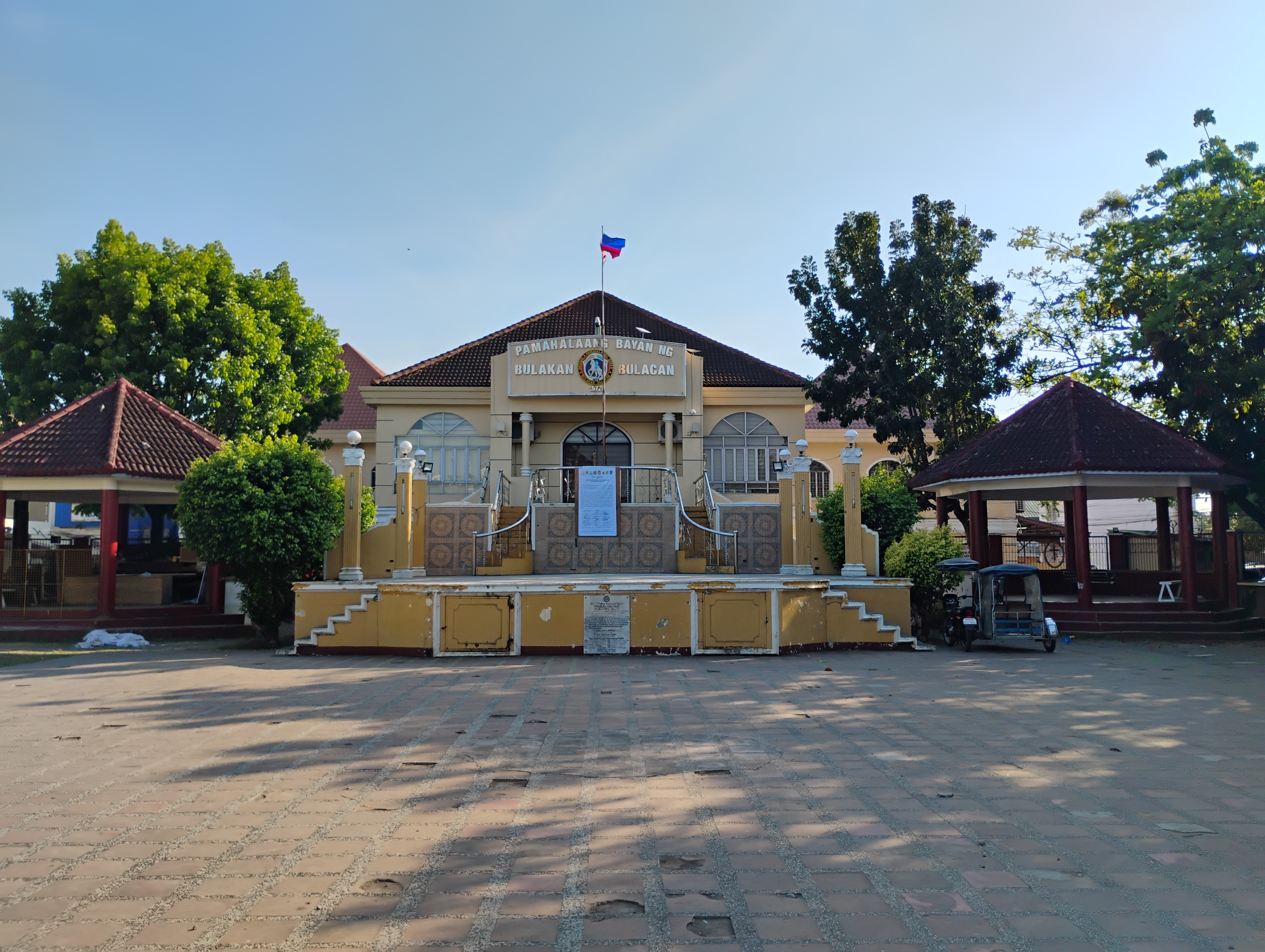
Bulakan Municipal Hall and Town Plaza

- Mayor: Vergel Meneses (NPC)
- Vice Mayor: Aron Ronald R. Cruz (PFP)
- Members of the Sangguniang Bayan:
  - Bienvenido M. Cruz Jr. (NPC)
  - Patrick Ian D. Catindig (NPC)
  - Ma. Gloria D. Mendoza (PFP)
  - Veronica Michaela V. Meneses (NPC)
  - Rchie E. San Jose (NPC)
  - Piccolo Iñigo F. Meneses (PFP)
  - Ana Marie V. Pagsibigan (NPC)
  - Michael M. Ramos (PFP)

== Culture ==
=== Feasts and festivals ===
In 2024, Bulakan launched the inaugural “Bangkaripas” festival of Barangay Tibig with the theme, ‘Ang Simula’. The 30-year-old tradition and cultural heritage of the village features colorful toy boats made of plastic or styrofoam competing in the “bangka-bangkaan” along Bulakan River. The boats are powered by hair dryer and the 1990's Tamiya mini 4WD motors.

== Education ==
The Bulacan Schools District Office governs all educational institutions within the municipality. It oversees the management and operations of all private and public, from primary to secondary schools.

Every barangay has its own day-care for pre-elementary pupils and an elementary school. There are also many private elementary schools situated in different barangays.

=== Primary and elementary schools ===
- Assumpta Academy
- Bagumbayan Primary School
- Bambang Elementary School
- Barnabbas Bulacan Cristian Academy
- Bulacan Central Christian School
- Bulacan Montessori School
- Dr. Litao Learning School
- Dr. Manuel S. Tansinsin Memorial School
- General Gregorio del Pilar Integrated School
- Immaculate Conception School of Malolos
- Jesus Reigns Christian Academy Foundation
- Jose L. Perez Memorial School
- Marcelo H. del Pilar Memorial School
- Matungao Elementary School
- Molder of Youth Montessori School
- Pitpitan Elementary School
- Smart Child Multiple Intelligence Academy
- St Stephen School of Bulacan
- Sta. Ana Elementary School
- Sta. Ines Elementary School
- Tabang Elementary School
- Taliptip Elementary School
- Tibig Primary School
- Young Achievers Montessori School

=== Secondary schools ===
- Assumpta Academy
- Doña Trinidad Mendoza Institute
- Bulacan Montessori School
- Bulacan Methodist School
- Bulacan Central Christian School
- Doña Candeleria Meneses Duque Memorial High School
- Doña Trinidad Mendoza Institute
- General Gregorio del Pilar Integrated School
- Romeo Acuña Santos Memorial High School
- San Francisco Xavier High School
- Taliptip National High School

=== Higher educational institution ===
- Bulacan State University - Meneses Campus is a satellite campus of Bulacan State University, situated in Barangay Matungao.

== Notable personalities ==
- Marcelo H. del Pilar – patriot, lawyer, journalist and activist, he was one of the leaders of the Propaganda Movement during the Spanish period and served as the second editor-in-chief of La Solidaridad; more known by his pseudonym "Plaridel", having him the origin of the name of the neighboring town Plaridel, Bulacan
- Gregorio del Pilar – Katipunero nephew of Marcelo H. del Pilar, served as one of the youngest generals of the Philippine Revolution and the First Philippine Republic; known as the "Hero of Battle of Tirad Pass"
- Tess Lazaro – diplomat and secretary of foreign affairs
- Vicente Lava – Chemist and General Secretary of the Communist Party of the Philippines (1942–1944)
- Francisco Soc Rodrigo – lawyer, educator, broadcaster, journalist, playwright, and statesman having served as a member of the Senate of the Philippines from 1960 to 1972 and as a Commissioner on the 1986 Constitutional Commission. The "Gawad Soc Rodrigo" award was named after him by the Komisyon ng Wikang Filipino and National Commission for Culture and the Arts.

== Gallery ==
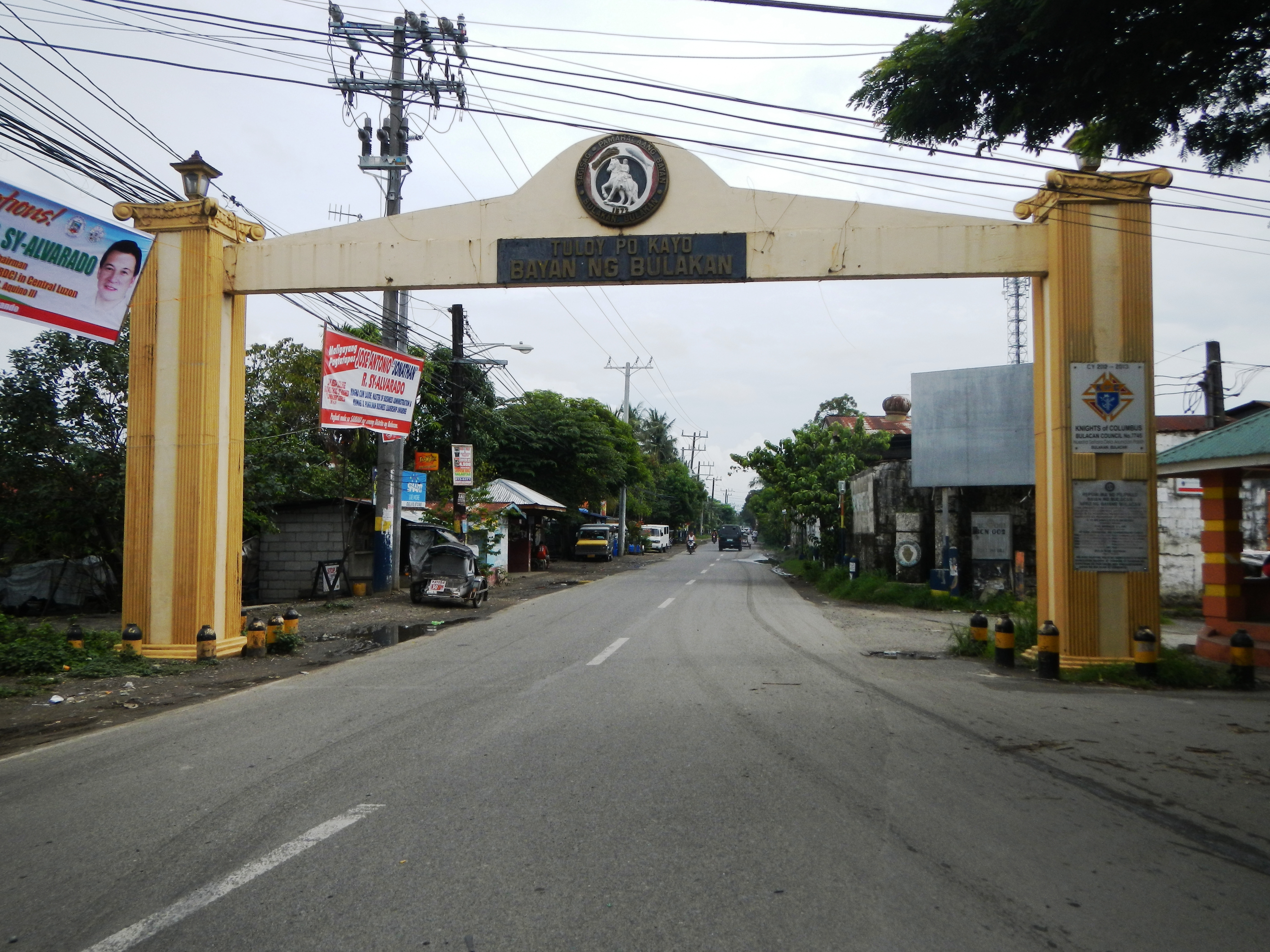
Bulakan Welcome Arch (from Guiguinto)

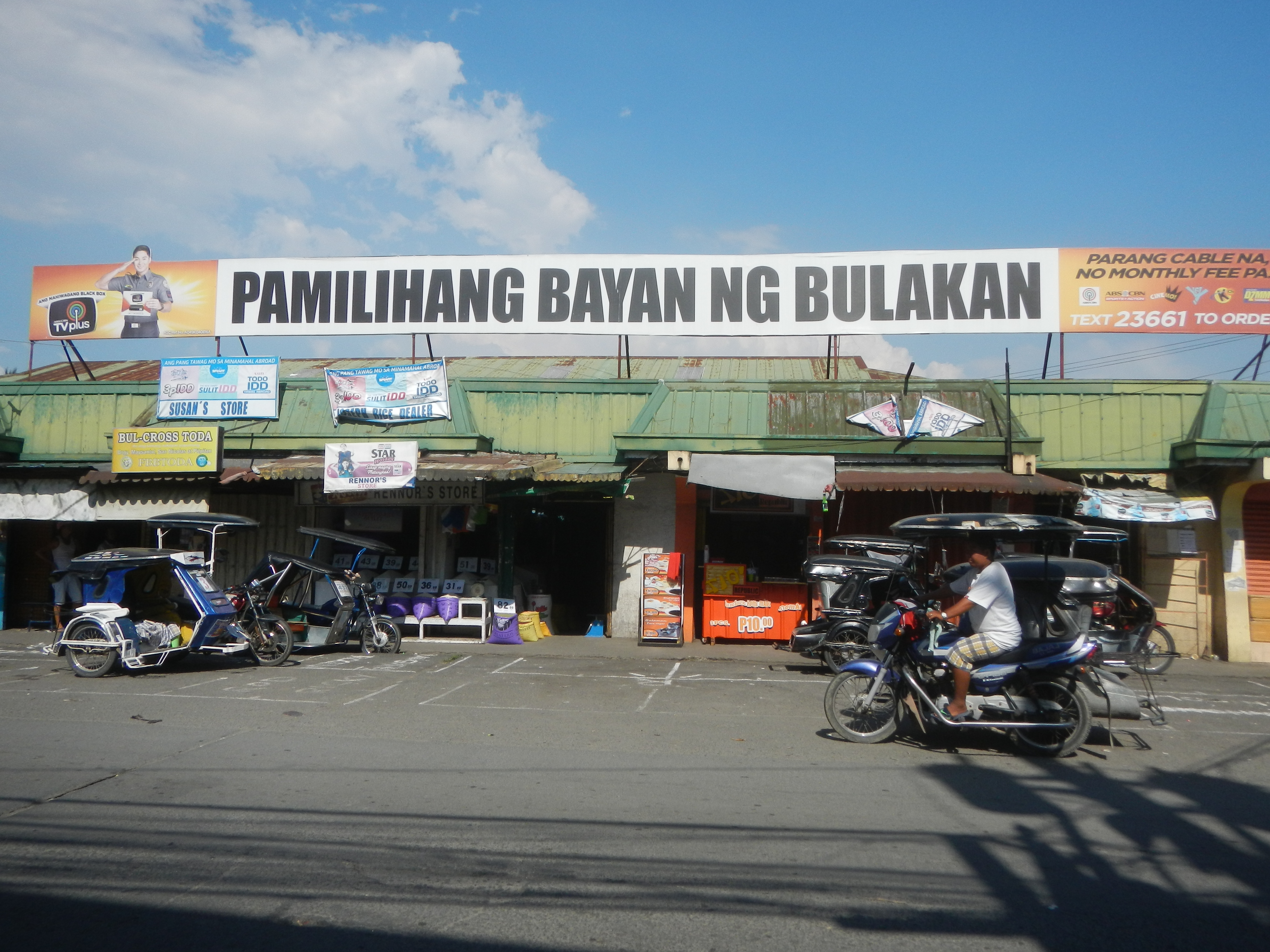
Bulakan Wet and Dry Public Market

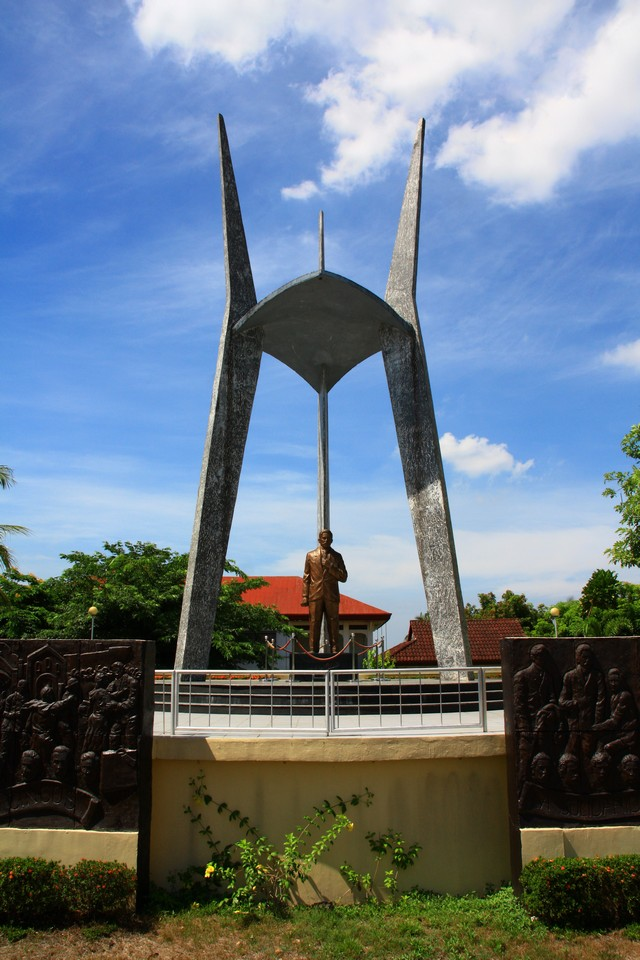
Marcelo H. Del Pilar National Shrine

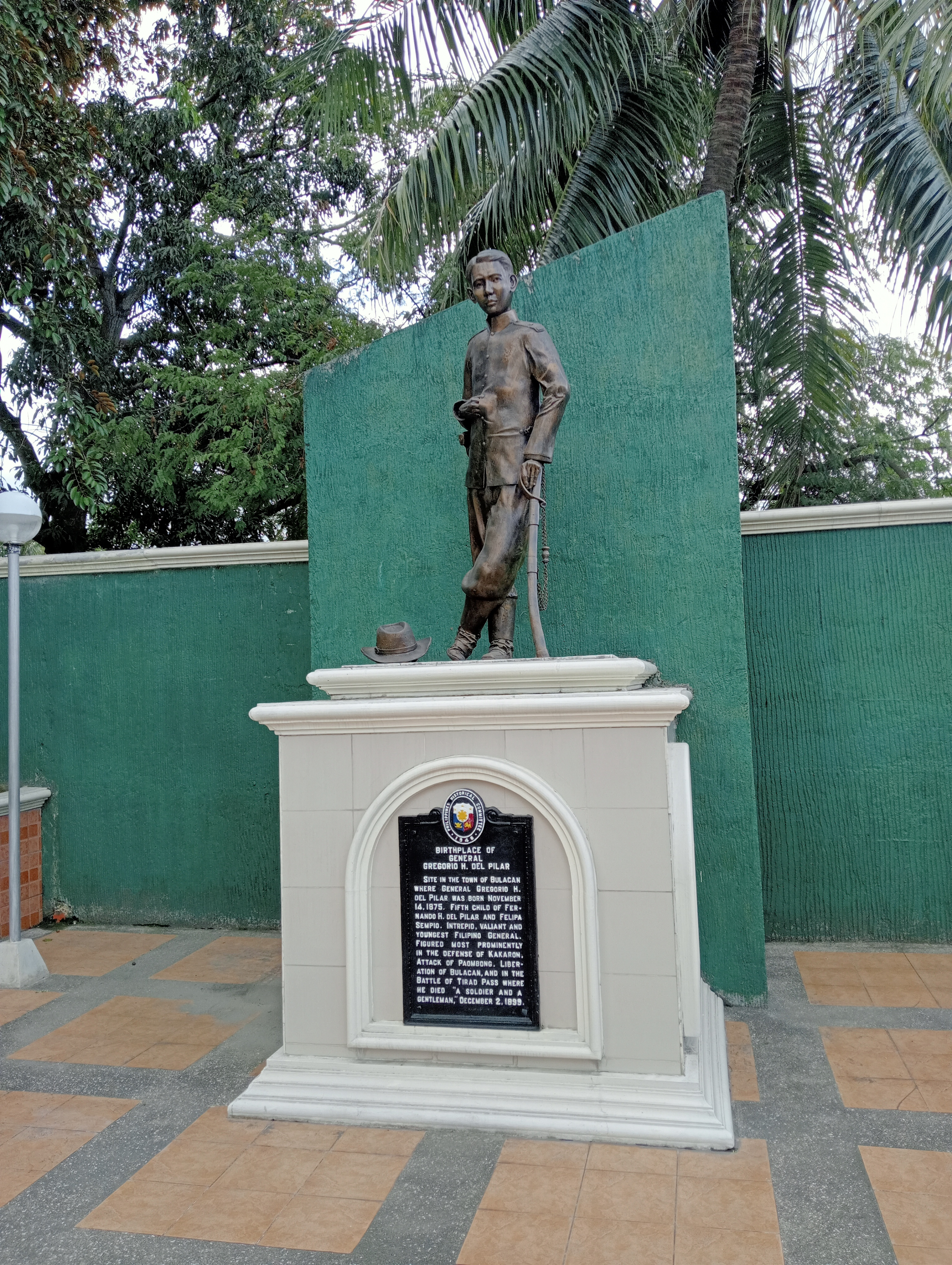
Gregorio Del Pilar Monument

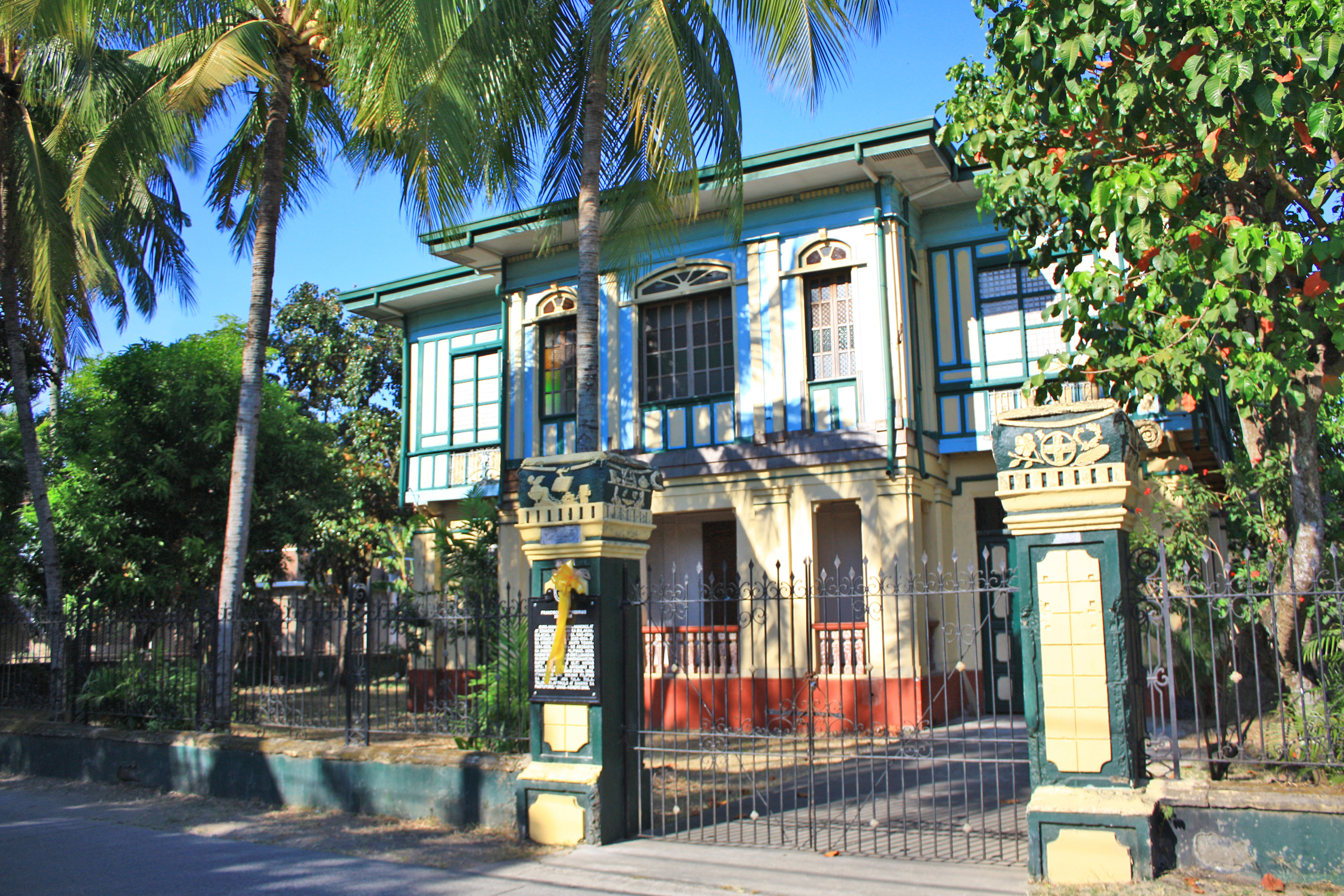
Francisco Soc Rodrigo Ancestral House

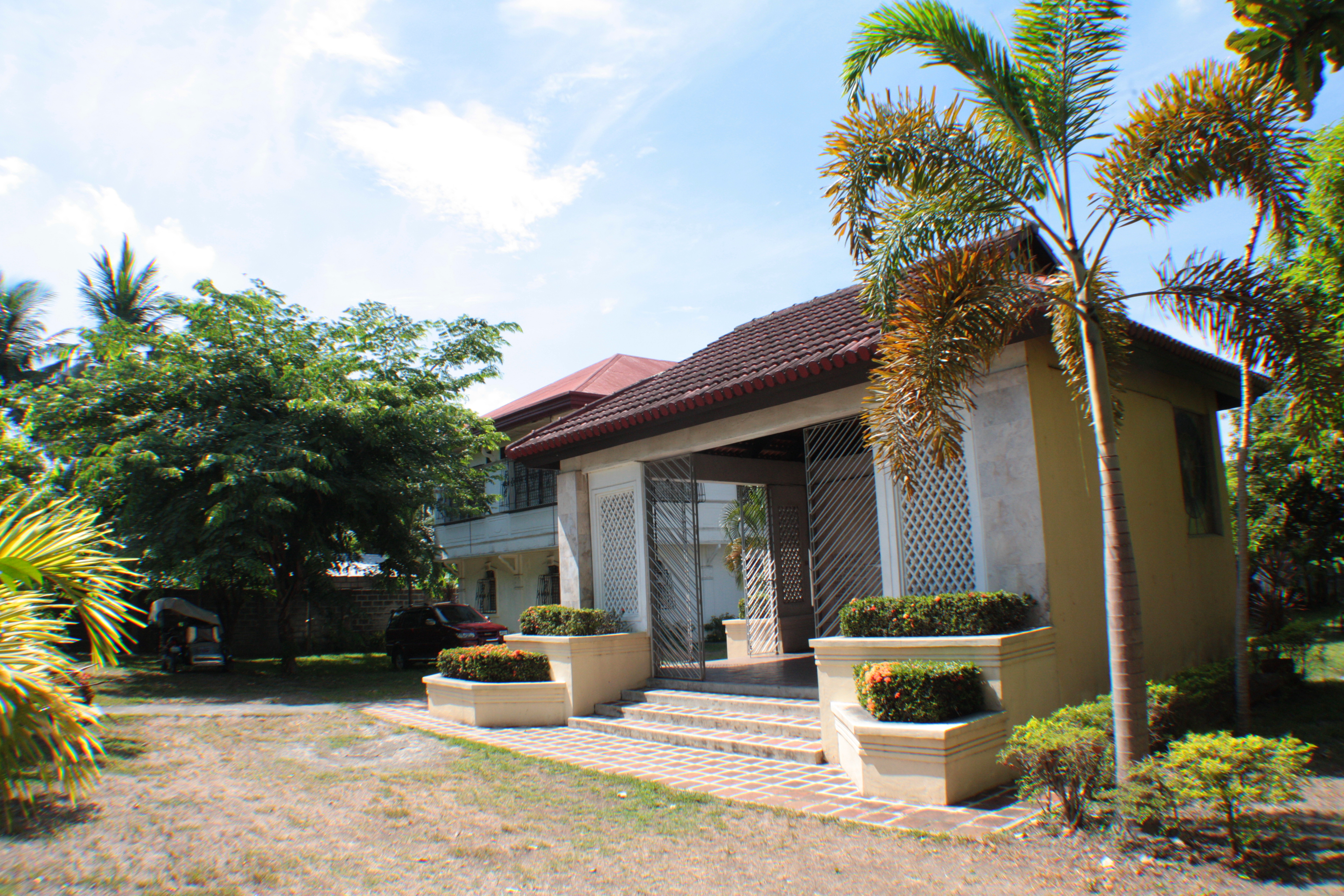
Angkan ni Plaridel Mausoleum

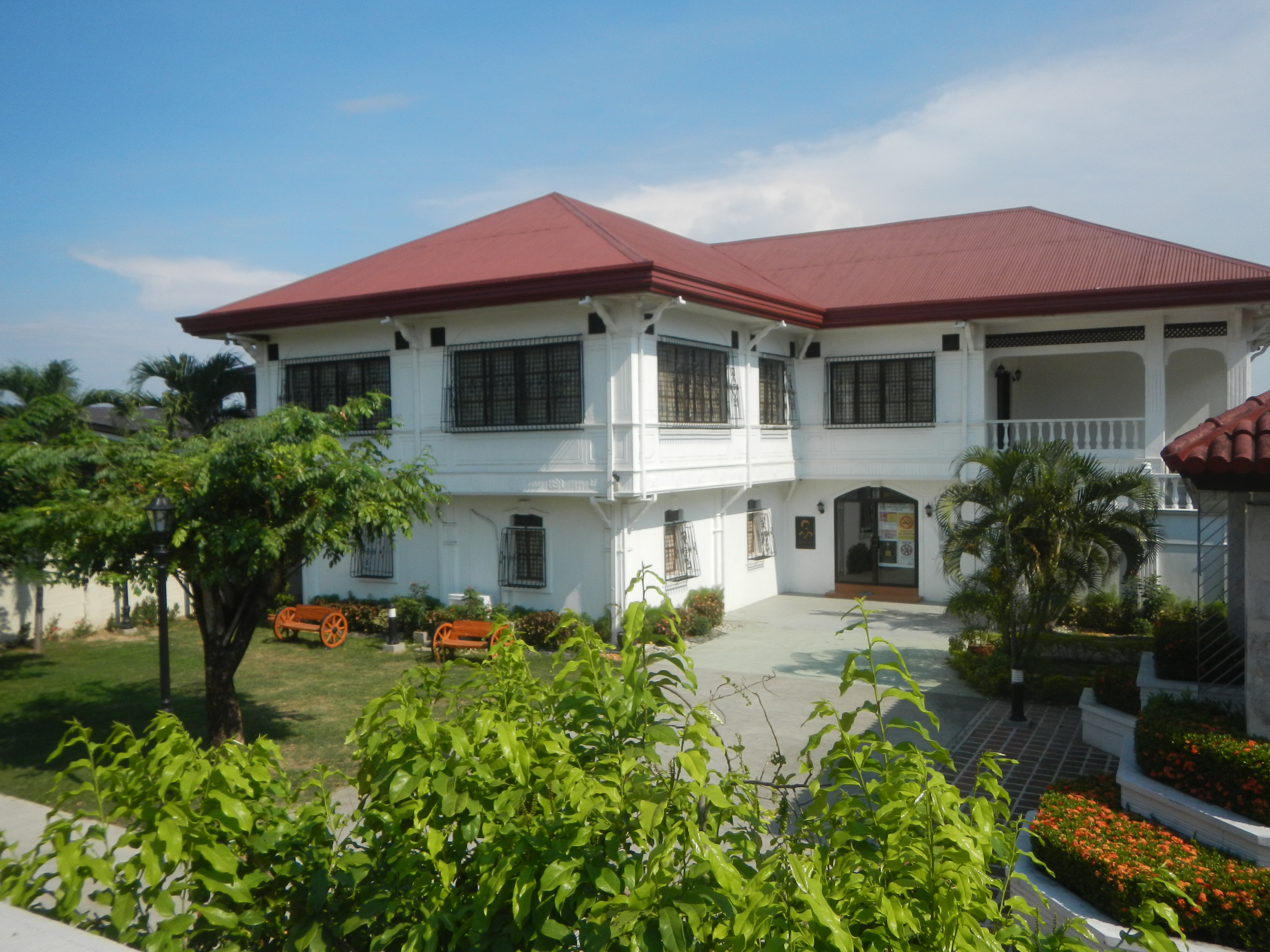
Museo Del Pilar

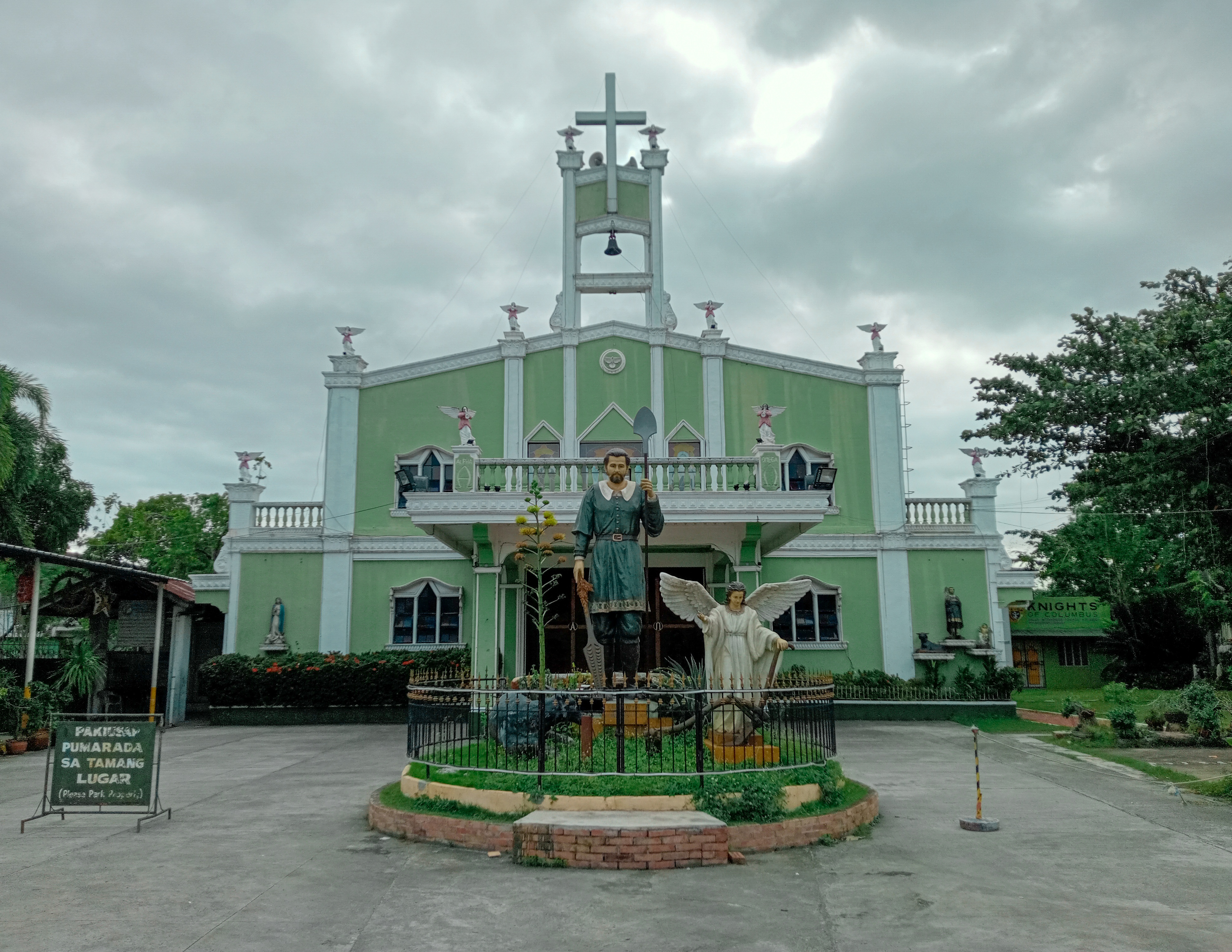
San Isidro Labrador Church, Barangay Bambang

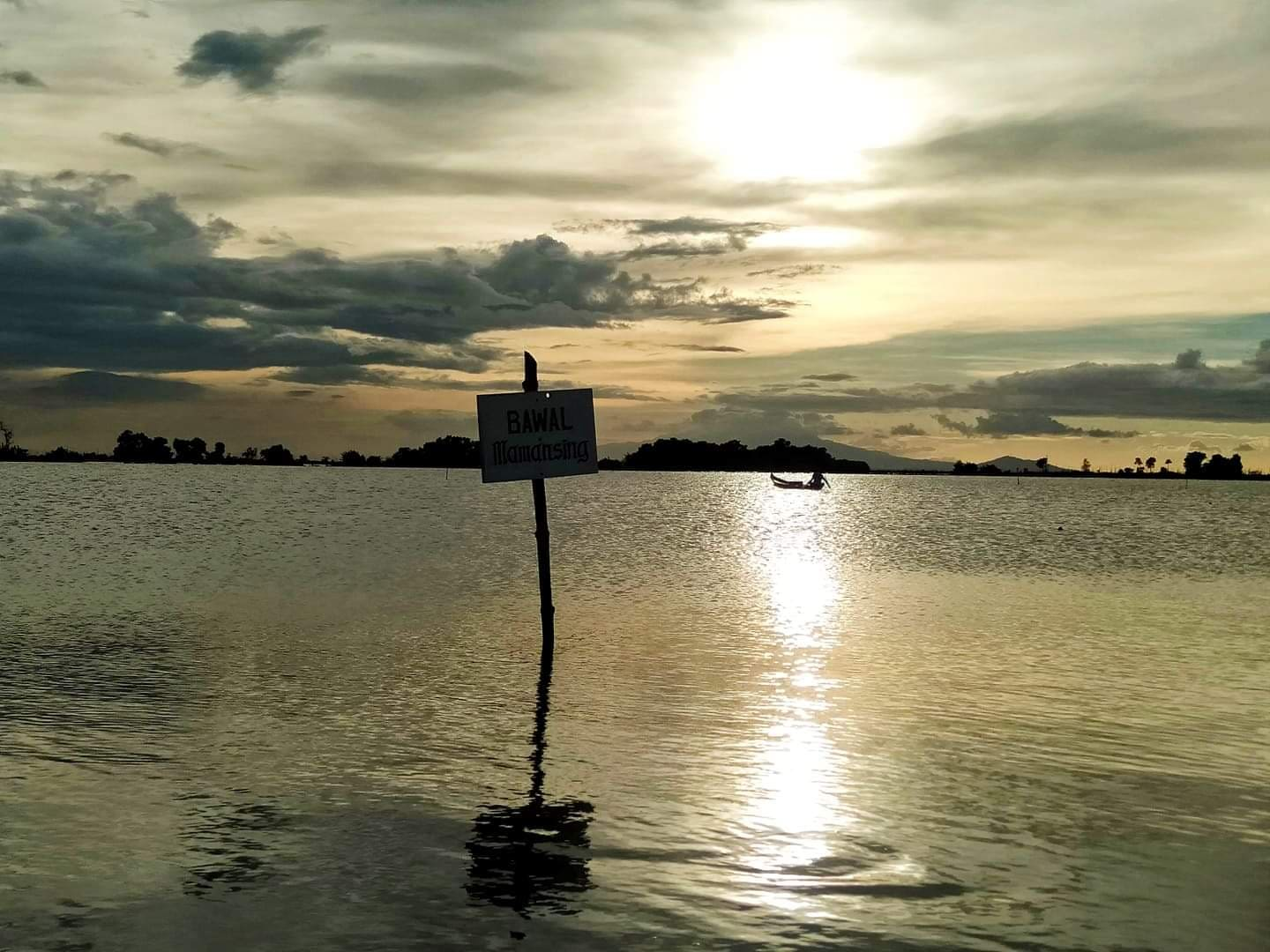
Santa Maria River beside Bagumbayan Street

== See also ==
- List of Cultural Properties of the Philippines in Bulakan, Bulacan

First	Capital of Bulacan; 1578–1901	Succeeded by Malolos
