= Taliptip =

Coordinates: 14°46′N 120°54′E

- Barangay
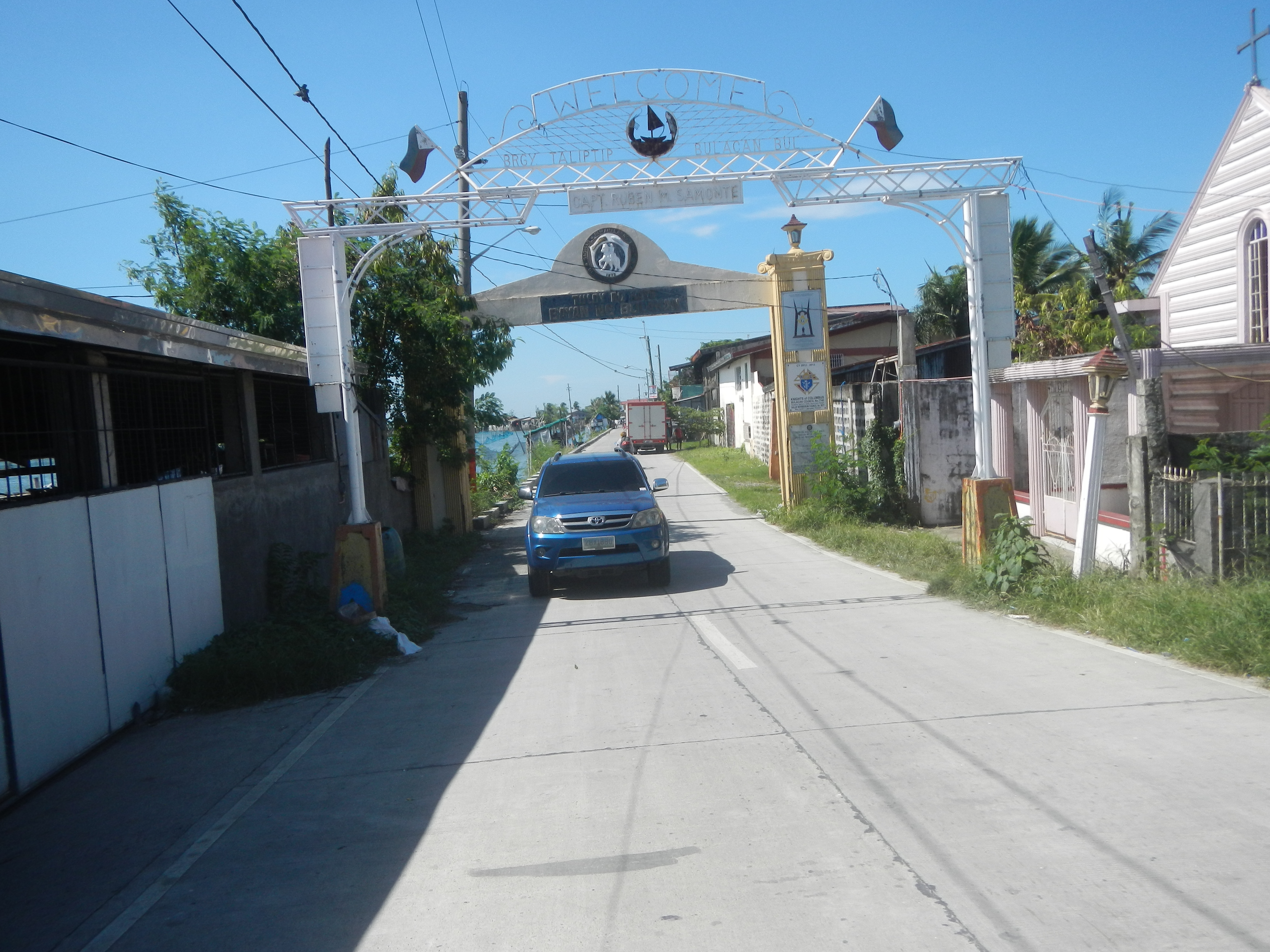
- Welcome arch for both the barangay and the town

- Seal

- Location within Luzon
- Country: Philippines
- Region: Central Luzon
- Province: Bulacan
- District: 1st Legislative District of Bulacan
- Municipality: Bulakan

Government
  - Type: Barangay
  - Barangay captain: Pholly M. Ramos

Population (2020)
  - Total: 5,005
- Time zone: UTC+8 (PST)
- Postal Code: 3017 (Bulakan)
- Area code: 44

Taliptip is an administrative division in western Bulacan, the Philippines. It is an urban barangay of Bulakan and is one of the largest barangays of the city, spanning over a third of Bulakan's total land area. It is noted as the location of the former sitio of Pariahan.

A major part of the proposed New Manila International Airport will be located in the barangay, requiring the relocation of residents in six affected sitios: Bunotan, Camansi, Capol, Dapdap, Kinse, and Pariahan. Several residents have opted to stay in other parts of the province, while others have chosen to return to their home provinces in different parts of Luzon and Visayas.

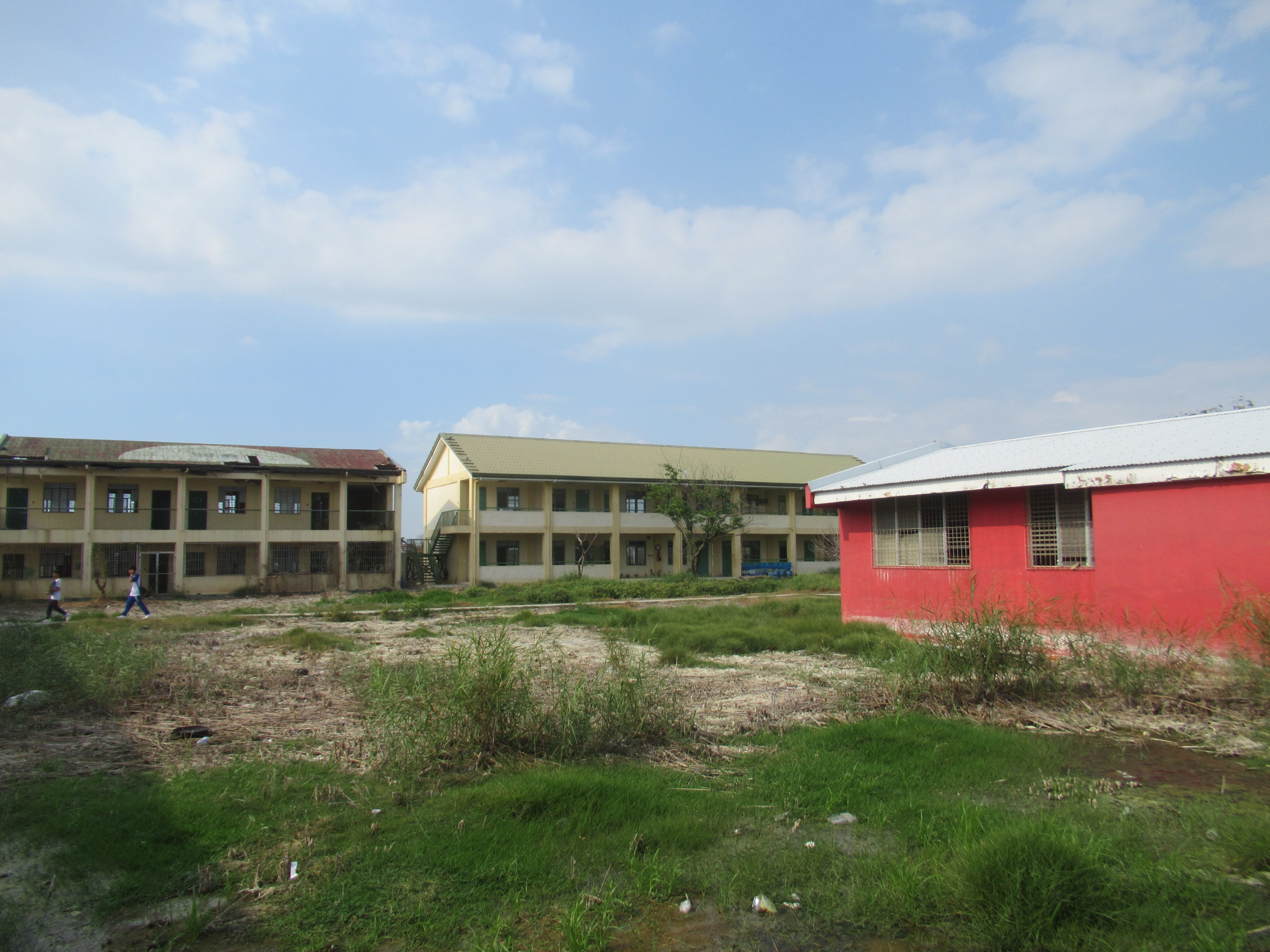
Taliptip National High School

== Submerging of Pariahan ==
The sitio of Pariahan was an island community of more than a hundred families that depended on fishing activity. Considered as the largest sitio of Barangay Taliptip, the sitio suffered land subsidence due to abusive use of groundwater, and the resulting flow of the waters of Manila Bay displaced numerous residents.

Permanent inundation was ensured after rains brought forth by Typhoons Mina (internationally Nanmadol) and Ompong (internationally Mangkhut). As of 2018, only 36 families continued to live in the submerged sitio, whose official status has not yet revoked at the time, and where remnants of a chapel and a school are still visible, protruding out of the floods. Remaining houses are raised on stilts and residents use boats to get around the buildings.

Rosario Mariano, the Municipal Disaster Risk Reduction Management Officer for Bulakan, expressed the urgency of permanent relocation for the residents of the sitio, which is facing the threat of climate change. As of December 2020, all the remaining residents of Pariahan and 10 other sitios of Taliptip have been relocated for the development of New Manila International Airport.

== Demographics ==
Barangay Taliptip has a population of 5,005 people according to the 2020 census, down from a population of 5,490 people in the 2015 census.
