= New Manila International Airport =

Future airport in Bulacan, Philippines

New Manila International Airport Bagong Paliparang Pandaigdig ng Maynila
- Logo
- IATA: none; ICAO: none

Summary
- Airport type: Public
- Owner: Government of the Philippines
- Operator: San Miguel Aerocity Inc.
- Serves: Greater Manila Area
- Location: Barangays Taliptip and Bambang, Bulakan, Bulacan
- Coordinates: 14°44′24″N 120°52′30″E
- Website: www.sanmiguel.com.ph/page/san-miguel-aerocity-inc

Map
- Location in Bulacan Location in Luzon Location in the Philippines

Runways
Direction	Length		Surface
Direction	m	ft	Surface
06L/24R

New Manila International Airport (Note: San Miguel Corporation officially refers to the airport as Manila International Airport.) (Filipino: Bagong Paliparang Pandaigdig ng Maynila), also known as Bulacan International Airport (Paliparang Pandaigdig ng Bulacan), is an international airport under construction on the coastal areas of Bulakan, Bulacan, 35 km (22 mi) north of Manila, the capital of the Philippines. This project aimed at decongesting the existing Ninoy Aquino International Airport (NAIA) in Manila, is undertaken by the San Miguel Corporation (SMC). The coastal airport is projected to be part of township entailing a residential zone, government center, seaport and an industrial zone, which has been legally declared an economic zone and freeport.

== History ==
=== 1945–2017: Multiple false-starts ===
A 1945 plan to build a central national airport on reclaimed land in Manila Bay in northeastern Pasay did not materialise. The land was instead occupied by the Cultural Center of the Philippines Complex and the Financial Center Area of Bay City reclamation.

An airport in Bulacan was first proposed as early as 1972 to replace the aging Manila International Airport (MIA). According to a report by The Manila Times dated May 31, 1972 (only months before Martial law under Ferdinand Marcos), a plan was envisioned to transfer the airport operations within 15 years to a 5,000-hectare (12,000-acre) reclaimed area along the shore of Manila Bay in Bulacan.

The relocation was dependent on House Bill No. 4746, a Malacañang-certified bill introduced by Bulacan Representative Teodulo C. Natividad. The proposed complex was intended to handle both domestic and international flights and would have been renamed the Philippine International Airport (PIA). The Civil Aeronautics Administration (CAA), led by Deputy Civil Aviation Director and officer-in-charge Epifanio B. Reymundo, actively coordinated with Natividad's office for the bill's passage, though the plan ultimately did not materialize at the time.

In 1977, as part of commitments to the Asian Development Bank, the CAA proposed the Manila Reliever Airport project to handle general aviation traffic from Manila International Airport. The proposed site was located in the vicinities of the Pasong-Manga Numero Tres area north of the Canlubang Sugar Estate in Calamba, Laguna.

By early 1980s, Manila International Airport (now Ninoy Aquino International Airport) had become congested and the 2012 plan for secondary airport in Manila proposed by SMC-owned Philippine Airlines was also later shelved.

In May 2011, the Japan International Cooperation Agency (JICA)'s study on air transport needs within the Greater Manila Area, made a submission to the Philippine government that a new airport was "an urgent need" given that the capacity at the existing NAIA was "already almost saturated." In May 2013, the government responded by adopting a dual-use twin-airport system, which entailed the upgrade of NAIA while also expanding capacity at Clark International Airport. In 2015, JICA recommended the construction of a new airport near Sangley Point in Cavite City to the south of Manila Bay. In May 2014, San Miguel Corporation (SMC) proposed a $10-billion international airport project built on reclaimed land in Manila Bay, which was intended to cover the coastal areas of Parañaque and Las Piñas. However, this not happen; a decision later reversed by the administration of the President Duterte in 2016 who favored multiple airports for the Greater Manila Area.

=== 2016–2020: Bulacan airport plan approved ===
Consequently, 2017 SMC proposal to build a new airport north of Manila Bay under BOT scheme, was approved in 2018 by the government, and underwent a Swiss challenge where other prospective companies competed against the original project proponent SMC. On 18 September 2019, SMC was awarded the ₱734-billion Bulacan airport deal, under which the airport will be fully owned by the Philippine government under the BOT-scheme. On 1 September 2020, Congress approved House Bill No. 7507, granting the San Miguel Aerocity a 50-year congressional franchise "to establish a domestic and international airport", and to "develop an adjacent airport city".

=== 2020–2028: Phase-1 construction ===
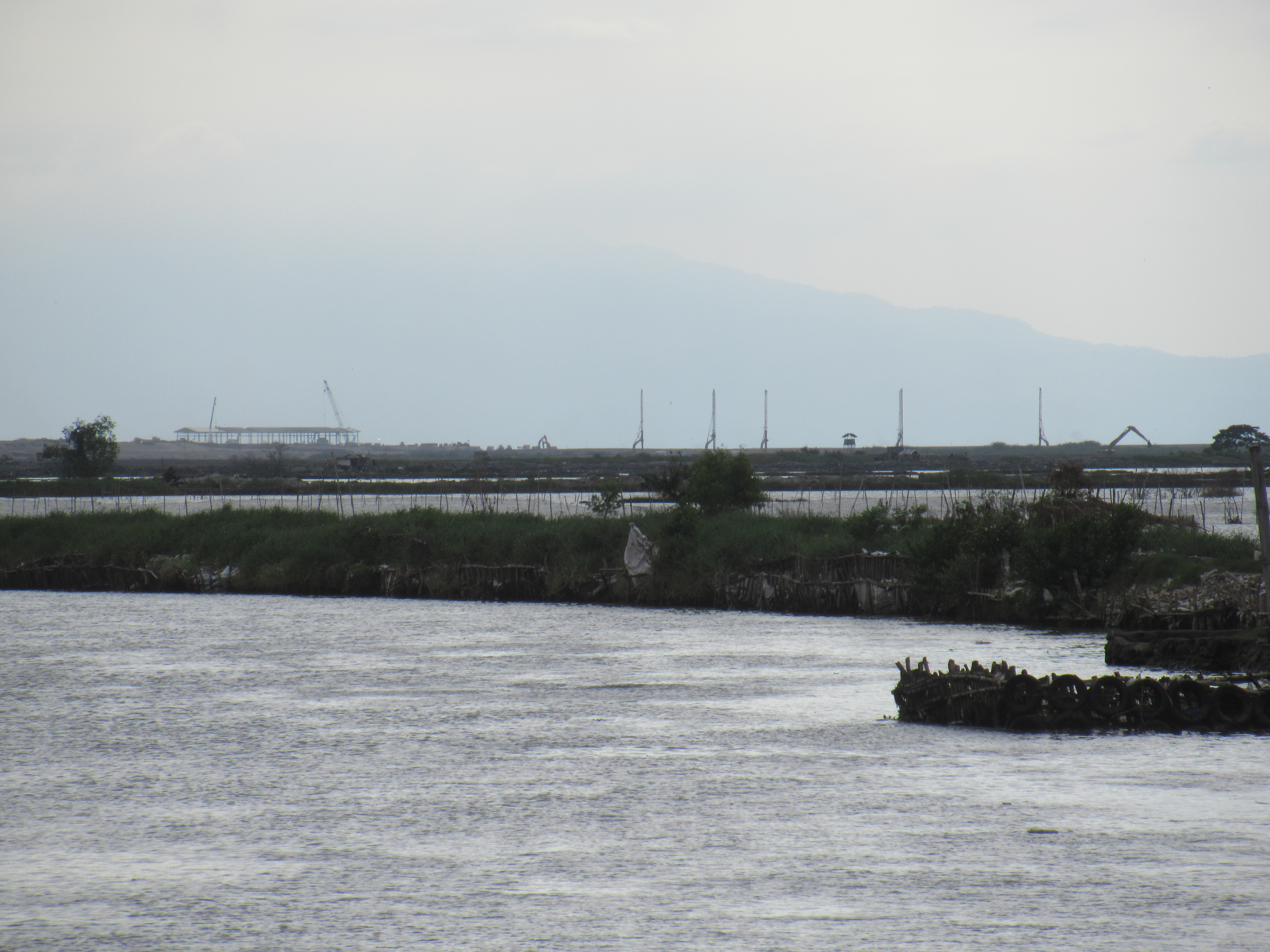
Dredging by Boskalis in November 2022.

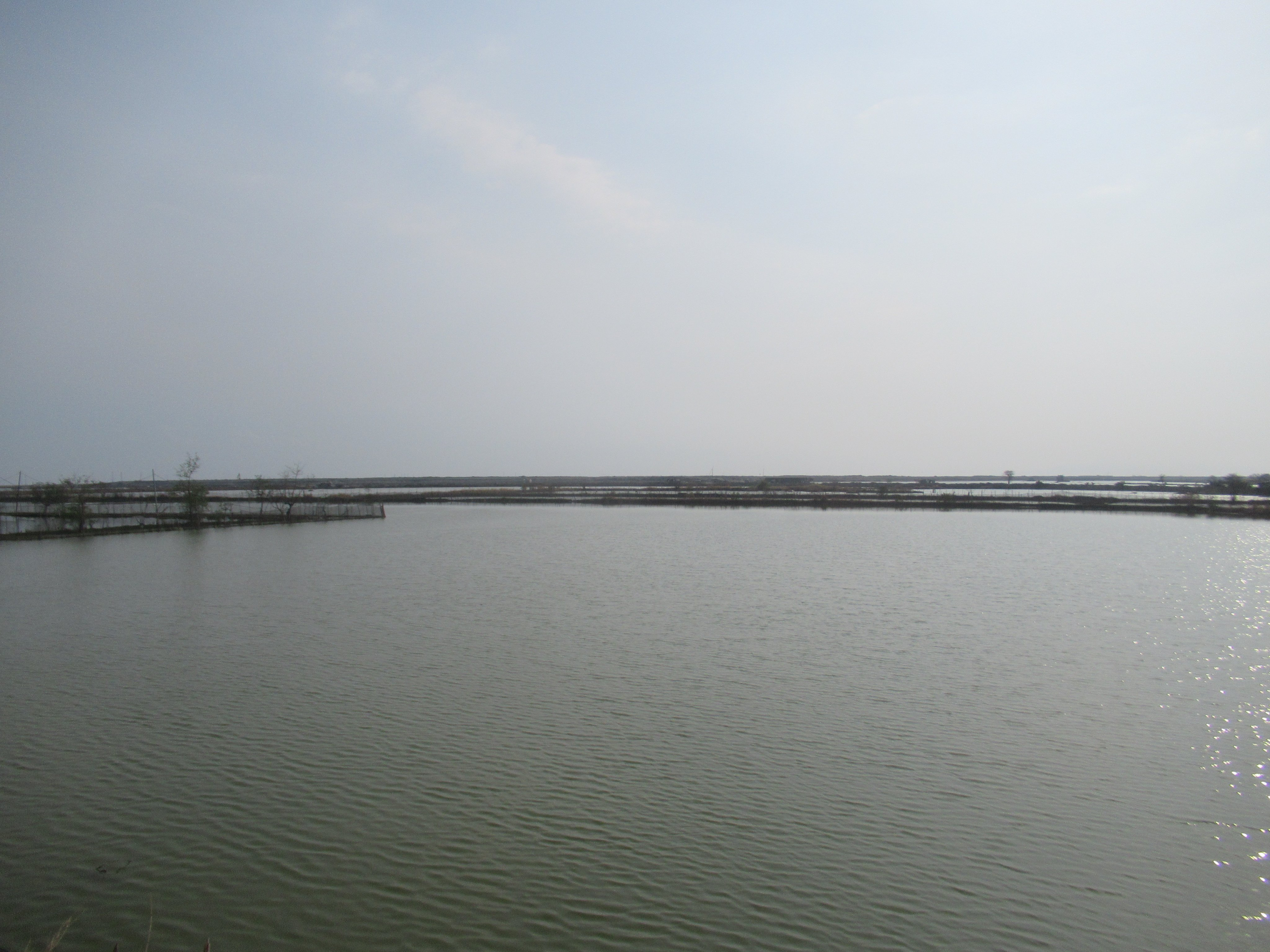
Bulacan Airport construction at Taliptip-Bambang area, c. March 2024.

In 2019, SMC contracted three international firms, Groupe ADP Ingénierie, Meinhardt Group and Jacobs Engineering Group (the same builders behind Changi Airport, Hartsfield–Jackson Atlanta International Airport, and Charles de Gaulle Airport) for the design ad construction.

On October 14, 2020, the groundbreaking of the new airport began, and the construction of the phase-1 began on 18 March 2022 which includes the two runways and the terminal buildings of the new international airport. Royal Boskalis, Dutch company contracted for the dredging of 1,700 hectares (4,200 acres) site for the new airport, commenced the preparatory work in 2021 and completed the land development in 2024.

During SMC's annual stockholders' meeting in June 2026, CEO Ramon Ang stated that the construction of the airport's first runway in Bulacan remains on track for completion by 2028, and could potentially be delivered ahead of schedule. However, Ang noted that other vital phases of the development, specifically the passenger terminal and the logistics center, may face delays and take longer to complete due to extensive land development and preparation requirements.

The project has faced delays because of difficulties in sourcing adequate sandy soil needed for landfilling and runway construction. The company has also faced competition for sand from other projects, including reclamation activities in Manila Bay. Ang previously said the delay was caused by the lack of suitable filling material rather than slow construction, and the company is subject to penalties for failing to meet the agreed timeline.

==== Environmental impact mitigation measures ====
Since 2019, several groups had been raising concerns about the environmental impact of the project, such as the increased risk of flooding and impact on the adjacent mangrove forests. SMC responded with a mitigation plan, launched its skills livelihood and relocation training for the affected residents, undertook award-winning 40-hectare (99-acre) "Saribuhay sa Dampalit" Biodiversity Offset Program in Malolos in Bulacan, a site which is stopover for wader bird migration along East Asian–Australasian Flyway and a natural flood protection sink-area.

== Ground transportation ==
The airport is planned to be connected to several major road and rail networks across Metro Manila and Central Luzon through dedicated tollways and mass transit linkages:

=== Road ===
- Northern Access Link Expressway (NALEX): A planned 136.4-kilometer (84.8 mi) expressway system divided into two phases. Phase 1 connects the airport to the Metro Manila Skyway Stage 3 in Caloocan, while Phase 2 extends north to Tarlac City. The project concession was awarded to SMC.
- Marilao Access Link Expressway (MALEX): A proposed expressway designed to connect the airport directly to the North Luzon Expressway (NLEX) via an interchange in Marilao, Bulacan.

=== Rail ===
There are currently no finalized plans for direct rail access to the airport. SMC has proposed several extensions under MRT Line 7, including a link extending from its terminus in San Jose del Monte to the airport. Although these unsolicited proposals were previously granted Original Proponent Status by the Department of Transportation, the rail project remains in the conceptual planning stage.

== See also ==
- List of airports in the Greater Manila Area
  - Clark International Airport
  - Ninoy Aquino International Airport
  - Sangley Point Airport
  - Subic Bay International Airport
