= Bulacan (disambiguation) =

Bulacan may refer to places in the Philippines:

- Bulacan province
- Bulakan municipality
- Bulacan River
