= Bustos Dam =

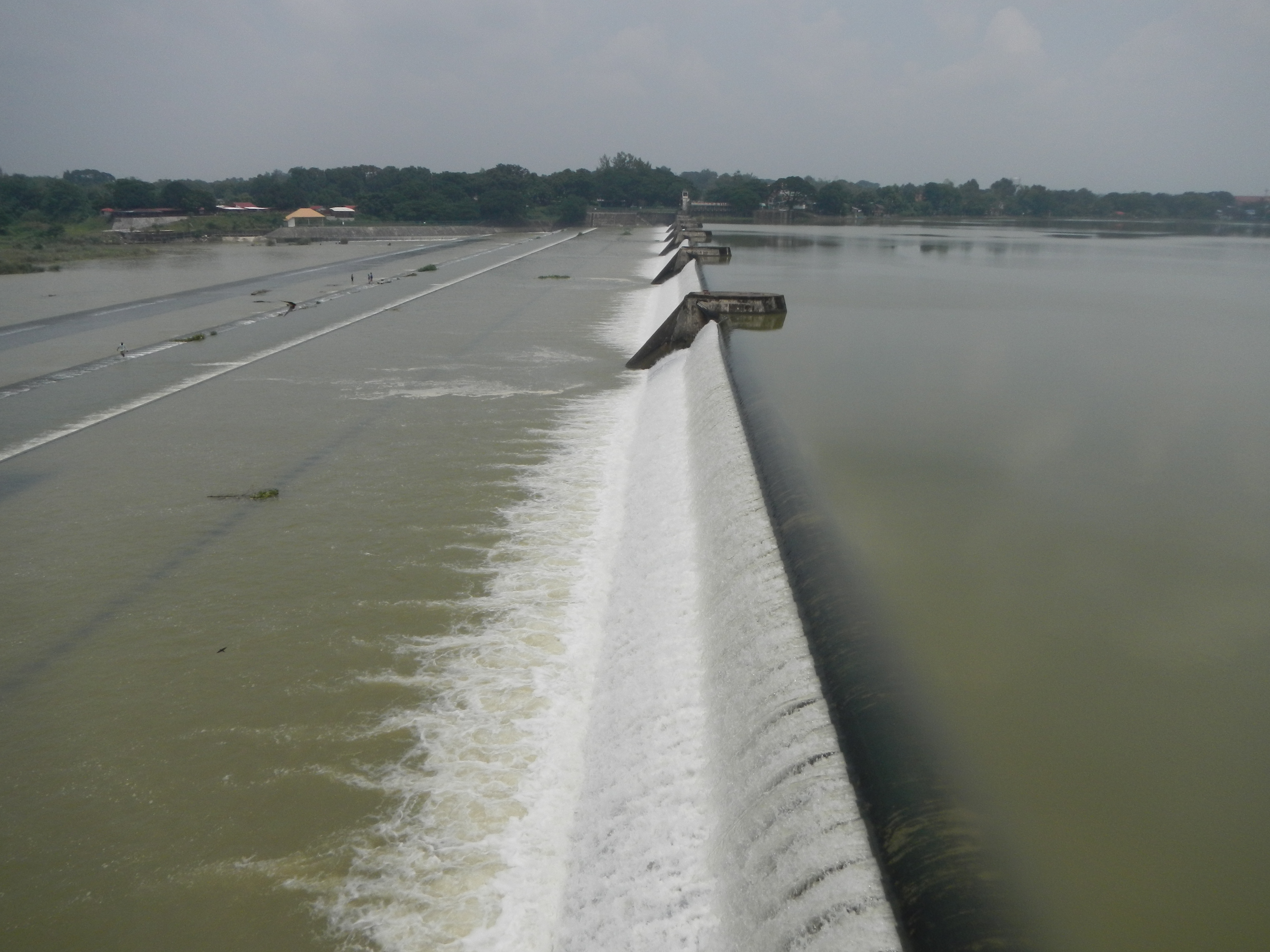
- View from the Control house

- Location in Bulacan Location in Luzon Location in the Philippines
- Official name: Bustos Dam; Angat Afterbay Regulator Dam
- Location: Bustos, Bulacan, Philippines
- Coordinates: 14°57′25″N 120°57′17″E

Dam and spillways
- Type of dam: Irrigation Dam
- Impounds: Angat River

Reservoir
- Creates: Bustos Dam Reservoir
- Total capacity: 17×10^{6} m^{3} (600×10^{6} cu ft)
- Catchment area: 781 km^{2} (302 sq mi)

Bustos Dam, also known as Angat Afterbay Regulator Dam, is a small irrigation dam at Bustos, Bulacan is often mistaken by the locals as Angat Dam since it is located close to the nearby town of Angat. The project is located at Barangay Tibagan, Bustos, Bulacan, served by the Angat River. The main dam is about 18 meters above sea level. Among the 2.5-meter high, six-span dam's main features are easily deflatable and inflatable rubber body, resistance to sedimentation, economical and having auto-deflation system.

== History ==
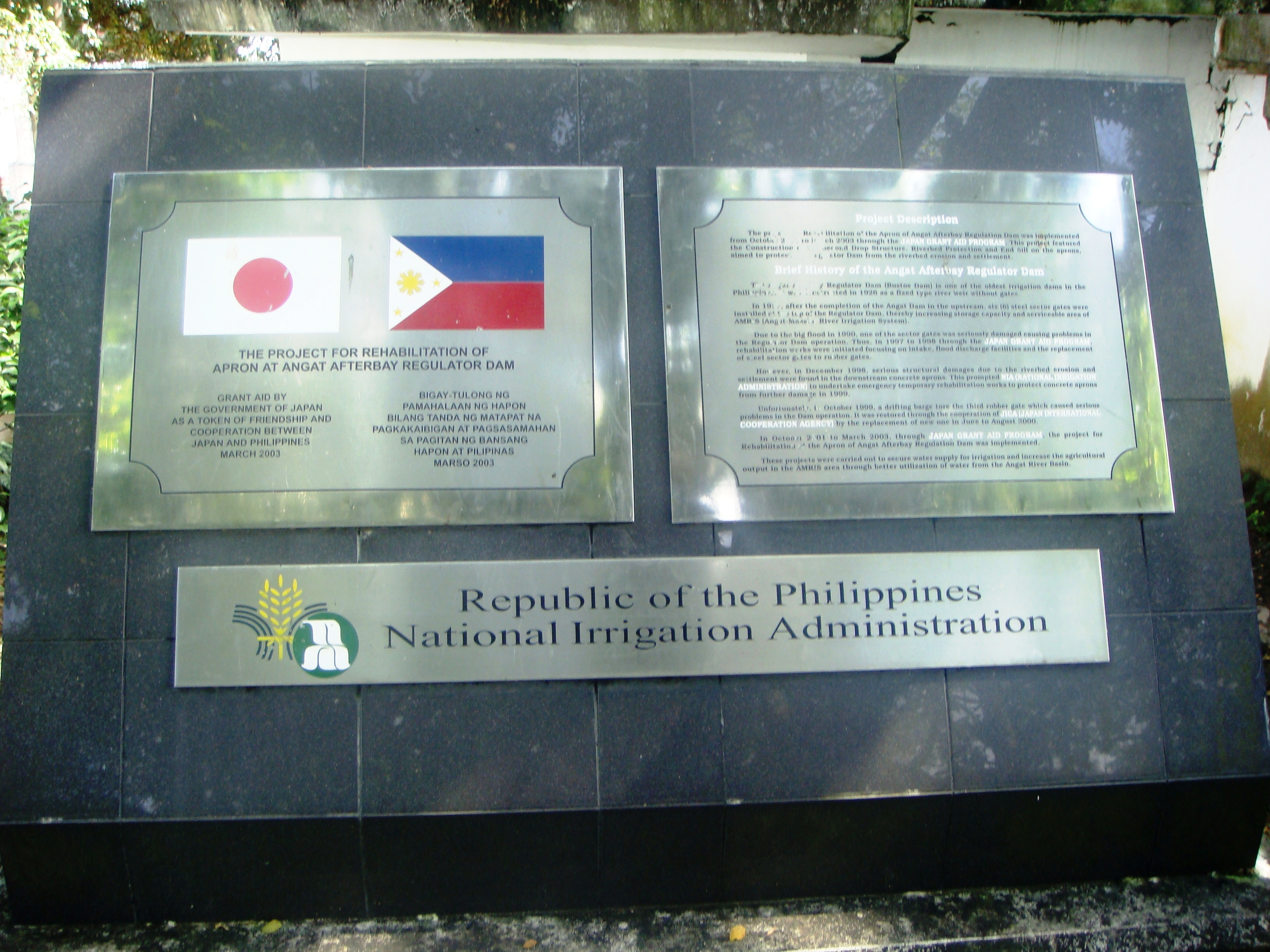
Historical marker: Rehabilitation of Apron at the Dam.

Built in 1926, 50 kilometers upstream from the Bustos Dam as a fixed type river weir without gates, the AARD, Angat Afterbay Regulator Dam (commonly known as Bustos Dam) is the longest rubber dam in Asia at 79 meters and the second largest in the world. It has coordinates of 14°57'25"N 120°57'15"E serving nearby cities: Real, Quezon, Rodriguez (Montalban), Rizal, Antipolo City, Rizal.

In 1967, steel sector gates were installed on top of the regulator dam for the purpose of generating irrigation water, power supply and domestic water supply.

== Rehabilitation ==
With its construction, the Bustos Dam's height was increased by 2.5 meters and later renamed Angat Afterbay Regulator Dam, increasing the service area of the Angat-Maasim Rivers Irrigation System (AMRIS), which operates the AARD from 25,000 hectares in 1927 to 31,485 hectares in 20 towns in Bulacan and Pampanga benefitting 20,562 farmers.

The series of typhoons from 1968 to the early part of 1980 was damaging to the dam whose Bay 1 sector gate finally gave way in September 1990 after typhoon "Iriang" carried away the structure 250 meters downstream from its original post. The agency has undertaken temporary rehab works in the dam using their own budget and through funding assistance from the World Bank.

The present dam was rehabilitated by Kurimoto, LTD., Osaka, Japan, manufacturing date, as of May, 1997.

It has Washed Out, Intake, Sluice and Roller Gates sets. Its clear spans are 4.6% 1.53 meters. Its gate (opening) heights are 4.5 and 1.0 meters. The weights of the leaves are 5.4 and 1.0 tons. The operating speed is 0.3 m./ min.

In 2001, the Japan International Cooperation Agency (JICA) approved a P500-million grant-in aid to the government for the repair and improvement of the Angat Afterbay Regulatory Dam (AARD) in Bustos, Bulacan.

The National Irrigation Administration (NIA) was to bid out the P1-billion contract for the rehabilitation of the Bustos Dam in the 3rd quarter of 2014.

On May 1, 2025, one of the dam's gates burst due to high temperatures, prompting flood warnings in downstream areas of Bulacan.

== Gallery ==
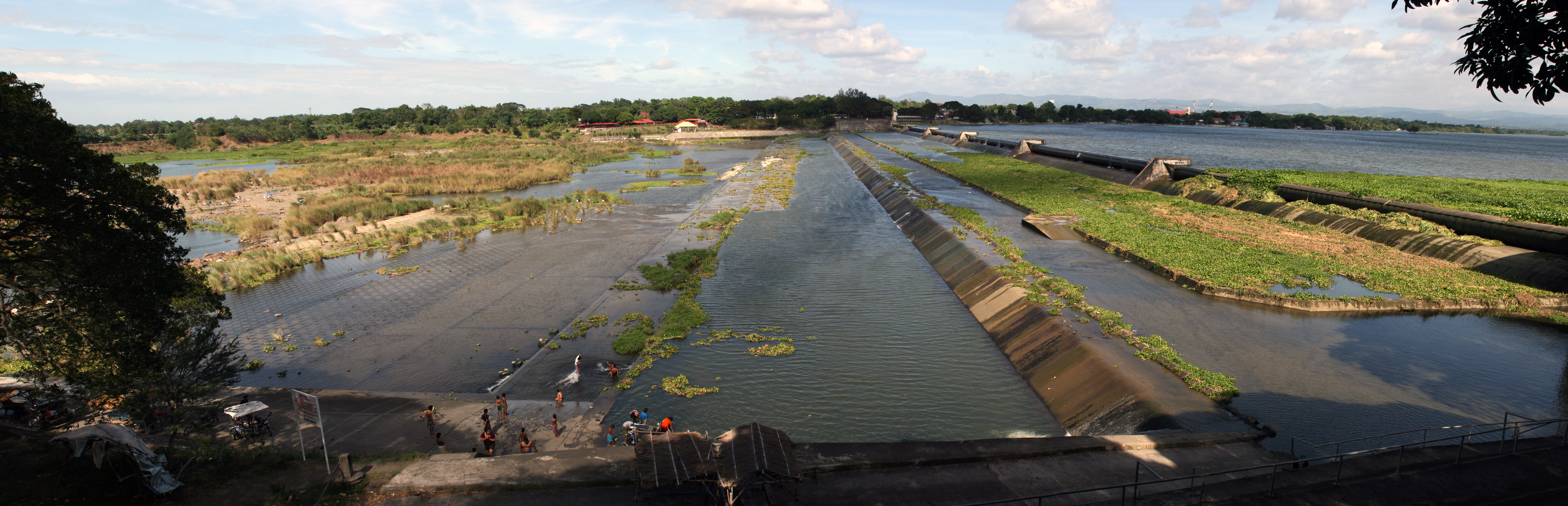
Panoramic View from view deck

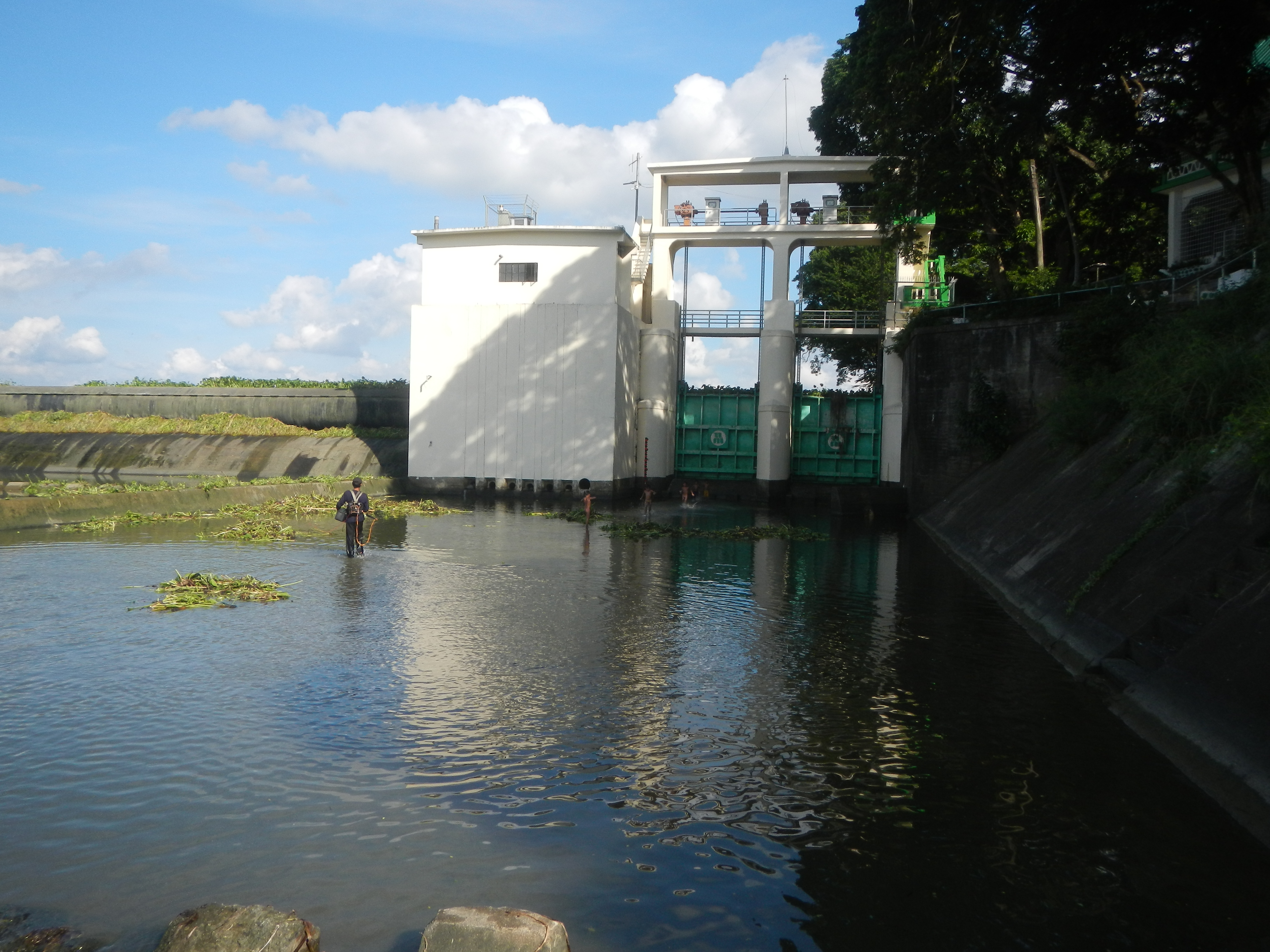
Control house (with the green gate)

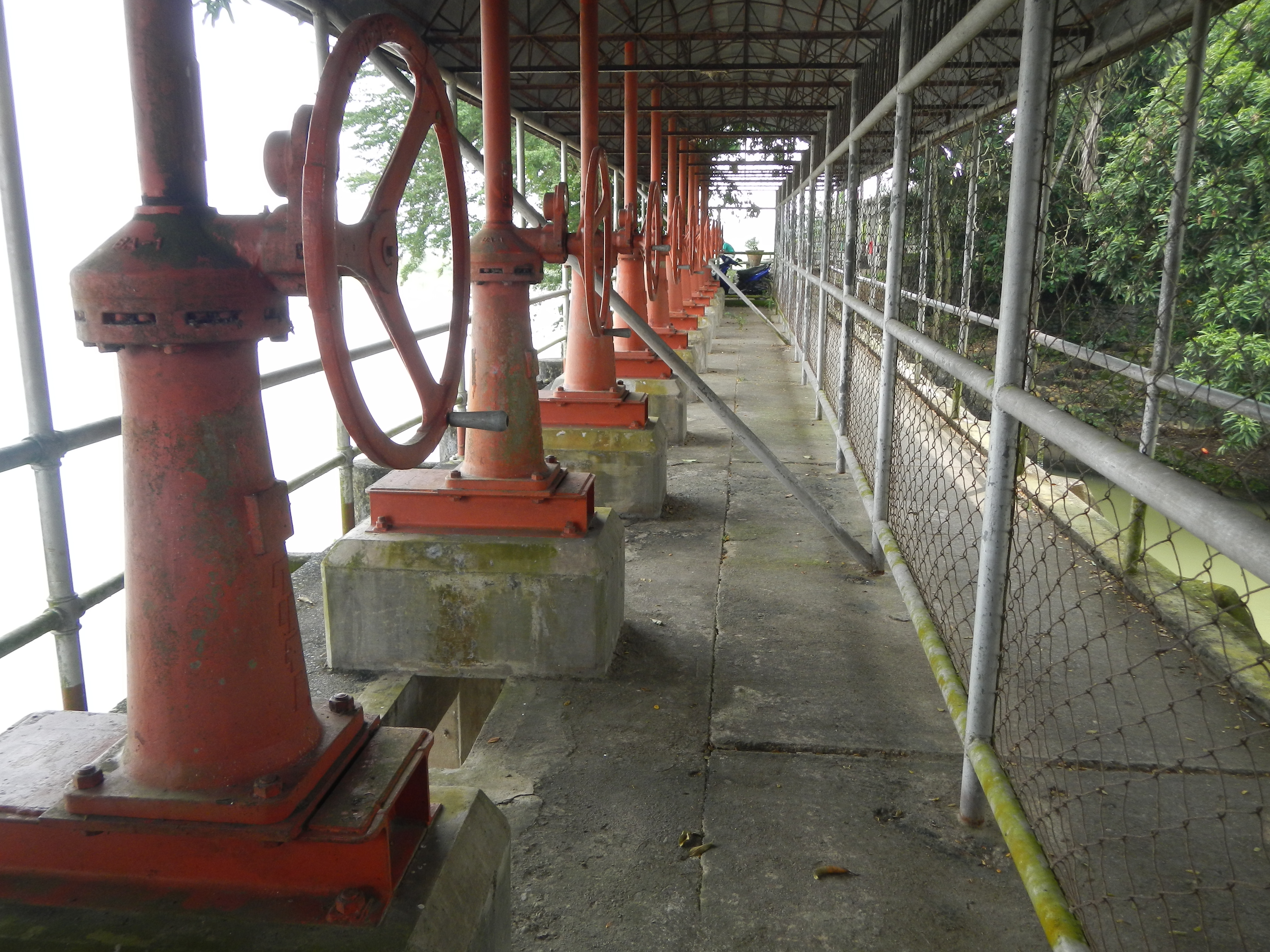
Intake gate

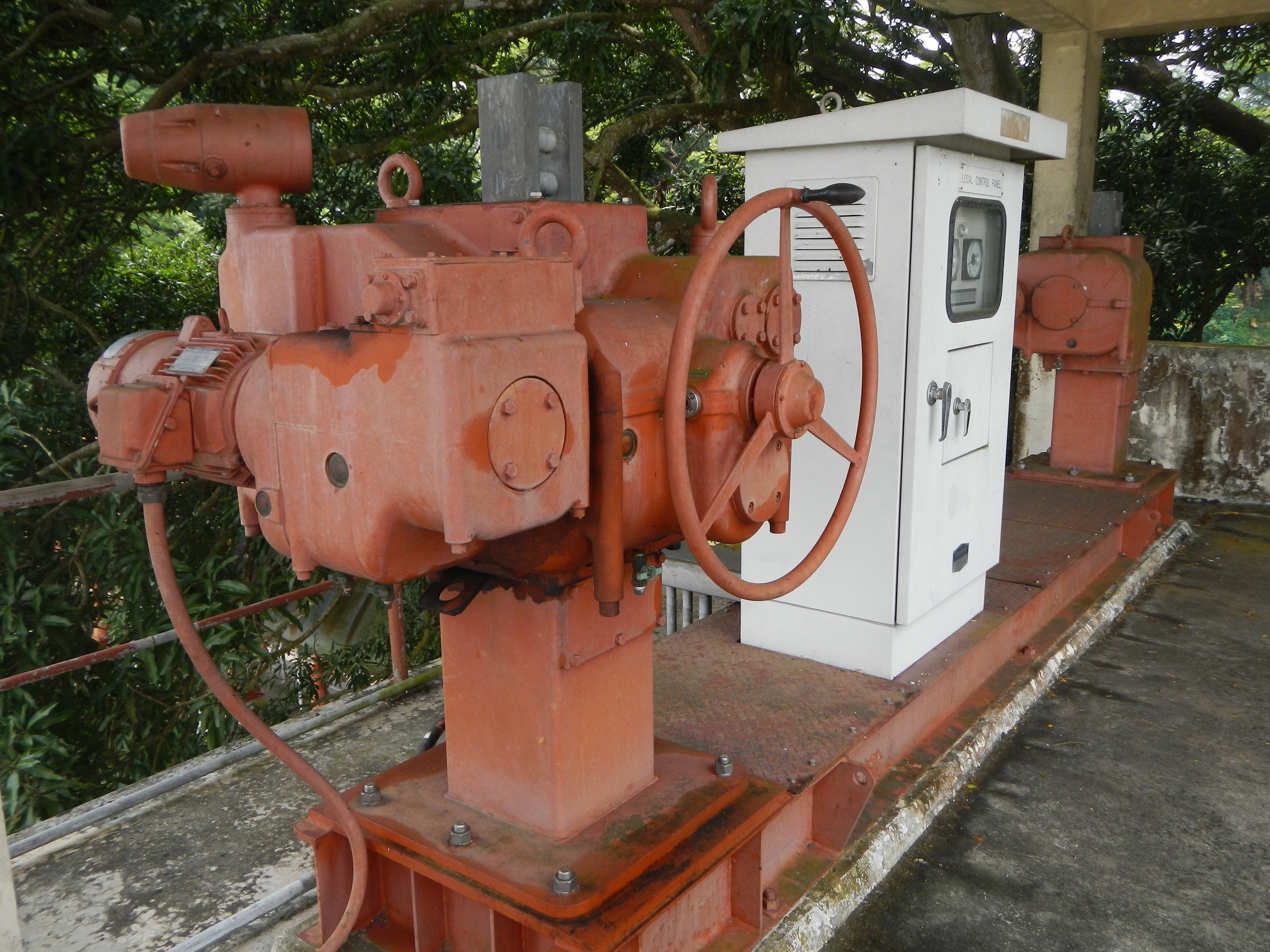
Control panel (engineering)

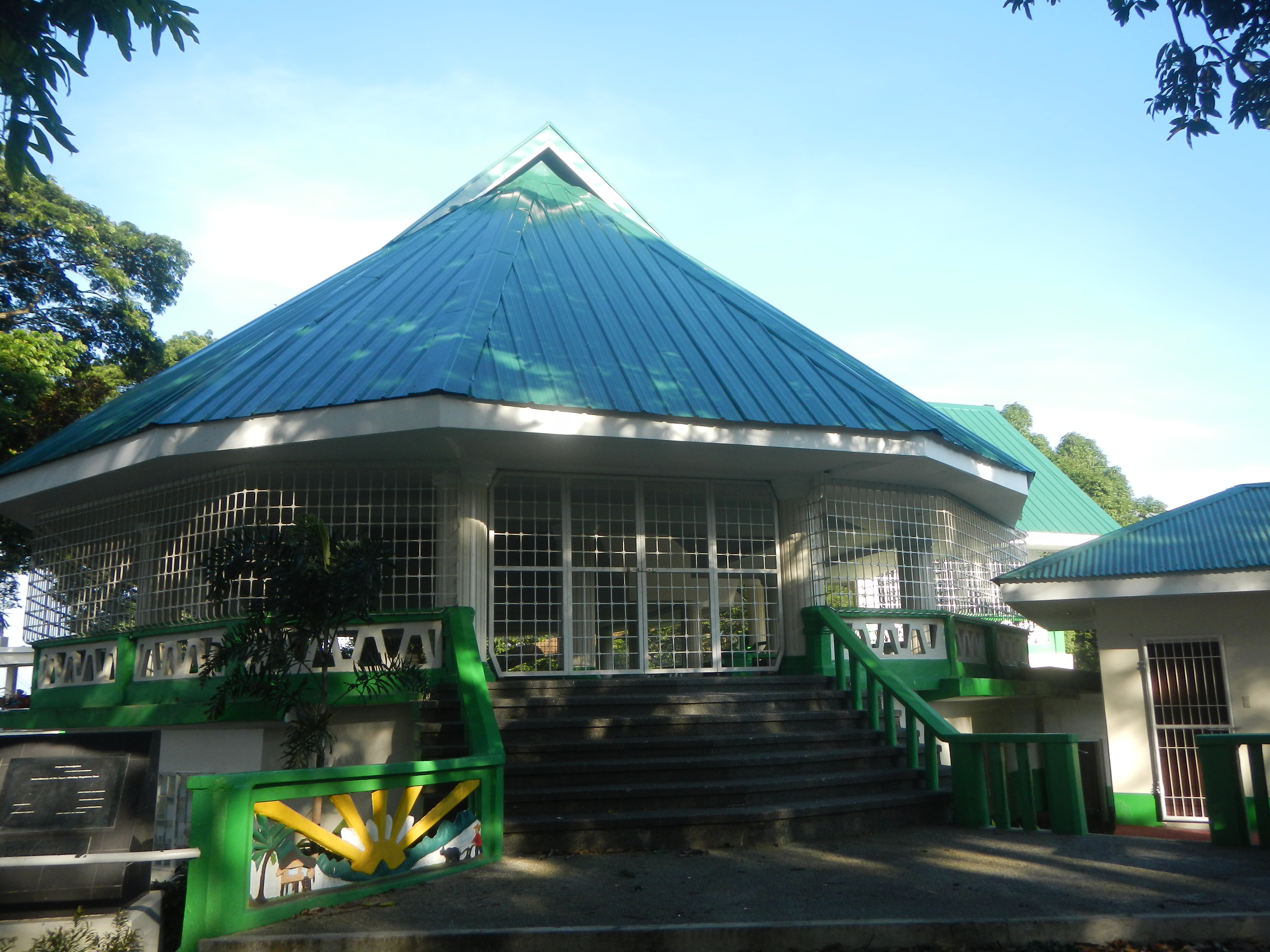
Pavilion 2nd floor

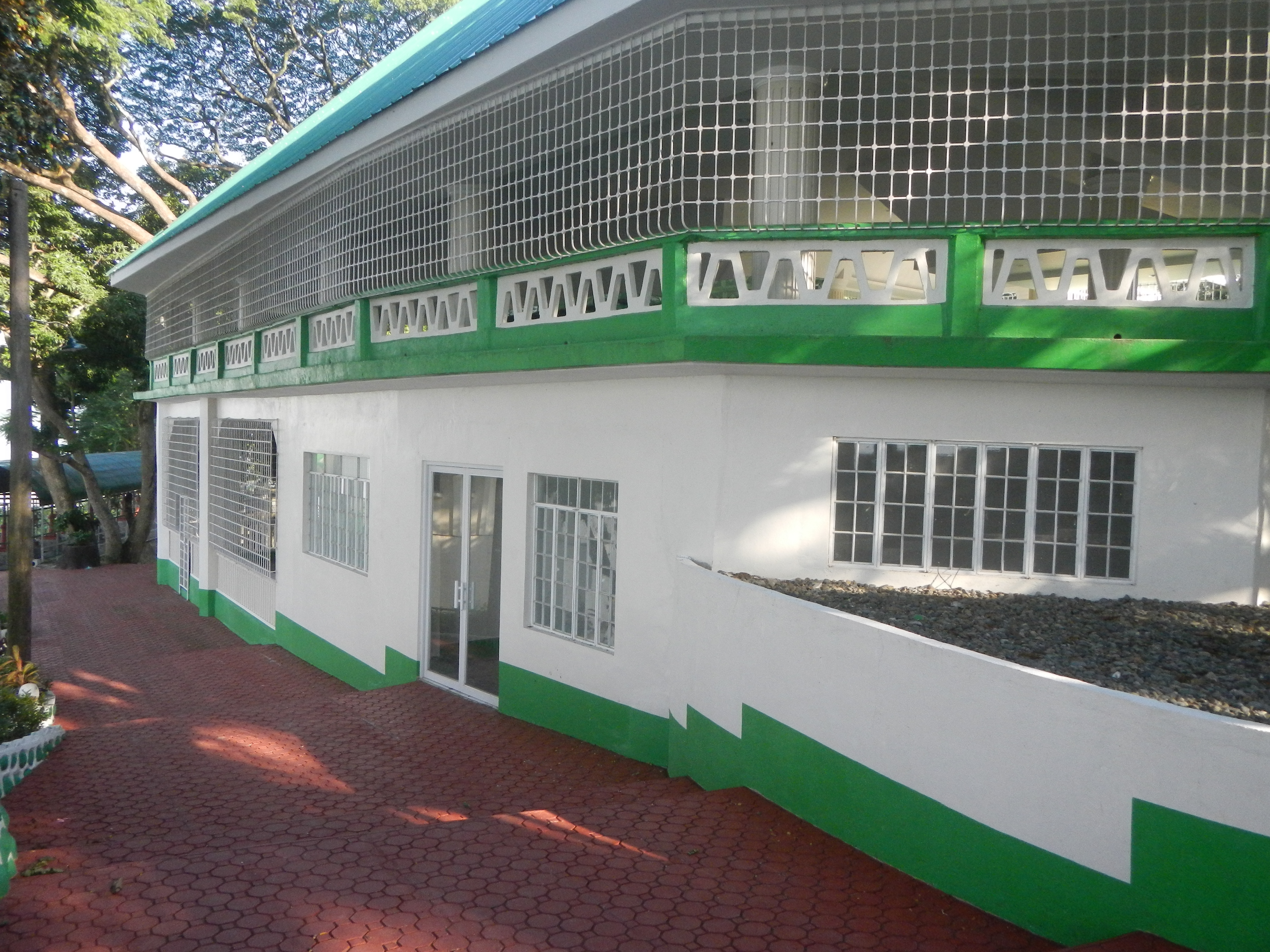
Pavilion ground floor

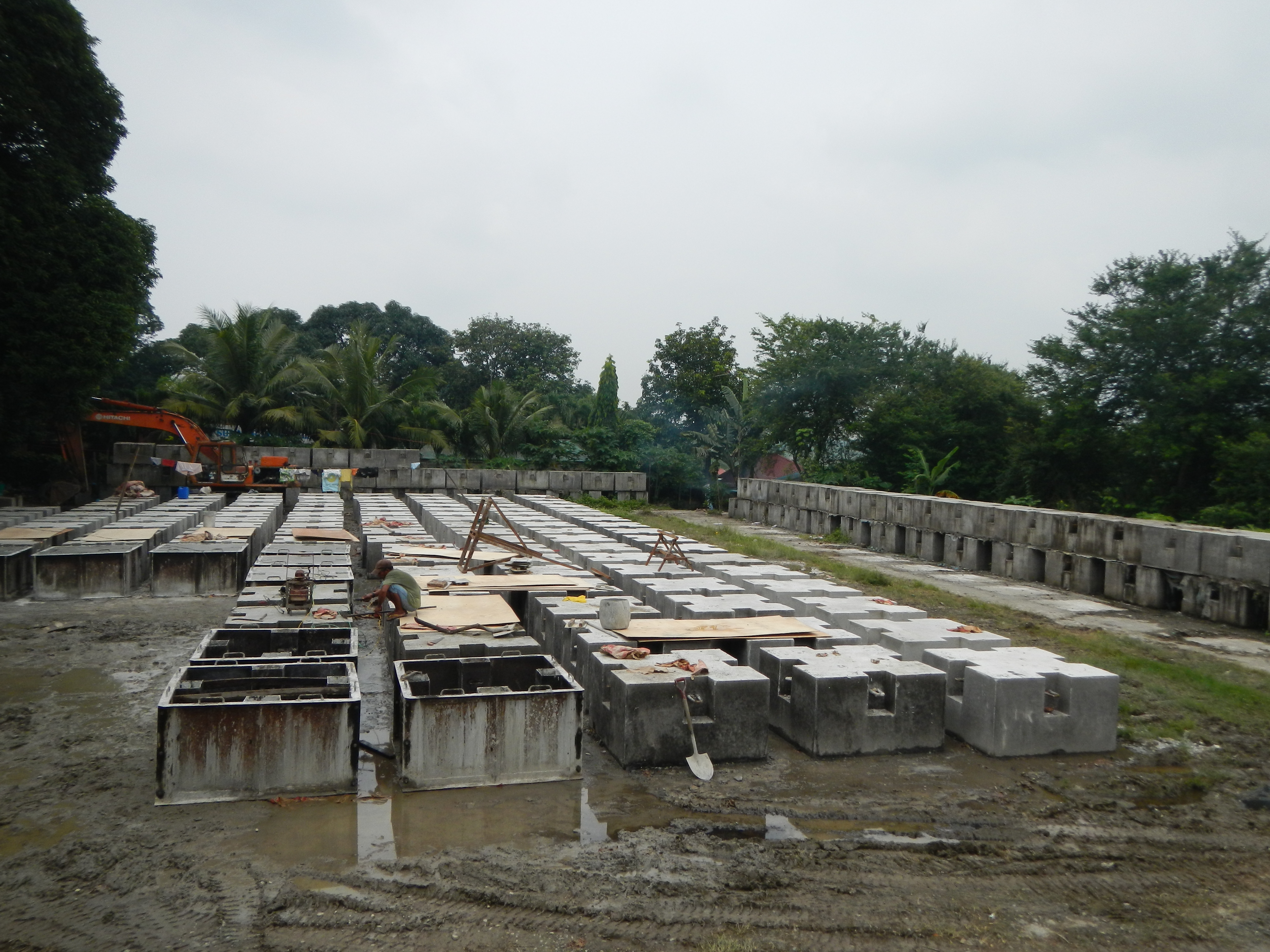
Precast concrete elements for flooring

== See also ==
- Water supply and sanitation in the Philippines
- Energy in the Philippines
