= Bustos, Bulacan =

Municipality in Bulacan, Philippines

Bustos
- Municipality
- Municipality of Bustos
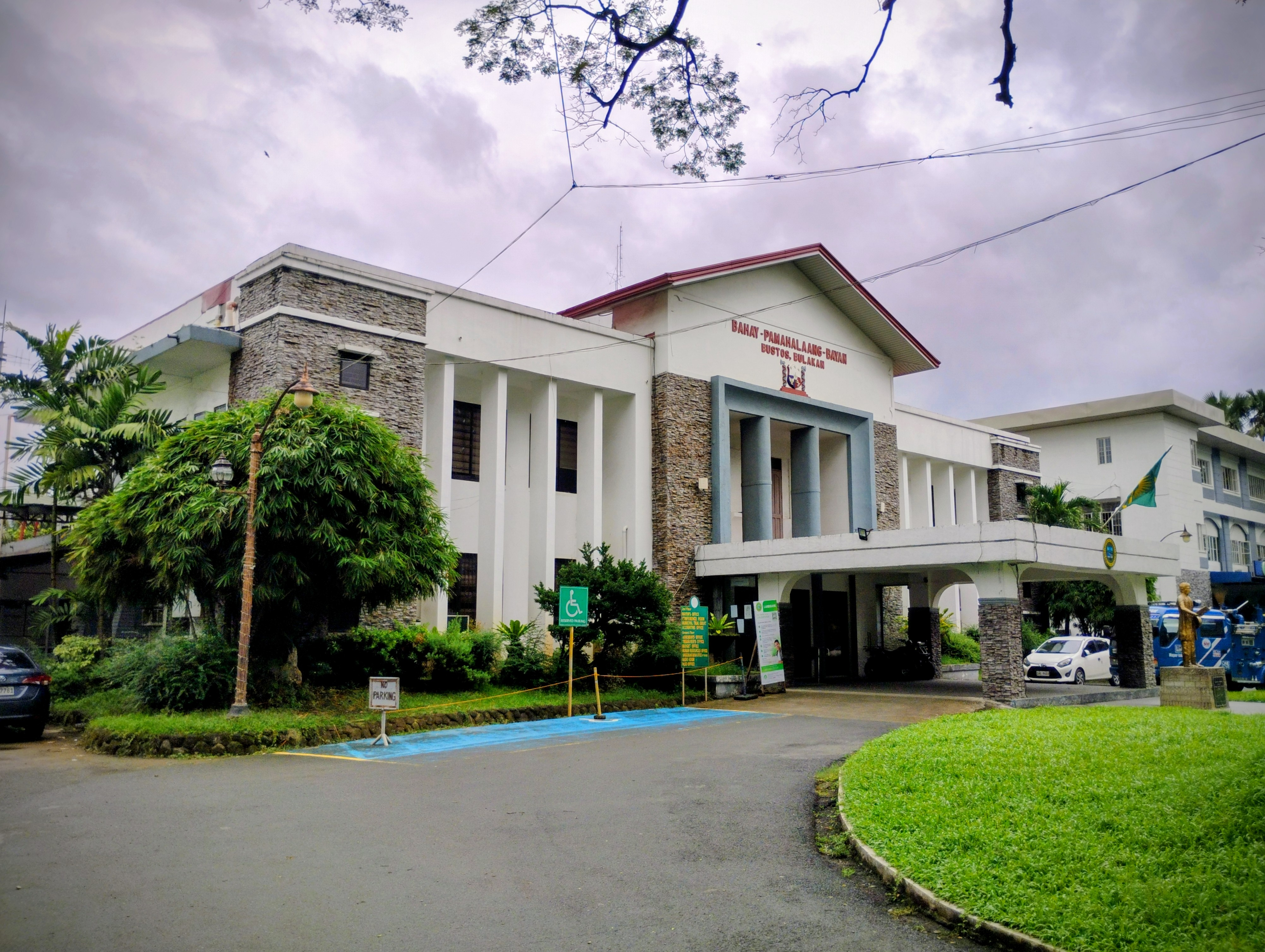
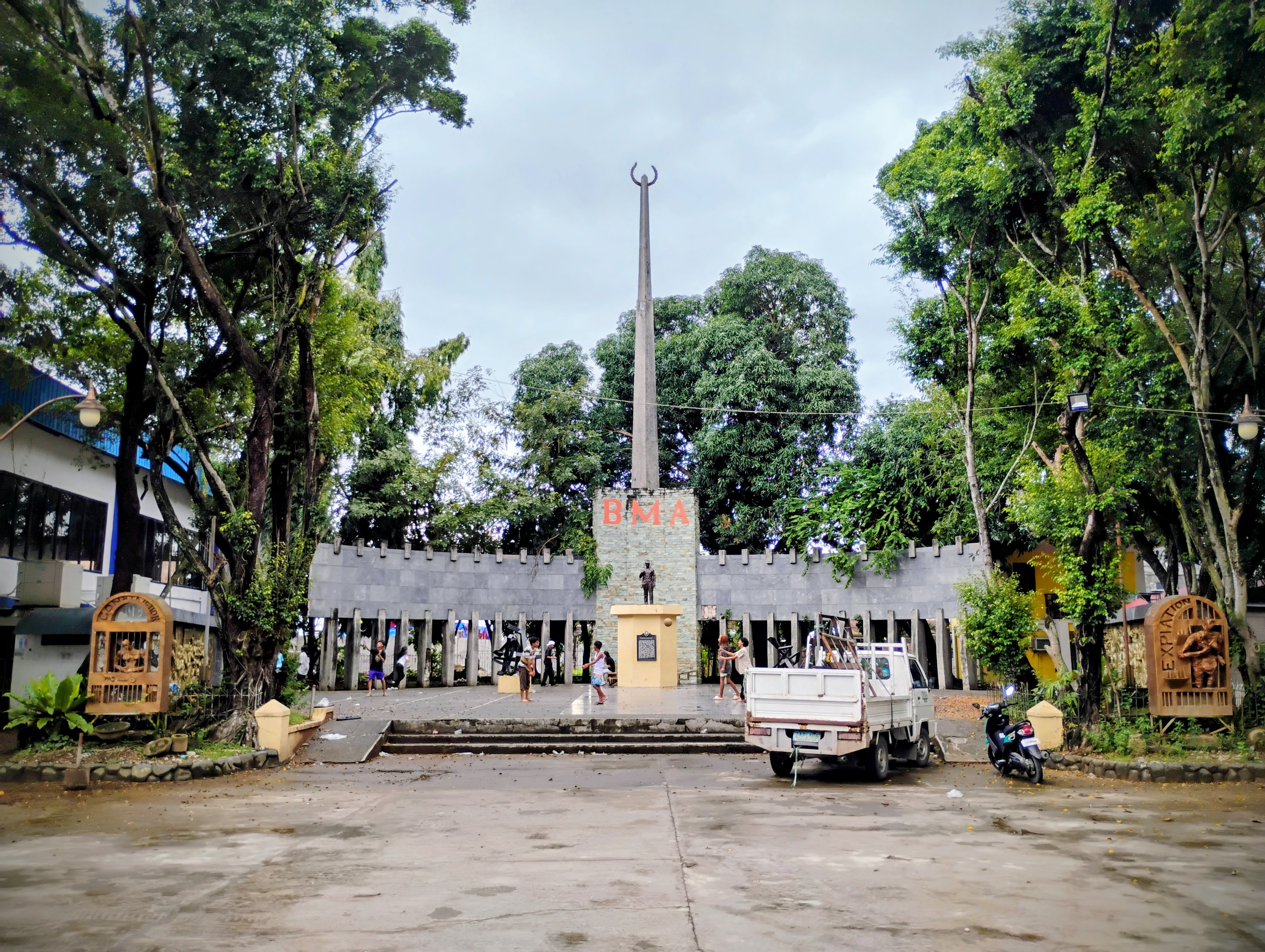
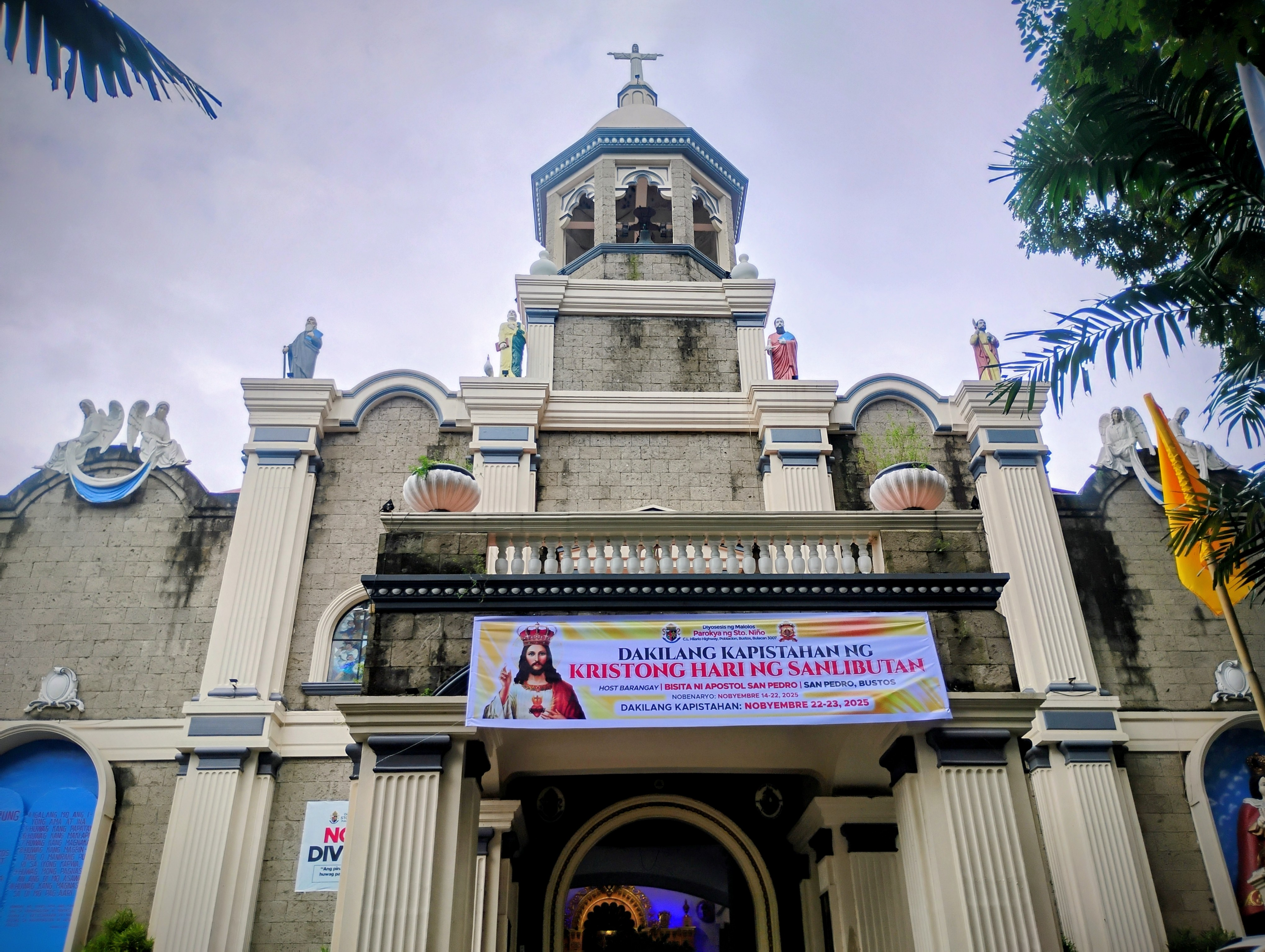
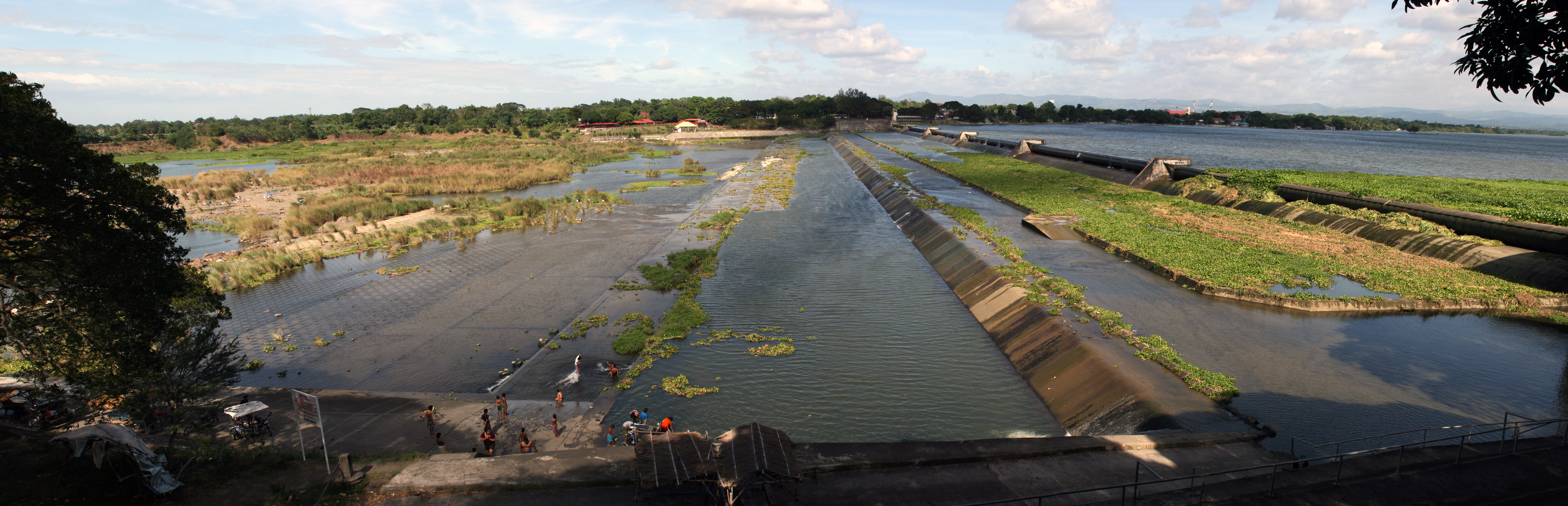
- (From top, left to right): Bustos Municipal Hall • Bulacan Military Area Park • Santo Niño de Bustos Parish Church • Bustos Dam panoramic view

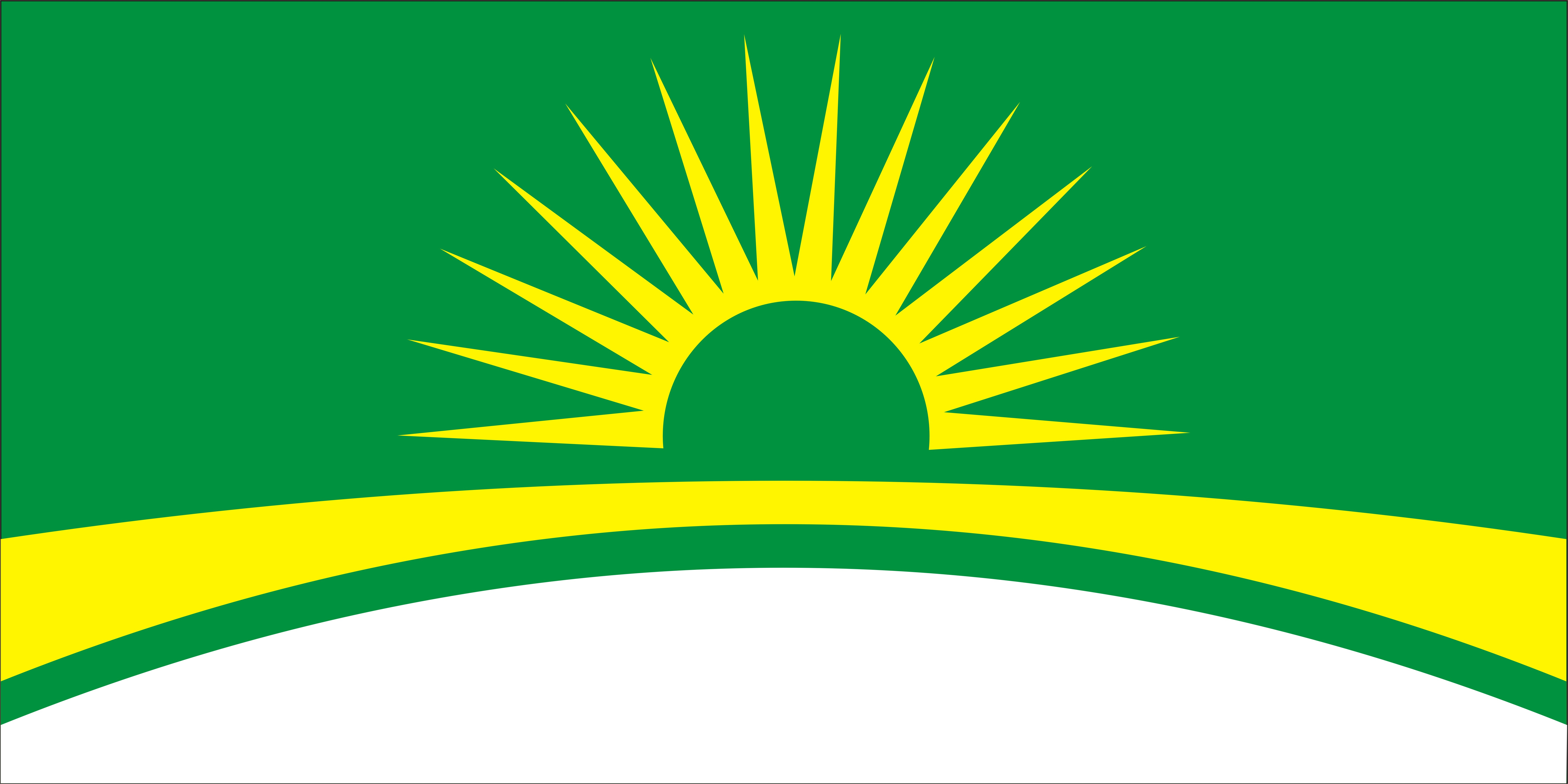
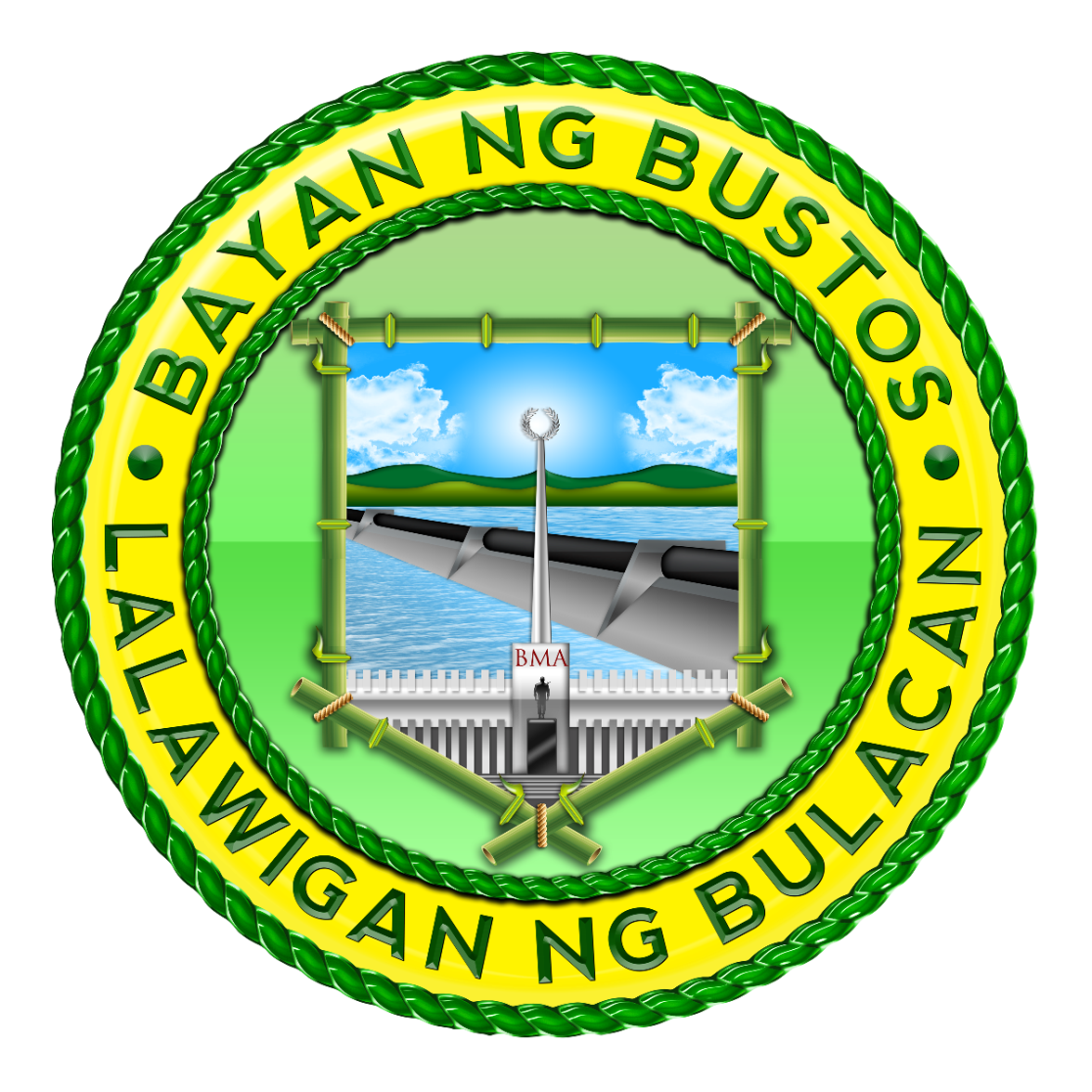
- Flag Seal
- Motto: Minasa ng kaunlaran!
- Anthem: Bayang Dakila (Himno ng Bustos)
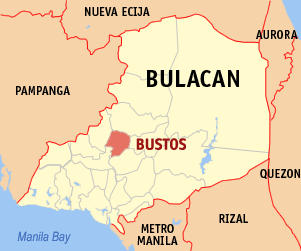
- Map of Bulacan with Bustos highlighted
- Interactive map of Bustos
- Location within the Philippines
- Coordinates: 14°57′N 120°55′E
- Country: Philippines
- Region: Central Luzon
- Province: Bulacan
- District: 2nd district
- Founded: January 1, 1917
- Named for: Jose Pedro Pérez de Busto[s]
- Barangays: 14 (see Barangays)

Government
  - Type: Sangguniang Bayan
  - Mayor: Francis Albert G. Juan
  - Vice Mayor: Martin S. Angeles
  - Representative: Augustina Dominique C. Pancho
  - Municipal Council: Members: Gen Santos; Kyle Navarro; RC Bunag Cabalquinto; Anel Quiñones; Leo Santos; Mel Melencio; Tangkol Perez; Engr. Glecy Perez
  - Electorate: 50,590 voters (2025)

Area
  - Total: 69.99 km^{2} (27.02 sq mi)
- Elevation: 22 m (72 ft)
- Highest elevation: 58 m (190 ft)
- Lowest elevation: 9 m (30 ft)

Population (2024 census)
  - Total: 80,565
  - Density: 1,151/km^{2} (2,981/sq mi)
  - Households: 19,596
- Demonym(s): Bustosenyo (male); Bustosenya (female)

Economy
  - Income class: 1st municipal income class
  - Poverty incidence: 11.26% (2023)
  - Revenue: ₱ 320.7 million (2024)
  - Assets: ₱ 309.1 million (2024)
  - Expenditure: ₱ 319.5 million (2024)
  - Liabilities: ₱ 91.78 million (2024)

Utilities
  - Electricity: Meralco
- Time zone: UTC+8 (PST)
- ZIP code: 3007
- PSGC: 0301406000
- IDD : area code: +63 (0)44
- Native languages: Tagalog

Bustos, officially the Municipality of Bustos (Tagalog: Bayan ng Bustos), is a municipality in the province of Bulacan, Philippines. According to the 2024 census, it has a population of 80,565 people.

== Etymology ==
The town got its name from Jose Pedro Perez de Bustos, a mining engineer from Villaviciosa, Asturias, Spain who served as the right-hand of Simón de Anda y Salazar and was appointed teniente general alcalde (Provincial Governor) of Bulacan.

== History ==
Bustos was a part of the town of Baliuag as its barrio during the Spanish Period. The town was separated from Baliuag by an incident in 1860, when during a rainy Sunday, a group of natives from Bustos with babies in their arms were on their way to St. Augustine Parish Church of Baliuag for baptismal when they drowned after the planceta or raft they were riding capsized while crossing the Angat River due to the strong water current. This event led the people of Bustos to request and build their own parish church to avoid the river crossings. The locals chose the Holy Child Jesus (Santo Niño) as their patron saint in honor of those infants that died in the river.

Bustos gained its independence from Baliuag on April 29, 1867, with the integration of barrios Bonga Mayor and Bonga Menor. However, it was returned to Baliuag on October 8, 1903, with San Rafael merging as well.

Bustos became a distinct municipality on January 1, 1916, during the Philippine Assembly through Assemblyman Ricardo Lloret Gonzalez (Bulacan–2nd). The town inaugurated its municipal hall on January 1, 1917. Leon Prado became its first Municipal Mayor and served from 1917 to 1919. Gabriel Alvarez served as the first parish priest of the institutionalized Santo Niño de Bustos Parish Church.

During World War II, Bustos served as the military headquarters of soldiers in the province of Bulacan being led by Bustosenyo then Capt. Alejo Santos.

With the theme "Bustos Sentenaryo: Isang Daan tungo sa Ikasandaan" (lit. transl. Bustos Centenary: One Way Towards One Hundredth), Bustos celebrated its 100th year founding anniversary in 2017, at the same time as the Santo Niño de Bustos Parish Church's 150th year founding anniversary as an independent parish church of the municipality. The Philippine Postal Corporation made a special commemorative stamp for the centennial anniversary celebration of the town.

== Geography ==
Bustos is located at the center of five adjoining towns of Bulacan: San Rafael on the north; Pandi and Plaridel on the south; Baliuag on the west; and Angat on the east. With the continuous expansion of Metro Manila, Bustos is part of Manila's built-up area which reaches San Ildefonso, Bulacan at its northernmost part.

The land areas are mostly rice fields devoted for planting crops and agricultural products. Some farmlands of the town are covered by irrigation systems of National Irrigation Administration coming from Bustos Dam and Angat Dam on the Angat River.

Bustos is 29 kilometres (18 mi) from Malolos, 52 kilometres (32 mi) from Manila, 35 kilometres (22 mi) from San Jose del Monte, and 11 kilometres (6.8 mi) from Plaridel.

=== Barangays ===
Bustos is politicially subdivided into 14 barangays, as shown in the matrix below. There are (six urban and eight rural) barangays. Each barangay consists of puroks and some have sitios.

PSGC	Barangay	Population			±% p.a.	
		2024		2010		
031406001	Bonga Mayor	4.7%	3,792	4,407	▾	−1.04%
031406002	Bonga Menor	5.7%	4,619	4,742	▾	−0.18%
031406003	Buisan	2.3%	1,869	1,783	▴	0.33%
031406004	Camachilihan	3.2%	2,552	2,289	▴	0.76%
031406005	Cambaog	7.7%	6,242	5,592	▴	0.77%
031406006	Catacte	9.9%	7,990	2,367	▴	8.83%
031406007	Liciada	6.2%	5,017	4,702	▴	0.45%
031406008	Malamig	7.0%	5,633	5,313	▴	0.41%
031406009	Malawak	3.5%	2,789	2,383	▴	1.10%
031406010	Poblacion	8.9%	7,153	9,641	▾	−2.05%
031406011	San Pedro	8.7%	6,994	6,506	▴	0.50%
031406012	Talampas	4.1%	3,325	3,660	▾	−0.67%
031406013	Tanawan	3.6%	2,862	2,946	▾	−0.20%
031406014	Tibagan	7.7%	6,202	6,084	▴	0.13%
	Total		80,565	62,415	▴	1.79%

=== Climate ===
Climate data for Bustos, Bulacan
Month	Jan	Feb	Mar	Apr	May	Jun	Jul	Aug	Sep	Oct	Nov	Dec	Year
Mean daily maximum °C (°F)	28 (82)	29 (84)	31 (88)	33 (91)	32 (90)	31 (88)	30 (86)	29 (84)	29 (84)	30 (86)	30 (86)	28 (82)	30 (86)
Mean daily minimum °C (°F)	20 (68)	20 (68)	21 (70)	22 (72)	24 (75)	24 (75)	24 (75)	24 (75)	24 (75)	23 (73)	22 (72)	21 (70)	22 (72)
Average precipitation mm (inches)	6 (0.2)	4 (0.2)	6 (0.2)	17 (0.7)	82 (3.2)	122 (4.8)	151 (5.9)	123 (4.8)	124 (4.9)	99 (3.9)	37 (1.5)	21 (0.8)	792 (31.1)
Average rainy days	3.3	2.5	11.7	6.6	17.7	22.2	25.2	23.7	23.2	17.9	9.2	5.2	168.4
Source: Meteoblue

== Demographics ==
Population census of Bustos
Year	Pop.	±% p.a.
1903	7,072	—
1918	6,855	−0.21%
1939	8,692	+1.14%
1948	10,493	+2.11%
1960	13,412	+2.07%
1970	19,254	+3.68%
1975	22,622	+3.29%
1980	25,739	+2.61%
1990	34,965	+3.11%
1995	41,372	+3.20%
2000	47,091	+2.81%
2007	60,681	+3.56%
2010	62,415	+1.03%
2015	67,039	+1.37%
2020	77,199	+3.01%
2024	80,565	+1.03%
Source: Philippine Statistics Authority

In the 2020 census, the population of Bustos, Bulacan, was 77,199 people, with a density of 1,100 inhabitants per square kilometre or 2,800 inhabitants per square mile.

=== Religion ===
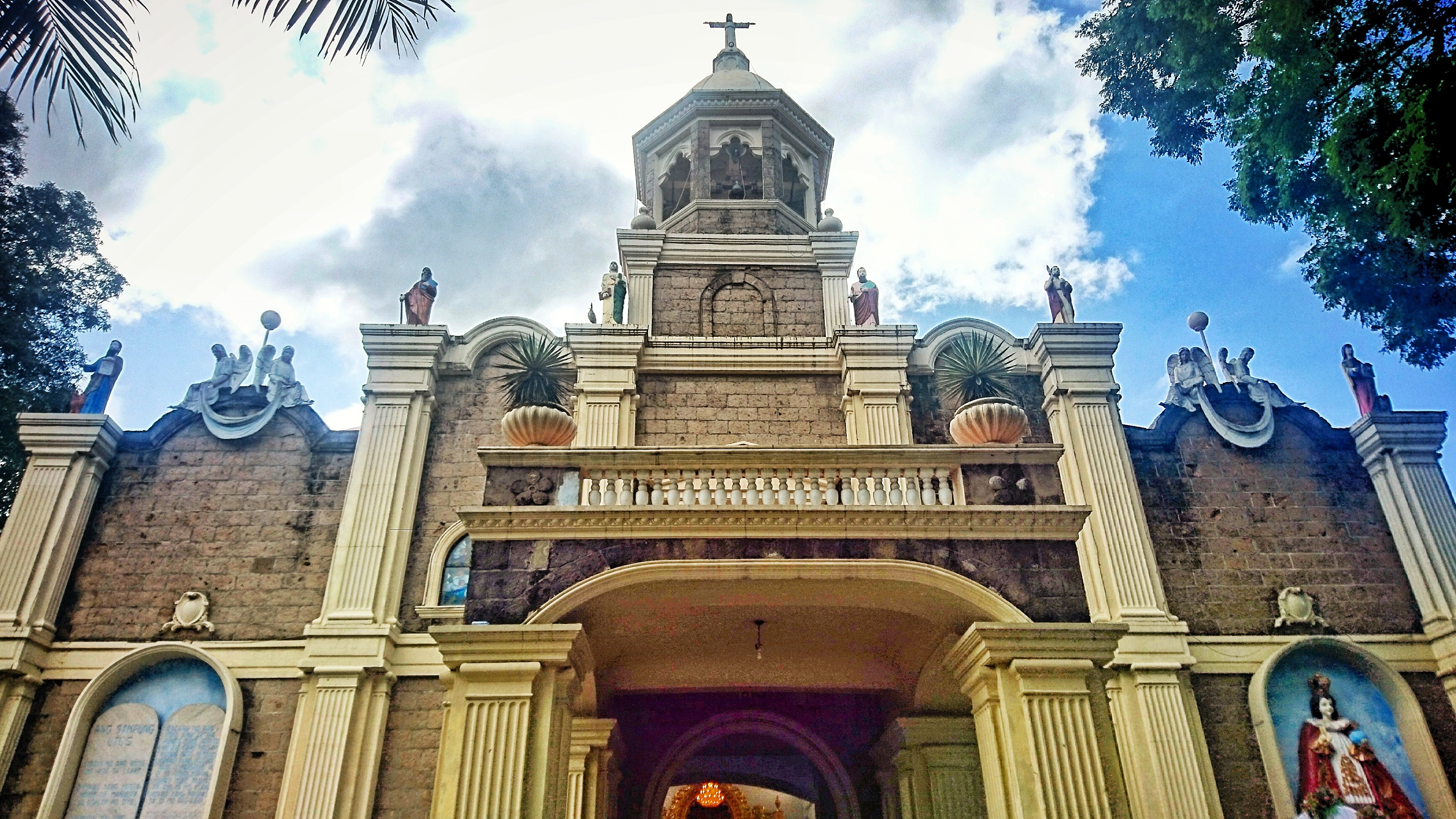
Façade of Santo Niño Parish

Bustos has two parishes under the administration of the Diocese of Malolos, Santo Niño de Bustos Parish Church and San Isidro Labrador Parish Church.

Other Christian religious groups, such as Iglesia ni Cristo, Seventh-day Adventist Church, Jesus is Lord Church, Ang Dating Daan, the Church of Jesus Christ of Latter-day Saints, Jehovah's Witnesses and other Protestant groups can be found in the municipality.

People in Bustos celebrate a number of Catholic holidays throughout the year. The first church in Bustos has been dedicated to Santo Niño, the Holy Child Jesus, and there is a feast that is held in memory every third Sunday of January, where the townspeople celebrate it with music and dance while holding images of Santo Niño decorated with flowers and lights with parade of floats with images of the saint (locally known as Tugyaw).

== Economy ==
Poverty incidence of Bustos (%)

Source: Philippine Statistics Authority

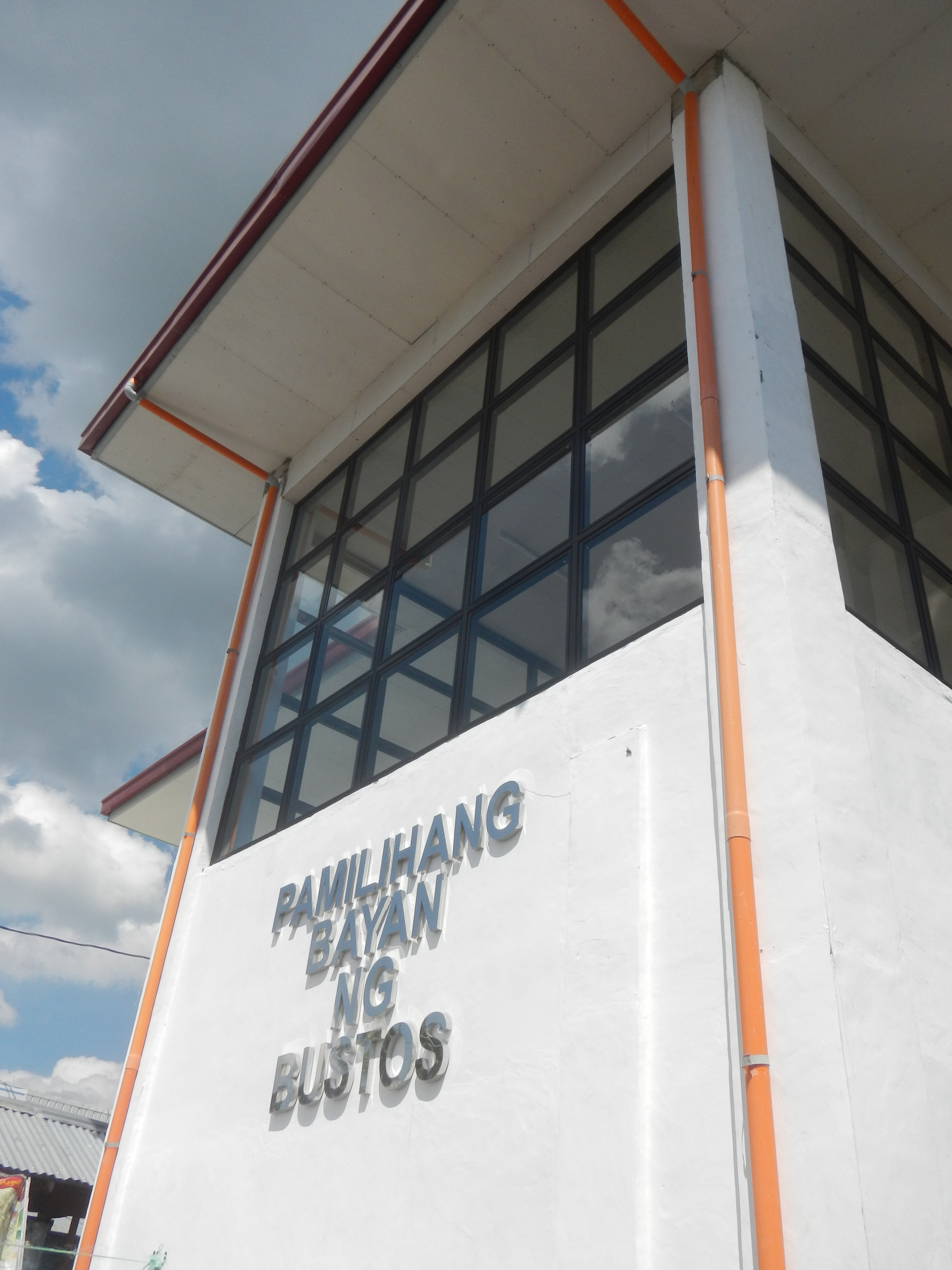
Bustos Wet and Dry Public Market

Bustos is, in the majority, an agricultural town. It is hailed as one of the largest rice producers of the country and the Central Luzon Region (the Rice Granary of the Philippines), and received the Rice Achiever Award as an Outstanding Municipality in Region III (Central Luzon) and a Hall of Fame award at the Agri-Pinoy Rice Achievers Awards of 2014 conferred by the Department of Agriculture.

The Bustos commercial center in the town proper is still expanding with the influx of more business investors willing to venture into the small but flourishing town. At present, the town has its public market and a few small private markets, business shops, banks, convenience stores, restaurants, cafeterias, and grocery stores.

Bustos has its own trademark product, the finger food 'minasa'.

Minasa refers to "cassava cookies", made from cassava flour, egg yolk, yeast, butter, and coco milk. It is often compared to the uraro, another local delicacy. Minasa is one of the famous treats from the province of Bulacan traded in the local and global market of Filipino pasalubong products. During the Spanish colonial era, Bustos' minasa cookies were made from sago or arrowroot starch instead of cassava. The main ingredient was changed because of the long production time of sago starch and when cassava starch became cheaper and easier to produce with the onset of cassava flour-making equipment. Also, minasas were exclusively produced and eaten by the elite Bulakeños who were the only ones who could afford the ingredients and the equipment for the production of the flour.

The word minasa translates to "molded" in English. The process of preparing minasa is similar to the making and baking of cookies. The only special characteristics of minasa are its shape, which is molded on specially made wooden molders with intricate designs, commonly floral designs, and its being baked in a hurno or brick stone oven that adds to the yumminess of the cookie. Minasa is said to be a part of the history and culture of Bulacan because of the egg yolks that were left in kitchens during the building of old stone houses that were made of egg whites. Currently, there are stalls all around Bustos selling this local delicacy, making the municipality the "Home of Minasa".

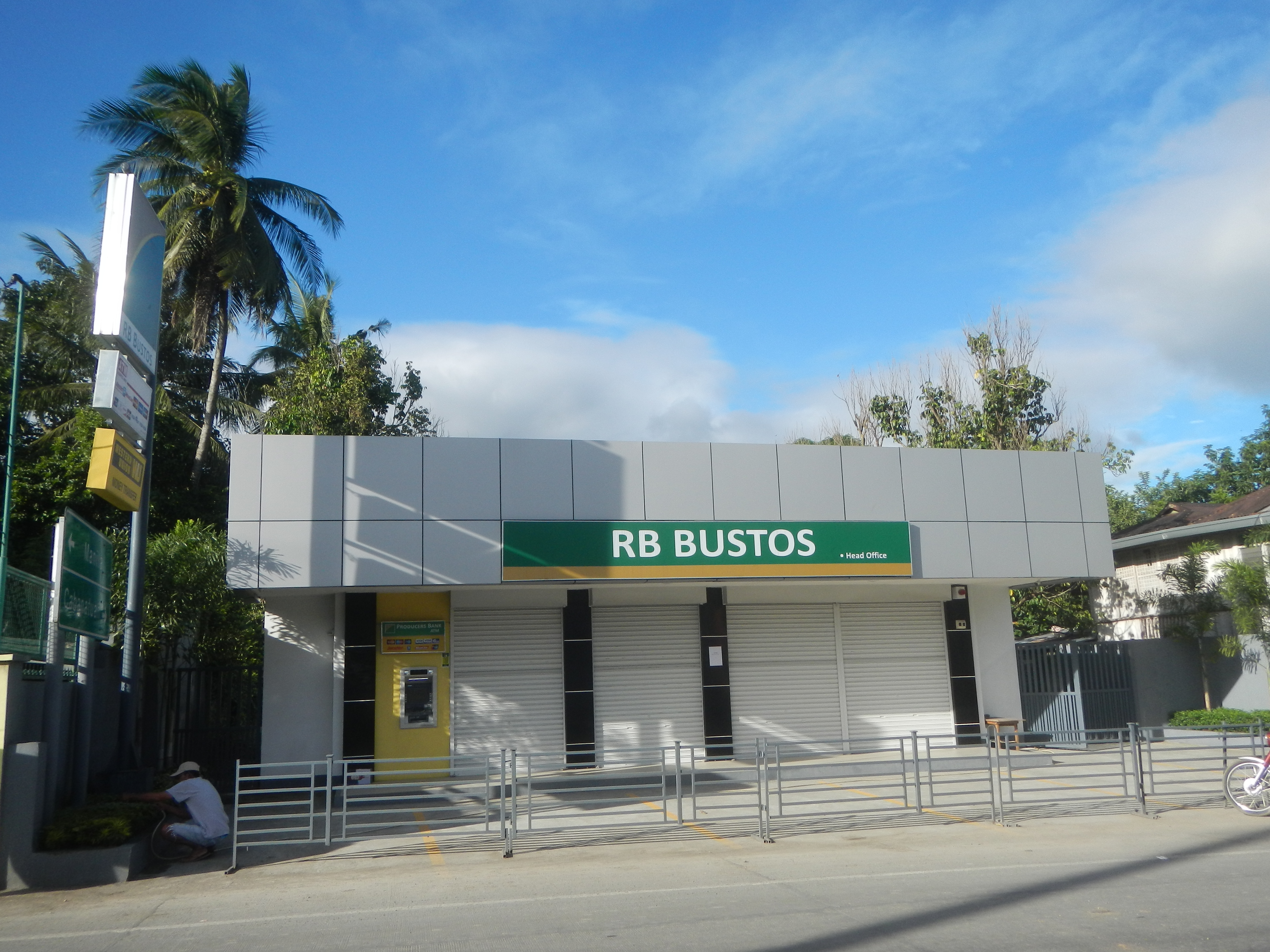
The Rural Bank of Bustos under Producers Savings Bank Corporation

Bustos has a rural bank, the Rural Bank of Bustos, which is located at Gen. Alejo Santos Highway, Barangay Bonga Menor, beside the Bustos by-pass road going to Cabanatuan, Nueva Ecija. It has a branch in Barangay Poblacion in front of Santo Niño Hospital. The bank is currently under the management of Producers Savings Bank Corporation.

Other products, industries, & services

- Rice and other agricultural products
- Poultry & swine raising and other dairy products
- Bags and handicrafts making
- Pastry making
- Food processing and retail selling
- Garments and embroidery
- Metal-crafting
- Furniture making
- Fishpond raising
- Recreational facilities and services
- Resorts and hotels
- Electrical supply and hardware

== Culture ==
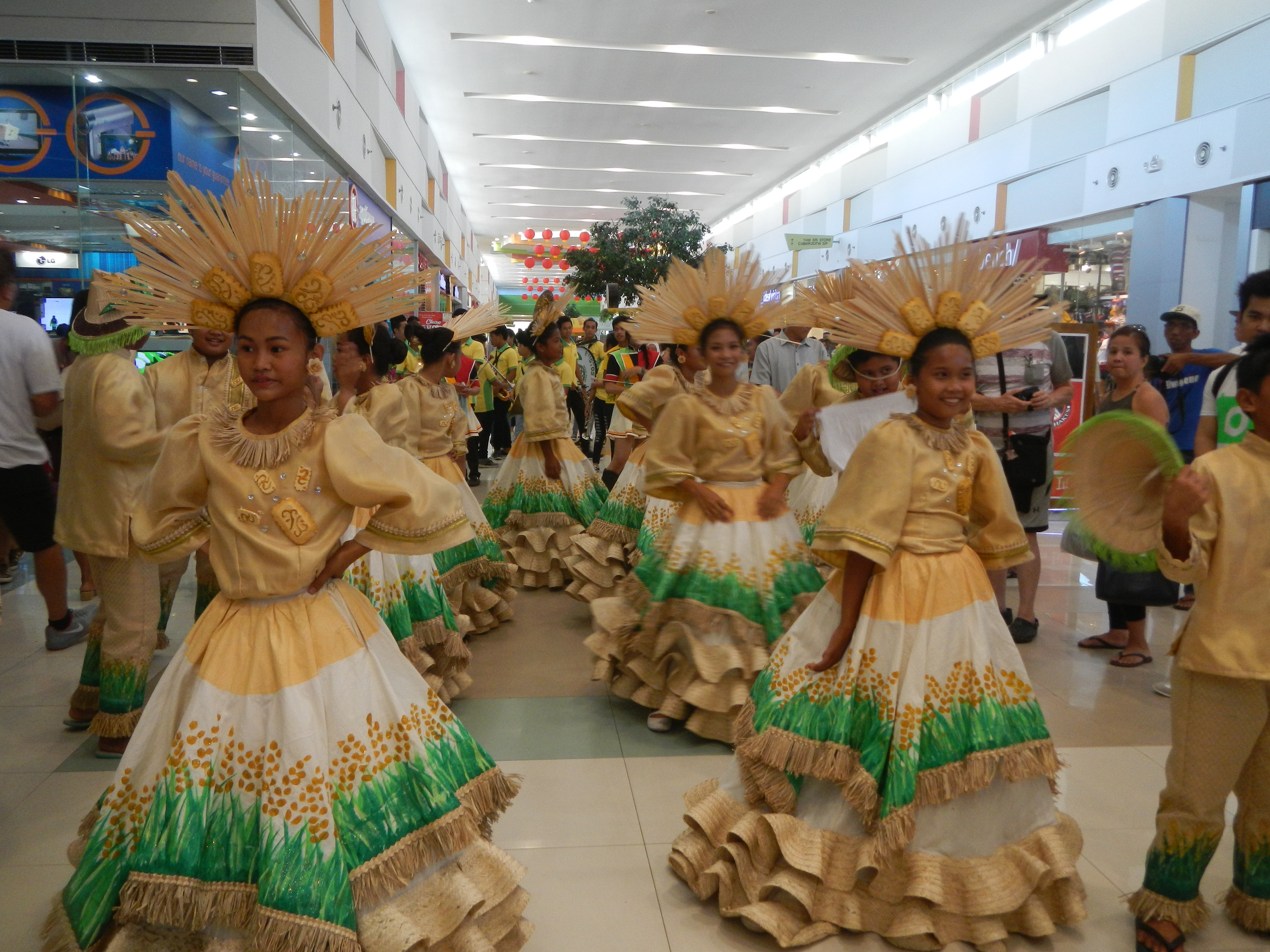
2016 Minasa Festival street dance demonstration at SM City Baliwag Event Center

Minasa Festival is the official festival of Bustos observed every January where street dances, dance showdowns, cooking contests, singing contests, running events, beauty pageants, live band concerts and other variety shows are commonly done. It features the cookie minasa, a locally made delicacy as well as other items such as the dry-like wafer crispy barquillos. The festival was first celebrated in 2011 and since then, the activity is televised yearly.

Manok-Manok (Chicken) Festival in Barangay San Pedro every June and Hito (Catfish) Festival in Barangay Camachilihan every August are also observed.

== Government ==
=== Local government ===
Bustos is a recipient of the 2017 Seal of Good Local Governance given by the Department of the Interior and Local Government. Based on the 2022 Philippine general election, here are the following elected local officials of the Municipality of Bustos for the term 2022 – 2025.

2022–2025 Bustos Municipal Officials
Position	Name	Party
Mayor	Francis Albert "Iskul" G. Juan	NUP
Vice Mayor	Martin S. Angeles	NUP
Councilors	Marie Niña N. Perez	PFP
Councilors	Leo T. Santos	PFP
Councilors	Phillip Wryner "Gen" B. Santos	PFP
Councilors	Juliet D. Dela Cruz	PDP–Laban
Councilors	Aljhaneal "Anel" E. Quiñones	PFP
Councilors	Soliman C. Santos	PFP
Councilors	Wilfredo "Willy" G. Canoza	PDP–Laban
Councilors	John Erick "Tangkol" L. Perez	PFP
Ex Officio Municipal Council Members
ABC President	Fortunato SJ. Angeles (Liciada)	Nonpartisan
SK Federation President	Kyle Gabrille D.R Navarro (Tibagan)	Nonpartisan

== Transportation ==
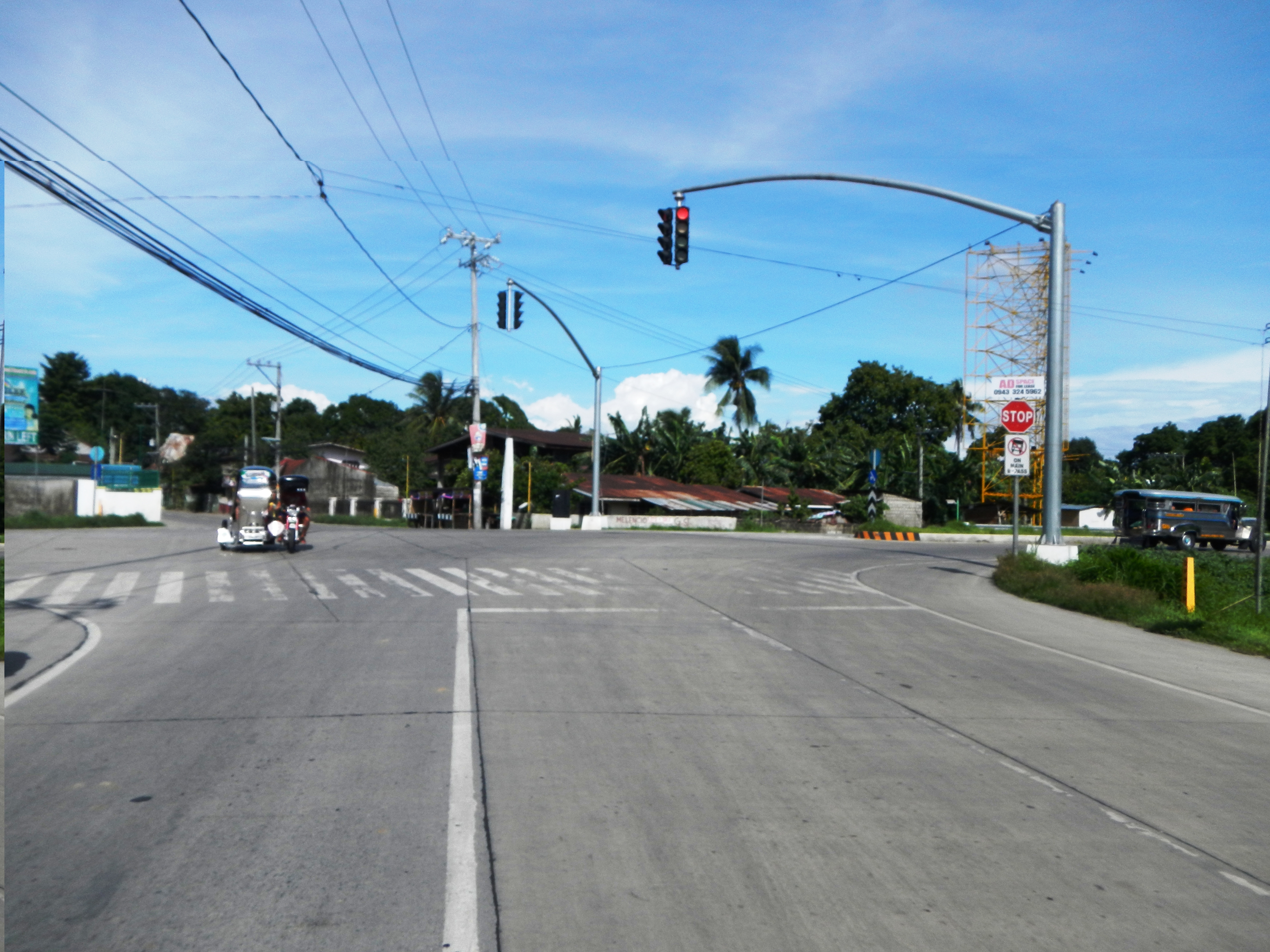
Bustos Bypass Road

North Luzon Expressway has a by-pass road that passes through the municipality of Bustos that shortens the transportation of goods and passengers from some areas in Bulacan going to Metro Manila and Nueva Ecija. The Bustos by-pass road passes through Gen. Alejo Santos Highway at Barangay Bonga Menor, Bustos, Bulacan and travels to NLEx Balagtas Exit Toll Plaza leading to Balintawak Cloverleaf, Quezon City, on one side and San Rafael, Bulacan, leading to Cabanatuan, Nueva Ecija, on the other.

== Education ==
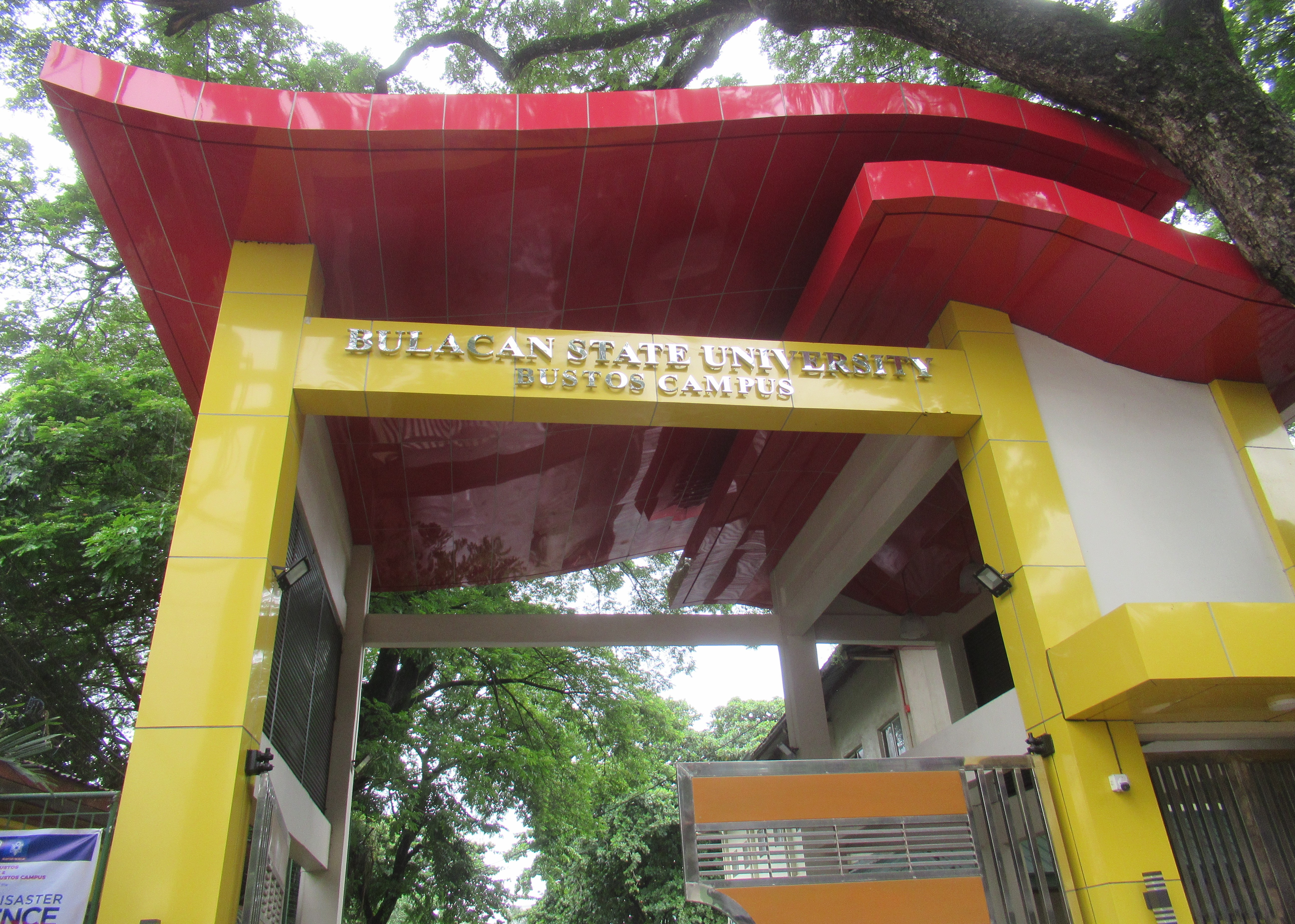
Gate of Bulacan State University – Bustos Campus

There are eight secondary schools in Bustos, four of which are public while every barangay has its own public pre-elementary and elementary school.

Bulacan State University – Bustos Campus (BulSU-Bustos) is the largest satellite campus of the university. It was established in 1976 and it offers degrees in education, industrial technology, information technology, engineering, and business administration.

== Education ==
The Bustos Schools District Office governs all educational institutions within the municipality. It oversees the management and operations of all private and public, from primary to secondary schools.

=== Primary and elementary schools ===
- Bulacan Heights Elementary School
- Bonga Mayor Elementary School
- Bonga Menor Elementary School
- Bustos Elementary School
- Camachilihan Elementary School
- Cambaog Elementary School
- Camchild Learning Center
- Catacte Elementary School
- Dr. Manuel G. Ramirez Memorial Elementary School
- Holy Child Academy
- Immaculate Concepcion School of Baliuag
- Liciada Elementary School
- Malamig Elementary School
- Mary and Jesus School
- Notre Christi Academy of the Philippines
- san isidro parochial school
- S.S. Del Rosario Elementary School
- San Pedro Elementary School
- Shekinah Christian Academy of Bulacan
- Tibagan Elementary School

=== Secondary schools ===
- Aguinaldo J. Santos National High School
- Alexis G. Santos National High School
- Cambaog National High School
- Colegio de Sto. Niño de Bustos
- Dr. Pablito V. Mendoza, Sr. High School

== Notable personalities ==
- Alejo Santos – popularly known as "Manong"; a survivor of Bataan Death March; a World War II hero; leader of the Bulacan Military Area; former Secretary of National Defense of the Philippines under then President Carlos P. Garcia; former Military Governor of Bulacan province; ran in the Philippine Presidential Elections before but lost to then President Ferdinand E. Marcos.
- Katy de la Cruz – also known as "Mommy Kate"; "Queen of Philippine Vaudeville/ Bodabil", "Queen of Filipino Jazz" and awarded as FAMAS Best Supporting Actress.
- Luzviminda Tancangco – also known as "Baby"; first non-lawyer and woman commissioner of the Philippine Commission on Elections. She was also its first female acting chairman (1998–1999).
- Gen. Carlito Galvez Jr. – Former Chief of Staff of the Armed Forces of the Philippines; former commander of the 6th Infantry Division (Philippines); former chairman of Coordinating Committee on the Cessation of Hostilities; and former commander of AFP Western Mindanao Command and known for his leadership in the Battle of Marawi.
- Rear Admiral Hilario Ruiz – former Flag Officer in Command of the Philippine Navy (PN); one of Rolex 12 advisers of President Ferdinand Marcos during his martial law period; BRP Hilario Ruiz (PG-378), a coastal patrol boat of the Philippine Navy, is named after him.
- Gen. Romeo Maganto – retired and decorated police general of the Philippine National Police having awarded with 45 medals in service; former chief of Western Police District; former traffic czar during the administration of President Fidel V. Ramos and is known as the first to implement the color coding traffic scheme in 1995; featured in the films Tomagan: Story of Gen. Romeo Maganto and Leon ng Maynila, Lt. Col. Romeo Maganto.

== Sister cities ==
Valenzuela, Metro Manila, Philippines

== Gallery ==
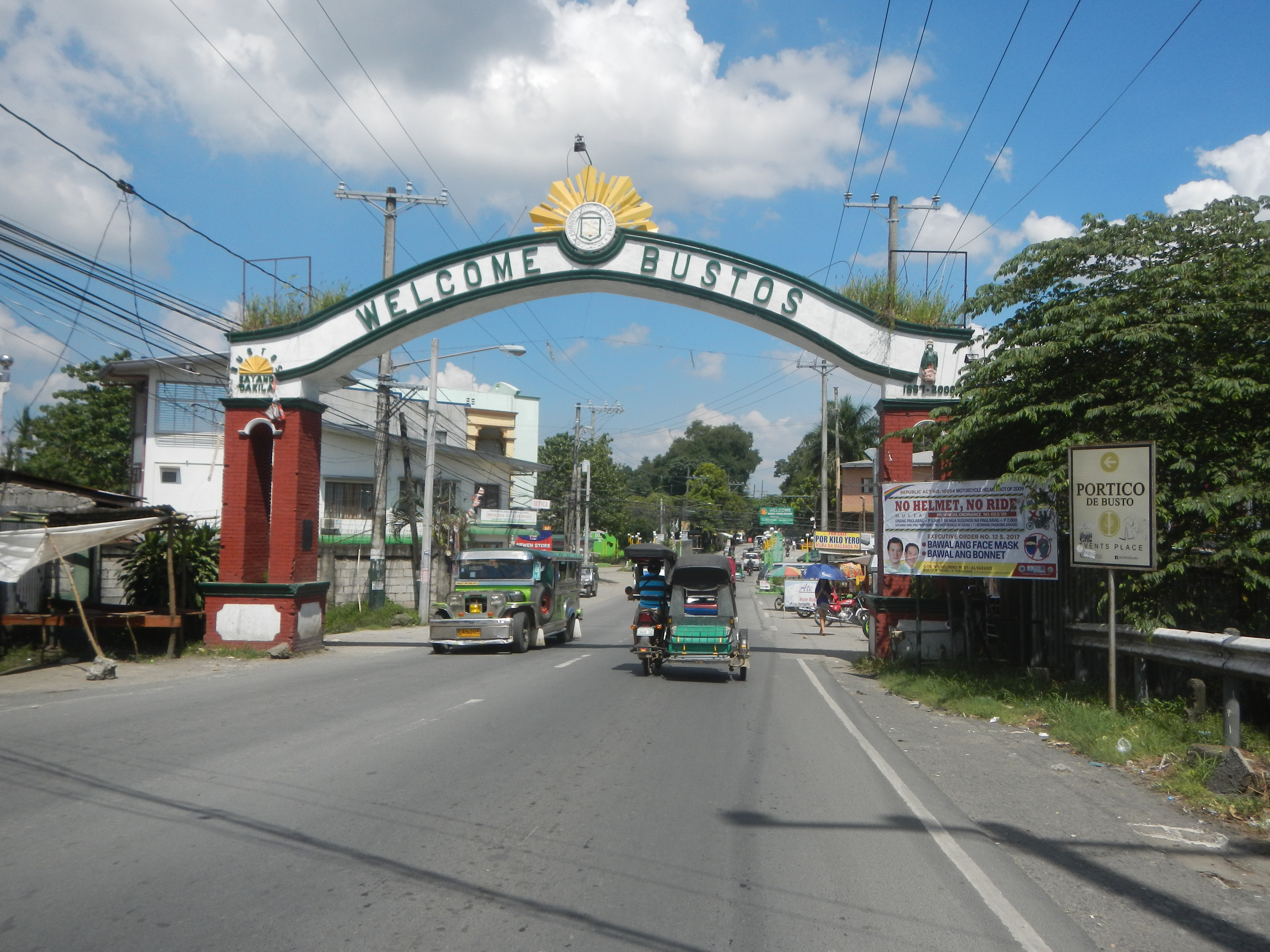
Bustos Welcome Arch from Baliwag

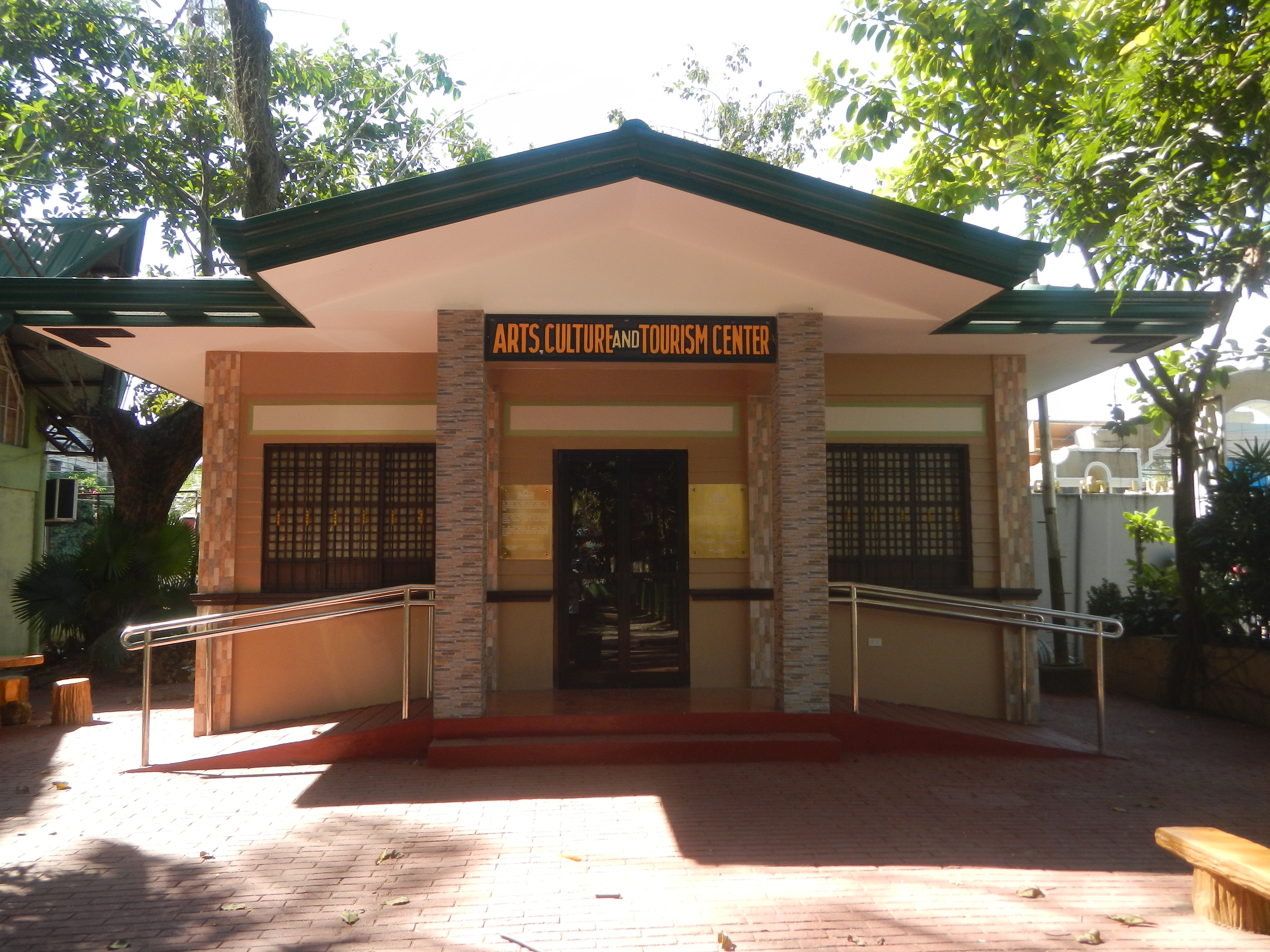
Arts, Culture and Tourism Center

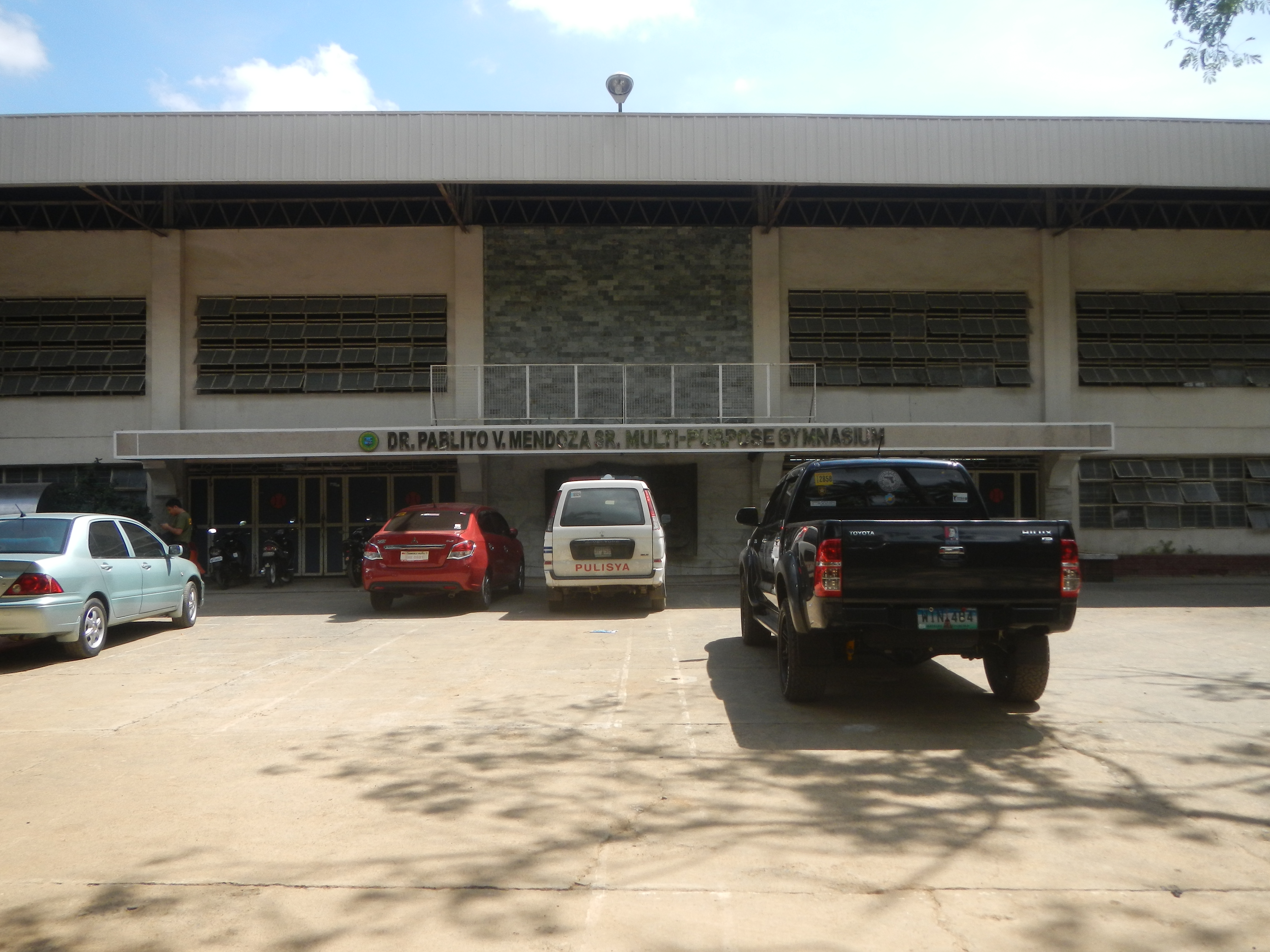
Dr. Pablito V. Mendoza, Sr. Multi-purpose Gymnasium

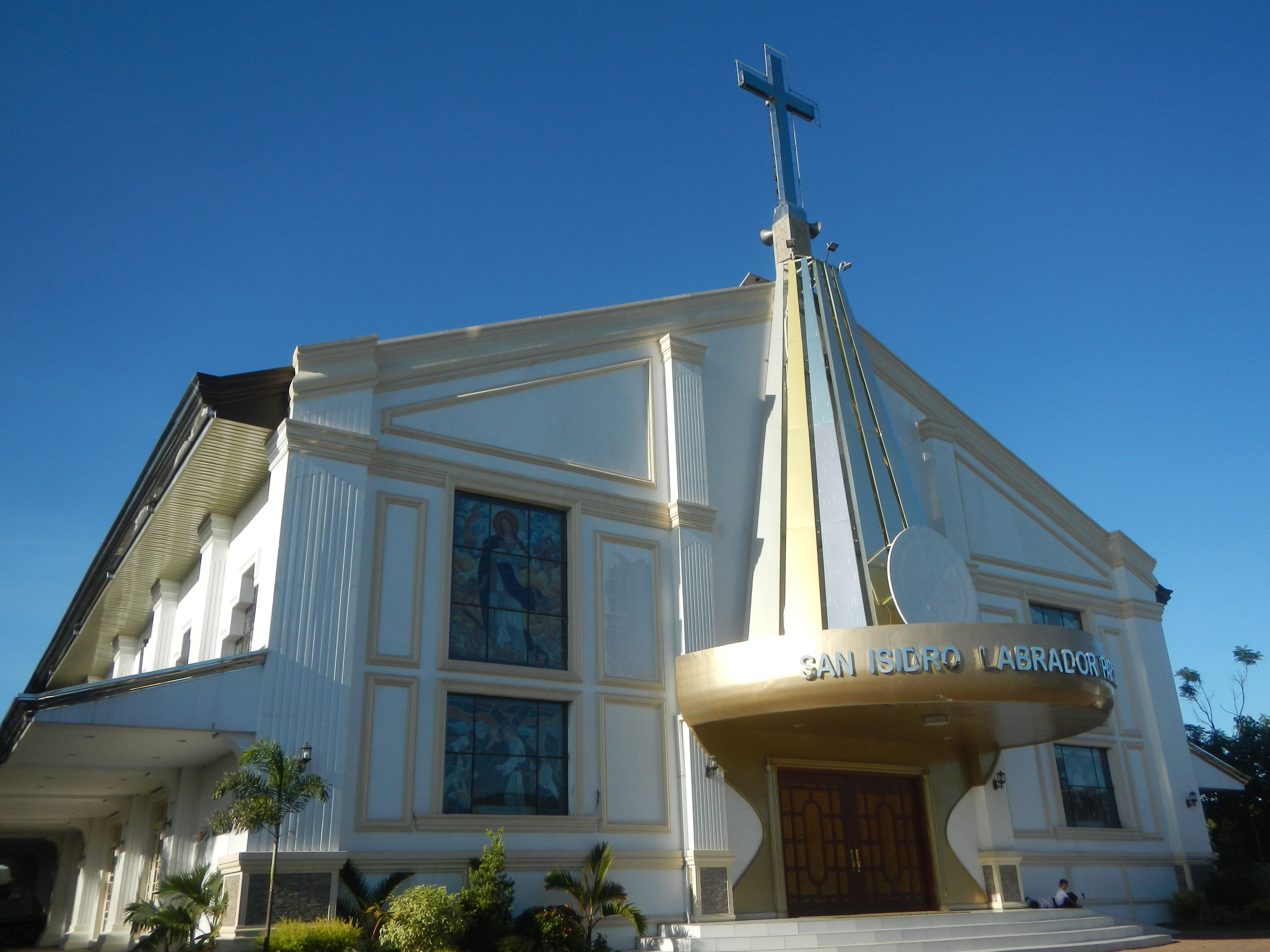
San Isidro Labrador Parish Church

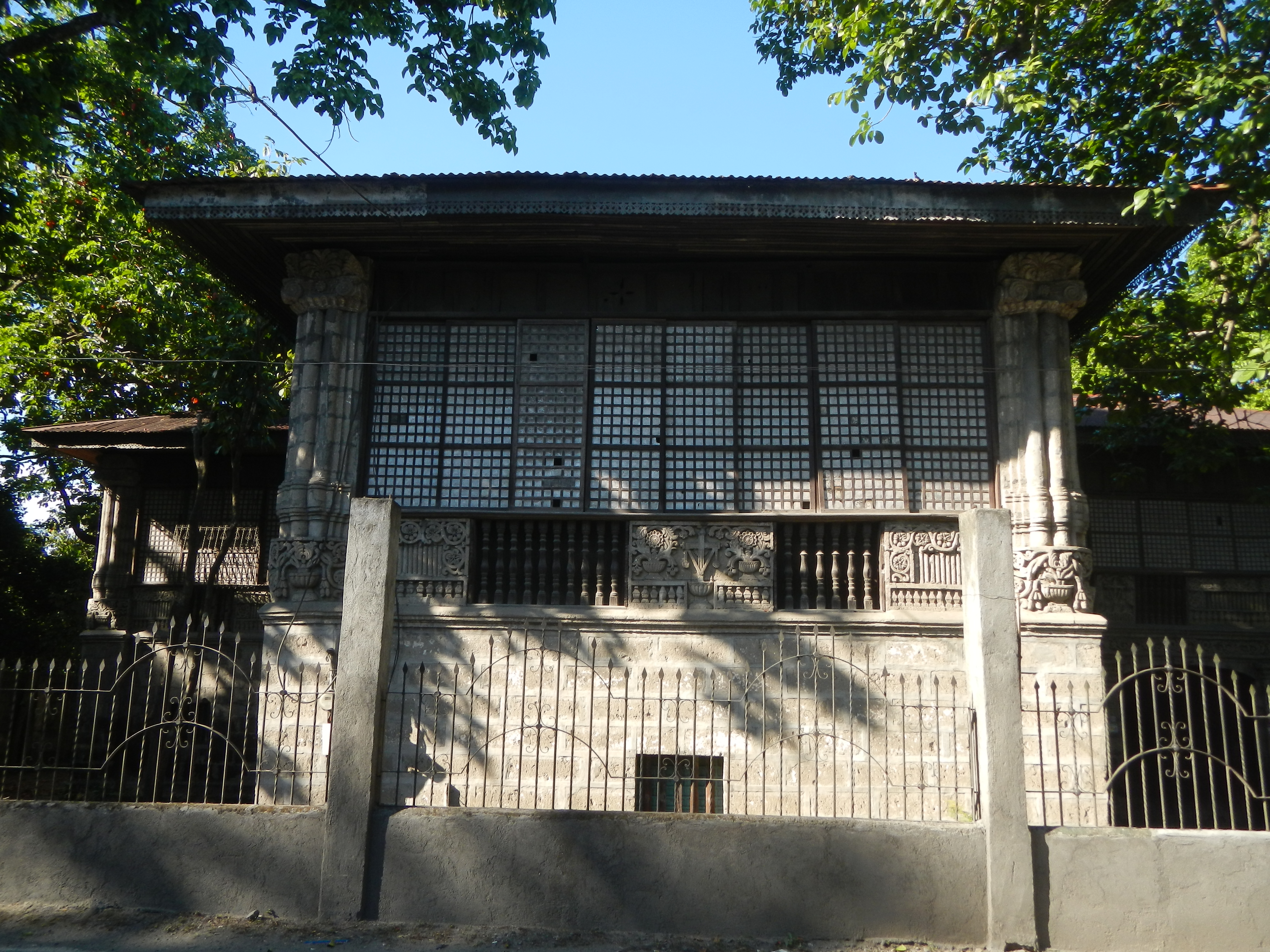
Mercado Ancestral House
