= Angat River =

Angat River Quingua River
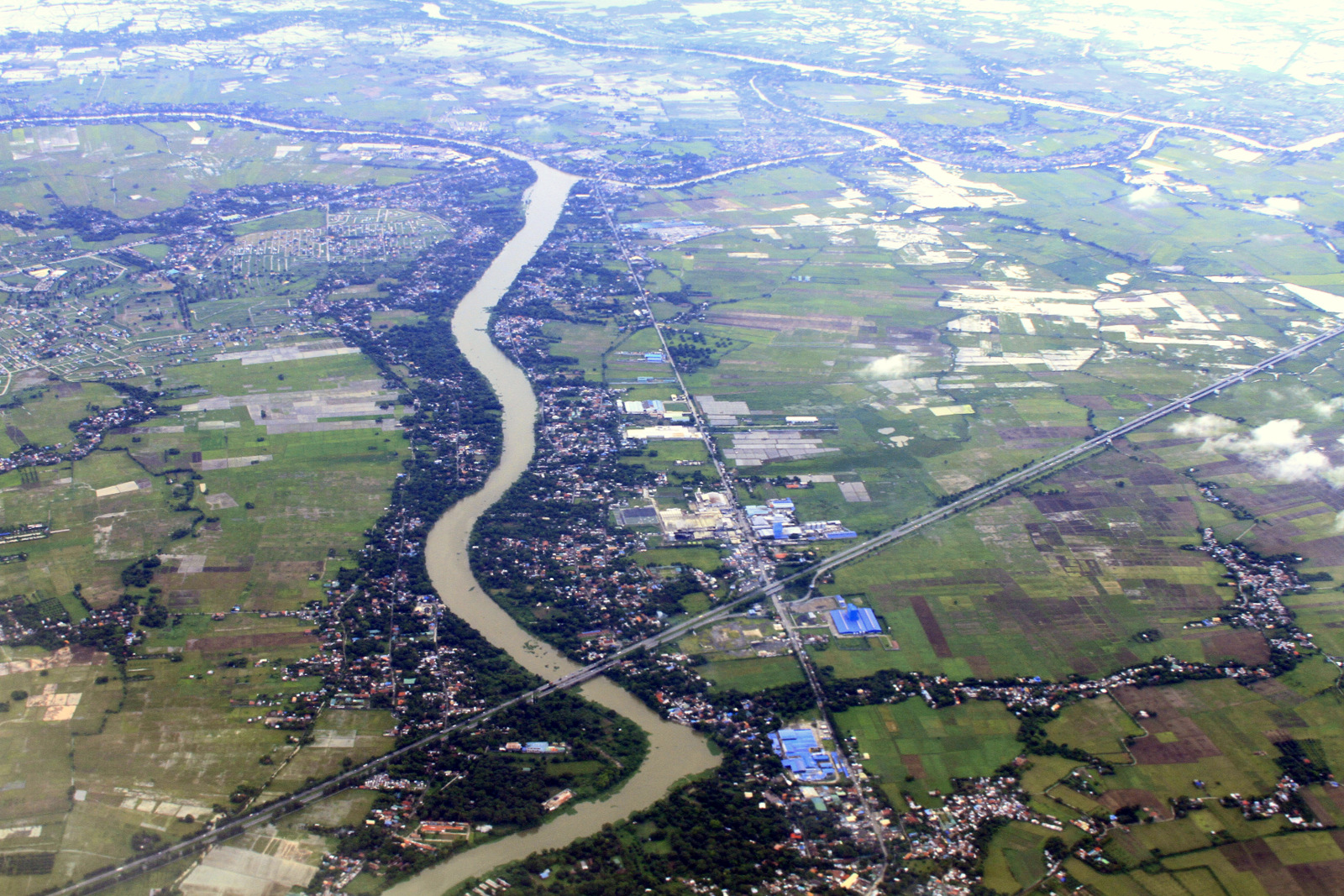
- Angat River passing through the municipalities of Pulilan (bottom right), Plaridel (bottom left) and Calumpit (background).

- Angat River mouth Angat River (Philippines)

Location
- Country: Philippines
- Region: Central Luzon
- Province: Bulacan
- City/municipality: Doña Remedios Trinidad; Norzagaray; Angat; Bustos; San Rafael; Baliwag; Plaridel; Pulilan; Calumpit; Paombong; Hagonoy

Physical characteristics
- Source
  - location: Sierra Madre mountain range
- Mouth
  - location: Manila Bay
  - coordinates: 14°45′35″N 120°45′10″E
- Length: 154 km (96 mi)
- Basin size: 1,085 square kilometres (419 sq mi)

Basin features
- River system: Angat Watershed Forest Reserve

The Angat River (also called Quingua River) is a river in the Philippines located in the province of Bulacan. It flows from the Sierra Madre mountain range to Manila Bay. Three dams are located along the river namely Angat, Ipo and Bustos. The catchment or basin area of the river is 1,085 square kilometres (419 sq mi) located in the Angat Watershed Forest Reserve. Angat River snakes through the municipalities of Doña Remedios Trinidad, Norzagaray, Angat, Bustos, San Rafael, Baliwag, Plaridel formerly "Quingua", Pulilan, Calumpit, Paombong, and Hagonoy. The river joins the Pampanga River at Calumpit via the Bagbag River.

== Crossings ==
This is listed from mouth to source.

1. Hangga Bridge (Paombong–Hagonoy boundary)
2. Iba-Ibayo Bridge (Paombong–Hagonoy boundary)
3. Labangan Bridge #1 ( N2 (MacArthur Highway), Calumpit)
4. Angat Bridge ( E1 (North Luzon Expressway), Plaridel–Pulilan boundary)
5. Plaridel-Pulilan Bridge ( AH 26 (N1) (Pan-Philippine Highway (Cagayan Valley Road), Plaridel–Pulilan boundary)
6. New Plaridel-Pulilan Bridge (Plaridel–Pulilan Diversion Road, Plaridel–Pulilan boundary)
7. General Alejo Santos Bridge (Baliwag–Bustos boundary)
8. Plaridel Bypass Road (Bustos–San Rafael boundary)
9. Angat Bridge (M. Valte Road, Angat)
10. Matictic Bridge (Dr. S. Pascual Road, Norzagaray)
11. Bitbit Bridge (Norzagaray)

== Gallery ==
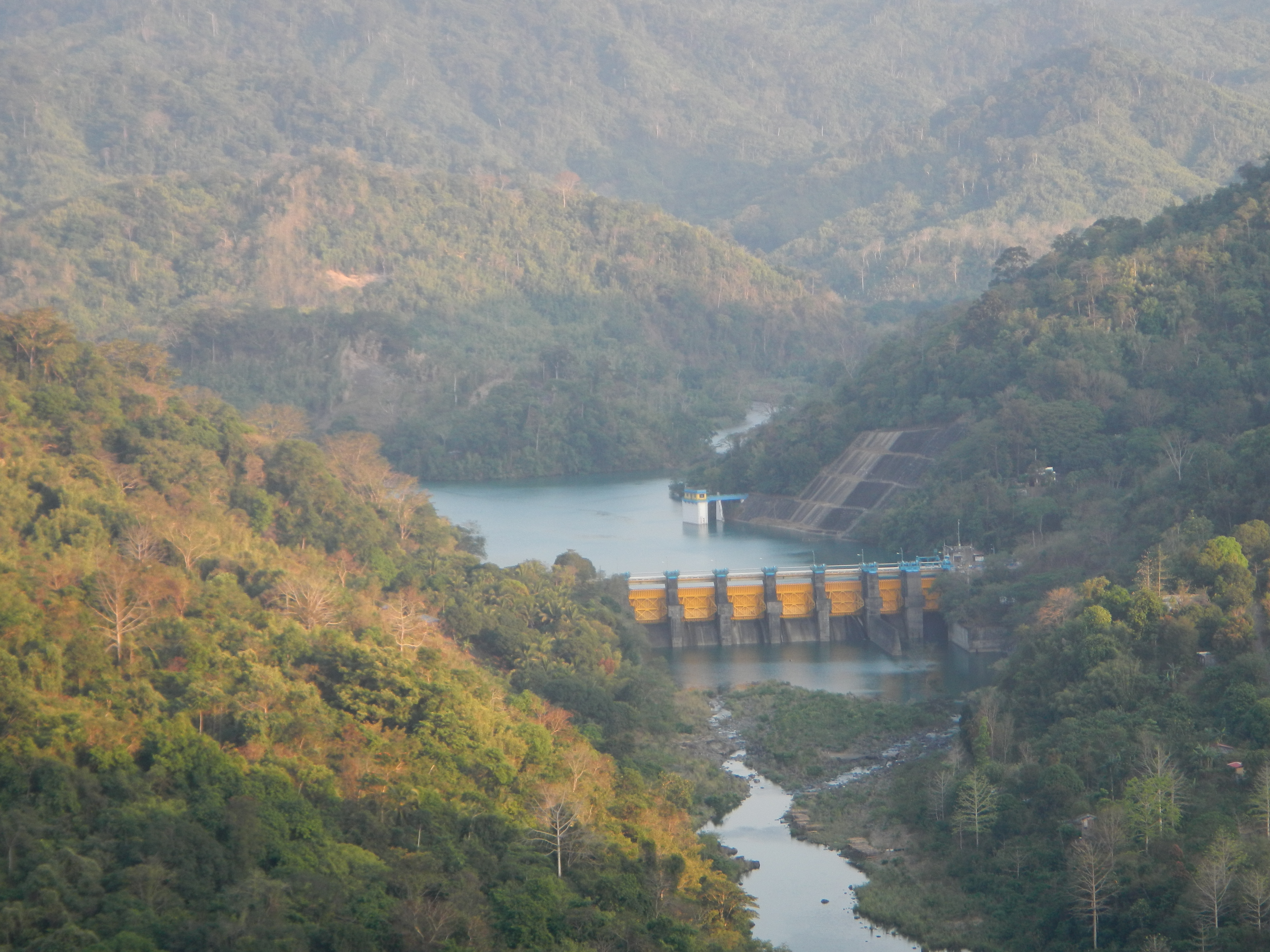
The Ipo Dam and Angat river from Norzagaray

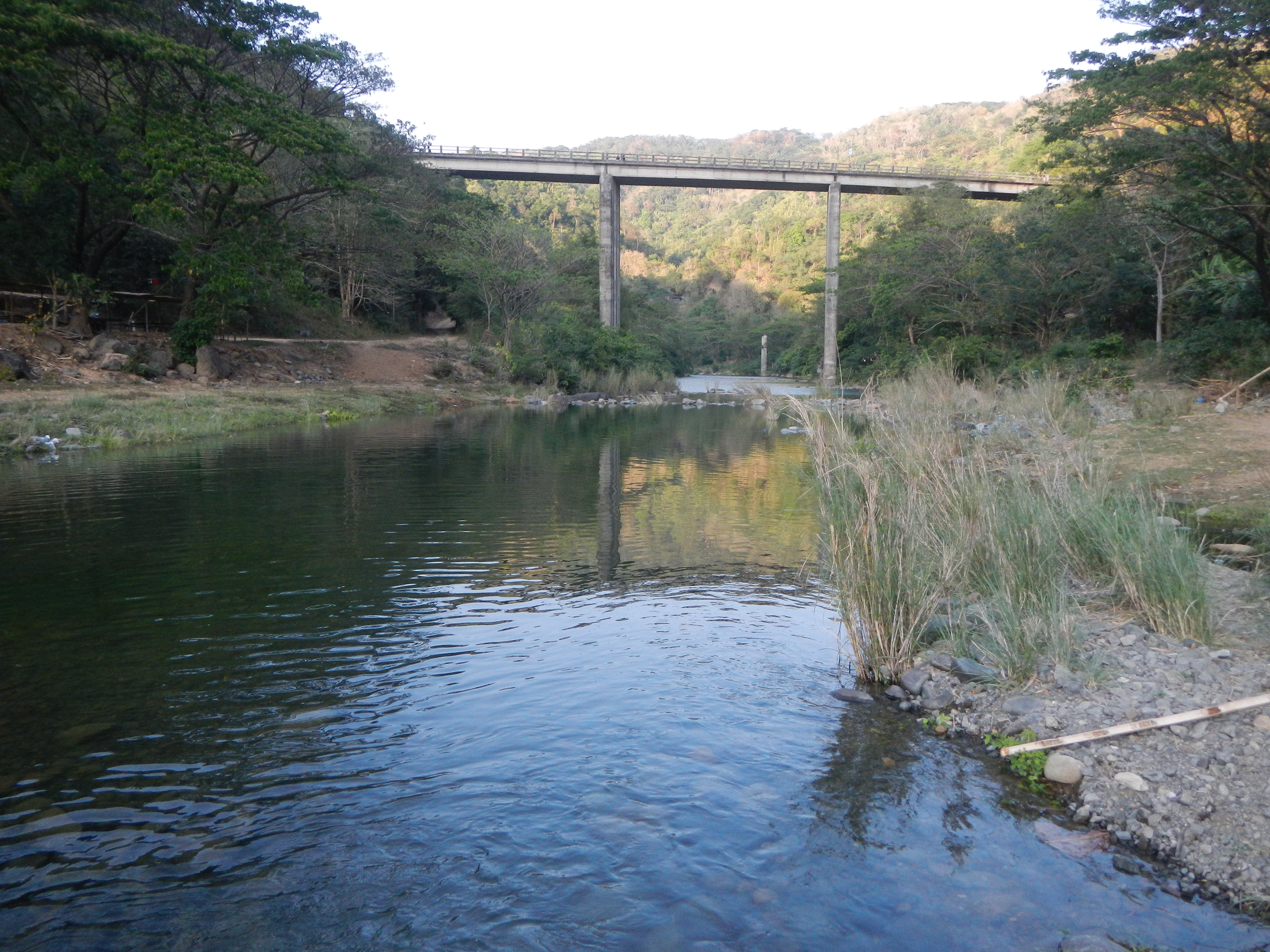
Angat river and Bitbit Bridge from Norzagaray

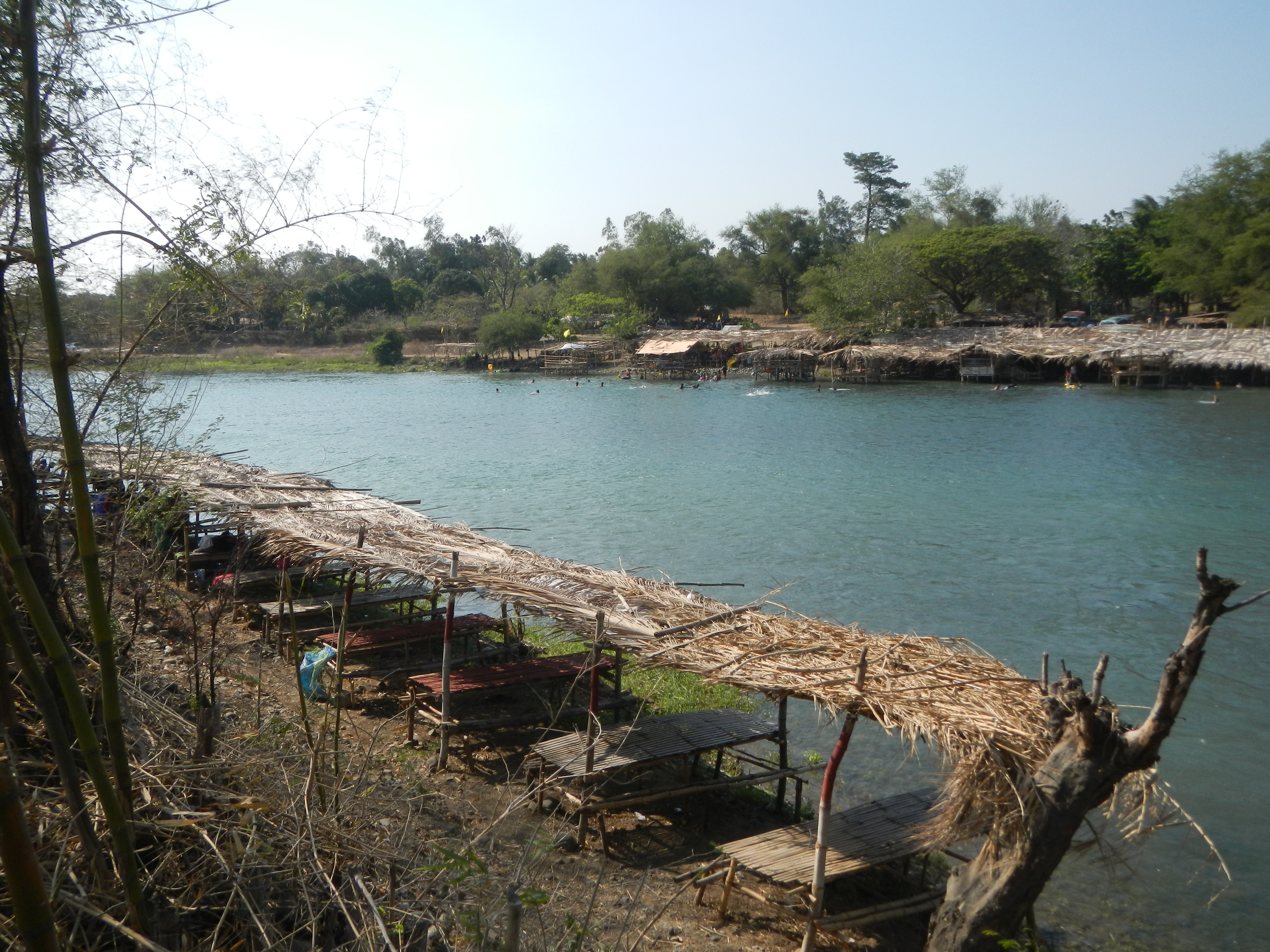
Angat River (also known as Bakas River) from Amador C. Dela Merced Bridge in Norzagaray

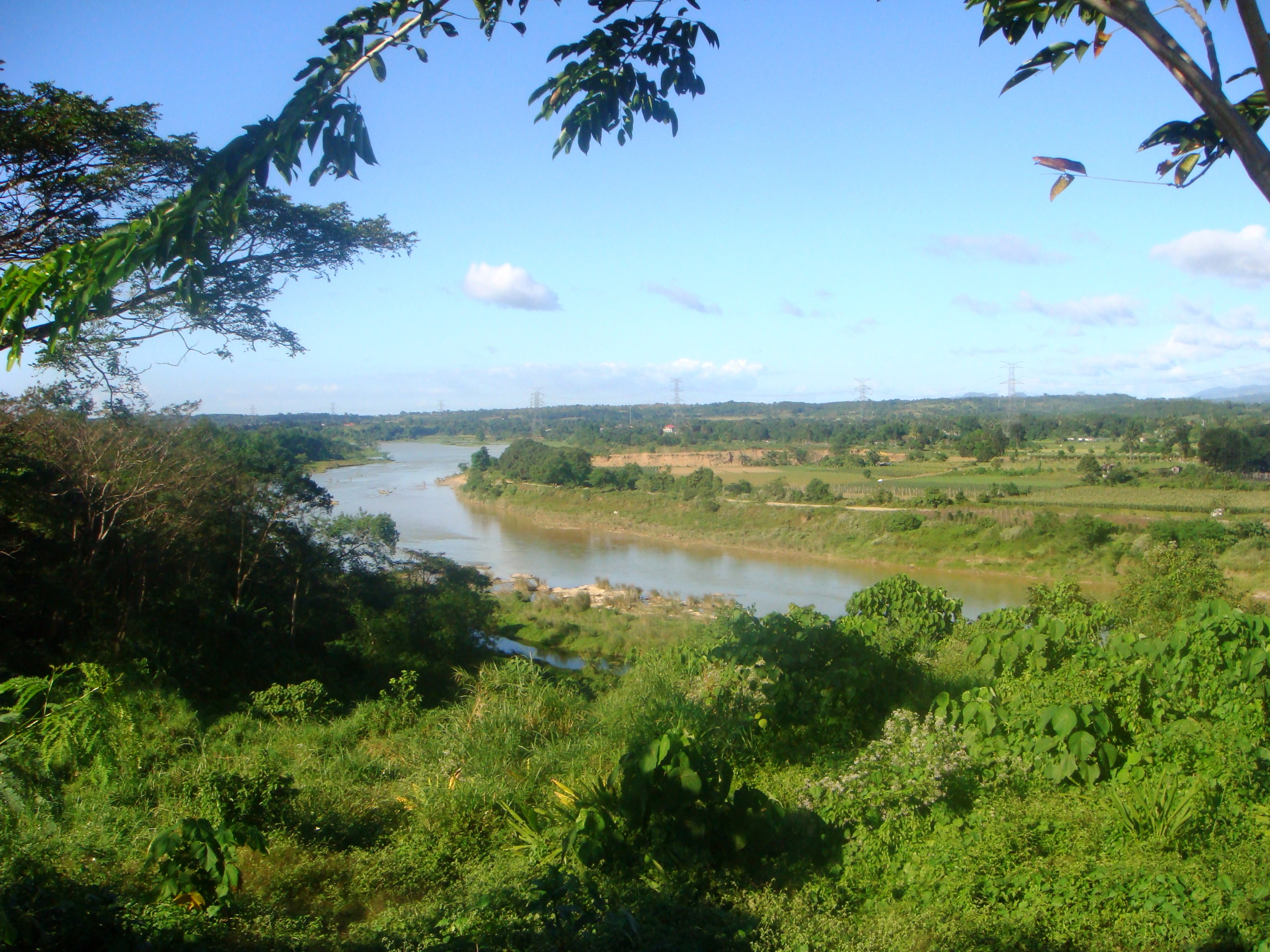
Angat River from Angat, Bulacan "Overlooking View"

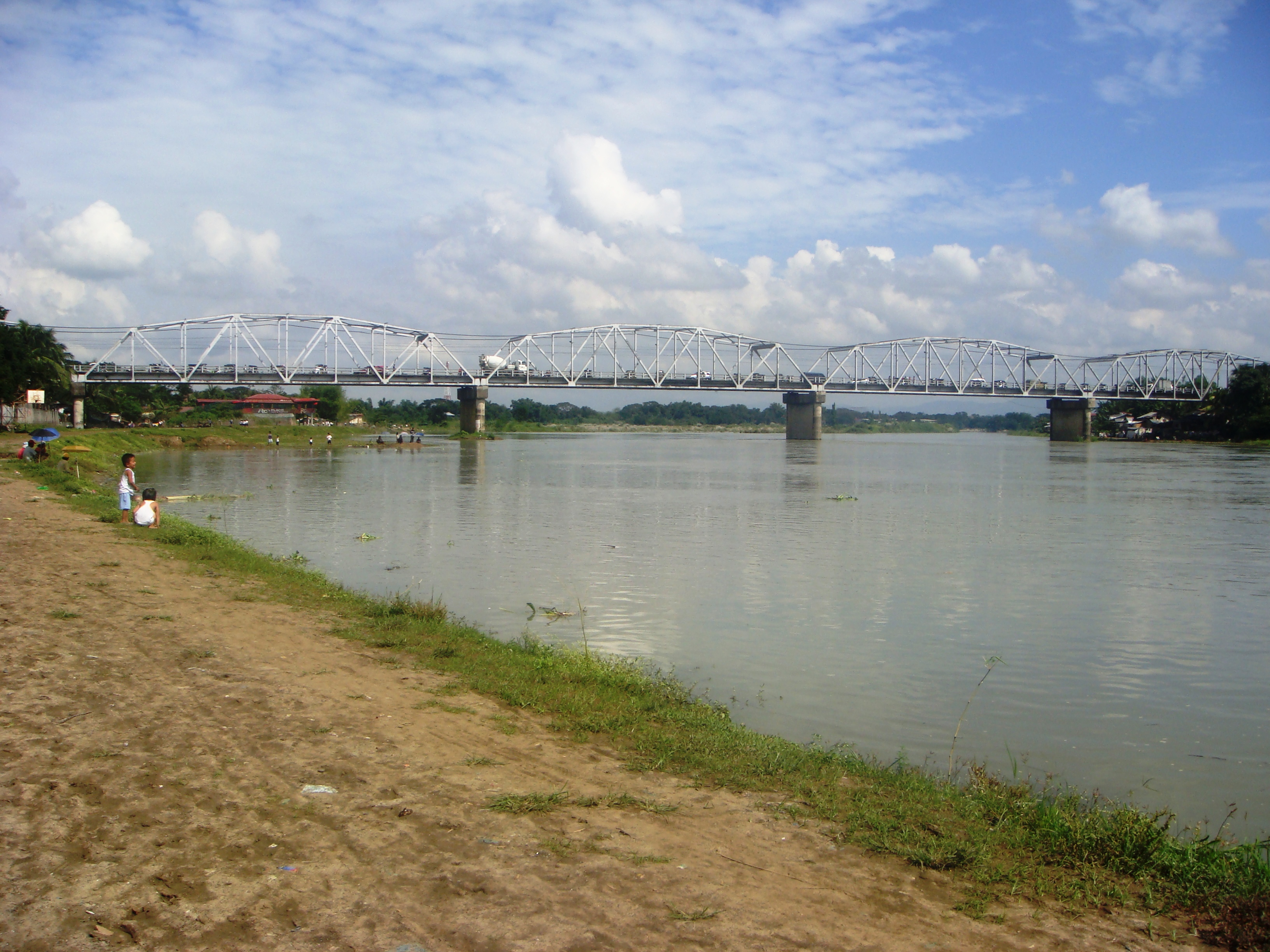
Angat River & Gen. Alejo S. Santos (Baliwag – Bustos) bridge

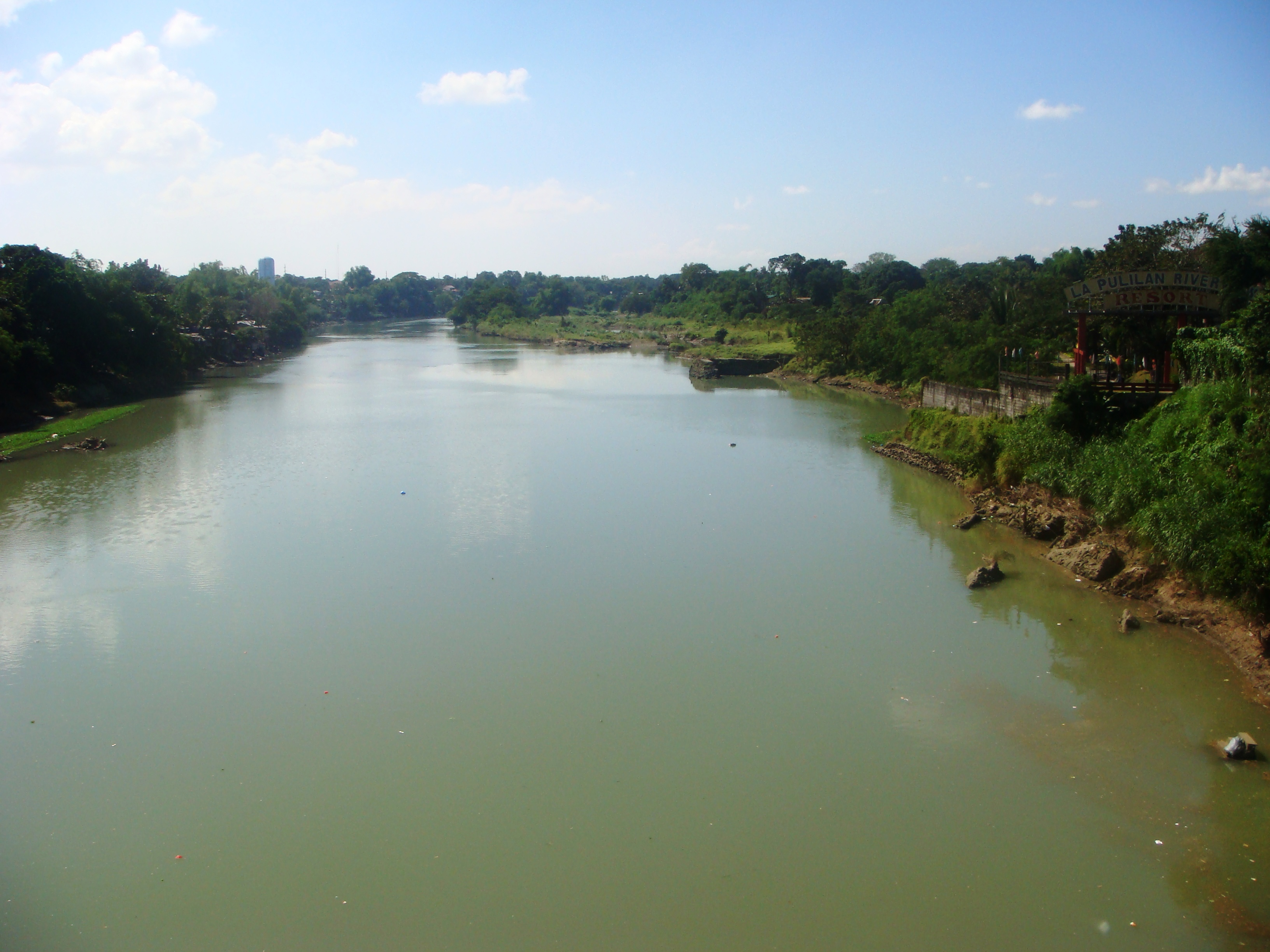
La Pulilan Resort and Angat River from Pulilan-Plaridel Bridge

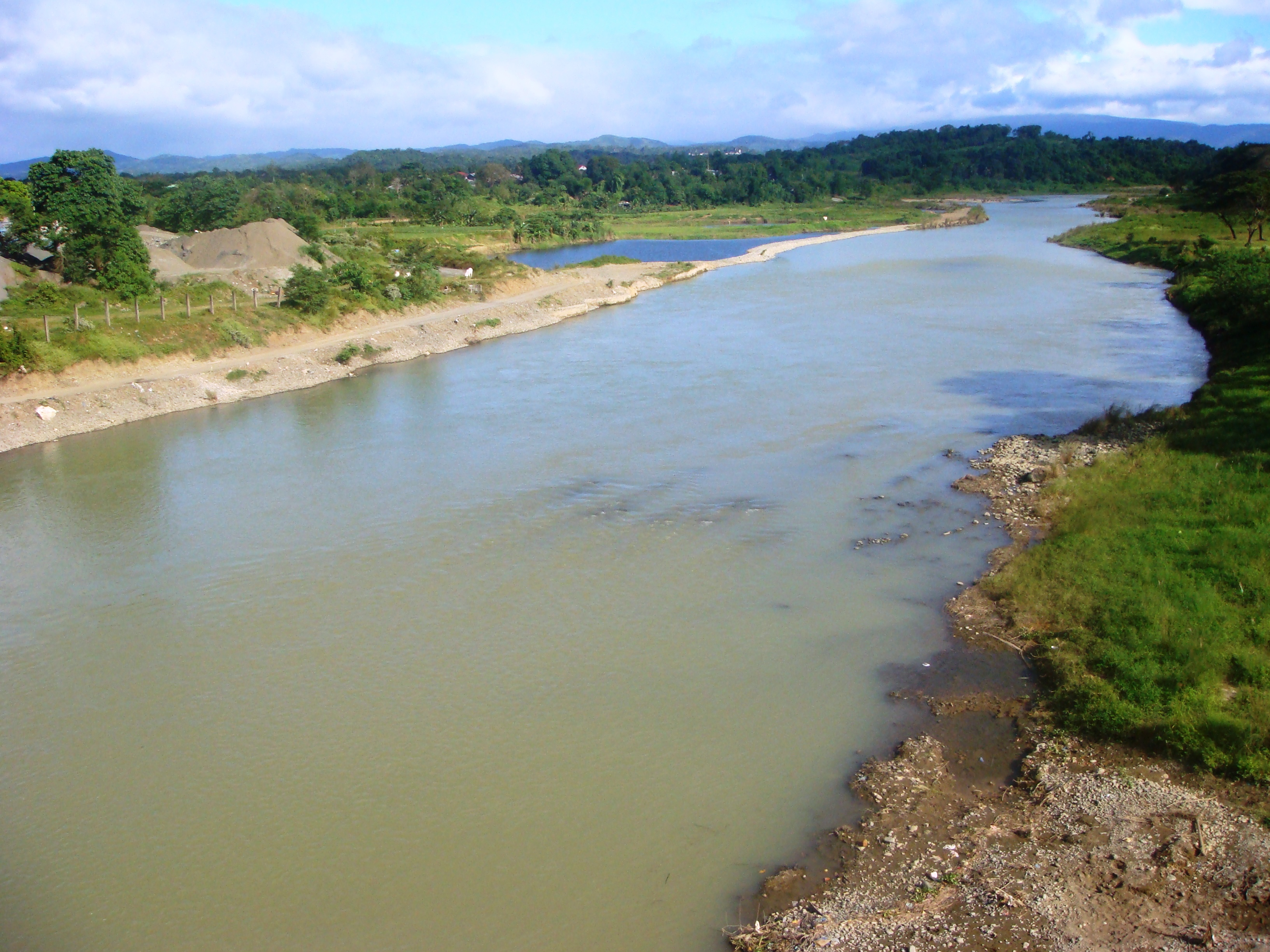
Angat River (also known as Quingua River) (overview from Angat bridge)
