= 2010 Bulacan local elections =

2010 Bulacan gubernatorial election
- May 10, 2010
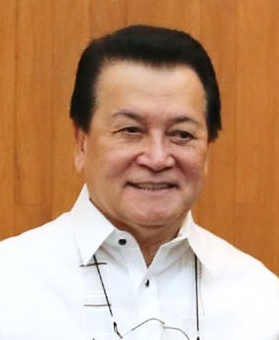

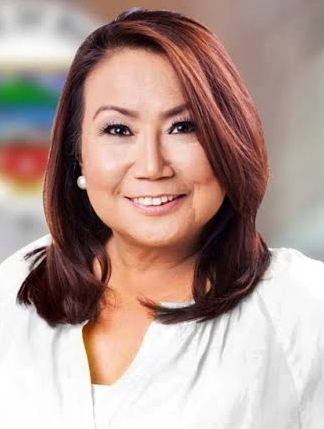
Nominee	Wilhelmino Sy-Alvarado	Josefina Dela Cruz
Party	Lakas–Kampi	Liberal
Running mate	Daniel Fernando	Pacifico Aniag
Popular vote	533,527	492,468
Percentage	51.21%	47.27%
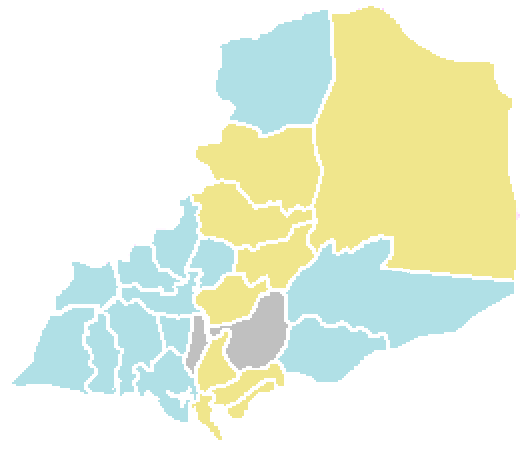
- The candidate that got the majority in each municipality and city. Balagtas and Santa Maria failed to transmit the results electronically.
Governor before election
Joselito Mendoza
Liberal
Elected Governor
Wilhelmino Sy-Alvarado
Lakas–Kampi

Local elections were held in the province of Bulacan on May 10, 2010, as part of the 2010 general election. Voters selected candidates for all local positions: a town mayor, vice mayor and town councilors, as well as members of the Sangguniang Panlalawigan, the vice-governor, governor and representatives for the four districts of Bulacan.

== Results ==
The candidates for governor and vice governor with the highest number of votes wins the seat; they are voted separately, therefore, they may be of different parties when elected.

=== Gubernatorial election ===
Bulacan Gubernatorial election
Party	Candidate	Votes	%
Lakas–Kampi	Wilhelmino Sy-Alvarado	533,527	51.21
Liberal	Josefina dela Cruz	492,468	47.27
PGRP	Miguel Esguerra	11,212	1.08
Independent	Santos Caperlac	4,711	0.45
Total votes		1,041,918	100
Lakas–Kampi gain from Liberal			

=== Vice gubernatorial election ===
Bulacan Vice-Gubernatorial election
Party	Candidate	Votes	%
Lakas–Kampi	Daniel Fernando	538,336	55.42
Liberal	Pacifico "Boy" Aniag	326,099	33.57
Independent	Serafin dela Cruz	91,935	9.47
Independent	Mayeth Cruz	14,933	1.54
Total votes		971,303	100
Lakas–Kampi hold			

=== Congressional elections ===
Each of Bulacan's four legislative districts will elect each representative to the House of Representatives. The candidate with the highest number of votes wins the seat.

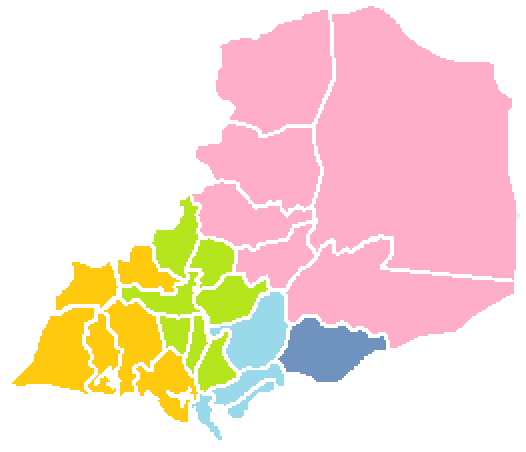
Legislative districts of Bulacan, including San Jose del Monte.

Malolos was given its own congressional seat from Bulacan's 1st district by virtue of Republic Act 9591. However, the Supreme Court ruled it unconstitutional, saying it violated Article VI Section 5 (3) of the Constitution and Section 3 of the Ordinance attached to constitution; Malolos was ruled not to have exceeded the 250,000 population for a separate legislative district.

In Bulacan, members of the same families will run against each other. Former governor Josie dela Cruz established the Del Pilar party (named after Gregorio del Pilar) as the local affiliate of the Liberal Party.

==== 1st District ====
Ma. Victoria Sy-Alvarado is the incumbent. She will face Roberto Pagdanganan.

Malolos was supposed to have its own representation in the House of Representatives, but was ruled unconstitutional by the Supreme Court for the city did not have enough population to be given separate representation. Malolos residents will continue to be represented as a part of Bulacan's 1st district.

Philippine House of Representatives election at Bulacan's 1st district
Party	Candidate	Votes	%
Lakas–Kampi	Ma. Victoria Sy-Alvarado	118,486	71.38
Nacionalista	Roberto Pagdanganan	47,515	28.62
Total votes		166,001	100
Election deferred, to be held on November 13, 2010.

===== Special election =====
The COMELEC ruled that candidates that contested the Bulacan-1st and Malolos will contest the seat. Aniag and Domingo withdrew prior to the election, while independents Cruz and Valencia did not campaign.

Philippine House of Representatives special election at Bulacan's 1st district
Party	Candidate	Votes	%
Lakas–Kampi	Ma. Victoria Sy-Alvarado	95,625	68.77
Nacionalista	Roberto Pagdanganan	41,658	29.96
Liberal	Danilo Domingo (withdrew)	1,032	0.74
PMP	Francisco Aniag (withdrew)	400	0.29
Independent	Tomas Valencia	271	0.19
Independent	Francisco Cruz	63	0.05
Turnout			40.73
Total votes		139,049	100
Lakas–Kampi hold			

==== 2nd District ====
Pedro Pancho is the incumbent. He will face 2007 challenger and former three-term Guiguinto, Bulacan mayor Ambrosio "Boy" Cruz Jr.

Philippine House of Representatives election at Bulacan's 2nd district
Party	Candidate	Votes	%
Lakas–Kampi	Pedro Pancho	145,133	53.99
Liberal	Ambrosio Cruz Jr.	118,489	44.07
Independent	Jaime Villafuerte	5,215	1.94
Total votes		268,837	100
Lakas–Kampi hold			

==== 3rd District ====
Incumbent Lorna Silverio is in her third consecutive term already and is ineligible for reelection. She will run for mayor of San Rafael and her husband, Ricardo Silverio, Sr. will run for her seat. His opponents are his son, Ricardo "Ricky" Silverio, Jr. and the current governor of Bulacan: Joselito Mendoza.

Philippine House of Representatives election at Bulacan's 3rd district
Party	Candidate	Votes	%
Liberal	Joselito Andrew Mendoza	121,576	55.07
Lakas–Kampi	Ricardo Silverio	92,951	42.10
PMP	Ricardo Silverio, Jr.	6,241	2.83
Total votes		220,768	100
Liberal gain from Lakas–Kampi			

==== 4th District ====
Reylina Nicolas (Lakas-Kampi-CMD) is in her third consecutive term already and is ineligible for reelection.

Philippine House of Representatives election at Bulacan's 4th district
Party	Candidate	Votes	%
Liberal	Linabelle Ruth Villarica	178,643	81.01
Lakas–Kampi	Salvador Pleyto	27,072	12.28
PDP–Laban	Jovel Lopez	14,807	6.71
Total votes		220,522	100
Liberal gain from Lakas–Kampi			

==== Malolos ====
With the issue on Malolos' separate congressional district from Bulacan's 1st district resolved with finality, an election will be scheduled to elect the representative for Bulacan's 1st district, including Malolos."

Voting for Malolos' congressional district was continued. The results:

Philippine House of Representatives election at Malolos
Party	Candidate	Votes	%
Liberal	Danilo Domingo	34,408	60.70
PMP	Francisco Aniag	18,488	32.61
Independent	Francisco Cruz	2,278	4.02
Independent	Tomas Valencia	1,512	2.67
Valid ballots		56,686	68.90
Invalid or blank votes		25,584	15.74
Total votes		82,270	100.00
Election invalidated; election to be held as part of Bulacan–1st on November 13.

==== San Jose del Monte ====
San Jose del Monte is a component city of Bulacan. Arthur Robes is the incumbent.

Philippine House of Representatives election at San Jose del Monte
Party	Candidate	Votes	%
Lakas–Kampi	Arthur Robes	98,888	82.11
Aksyon	Oscar Robes	19,554	16.24
Independent	Jesus Gonzales	1,255	1.04
Independent	Rene Avellanosa	732	0.61
Total votes		120,429	100
Lakas–Kampi hold			

=== Sangguniang Panlalawigan elections ===
All 4 Districts of Bulacan will elect Sangguniang Panlalawigan or provincial board members. The first (including Malolos) and fourth (including San Jose del Monte) districts sends three board members each, while the second and third districts sends two board members each. Election is via plurality-at-large voting; a voter can vote up to the maximum number of board members his district is sending.

The Liberal Party won seven out of the ten partisan seats in the provincial council, with Lakas Kampi CMD winning two, and the Nacionalista Party winning one; only the Liberals and Lakas-Kampi parties fielded complete lineups in the provincial board elections. An additional three more members will be selected from the provincial chapter of the barangay captains, Sangguniang Kabataan, and the sectoral representative.

==== Summary ====
Party	Votes	%	Seats
Liberal Party	1,033,450	51.86	7
Lakas-Kampi-CMD	611,413	30.68	2
Nacionalista Party	144,679	7.26	1
PDP–Laban	37,450	1.88	0
Pwersa ng Masang Pilipino	35,825	1.80	0
Independent	129,848	6.52	0
Ex officio seats			3
Total	1,992,665	100.00	13
Total votes	1,158,982	–	

==== 1st District ====
Bulacan 1st District Sangguniang Panlalawigan election
Party	Candidate	Votes	%
Liberal	Michael Fermin	111,813	20.17
Nacionalista	Felix Ople	109,927	19.83
Lakas–Kampi	Therese Ople	91,112	16.43
Liberal	Victorino Aldaba, Jr.	83,427	15.05
Lakas–Kampi	Vicente Cruz	75,248	13.57
Independent	Emmanuel Sacay	70,894	12.79
Lakas–Kampi	Ryan Espiritu	7,612	1.37
Independent	Alberto Carasig	4,408	0.80
Total votes		554,441	100

==== 2nd District ====
Bulacan 2nd District Sangguniang Panlalawigan election
Party	Candidate	Votes	%
Liberal	Ramon Posadas	120,728	30.96
Liberal	Enrique dela Cruz, Jr.	110,271	28.28
Lakas–Kampi	Norielito German	69,538	17.83
Lakas–Kampi	Cecilia Quimpo	38,048	9.76
PMP	Jose Francisco Rivera	22,971	5.89
Independent	Lydia Abad	15,522	3.98
PMP	Francisco Concepcion	12,854	3.30
Total votes		389,932	100

==== 3rd District ====
Bulacan 3rd District Sangguniang Panlalawigan election
Party	Candidate	Votes	%
Liberal	Rino Castro	98,122	29.65
Liberal	Enrique Viudez II	77,782	23.50
Lakas–Kampi	Richard dela Cruz	67,630	20.43
Lakas–Kampi	Victoriano Cruz	50,141	15.15
Nacionalista	Carmencita Martinez	34,752	10.50
Independent	Leo Babasa	2,536	0.77
Total votes		330,963	100

==== 4th District ====
Bulacan 4th District Sangguniang Panlalawigan election
Party	Candidate	Votes	%
Liberal	Eulogio Sarmiento III	164,597	22.95
Liberal	Enrique delos Santos, Jr.	163,763	22.83
Lakas–Kampi	Romeo Allan Robes	104,668	14.59
Liberal	Danilo Certeza	102,947	14.53
Lakas–Kampi	Zosimo Lorenzo	55,077	7.68
Lakas–Kampi	Ireneo Tan	52,339	7.30
PDP–Laban	Romeo Almario	37,450	5.22
Independent	Ronald Garcia	22,759	3.17
Independent	Rodello Tactac	13,729	1.91
Total votes		717,329	100

=== Mayoralty elections ===
All cities and municipalities of Bulacan will elect mayor and vice-mayor this election. The candidates for mayor and vice mayor with the highest number of votes wins the seat; they are voted separately, therefore, they may be of different parties when elected. Below is the list of mayoralty and vice mayoralty candidates of each city and municipalities per district.

==== 1st District ====
- City: Malolos
- Municipalities: Bulacan, Calumpit, Hagonoy, Paombong, Pulilan

==== City of Malolos ====
Incumbent Danilo Domingo ran as representative of the district of Malolos.

Malolos City mayoralty election
Party	Candidate	Votes	%
Del Pilar	Christian Natividad	43,088	53.73
Liberal	Alejandro Tengco	26,015	32.44
Nacionalista	Carolina Mangawang	11,096	13.84
Total votes		80,199	100
Del Pilar gain from Liberal			

Malolos City vice mayoralty election
Party	Candidate	Votes	%
Del Pilar	Gilbert Gatchalian	36,461	47.71
Liberal	Dennis San Diego	34,178	44.72
Nacionalista	Norberto Bulaong	5,785	7.57
Total votes		76,324	100
Del Pilar hold			

==== Bulakan ====
Anacleto Meneses is the incumbent.

Bulakan, Bulacan mayoralty election
Party	Candidate	Votes	%
Liberal	Patrick Neil Meneses	17,793	52.95
Nacionalista	Vicente Enriquez	15,809	47.05
Total votes		33,602	100
Liberal hold			

Bulakan, Bulacan vice mayoralty election
Party	Candidate	Votes	%
Liberal	Alberto Bituin	16,407	50.28
Nacionalista	Leocardio Mendoza	13,100	40.15
Independent	Rizaldy Samonte	3,122	9.57
Total votes		32,629	100
Liberal hold			

==== Calumpit ====
James P. De Jesus is the incumbent mayor.

Calumpit mayoralty election
Party	Candidate	Votes	%
Liberal	James de Jesus	35,415	100
Total votes		35,415	100
Liberal hold			

Calumpit vice mayoralty election
Party	Candidate	Votes	%
PMP	Zacarias Candelaria	19,894	50.27
Liberal	Alner Lim Rañola	19,684	49.73
Total votes		39,578	100
PMP gain from Liberal			

==== Hagonoy ====
Angel Cruz, Jr. is the incumbent.

Hagonoy mayoralty election
Party	Candidate	Votes	%
Lapiang K	Angel Cruz, Jr.	29,089	58.75
Lakas–Kampi	Pedro Santos, Jr.	10,770	21.75
PMP	Hermogenes Perez, Sr.	9,653	19.50
Total votes		49,512	100
Lapiang K hold			

Hagonoy vice mayoralty election
Party	Candidate	Votes	%
Del Pilar	Reynaldo Santos	24,347	50.59
Lapiang K	Dalisay Ople	13,161	27.35
Nacionalista	Elmer Santos	10,619	22.06
Total votes		48,127	100
Del Pilar gain from Nacionalista			

==== Paombong ====
Donato Marcos is the incumbent.

Paombong mayoralty election
Party	Candidate	Votes	%
Liberal	Donato Marcos	12,525	59.69
Lakas–Kampi	Manuela Gonzales	8,427	40.16
Independent	Efren Milanes	33	0.16
Total votes		20,985	100
Liberal hold			

Paombong vice mayoralty election
Party	Candidate	Votes	%
Lakas–Kampi	Marisa Ramos	10,142	50.64
Liberal	Arnaldo Mendoza	9,884	49.36
Total votes		20,026	100
Lakas–Kampi hold			

==== Pulilan ====
Incumbent Vicente Esguerra running for his second term. He is running against former Vice Governor Aurelio Plamenco.

Pulilan mayoralty election
Party	Candidate	Votes	%
Liberal	Vicente Esguerra, Sr.	22,050	56.11
Lakas–Kampi	Aurelio Plamenco	9,901	25.20
Ang Kapatiran	Felix Navarro	7,233	18.41
Independent	Emelita Pilapil	111	0.28
Total votes		39,295	100
Liberal hold			

Pulilan vice mayoralty election
Party	Candidate	Votes	%
Liberal	Elpidio Castillo	16,550	42.78
Ang Kapatiran	Encarnacion Peralta	14,537	37.57
Lakas–Kampi	Marcelo Enriquez	5,062	13.08
PMP	Delfin Plamenco	2,339	6.05
Independent	Victoria Sayo	201	0.52
Total votes		38,689	100
Liberal hold			

==== 2nd District ====
- Municipalities: Balagtas, Baliuag, Bocaue, Bustos, Guiguinto, Pandi, Plaridel

==== Balagtas ====
Romeo Castro is the incumbent.

Balagtas mayoralty election
Party	Candidate	Votes	%
Liberal	Romeo Castro	18,821	72.75
Independent	Feliciano Cruz, Jr.	7,049	27.25
Total votes		25,870	100
Liberal hold			

Balagtas vice mayoralty election
Party	Candidate	Votes	%
Liberal	Emmanuel Galvez	12,916	48.67
Independent	Jessie Santiago	7,523	28.35
Independent	Joselito Polintan	6,101	22.99
Total votes		26,540	100
Liberal hold			

==== Baliuag ====
Incumbent Romeo Estrella is running for his third and last term.

Baliuag mayoralty election
Party	Candidate	Votes	%
Del Pilar	Romeo Estrella	23,398	37.54
Nacionalista	Ferdinand Cruz	13,858	22.23
Lakas–Kampi	Christopher Clemente	13,457	21.59
Liberal	Rolando Salvador	11,614	18.63
Total votes		62,327	100
Del Pilar hold			

Baliuag vice mayoralty election
Party	Candidate	Votes	%
Independent	Antonio Patawaran	17,094	28.50
Del Pilar	Luis del Rosario	16,683	27.82
Independent	Luciano Robes	11,915	19.87
Lakas–Kampi	Generoso Ligon	11,021	18.38
Nacionalista	Macario Silva	3,259	5.43
Total votes		59,972	100
Independent gain from Nacionalista			

==== Bocaue ====
Eduardo Villanueva, Jr. is the incumbent.

Bocaue mayoralty election
Party	Candidate	Votes	%
Bangon Pilipinas	Eduardo Villanueva, Jr.	22,446	51.96
Nacionalista	Kennedy Valdez	20,511	47.48
Independent	Gregorio dela Cruz, Sr.	242	0.56
Total votes		43,199	100
Bangon Pilipinas hold			

Bocaue vice mayoralty election
Party	Candidate	Votes	%
Bangon Pilipinas	Jose Santiago, Jr.	27,793	68.32
Nacionalista	Juanito Robles	12,889	31.68
Total votes		40,682	100
Bangon Pilipinas gain from Nacionalista			

==== Bustos ====
Carlito Reyes is the incumbent.

Bustos mayoralty election
Party	Candidate	Votes	%
Liberal	Arnel Mendoza	12,215	45.09
Del Pilar	Carlito Reyes	8,773	32.39
PMP	Edgardo Cunanan	3,789	13.99
Independent	Teodorico Gervacio	1,409	5.20
Aksyon	Jaime Sebastian	903	3.33
Total votes		27,089	100
Liberal gain from Del Pilar			

Bustos vice mayoralty election
Party	Candidate	Votes	%
Del Pilar	Loida Rivera	9,458	35.95
Independent	Leonardo Leoncio	7,727	29.37
Independent	Juanito Bernardo	4,184	15.90
Lakas–Kampi	Jennifer Villaroman	1,986	7.55
PMP	Rodolfo Perez	1,787	6.79
Aksyon	Henry Capio	1,165	4.43
Total votes		26,307	100
Del Pilar hold			

==== Guiguinto ====
Isagani Pascual is the incumbent.

Guiguinto mayoralty election
Party	Candidate	Votes	%
Del Pilar	Isagani Pascual	21,084	57.55
Liberal	Eliseo Santos, Jr.	15,549	42.45
Total votes		36,633	100
Del Pilar hold			

Guiguinto vice mayoralty election
Party	Candidate	Votes	%
Del Pilar	Estrelita Aballa	22,031	62.49
Liberal	Araceli Villanueva	13,227	37.51
Total votes		35,258	100
Del Pilar hold			

==== Pandi ====
Incumbent Oliver Andres is running for a full term after succeeding late mayor Roberto Oca.

Pandi mayoralty election
Party	Candidate	Votes	%
Lakas–Kampi	Enrico Roque	18,362	54.38
Nacionalista	Oliver Andres	15,403	45.62
Total votes		33,765	100
Lakas–Kampi gain from Nacionalista			

Pandi vice mayoralty election
Party	Candidate	Votes	%
PMP	Maria Rachel Oca	19,072	58.47
Nacionalista	Gavino Austria	13,546	41.53
Total votes		32,618	100
PMP hold			

==== Plaridel ====
Incumbent Anastacia Vistan is running unopposed.

Plaridel mayoralty election
Party	Candidate	Votes	%
Liberal	Anastacia Vistan	34,415	100
Total votes		34,415	100
Liberal hold			

Plaridel vice mayoralty election
Party	Candidate	Votes	%
Liberal	Leonilo Yap	32,263	100
Total votes		32,263	100
Liberal hold			

==== 3rd District ====
- Municipalities: Angat, Doña Remedios Trinidad, Norzagaray, San Ildefonso, San Miguel, San Rafael

==== Angat ====
Incumbent Leonardo de Leon was term-limited and ran for vice mayor.

Angat mayoralty election
Party	Candidate	Votes	%
Liberal	Gilberto Santos	13,236	53.96
Independent	Apolonio Marcelo, Jr.	11,294	46.04
Total votes		24,530	100
Liberal hold			

Angat vice mayoralty election
Party	Candidate	Votes	%
Liberal	Leonardo de Leon	14,376	59.32
Nacionalista	Czarina Rose del Rosario	9,858	40.68
Total votes		24,234	100
Liberal hold			

==== Doña Remedios Trinidad ====
Incumbent Evelyn Paulino is term-limited.

Doña Remedios Trinidad mayoralty election
Party	Candidate	Votes	%
Liberal	Ronaldo Flores	6,288	56.71
Lakas–Kampi	Liberato Sembrano	4,766	42.98
Independent	Sherlin Ramirez	21	0.19
Independent	Jose Valencia	13	0.12
Total votes		11,088	100
Liberal gain from Lakas–Kampi			

Doña Remedios Trinidad vice mayoralty election
Party	Candidate	Votes	%
Liberal	Jayvie Manalo	4,780	44.65
Lakas–Kampi	Carlo Miguel Paulino	4,212	39.35
Independent	Leobardo Piadozo	1,669	15.59
Independent	Vilma dela Cruz	44	0.41
Total votes		10,705	100
Liberal gain from Lakas–Kampi			

==== Norzagaray ====
Felicano Legaspi is the incumbent.

Norzagray mayoralty election
Party	Candidate	Votes	%
Lakas–Kampi	Feliciano Legaspi	21,642	54.95
Liberal	Roberto Esquivel	17,740	45.05
Total votes		39,382	100
Lakas–Kampi hold			

Norzagray vice mayoralty election
Party	Candidate	Votes	%
Lakas–Kampi	Rogelio Santos, Jr.	20,484	54.20
Liberal	Ma. Cleope Pelayo	17,306	45.80
Total votes		37,790	100
Lakas–Kampi hold			

==== San Ildefonso ====
Incumbent Edgardo Galvez is term-limited.

San Ildefonso mayoralty election
Party	Candidate	Votes	%
Liberal	Paula Carla Tan	25,215	55.86
NPC	Nemencio Rivera	16,300	36.11
Lakas–Kampi	Lolita Mapoy	3,623	8.03
Total votes		45,138	100
Liberal hold			

San Ildefonso vice mayoralty election
Party	Candidate	Votes	%
Liberal	Rolando Centeno	17,148	40.57
NPC	Leopoldo Jimenez	15,250	36.08
Lakas–Kampi	Benedicto Duran	9,867	23.35
Total votes		42,265	100
Liberal hold			

==== San Miguel ====
Roderick Tiongson is the incumbent.

San Miguel mayoralty election
Party	Candidate	Votes	%
Liberal	Roderick Tiongson	34,152	55.15
Lakas–Kampi	Allen David dela Cruz	25,750	41.58
PMP	Edmundo Jose Buencamino	1,322	2.13
Independent	Juanito Tuason, Jr.	647	1.04
Independent	Anthony Viola	55	0.09
Total votes		61,926	100
Liberal hold			

San Miguel vice mayoralty election
Party	Candidate	Votes	%
Liberal	Ma. Gemma Alcantara	33,932	57.93
Lakas–Kampi	John Mendez	19,551	33.38
Independent	Felipe Miguel Buencamino	5,094	8.70
Total votes		58,577	100
Liberal gain from Lakas–Kampi			

==== San Rafael ====
Ricardo Silverio is the incumbent.

San Rafael mayoralty election
Party	Candidate	Votes	%
Lakas–Kampi	Lorna Silverio	22,345	54.25
Del Pilar	Jesus Viceo	18,844	45.75
Total votes		41,189	100
Lakas–Kampi hold			

San Rafael vice mayoralty election
Party	Candidate	Votes	%
Lakas–Kampi	Cipriano Violago, Jr.	23,241	60.03
Del Pilar	Rosemarie Inoncillo	14,760	38.12
Independent	Augusto dela Fuente	717	1.85
Total votes		38,718	100
Lakas–Kampi hold			

==== 4th District ====
- Cities: Meycauayan
- Municipalities: Marilao, Obando, Santa Maria

==== Marilao ====
Incumbent Epifanio Guillermo is running for his last term against DZMM radio anchor Neil Ocampo.

Marilao mayoralty election
Party	Candidate	Votes	%
Liberal	Epifanio Guillermo	34,588	63.73
Nacionalista	Neil Ocampo	18,065	33.29
PMP	Juanito Zamora	1,620	2.98
Total votes		54,273	100
Liberal hold			

Marilao vice mayoralty election
Party	Candidate	Votes	%
Liberal	Juanito Santiago	27,251	51.47
Lakas–Kampi	Divina Reyes	25,691	48.53
Total votes		52,942	100
Liberal hold			

==== Meycauayan City ====
Joan Alarilla is the incumbent, his opponent is vice mayor Salvador Violago, Sr.

Meycauayan mayoralty election
Party	Candidate	Votes	%
NPC	Joan Alarilla	43,661	54.05
Nacionalista	Salvador Violago, Sr.	33,168	41.06
Aksyon	Adriano Daez	3,784	4.68
Independent	Rosita Perez	165	0.20
Total votes		80,778	100
NPC hold			

Meycauayan vice mayoralty election
Party	Candidate	Votes	%
NPC	Rafael Manzano, Jr.	34,805	45.12
Aksyon	Manuel Dennis Carlos	24,433	31.68
Nacionalista	Tomas Rosales	12,627	16.37
Independent	Mauro del Rosario	4,755	6.16
Independent	Pablo Milan	514	0.67
Total votes		77,134	100
NPC gain from Nacionalista			

==== Obando ====
Orencio Gabriel is the incumbent.

Obando mayoralty election
Party	Candidate	Votes	%
Liberal	Orencio Gabriel	12,045	42.18
PMP	Edwin Santos	9,494	33.25
Nacionalista	Leonardo Pantanilla	3,752	13.14
Lakas–Kampi	Onesimo Joaquin	3,263	11.43
Total votes		28,554	100
Liberal hold			

Obando vice mayoralty election
Party	Candidate	Votes	%
Liberal	Danilo de Ocampo	12,881	46.84
Nacionalista	Zoilito Santiago	6,339	23.05
PMP	Virgilio Legaspi	4,451	16.18
Lakas–Kampi	Reynaldo Rafael	3,831	13.93
Total votes		27,502	100
Liberal gain from Nacionalista			

==== Santa Maria ====
Bartolome Ramos is the incumbent.

Santa Maria mayoralty election
Party	Candidate	Votes	%
Lakas–Kampi	Bartolome Ramos	28,114	41.82
Liberal	Jesus Mateo	24,125	35.88
KBL	Teofilo Sta. Ana	9,970	14.83
Aksyon	Anselmo Adriano	4,163	6.19
PMP	Esperanza Ramos	860	1.28
Total votes		67,232	100
Lakas–Kampi hold			

Santa Maria vice mayoralty election
Party	Candidate	Votes	%
Lakas–Kampi	Russel Pleyto	31,477	48.36
Liberal	Marisa Tuazon	19,526	30.00
KBL	Miguelito Jose	10,672	16.39
Aksyon	Carolino Lopez, Sr.	2,371	3.64
PMP	Luis Flores	1,048	1.61
Total votes		65,094	100
Lakas–Kampi hold			

==== San Jose del Monte ====
Angelito Sarmiento is the incumbent after succeeding late Eduardo Roquero.

San Jose del Monte mayoralty election
Party	Candidate	Votes	%
Lakas–Kampi	Reynaldo San Pedro	68,995	55.59
Liberal	Angelito Sarmiento	48,509	39.09
PMP	Renato Capa	6,602	5.32
Total votes		124,106	100
Lakas–Kampi gain from Liberal			

San Jose del Monte vice mayoralty election
Party	Candidate	Votes	%
Lakas–Kampi	Eduardo Roquero, Jr.	70,569	58.79
Liberal	Celso Francisco	27,476	22.89
Nacionalista	Enrique delos Santos	19,352	16.12
PMP	Rodrigo dela Peña	2,003	1.67
Independent	Gerardo Gonzalez	640	0.53
Total votes		120,040	100
Lakas–Kampi hold			
