= Ricky Silverio =

Filipino politician from Bulacan

- Born: Ricardo Sison Silverio, Jr. Philippines
- Political party: PMP (2009–present)
- Parent: Ricardo Silverio, Sr. (father); Beatriz Sison (mother)

Ricardo "Ricky" Sison Silverio Jr. is a Filipino politician from Bulacan. He is the son of former Marcos crony Ricardo Silverio, and Beatriz Sison.

== Political career ==
In 2010, Silverio ran as congressman for Bulacan's 3rd district, facing his father who formerly occupied the seat for the said district. But both of them lost to Joselito Mendoza.

In 2019, he ran again for congressman of the same district but lost to incumbent and his stepmother Lorna Silverio.

== Personal life ==
In 2006, he claimed that he was allegedly beaten up and forcibly dragged out of the Urdaneta Village house in Makati that he and his family was residing in by his father's bodyguards. In 2008, Silverio filed a grave coercion case against his father. He was fighting for the ownership rights of the said house. The said house was sold to Chemphil chairman Antonio “Tony” Garcia in 2011.

After the death of his father, he asserted his rights to the estate of his father, but Court of Appeals (CA) denied his petition.

== Electoral performance ==
=== 2019 ===
2019 Philippine House of Representatives election in Bulacan's 3rd District
Party	Candidate	Votes	%
NUP	Lorna Silverio	135,830	51.57
PDP–Laban	Jonjon Mendoza	103,505	39.30
PMP	Ricardo Silverio Jr.	22,630	8.59
Independent	Allan Villena	1,374	0.52
Total votes		263,339	100
NUP hold			

=== 2010 ===
Philippine House of Representatives election at Bulacan's 3rd district
Party	Candidate	Votes	%
Liberal	Joselito Mendoza	121,576	55.07
Lakas–Kampi	Ricardo Silverio, Sr.	92,951	42.10
PMP	Ricardo Silverio, Jr.	6,241	2.83
Total votes		232,038	100.00
Liberal gain from Lakas–Kampi			
