= Bulacan Agricultural State College =

Public agricultural university in Bulacan, Philippines

Bulacan State Agricultural University
- Pambansang Dalubhasaang Pansakahan ng Bulacan (Filipino)
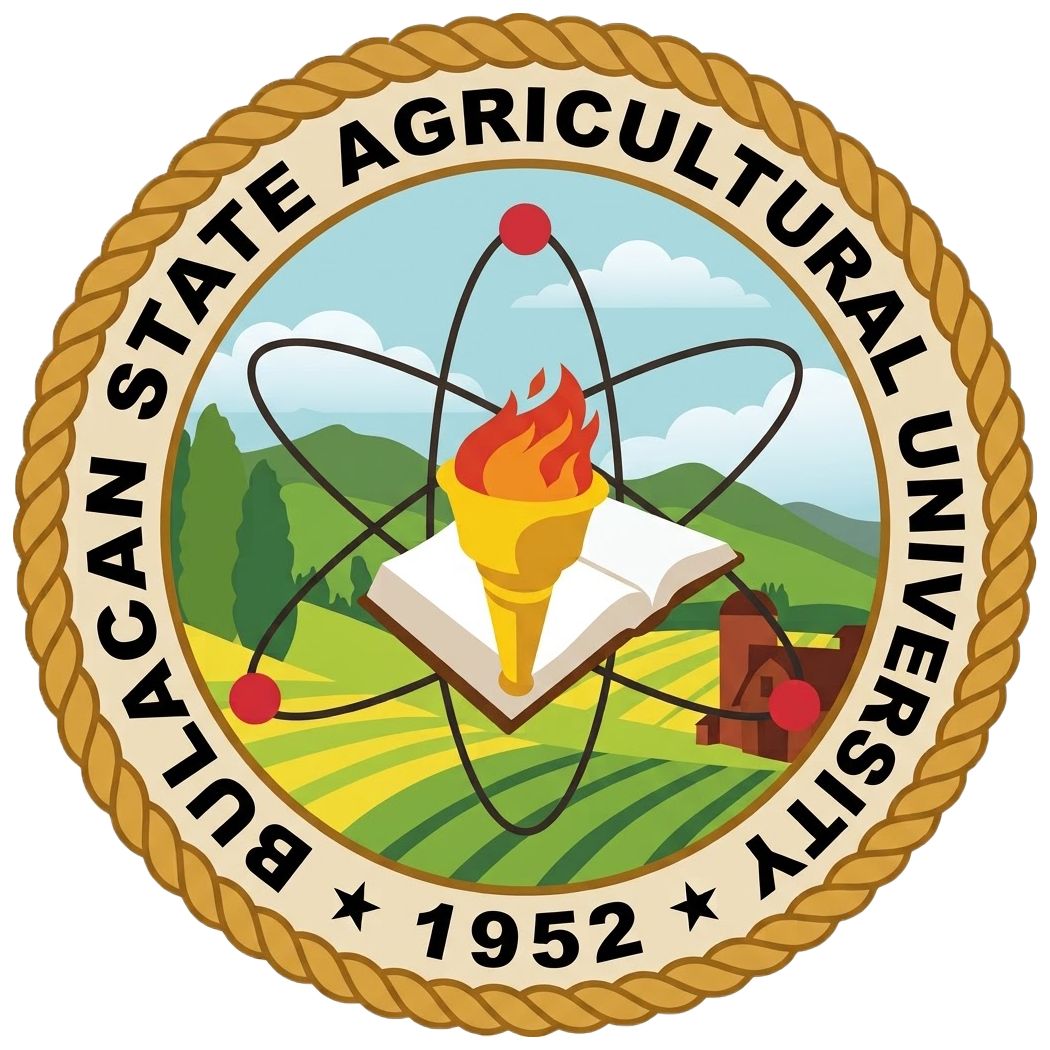
- Former names: Plaridel Community Agricultural High School (1952); Bulacan Provincial Agricultural High School 1952‑1953); Bulacan National Agricultural High School (1953‑1959); Bulacan National Agricultural School (1959‑1998); Bulacan Agricultural State College (1998‑2022)
- Motto: Shaping Minds, Transforming Lives
- Type: State university
- Established: 1952; 74 years ago
- Accreditation: Level III (CHED)
- President: Jameson H. Tan (2019-present)
- Faculty: 300+
- Students: 12,000+
- Location: San Ildefonso, Bulacan, Philippines, San Ildefonso, Bulacan, Philippines; 15°04′21″N 120°57′21″E
- Campus: Rural
- Student newspaper: The Soil Tiller
- Colors: Green; White
- Nicknames: BSAU, BASC
- Sporting affiliations: SCUAA
- Website: basc.edu.ph
- Location in the Philippines

Bulacan State Agricultural University (BSAU) is a state-funded agricultural institution of higher learning located in San Ildefonso, Bulacan, Philippines. It holds the distinction of being the only agricultural higher education institution in the province of Bulacan. The university focuses on agricultural education, research, and community development, serving the educational needs of Central Luzon Region.

== History ==
The institution's history spans over seven decades of continuous evolution and development in agricultural education. Established in 1952 as the Plaridel Community Agricultural High School in Bintog, Plaridel, Bulacan, it initially served 100 students. Through the nationalization of agricultural schools in 1953 under Republic Act 948, the school was transformed first into the Bulacan Provincial Agricultural High School, and then into the Bulacan National Agricultural High School (BNAHS). A significant milestone occurred in 1955 when President Ramon Magsaysay issued Presidential Proclamation 163, allocating 192.5 hectares of the Buenavista Estate in San Ildefonso, Bulacan, for the school's new campus. The institution was further elevated to the Bulacan National Agricultural School (BuNAS) on June 21, 1959, through Republic Act 2416. Nearly four decades later, on February 24, 1998, Republic Act No. 8548 converted BuNAS into the Bulacan Agricultural State College (BASC). This conversion marked its transition into a higher education institution, expanding its capacity to offer degree programs in agriculture and related fields.

On December 1, 2020 then Bulacan 3rd congressional district Representative Lorna Silverio filed House Bill No. 8111 that seeks to convert Bulacan Agricultural State College to a state university that will be called Bulacan Agricultural State University. The bill passed on third reading on January 20, 2021 without opposition. The Senate approved the bill on third reading on January 22, 2022 with amendments. The House concurred on the amendments on February 2, 2022. It was transmitted to the president on April 22, 2022 but the bill lapsed into law on May 29, 2022 as Republic Act No. 11783. Republic Act No. 11783 took effect on July 14, 2022.

=== Leadership and development ===
The institution has been led by four presidents since its conversion to a state college:

Dr. Rolando F. Camacho (December 9, 1998 - December 8, 2002) Dr. Josie A. Valdez (December 9, 2002 - January 31, 2011) Dr. Gerardo Mendoza (February 1, 2011 - January 31, 2019) Dr. Jameson H. Tan (February 1, 2019 - present)

Under their leadership, BASC has achieved significant milestones, including attaining Level III status from the Commission on Higher Education (CHED), placing it among the top 55 out of 106 State Universities and Colleges in the Philippines.

== Campuses and facilities ==
The university operates through a multi-campus system strategically located across Bulacan:

Main Campus (San Ildefonso) The 192.5-hectare main campus houses primary administrative offices and major academic facilities. Located in Brgy. Pinaod, it serves as the central hub for the university's operations.

College of Agriculture Campus (San Ildefonso) Situated in Brgy. Poblacion, this campus specializes in agricultural education and research, featuring experimental farms and agricultural laboratories.

DRT Campus (Doña Remedios Trinidad) Established in 2005 in Brgy. Sapang Bulak, this campus extends the university's reach to the third district of Bulacan, focusing on agricultural and technical education.

Extension Centers

- BTVC-BNAHS Campus (Balagtas, 5th District)
- DepEd Bulacan-FFHNAS Campus (Sta. Maria, 6th District)

These centers operate under memoranda of agreement to provide accessible education to various districts of Bulacan.

== Gallery ==
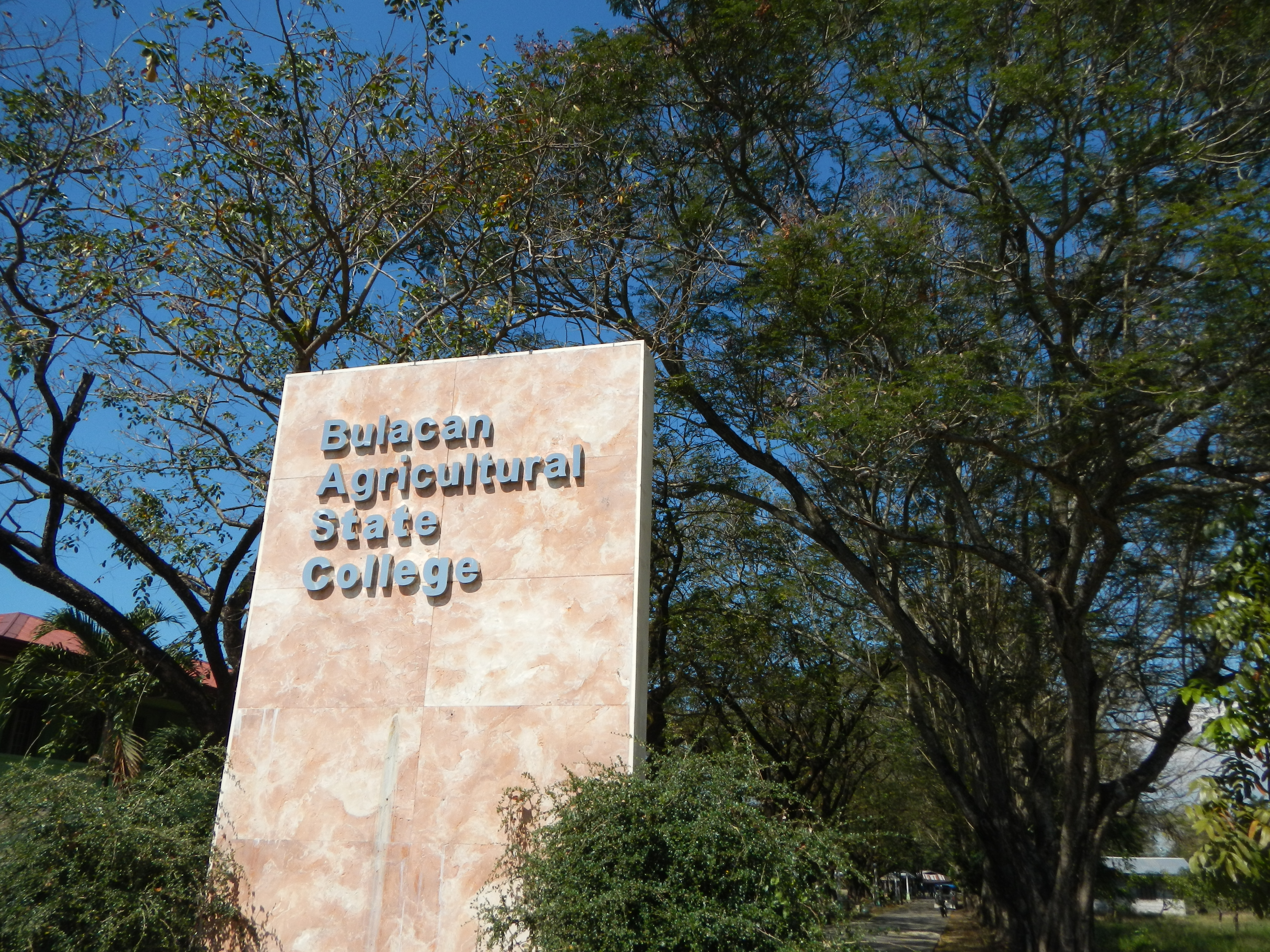
Facade

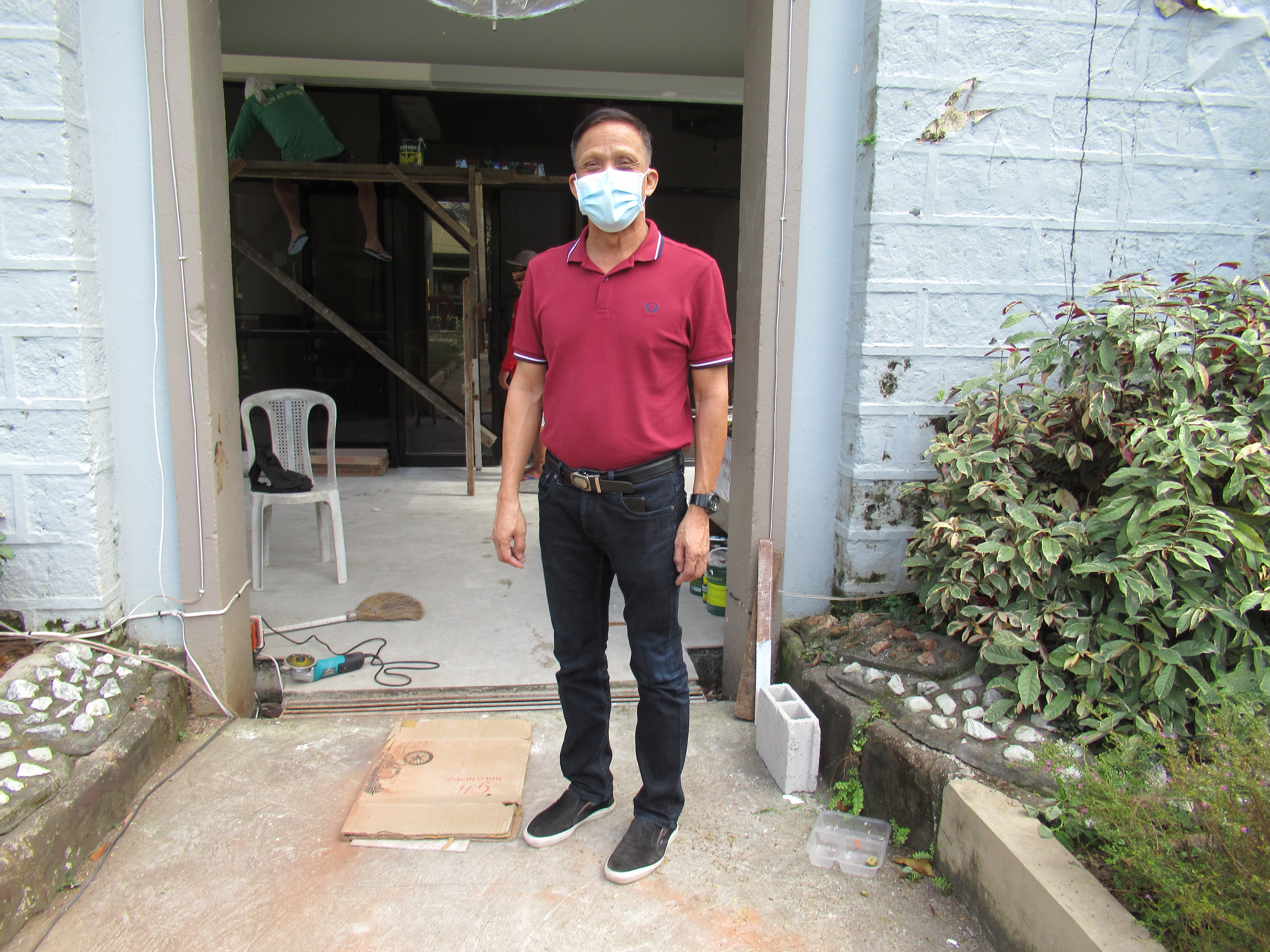
Jameson Hernandez Tan 4th BASC President

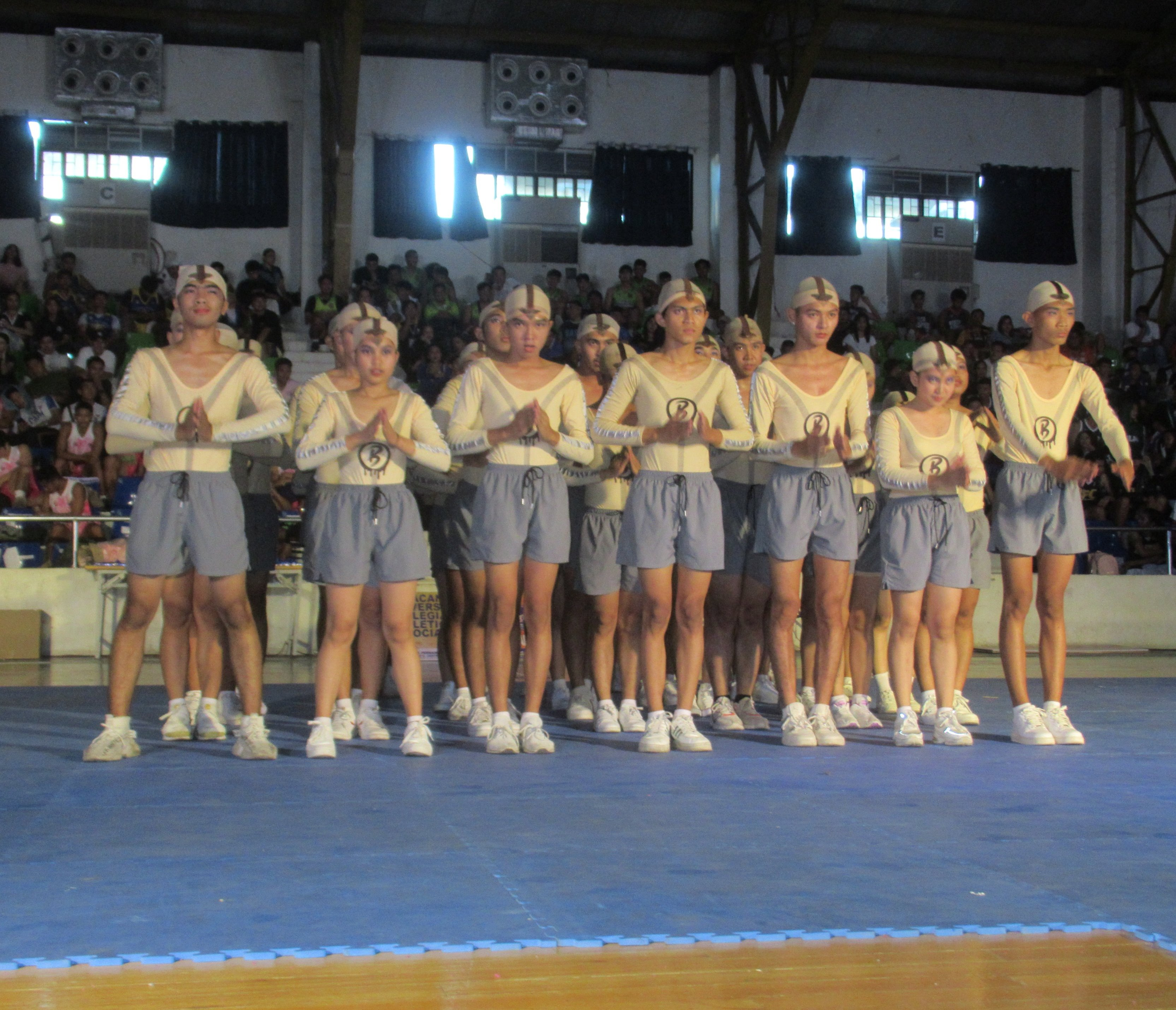
BSAU Cheerleaders competitors, 2024
