= Mayor of San Ildefonso, Bulacan =

- Incumbent; Fernando (Gazo) Galvez since June 30, 2022
- Residence: San Ildefonso Municipal Office
- Seat: Brgy. Poblacion
- Term length: Three years
- First holder: Enrique Viudez II; June 30, 1998

The Mayor of San Ildefonso, Bulacan is the head of government in San Ildefonso, Bulacan.

== Mayor ==
Mayor	Term	Barangay
Romeo V. Venturina		
Enrique Viudez	June 30, 1998 – June 30, 2001	Matimbubong
Edgardo Sazo Galvez	June 30, 2001 – April 23, 2002; June 30, 2004 – June 30, 2010	San Juan
Rogelio Villanueva	June 30, 1986-June 30, 1989	Calawitan
Carla Galvez-Tan	June 30, 2010 – June 30, 2013	San Juan
Gerald Galvez	June 30, 2013 – June 30, 2016	San Juan
Carla Galvez-Tan	June 30, 2016 – 2022	San Juan

== Vice Mayor ==
Vice Mayor	Term	Barangay
Juan Magbitang	June 30, 2001 – June 30, 2007	Poblacion
Rolando Centeno	June 30, 2007 – June 30, 2013	Anyatam
Rogelio Villanueva	June 30, 1989 – June 30, 1992	Calawitan
Robert Miguel	June 30, 2013 – present	Matimbubong
