= Ricardo Silverio =

Filipino businessman and politician (1929–2016)

Mayor of San Rafael, Bulacan
- In office June 30, 2001 – June 30, 2010
- Preceded by: Jessie Viceo
- Succeeded by: Lorna Silverio

Member of the House of Representatives of the Philippines from Bulacan
- In office June 30, 1992 – June 30, 2001
- Preceded by: Jose Cabochan
- Succeeded by: Lorna Silverio
- Constituency: 3rd district

Personal details
- Born: Ricardo Cruz Silverio; November 29, 1929 Bulacan, Philippine Islands
- Died: December 11, 2016 (aged 87) Bulacan, Philippines
- Party: Lakas (1994–2016)
- Other political affiliations: LDP (1991–1994)
- Spouse: Lorna Silverio (m. 1998 until 2016)
- Children: 7 (including Ricky II)
- Relatives: Dante Silverio (nephew)
- Occupation: Politician
- Profession: Businessman

Ricardo Cruz Silverio (November 29, 1929 – December 11, 2016) was a Filipino businessman and politician. He represented the 3rd district of Bulacan in the Philippine House of Representatives from 1992 until 2001, and mayor of San Rafael from 2001 to 2010. He was known among his political constituents as "Tata Carding".

== Business career ==
Silverio started as a salesman of a textile firm in Divisoria, which he later owned.

Silverio founded Delta Motor Corporation in 1962, which assembled and distributed Toyota automobiles in the Philippines. While his company flourished, he became identified as one of Ferdinand Marcos' cronies. The company established the Toyota basketball team, coached by his racecar driver nephew Dante Silverio, and paraded by Robert Jaworski, Ramon Fernandez and Francis Arnaiz. But in 1984 due to political disfavor, Delta Motor Corporation ceased operations and was dissolved in 1988.

Silverio also owned other companies including the now-defunct Air Manila. But due to nationalization of airline in mid-1970s, Air Manila was merged with the Philippine Airlines.

== Congressional career ==
Silverio got elected to the House of Representatives in 1992, represented the 3rd district of Bulacan, and served from 1992 until 2001. He also served as Mayor of San Rafael from 2001 (which he won in close fight) to 2010. He attempt to return to his congressional seat, but lost to Jonjon Mendoza.

== Court cases ==
In 2021, the Sandiganbayan would dismiss the complaint filed by the Presidential Commission on Good Government against the Marcoses, Silverio and his associate Pablo Carlos Jr. for failure to prove allegations against the respondents. The points mentioned in the case included the alleged improper payments of hundreds of thousands of dollars by the two businessmen to the Marcoses in exchange for a contract to supply Kawasaki scrap loaders and Toyota rear dump trucks, grant of three consecutive year special accommodations, privileges, and exemptions from the Central Bank through increased dollar import quota allocation for the importation of Toyota vehicles for Delta Motor and air-conditioning and refrigerating equipment and obtaining a multi-million peso emergency loans as additional capital infusion to Filipinas Bank (Filmanbank), a banking institution owned by Silverio.

== Personal life ==
Silverio was married to Beatriz Sison until her death in 1987. He later married Lorna Cillian (née Javier) on March 27, 1998. She began working as a reservation and ticketing agent for Air Manila in 1968 which Silverio owned. Together, they have an adopted son, Victor Anthony "Vic," who was the son of Silverio's grand-nephew, now deceased.

In addition, Silverio had children with his first legal wife, Beatriz Sison, including Ligaya, Ricardo Jr "Ricky", and Nelia. He also had four other children from other relationships: Rowena, Roxanne, and Ricardo "Ricky III" with one partner, and Richard with another.

Silverio died on December 11, 2016, at the age 87, due to cardiac arrest.

House of Representatives of the Philippines
Preceded by Jose Cabochan	Representative, 3rd District of Bulacan; 1992–2001	Succeeded by Lorna Silverio
Political offices
Preceded by Jessie Viceo	Mayor of San Rafael, Bulacan; 2001–2010	Succeeded by Lorna Silverio
