= Lorna Silverio =

Filipina politician (born 1948)

Lorna C. Silverio
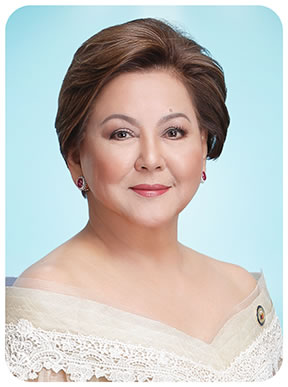
- Official portrait, 2022

Member of the Philippine House of Representatives from Bulacan's 3rd district
- In office June 30, 2016 – June 30, 2025
- Preceded by: Jonjon Mendoza
- Succeeded by: Cholo Violago
- In office June 30, 2001 – June 30, 2010
- Preceded by: Ricardo Silverio
- Succeeded by: Jonjon Mendoza
- Constituency: Bulacan's 3rd district

Mayor of San Rafael, Bulacan
- In office June 30, 2010 – June 30, 2013
- Preceded by: Ricardo Silverio
- Succeeded by: Cipriano Violago Jr.

Personal details
- Born: Lorna F. Cillian; February 1, 1948 (age 78) Bais, Negros Oriental, Philippines
- Party: NUP (2011–present)
- Other political affiliations: Lakas (2001–2011)
- Spouse: Ricardo Silverio (m. 1998; died 2016)
- Education: University of the East
- Occupation: Businesswoman, politician

Lorna Cillian-Silverio (born Lorna Fortich Cillian on February 1, 1948) is a Filipina politician who served in the House of Representatives of the Philippines as the representative of Bulacan's 3rd congressional district from 2016 to 2025, and previously from 2001 to 2010. She was also the mayor of San Rafael, Bulacan from 2010 to 2013. She is the widow of businessman and politician Ricardo Silverio.

== Early life and education ==
Silverio was born on February 1, 1948, in Bais, Negros Oriental to Virgilio Cillan Sr. and Remedios Fortich. She attended Luisiana Elementary School in Luisiana, Laguna and Manuel A. Roxas High School in Paco, Manila. In 1968, she graduated from the University of the East with a bachelor of science degree in business administration with a major in marketing.

== Career ==
Her early professional life involved employment at the now-defunct Air Manila, owned by her future husband Ricardo Silverio, where she worked as a Reservation and Ticketing Agent beginning in 1968. Following this, she held various roles, including a stint as a secretary at the Makati Stock Exchange and later as the executive secretary to Ricardo Silverio when he was president of Delta Motors Corporation from 1969 until its closure in 1984.

Starting in the 1980s, she held key positions as chairman and president of Prime Sites Advertising and Silvercraft International Corp., an export company. Additionally, she served as the vice president of Pilipinas Development Corp., a real estate company, and held directorial roles in Hong Kong-based Huxford Company Limited and Dias Automation. Moreover, she served as a director of Silcor (USA), Inc.

=== Political career ===
Silverio's entry into politics occurred when her husband, Ricardo, served as a member of the House of Representatives from 1992 to 2001, during which time she served as his legislative chief of staff. Unable to seek re-election after three terms, Lorna was drafted to succeed him as representative, while he pursued the position of mayor in San Rafael, Bulacan. Lorna ultimately won in the 2001 elections and was re-elected in 2004 and 2007.

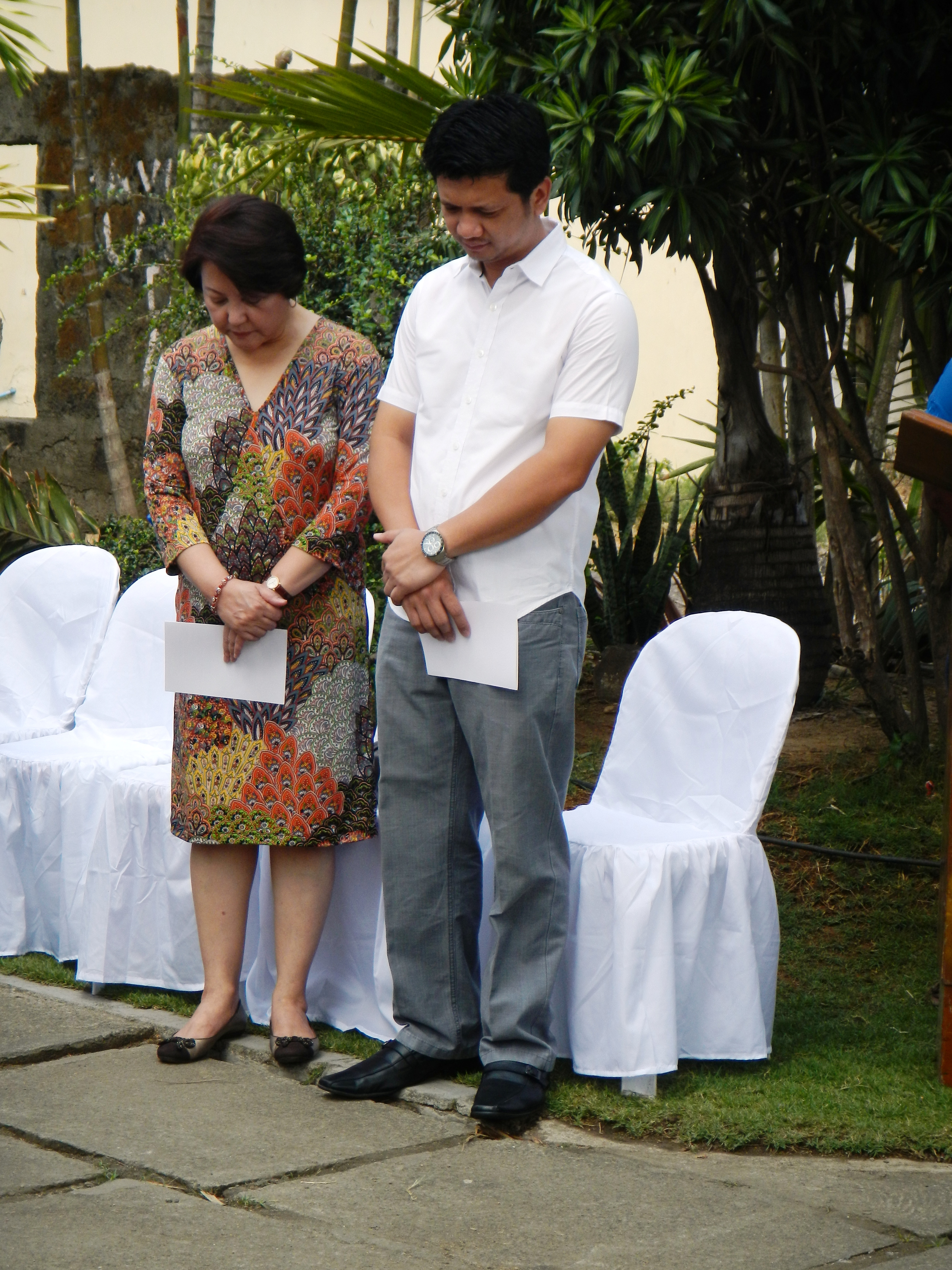
Silverio with San Ildefonso Mayor Gerald Galvez during a 2014 Day of Valor commemoration ceremony

In 2010, having completed three full terms and facing term limits, the couple exchanged roles, with Ricardo running for Congress and Lorna for mayor. While Lorna secured victory in the mayoral election receiving 54.25% of the votes, Ricardo faced defeat against then-Governor Jonjon Mendoza. Lorna then ran for re-election in 2013 but lost receiving only 35.29% of the votes against her opponent, vice mayor Goto Viologo who received 64.71%.

In 2016, Silverio ran for Congress once more, facing off against Mendoza. She emerged victorious in the election, securing 52% of the votes compared to Mendoza's 48%. In the subsequent 2019 elections, Silverio and Mendoza contested once again, yielding a similar outcome: Silverio won with 51.57% of the vote against Mendoza's 39.30%. In the 2022 elections, Silverio ran for her third and final term, securing a decisive victory with 69.07% of the votes.

In the current 19th Congress of the Philippines, Silverio is a member of the following committees:

- Philippine House Committee on Accounts (Vice Chairperson)
- Philippine House Committee on Inter-Parliamentary Relations and Diplomacy (Vice Chairperson)
- Philippine House Committee on Foreign Affairs (Member for the Majority)
- Philippine House Committee on Games and Amusements (Member for the Majority)
- Philippine House Committee on Higher and Technical Education (Member for the Majority)
- Philippine House Special Committee on Nuclear Energy (Member for the Majority)
- Philippine House Committee on Women and Gender Equality (Member for the Majority)

== Personal life ==
Silverio was first married to Carlo Enrico Javier, a pilot at Air Manila. Their marriage was annulled, with the decision attaining finality on December 22, 2006. She later married Ricardo Silverio on March 27, 1998. She has four children: Kathrina, Carlo, and Raphael with Javier, and Victor Anthony—who was adopted with Silverio and is the biological son of Silverio's grand-nephew. Additionally, she has several stepchildren from Ricardo Silverio’s previous relationships.

House of Representatives of the Philippines
Preceded by Ricardo Silverio	Representative, 3rd District of Bulacan; 2001-2010	Succeeded by Joselito Mendoza
Preceded by Joselito Mendoza	Representative, 3rd District of Bulacan; 2016-2025	Succeeded by Cholo Violago
Political offices
Preceded by Ricardo Silverio	Mayor of San Rafael, Bulacan; 2010-2013	Succeeded by Cipriano Violago Jr.
