= Bulacan's 3rd congressional district =

House of Representatives of the Philippines legislative district

- Constituency for the House of Representatives of the Philippines
- Boundary of Bulacan's 3rd congressional district in Bulacan
- Location of Bulacan within the Philippines
- Province: Bulacan
- Region: Central Luzon
- Population: 419,539 (2020)
- Electorate: 265,734 (2022)
- Major settlements: 4 LGUs: Municipalities; Doña Remedios Trinidad; San Ildefonso; San Miguel; San Rafael
- Area: 1,829.27 km^{2} (706.29 sq mi)

Current constituency
- Created: 1987
- Representative: Mark Cholo I. Violago
- Political party: PFP
- Congressional bloc: Majority

Bulacan's 3rd congressional district is one of the seven congressional districts in the province of Bulacan, Philippines. It has been represented in the House of Representatives since 1987. The district consists of municipalities in northern and eastern Bulacan, namely Doña Remedios Trinidad, San Ildefonso, San Miguel, and San Rafael. It is currently represented in the 20th Congress by Cholo Violago of the Partido Federal ng Pilipinas (PFP).

Angat and Norzagaray were once part of the district until they were excised to form the sixth district effective 2022.

== Representation history ==
#	Image	Member	Term of office		Congress	Party	Electoral history	Constituent LGUs
#	Image	Member	Start	End	Congress	Party	Electoral history	Constituent LGUs
=== Bulacan's 3rd district for the House of Representatives of the Philippines ===
District created February 2, 1987.
1		Jose L. Cabochan	June 30, 1987	June 30, 1992	8th	PDP–Laban	Elected in 1987.	1987–2022; Angat, Doña Remedios Trinidad, Norzagaray, San Ildefonso, San Miguel, San Rafael
1		Jose L. Cabochan	June 30, 1987	June 30, 1992	8th	Lakas	Elected in 1987.	1987–2022; Angat, Doña Remedios Trinidad, Norzagaray, San Ildefonso, San Miguel, San Rafael
2		Ricardo C. Silverio	June 30, 1992	June 30, 2001	9th	LDP	Elected in 1992.	1987–2022; Angat, Doña Remedios Trinidad, Norzagaray, San Ildefonso, San Miguel, San Rafael
2		Ricardo C. Silverio	June 30, 1992	June 30, 2001	10th	Lakas	Re-elected in 1995.	1987–2022; Angat, Doña Remedios Trinidad, Norzagaray, San Ildefonso, San Miguel, San Rafael
2		Ricardo C. Silverio	June 30, 1992	June 30, 2001	11th	Lakas	Re-elected in 1998.	1987–2022; Angat, Doña Remedios Trinidad, Norzagaray, San Ildefonso, San Miguel, San Rafael
3		Lorna C. Silverio	June 30, 2001	June 30, 2010	12th	Lakas	Elected in 2001.	1987–2022; Angat, Doña Remedios Trinidad, Norzagaray, San Ildefonso, San Miguel, San Rafael
3		Lorna C. Silverio	June 30, 2001	June 30, 2010	13th	Lakas	Re-elected in 2004.	1987–2022; Angat, Doña Remedios Trinidad, Norzagaray, San Ildefonso, San Miguel, San Rafael
3		Lorna C. Silverio	June 30, 2001	June 30, 2010	14th	Lakas	Re-elected in 2007.	1987–2022; Angat, Doña Remedios Trinidad, Norzagaray, San Ildefonso, San Miguel, San Rafael
4		Joselito Andrew R. Mendoza	June 30, 2010	June 30, 2016	15th	Liberal	Elected in 2010.	1987–2022; Angat, Doña Remedios Trinidad, Norzagaray, San Ildefonso, San Miguel, San Rafael
4		Joselito Andrew R. Mendoza	June 30, 2010	June 30, 2016	16th	Liberal	Re-elected in 2013.	1987–2022; Angat, Doña Remedios Trinidad, Norzagaray, San Ildefonso, San Miguel, San Rafael
(3)		Lorna C. Silverio	June 30, 2016	June 30, 2025	17th	NUP	Elected in 2016.	1987–2022; Angat, Doña Remedios Trinidad, Norzagaray, San Ildefonso, San Miguel, San Rafael
(3)		Lorna C. Silverio	June 30, 2016	June 30, 2025	18th	NUP	Re-elected in 2019.	1987–2022; Angat, Doña Remedios Trinidad, Norzagaray, San Ildefonso, San Miguel, San Rafael
(3)		Lorna C. Silverio	June 30, 2016	June 30, 2025	19th	NUP	Re-elected in 2022.	2022–present Doña Remedios Trinidad, San Ildefonso, San Miguel, San Rafael
5		Mark Cholo I. Violago	June 30, 2025	Incumbent	20th	Lakas	Elected in 2025.	2022–present Doña Remedios Trinidad, San Ildefonso, San Miguel, San Rafael
5		Mark Cholo I. Violago	June 30, 2025	Incumbent	20th	PFP	Elected in 2025.	2022–present Doña Remedios Trinidad, San Ildefonso, San Miguel, San Rafael

== Election results ==
=== 2025 ===
2025 Philippine House of Representatives election in Bulacan's 3rd District
Party	Candidate	Votes	%
Lakas	Cholo Violago	146,672	60.51
NUP	Kuya Vic Silverio	94,631	39.04
Independent	JG Agojo	1,077	0.44
Total votes		242,380	100
Lakas gain from NUP			

=== 2022 ===
2022 Philippine House of Representatives election in Bulacan's 3rd District
Party	Candidate	Votes	%
NUP	Lorna Silverio	143,698	69.07
Aksyon	Jessie Viceo	61,258	29.57
Independent	Allan Villena	2,811	1.35
Total votes		208,037	100
NUP hold			

=== 2019 ===
2019 Philippine House of Representatives election in Bulacan's 3rd District
Party	Candidate	Votes	%
NUP	Lorna Silverio	135,830	51.57
PDP–Laban	Jonjon Mendoza	103,505	39.30
PMP	Ricardo Silverio, Jr.	22,630	8.59
Independent	Allan Villena	1,374	0.52
Total votes		263,339	100
NUP hold			

=== 2016 ===
2016 Philippine House of Representatives election in Bulacan 3rd District
Party	Candidate	Votes	%
NUP	Lorna Silverio	119,988	52.04
Liberal	Jonjon Mendoza	110,573	47.96
Total votes		230,561	100%
NUP gain from Liberal			

=== 2013 ===
2013 Philippine House of Representatives election at Bulacan's 3rd district
Party	Candidate	Votes	%
Liberal	Jonjon Mendoza	102,624	56.17
UNA	Jose Cabochan	46,955	25.70
Independent	Enrique Viudez	29,710	16.26
PMP	Ricardo Silverio, Jr.	3,422	1.87
Total votes		182,711	100%
Liberal hold			

=== 2010 ===
Philippine House of Representatives election at Bulacan's 3rd district
Party	Candidate	Votes	%
Liberal	Joselito Mendoza	121,576	55.07
Lakas–Kampi	Ricardo Silverio, Sr.	92,951	42.10
PMP	Ricardo Silverio, Jr.	6,241	2.83
Total votes		232,038	100.00
Liberal gain from Lakas–Kampi			

== See also ==
- Legislative districts of Bulacan
