= Delta Motors Corporation =

Automobile company from the Philippines

- Type: Private
- Industry: Manufacturing, automotive industry
- Founded: 1962
- Defunct: 1984 (dissolved in 1988)
- Fate: Dissolved following political disfavor
- Successor: Toyota Motor Philippines Corporation (TMP)
- Headquarters: Manila, Philippines
- Area served: Philippines
- Key people: Ricardo C. Silverio Sr.
- Products: Automobiles, engines

Delta Motors Corporation was an automobile company established by Ricardo C. Silverio Sr. in the Philippines. It operated under a technical tie-up with Toyota Motor Corporation of Japan, but also produced its own range of small off-roaders called the "Delta Mini Cruiser". Delta was founded in 1962 and continued to be Toyota's local assembler and distributor until 1984.

== History ==
In addition to assembling Toyotas for the local market, Delta also used their own name to market the "Mini Cruiser", a little off-roader appearing a lot like a scaled-down 40-series Toyota Land Cruiser and using Toyota engines and other technology. It was developed in the mid-seventies especially for the Philippine Army as the M-1777, but was also sold commercially.

The Mini Cruiser (sometimes called the Explorer) was even exported, to Colombia, Papua New Guinea, the Middle East and to Italy. In Italy, it was sold by Gandin Auto from 1980. About 500 units were sold in Italy until supplies dried up in 1986, following Delta's untimely bankruptcy in 1984. The now rare Delta Mini Cruiser also became available as a two-seater pickup truck, estate, van, and as a five-seater jeep during the 1980s.

An interesting development was one of the first "Asian Utility Vehicles" (AUV), the Toyota Tamaraw. This little utilitarian car was based on the Indonesian Kijang, and the "Tamaraw" name continues to be used in the Philippine market today, also becoming a colloquial term for any AUV. Toyota themselves refer to this car as a BUV, for "Basic Utility Vehicle". The BUV was intended to be a general-purpose vehicle for developing countries, designed to meet local needs and facilitate technology transfers in order to respond to the domestic production policies of various Asian countries. Philippine assembly began in December 1976.

Delta also built Toyota's 12R engine from 1973, the tools and die-sets for which were acquired through the Philippine National Bank (PNB) as part of Japan's war reparations to the Philippines.

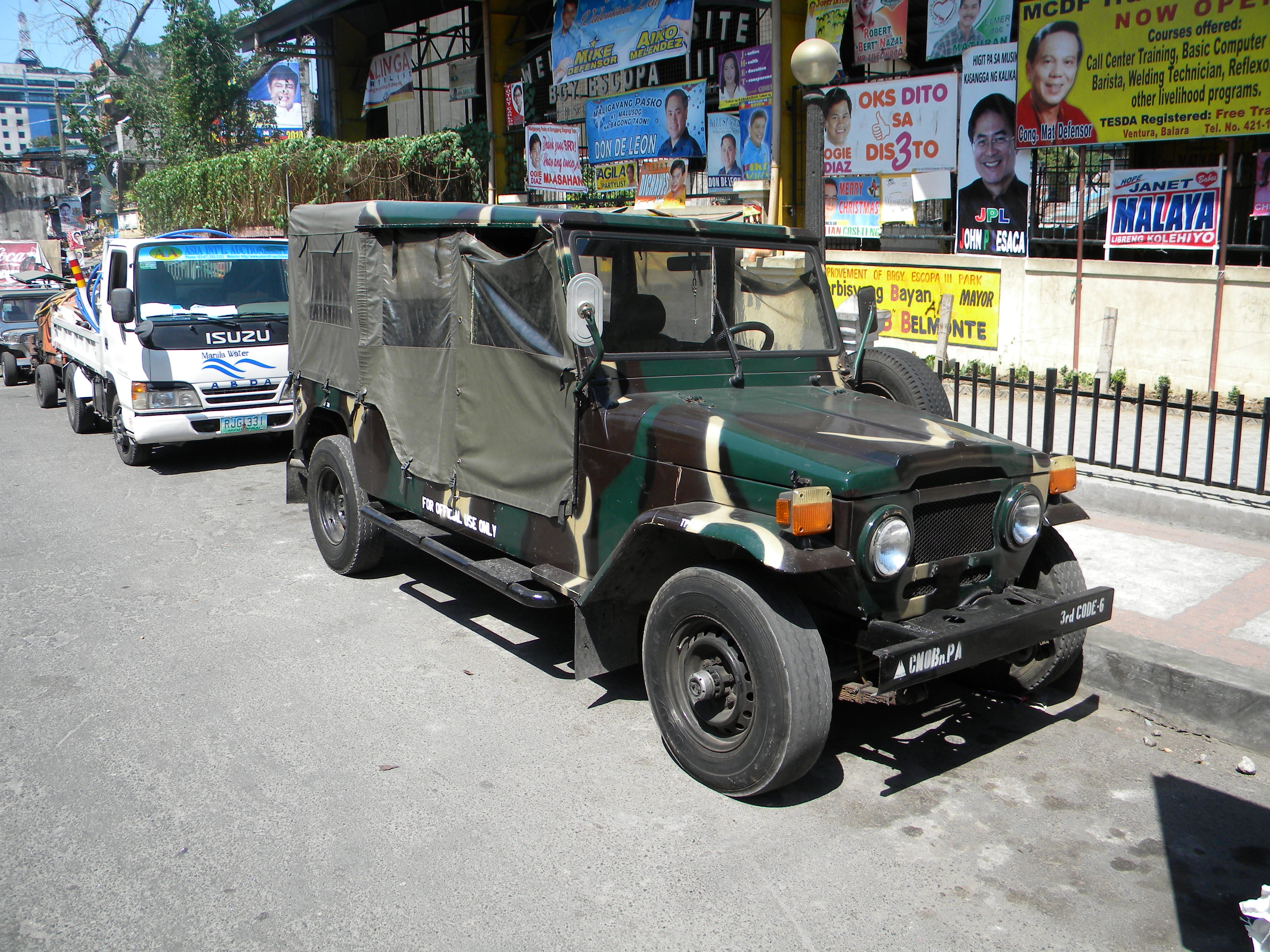
Long wheelbase Delta Mini Cruiser belonging to the Philippine Army

=== The end ===
Silverio fell out of favor with then Philippine president Ferdinand Marcos during the Philippine economic downturn in the early eighties. Operations came to a halt in December 1983 and by March 1984, Toyota cancelled their tie-up. The company was dissolved in 1988, with 35% of its assets going to Toyota and Mitsui and the remaining 65% going to the Philippine National Bank. Toyota formally entered the Philippine market in August 1988 through its subsidiary Toyota Motor Philippines Corporation (TMPC).

=== Potential revival ===
In meetings with Toyota representatives from Japan in February 2023, President Marcos Jr. suggested that the Mini Cruiser could be revived.

The new Toyota Tamaraw was revived by Toyota officially on December 6, 2024.

== Toyota models ==
- Toyota Corolla
- Toyota Corona
- Toyota Cressida
- Toyota Crown
- Toyota Celica
- Toyota Hiace
- Toyota Land Cruiser
- Toyota Starlet
- Toyota Tamaraw
- Toyota Townace
- Toyota Hilux
- Toyota DA-series truck (in Japanese)
- Delta Mini Cruiser

== Basketball ==
The company was active in professional basketball in the Philippines from 1973 to 1983 with its Toyota basketball team, led by notable players like Alberto Reynoso, Robert Jaworski, Francis Arnaiz and Ramon Fernandez.
