= Jonjon Mendoza =

Filipino politician and businessman (born 1962)

The Honorable Jonjon Mendoza
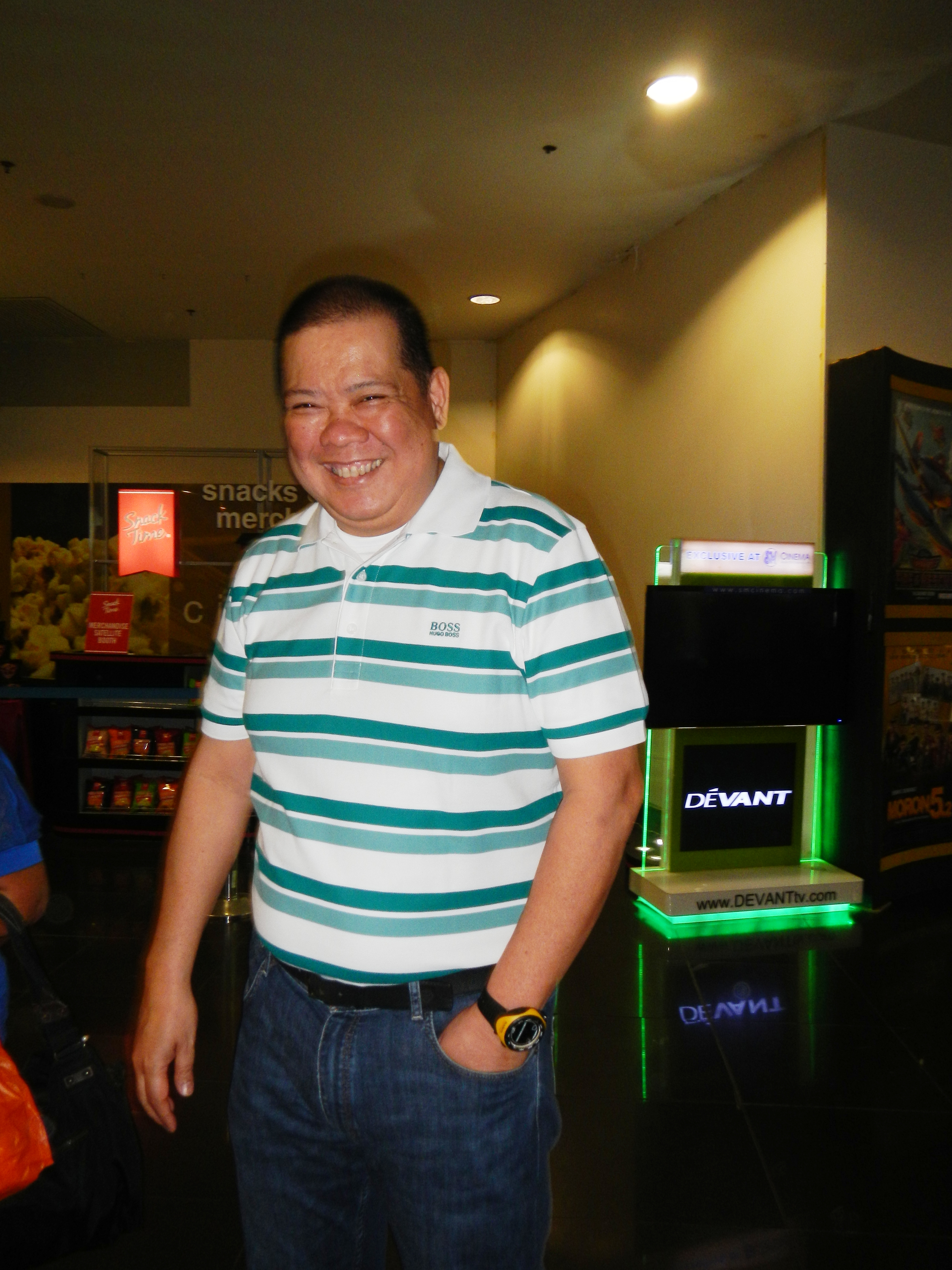
- Mendoza in 2014

Member of the Philippine House of Representatives from Bulacan's 3rd district
- In office June 30, 2010 – June 30, 2016
- Preceded by: Lorna Silverio
- Succeeded by: Lorna Silverio

32nd Governor of Bulacan
- In office June 30, 2007 – June 30, 2010
- Vice Governor: Wilhelmino Sy-Alvarado
- Preceded by: Josefina dela Cruz
- Succeeded by: Wilhelmino Sy-Alvarado

Provincial President of Liga ng mga Barangay in Bulacan Ex officio Member of the Bulacan Provincial Board
- In office 2002 – June 30, 2007

Personal details
- Born: Joselito Andrew Roxas Mendoza; November 10, 1962 (age 63) Bocaue, Bulacan, Philippines
- Party: PDP–Laban (2018–present)
- Other political affiliations: Liberal (2009–2018); Lakas (2008-2009); KAMPI (2002-2008)
- Spouse: Violeta Mendoza
- Occupation: Politician
- Website: https://jonjonmendoza.com

Joselito Andrew "Jonjon" Roxas Mendoza (born November 10, 1962) is a Filipino politician and businessman who last served as the representative of Bulacan's 3rd district from 2010 to 2016. He previously served as Governor of Bulacan from 2007 to 2010. He ran for vice governor of Bulacan in 2022 but lost to Alex Castro.

== Early life and education ==
Mendoza was born on November 10, 1962, in Bocaue, Bulacan. He completed his elementary and secondary education at St. Paul College of Bocaue. He earned his Bachelor of Science degree in Animal Husbandry at Gregorio Araneta University (now De La Salle Araneta University). He also attended the Strategic Business Economic Program at the University of Asia and the Pacific.

== Business career ==
Mendoza is the Vice President for Sales and Marketing of J.M. Mendoza Enterprises beginning in 1999. Previously, he was the president of Freeway Motor Sales of Baliuag Corporation, a Mitsubishi Motors dealership in Baliuag, from 1992 to 1999.

== Political career ==
Mendoza entered politics when he became the barangay captain of Barangay Duhat in Bocaue, Bulacan. He was also named as the Provincial President of Liga ng mga Barangay in Bulacan, thus earning him a seat at the Bulacan Provincial Board as an ex officio member representing such sector from 2002 to 2007.

=== Governor of Bulacan (2007–2010) ===
He ran for governor of Bulacan in 2007 under the Lakas-CMD party. He won defeating Roberto Pagdanganan, but his running mate Pacifico Aniag lost to then-Congressman Wilhelmino Sy-Alvarado. He succeeded his sister Josefina Mendoza-dela Cruz. Pagdanganan filed a protest and Pagdanganan was proclaimed by COMELEC as the true winner of the 2007 elections.

=== Representative (2010–2016) ===
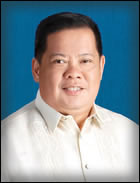
Mendoza official portrait during the 16th Congress.

Eligible for running for second term as governor, Mendoza instead ran for congressman of Bulacan's 3rd District under Liberal Party. He won defeating Carding Silverio, husband of Lorna Silverio, and his son Ricky Silverio. He was reelected in 2013. As representative, he was also a member of the House of Representatives Electoral Tribunal and the Vice Chairman of the Committee on Rural Development.

He ran for third term in 2016 but lost to Lorna Silverio, wife of the late Carding Silverio. He ran again in 2019 but lost to Silverio once again.

=== Vice gubernatorial bid (2022) ===
He ran for vice governor under PDP-Laban party as the running mate of Vice Governor Wilhelmino Sy-Alvarado, his erstwhile rival, in the 2022 elections. He lost to board member Alex Castro, placing second.

== Family ==
He is the younger brother of Josefina Mendoza-dela Cruz, governor of Bulacan from 1998 to 2007.

== Marriage ==
He and his wife, Violeta, have a son, Josef Andrew T. Mendoza, known as Anjo Mendoza, who is a former councilor of Bocaue and ex-officio member of the Bulacan Provincial Board, representing the Philippine Councilors League in 2016.
