= Legislative districts of Bulacan =

Legislative district of the Philippines

The legislative districts of Bulacan are the representations of the province of Bulacan in the various national legislatures of the Philippines. The province is currently represented in the lower house of the Congress of the Philippines through its first, second, third, fourth, fifth and sixth congressional districts.

Congressional districts of Bulacan.

Valenzuela (formerly Polo), now a highly urbanized city, was last represented as part of the province in 1972.

The component city of San Jose del Monte, while remaining an integral part of the province, was granted separate congressional representation in 2003.

== History ==
Bulacan as initially composed of one representative district, wherein it elected four representatives, at large, to the Malolos Congress in 1898; this lasted until 1899. It was later divided into two representative districts in 1907 for the Philippine Assembly. When seats for the upper house of the Philippine Legislature were elected from territory-based districts between 1916 and 1935, the province formed part of the third senatorial district which elected two out of the 24-member senate.

In the disruption caused by the Second World War, two delegates represented the province in the National Assembly of the Japanese-sponsored Second Philippine Republic: one was the provincial governor (an ex officio member), while the other was elected through a provincial assembly of KALIBAPI members during the Japanese occupation of the Philippines. Upon the restoration of the Philippine Commonwealth in 1945, the province retained its two pre-war representative districts.

Valenzuela, then a municipality, was separated from Bulacan to form the Metropolitan Manila Area on November 7, 1975, by virtue of Presidential Decree No. 824. Afterwards, the reduced province of Bulacan was represented in the Interim Batasang Pambansa as part of Region III from 1978 to 1984, and returned four representatives, elected at large, to the Regular Batasang Pambansa in 1984.

The province was reapportioned into four congressional districts under the new Constitution which was proclaimed on February 11, 1987, and elected members to the restored House of Representatives starting that same year.

The passage of Republic Act No. 9230. on December 18, 2003, separated from the fourth district the city of San Jose del Monte, which first elected its separate representative beginning in the 2004 elections. However, for the purposes of electing Sangguniang Panlalawigan members, the city remains part of the province's 4th Sangguniang Panlalawigan District.

Republic Act No. 9591, approved on May 1, 2009, sought to separate the city of Malolos from the first district to form its own congressional district starting in the 2010 elections. Like in the case of San Jose del Monte, the residents of Malolos would have remained as part of the province's 1st Sangguniang Panlalawigan district. However, on January 25, 2010, the Supreme Court declared the creation of the Legislative District of Malolos as unconstitutional, citing that the city's population at the time did not meet the minimum 250,000 count required by the constitution. Malolos today remains part of the first district.

Republic Act No. 11546, approved on May 26, 2021, reapportioned Bulacan into six congressional districts.

- 1st District: Malolos, Bulakan, Calumpit, Hagonoy, Paombong, Pulilan
- 2nd District: Baliwag, Bustos, Plaridel
- 3rd District: Doña Remedios Trinidad, San Ildefonso, San Miguel, San Rafael
- 4th District: Meycauayan, Marilao, Obando
- 5th District: Balagtas, Bocaue, Guiguinto, Pandi
- 6th District: Angat, Norzagaray, Santa Maria

== Current districts ==
The province was last redistricted in 2021, wherein the province gained two seats in the house. The province's current congressional delegation composes of two members of the National Unity Party and four members of the Partido Federal ng Pilipinas.

Congressional districts and representatives of Bulacan
District	Current Representative	Party	Constituent LGUs	Population (2020)	Area	Map
1st	Danilo A. Domingo (since 2022); Malolos	NUP	List: Bulakan; Calumpit; Hagonoy; Malolos; Paombong; Pulilan	758,872	385.73 km^{2}	
2nd	Augustina Dominique C. Pancho (since 2022); Baliwag	NUP	List: Baliwag; Bustos; Plaridel	360,101	147.48 km^{2}	
3rd	Mark Cholo I. Violago (since 2025); San Rafael	PFP	List: Doña Remedios Trinidad; San Ildefonso; San Miguel; San Rafael	419,539	1,445.50 km^{2}	
4th	Linabelle Ruth R. Villarica (since 2022); Meycauayan	PFP	List: Meycauayan; Marilao; Obando	540,104	117.94 km^{2}	
5th	Agatha Paula A. Cruz (since 2025); Guiguinto	PFP	List: Balagtas; Bocaue; Guiguinto; Pandi	486,960	119.23 km^{2}	
6th	Salvador A. Pleyto (since 2022); Santa Maria	PFP	List: Angat; Norzagaray; Santa Maria	491,501	453.44 km^{2}	

== Historical districts ==
=== 1898–1899 ===
- includes Polo

Period	Representatives
Malolos Congress; 1898–1899	Ambrosio Rianzares Bautista
Malolos Congress; 1898–1899	Mariano Crisostomo
Malolos Congress; 1898–1899	Pedro Serrano
Malolos Congress; 1898–1899	Trinidad Icasiano

=== 1943–1944 ===
- includes Polo

Period	Representatives
National Assembly; 1943–1944	Jacinto Molina
National Assembly; 1943–1944	Emilio Rustia (ex officio)

=== 1984–1986 ===
Period	Representatives
Regular Batasang Pambansa; 1984–1986	Jesus J. Hipolito
Regular Batasang Pambansa; 1984–1986	Rogaciano M. Mercado
Regular Batasang Pambansa; 1984–1986	Teodulo Natividad
Regular Batasang Pambansa; 1984–1986	Blas F. Ople

== See also ==
- Legislative district of San Jose del Monte
- Legislative districts of Valenzuela
