= Cholo Violago =

Filipino politician (born 1984)

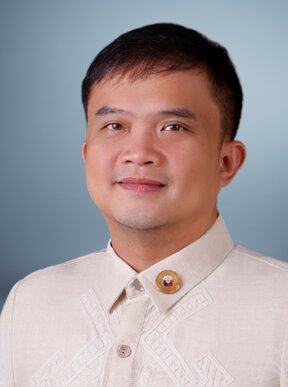
- Official portrait, 2026

Member of the House of Representatives from Bulacan's 3rd District
- Incumbent
- Assumed office June 30, 2025
- Preceded by: Lorna Silverio

Mayor of San Rafael, Bulacan
- In office June 30, 2022 – June 30, 2025
- Vice Mayor: Lyn Veneracion
- Preceded by: Cipriano Violago Jr.
- Succeeded by: Cipriano Violago Jr.

Member of the Bulacan Provincial Board
- In office 2010–2013
- Constituency: Ex officio (President, Liga ng mga Barangay – Bulacan)

Personal details
- Born: Mark Cholo Inoncillo Violago; August 28, 1984 (age 42) Baliuag, Bulacan, Philippines
- Party: PFP (2026–present)
- Other political affiliations: Lakas (2021–2026)
- Spouse: Cindy de Guzman Violago
- Children: 4
- Profession: Politician

Mark Cholo Inoncillo Violago (born August 28, 1984) is a Filipino politician from Bulacan. He is the current representative of Bulacan's 3rd congressional district in the House of Representatives of the Philippines. He previously served as mayor of San Rafael, Bulacan from 2022 to 2025 and as an ex officio member of the Sangguniang Panlalawigan of Bulacan from 2010 to 2013.

== Early life and education ==
Mark Cholo Inoncillo Violago was born on August 28, 1984, in Baliuag, Bulacan, Philippines. He is the son of Cipriano Violago Jr., a former mayor and vice mayor of San Rafael, Bulacan, and Mabel Inoncillo.

== Political career ==
=== Early career ===
Mark Cholo Violago began his political career as an ex officio member of the Bulacan Provincial Board from 2010 to 2013, representing the Association of Barangay Captains (Liga ng mga Barangay).

In 2012, while serving as a board member, Violago survived an ambush in Plaridel, Bulacan. According to police reports, unidentified gunmen opened fire on his vehicle—a Hyundai Starex van—along the Plaridel Bypass Road. He sustained a gunshot wound to the leg and was brought to a hospital in Metro Manila, where he was reported to be in stable condition.

=== Mayor ===
In 2022, Violago was elected mayor of San Rafael, Bulacan, succeeding his father, Cipriano Violago Jr., who was term-limited for having served three consecutive terms. As a mayoral candidate, he publicly expressed support for then–vice presidential candidate Sara Duterte during the “Sara para sa Barangay” campaign event in Baliwag. Duterte acknowledged Violago’s support during the gathering.

=== Representative ===
In the 2025 elections, Violago ran for the congressional seat in Bulacan's 3rd congressional district under the House dominant party Lakas–CMD. He defeated Vic Silverio, son of outgoing representative Lorna Silverio. Following the official tally of votes, the Provincial Board of Canvassers proclaimed Violago as the elected district representative.

== Controversies ==
In 2013, Violago, then a board member of Bulacan, was mentioned in relation to a warrant of arrest issued for his father, Cipriano Violago Jr., who was running for mayor of San Rafael, Bulacan. According to police, board member Violago was contacted to facilitate the service of the warrant. "Kausap ko ang anak ni Goto. Si board member Mark Cholo Violago para tanungin at i-serve yung warrant. Pero wala daw yung father niya dun," said Chief Inspector Neil Santiago, referring to Violago Jr.'s nickname “Goto.” At the time, Cipriano Violago Jr. was reportedly in a tight mayoral race against incumbent mayor Lorna Silverio.

In September 2024, Violago, then Mayor of San Rafael, was involved in a standoff with personnel from the Bureau of Customs (BOC) at Clark International Airport in Pampanga. According to the BOC–Port of Clark, Violago arrived from Bangkok, Thailand, on September 10 and was allegedly found carrying undeclared regulated agricultural products and ₱400,000 in cash in his luggage. Under customs regulations, transporting more than ₱50,000 in local currency into or out of the Philippines requires prior written authorization from the Bangko Sentral ng Pilipinas. The BOC further alleged that Violago initially declared himself as "unemployed" and exhibited inappropriate and abusive behavior during the inspection, including reportedly threatening a customs officer. In response, Violago denied any wrongdoing and called on the BOC to release closed-circuit television (CCTV) footage of his arrival and departure to support his claims. He asserted that after identifying himself, customs personnel ceased questioning him. The BOC had earlier published a statement on its official Facebook page condemning the conduct of the official involved and publicly identified Violago as the subject of the incident.

== Personal life ==
Violago is married to Cindy de Guzman Violago, with whom he has four children.

== Electoral history ==
Electoral history of Cholo Violago
Year	Office	Party	Votes received				Result
Year	Office	Party	Total	%	P.	Swing	Result
2022	Mayor of San Rafael, Bulacan	Lakas	42,771	100.00%	1st	—N/a	Unopposed
2025	Representative (Bulacan–3rd)	Lakas	146,672	60.51%	1st	—N/a	Won
