= San Ildefonso, Bulacan =

Municipality in Bulacan, Philippines

San Ildefonso Bulak
- Municipality
- Municipality of San Ildefonso
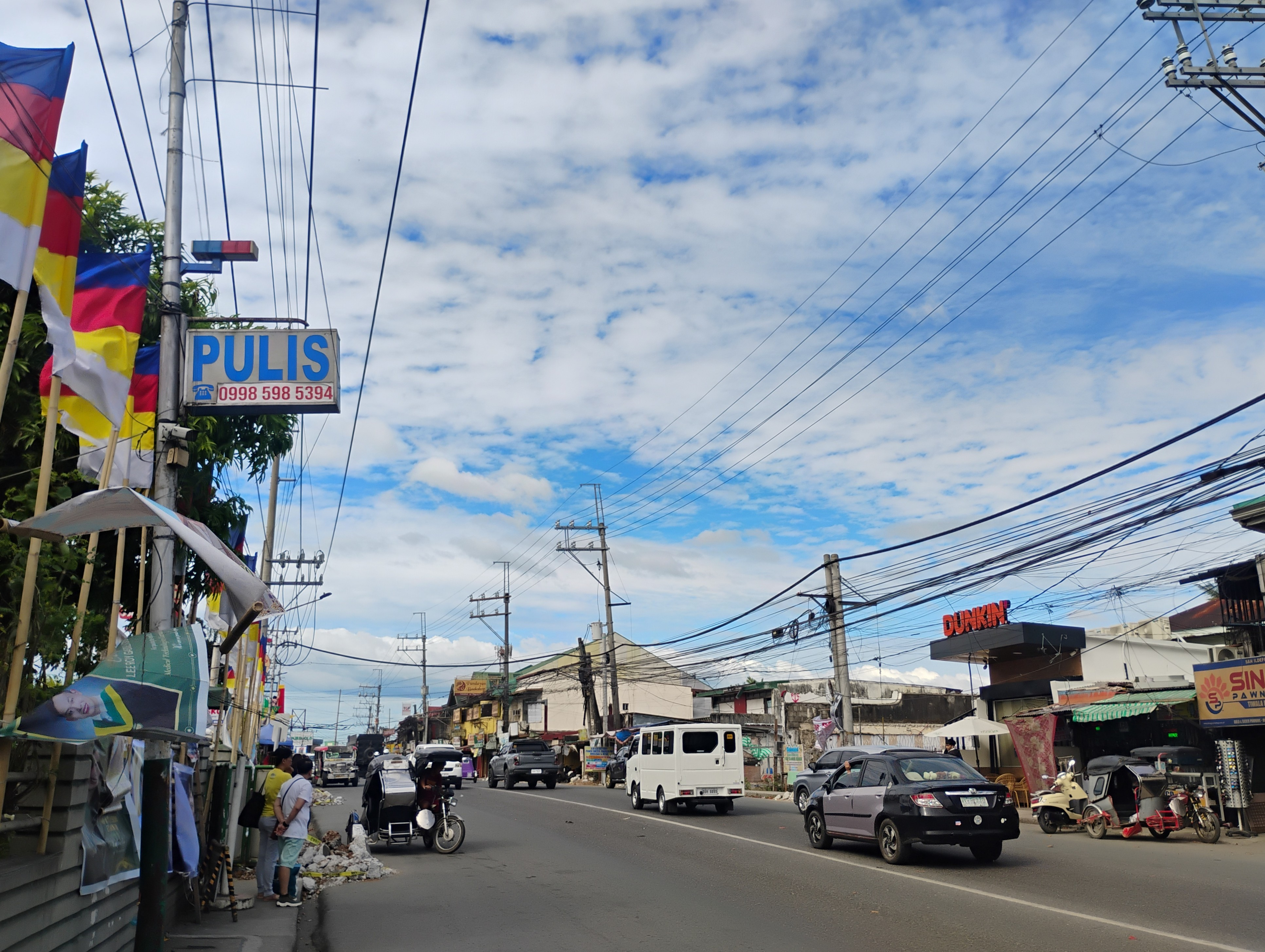
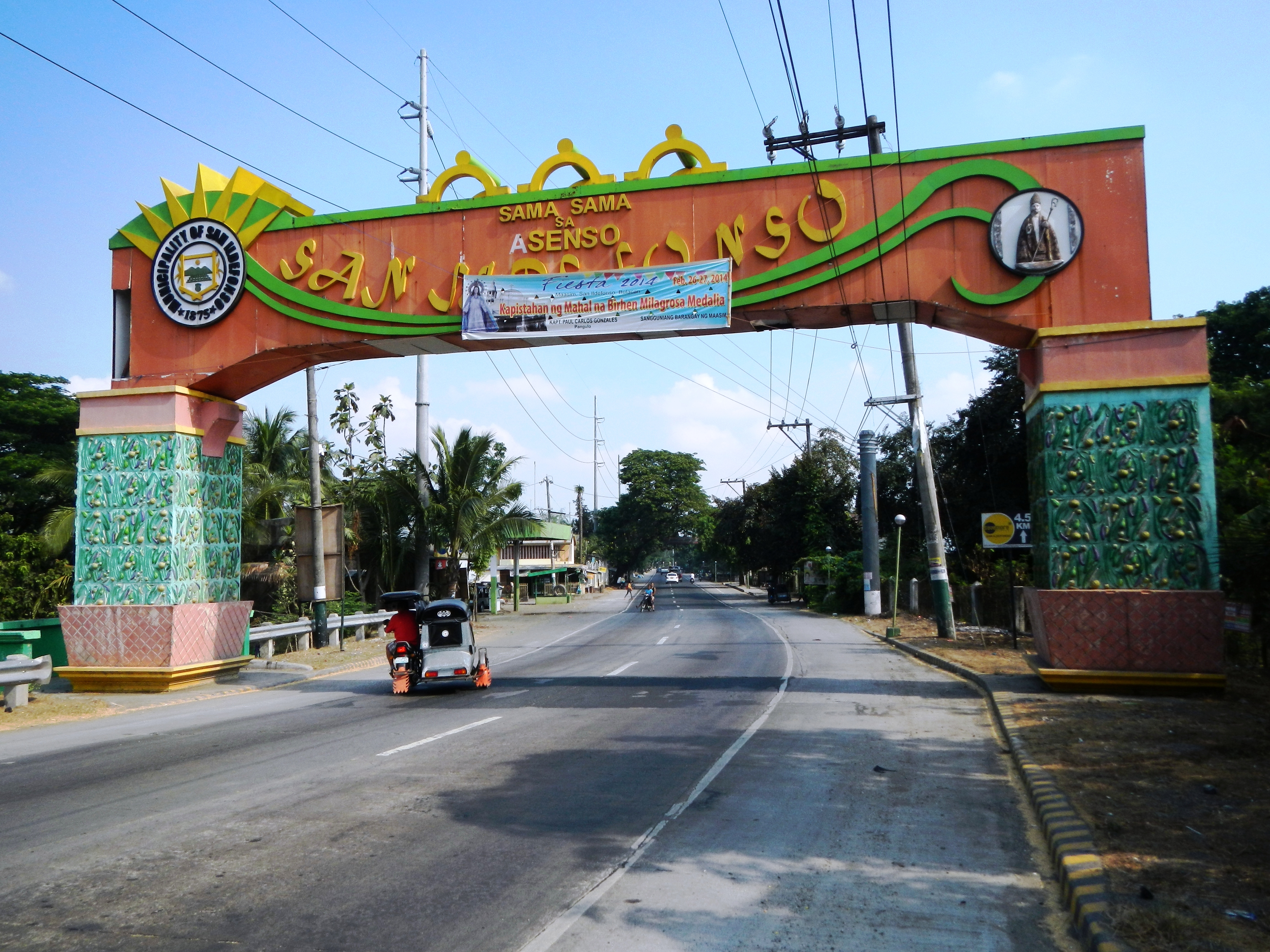
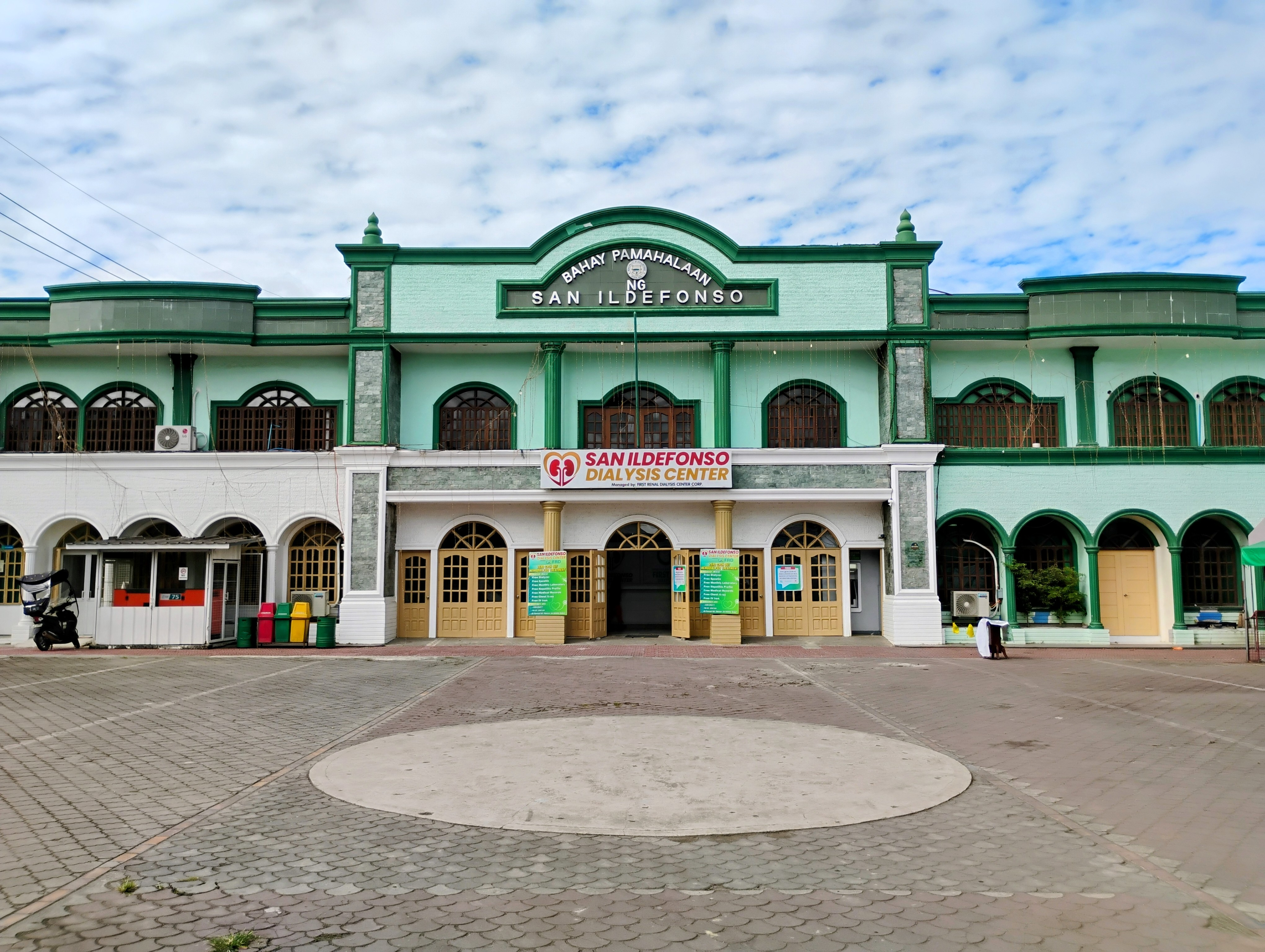
- San Ildefonso Town Proper Welcome Arch Old Municipal Hall

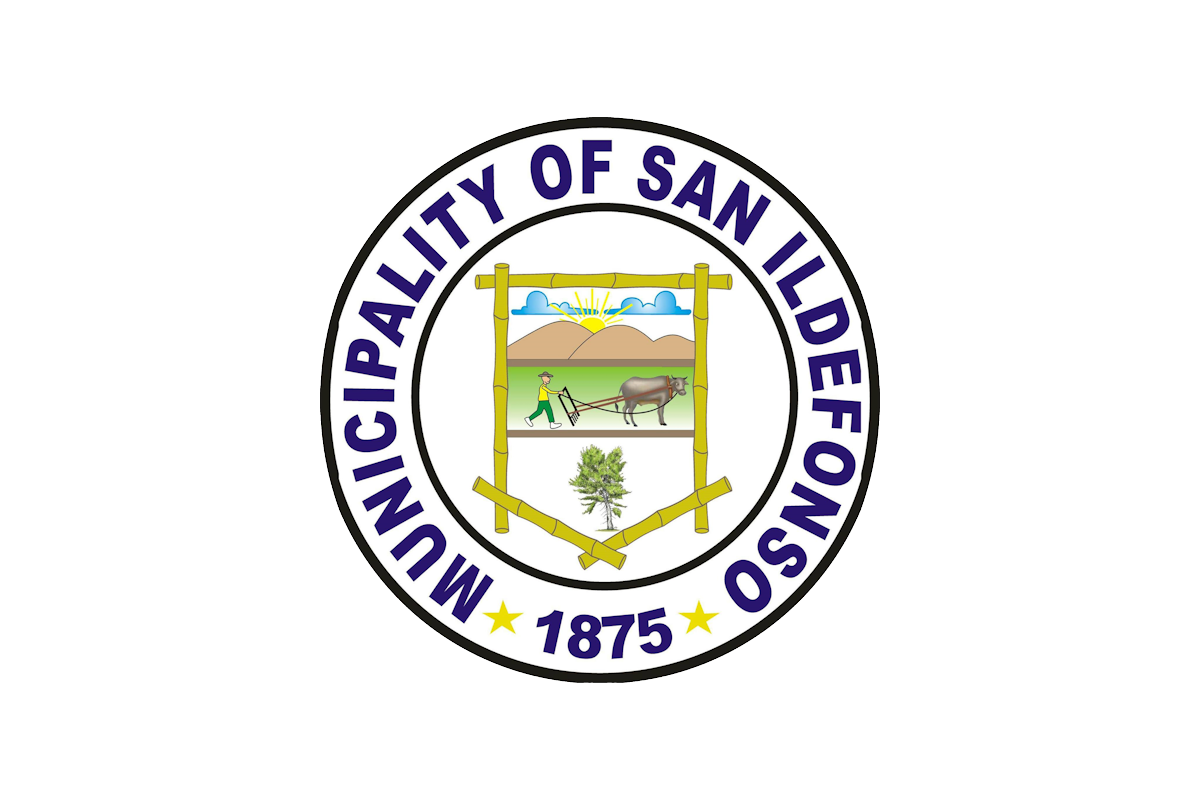
- Flag Seal

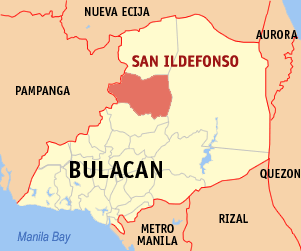
- Map of Bulacan with San Ildefonso highlighted
- Interactive map of San Ildefonso
- Location within the Philippines
- Coordinates: 15°04′44″N 120°56′31″E
- Country: Philippines
- Region: Central Luzon
- Province: Bulacan
- District: 3rd district
- Founded: 1877
- Named for: Saint Ildefonsus
- Barangays: 36 (see Barangays)

Government
  - Type: Sangguniang Bayan
  - Mayor: Fernando S. Galvez Jr. (NUP)
  - Vice Mayor: Chariz G. Cabande (NUP)
  - Representative: Mark Cholo I. Violago (Lakas)
  - Municipal Council: Members: Teemee I. Miguel; Genaro I. Galvez; Alexander J. Galvez; Andrea Lindsay B. Duran; John Paul S. Magbitang; Krizia Jewel V. Silverio; Mark Anthony P. Mananghaya; Michael D. Angeles
  - Electorate: 85,054 voters (2025)

Area
  - Total: 128.71 km^{2} (49.70 sq mi)
- Elevation: 19 m (62 ft)
- Highest elevation: 51 m (167 ft)
- Lowest elevation: 7 m (23 ft)

Population (2024 census)
  - Total: 123,140
  - Density: 956.72/km^{2} (2,477.9/sq mi)
  - Households: 29,301

Economy
  - Income class: 1st municipal income class
  - Poverty incidence: 12.06% (2023)
  - Revenue: ₱ 656.3 million (2024)
  - Assets: ₱ 1,499 million (2024)
  - Expenditure: ₱ 680.7 million (2024)
  - Liabilities: ₱ 789.6 million (2024)

Utilities
  - Electricity: Meralco
- Time zone: UTC+8 (PST)
- ZIP code: 3010
- PSGC: 0301419000
- IDD : area code: +63 (0)44
- Native languages: Tagalog; Kapampangan

San Ildefonso, officially the Municipality of San Ildefonso (Tagalog: Bayan ng San Ildefonso, Kapampangan: Balen ning San Ildefonso) is a municipality in the province of Bulacan, Philippines. According to the 2024 census, it has a population of 123,140 people.

== History ==
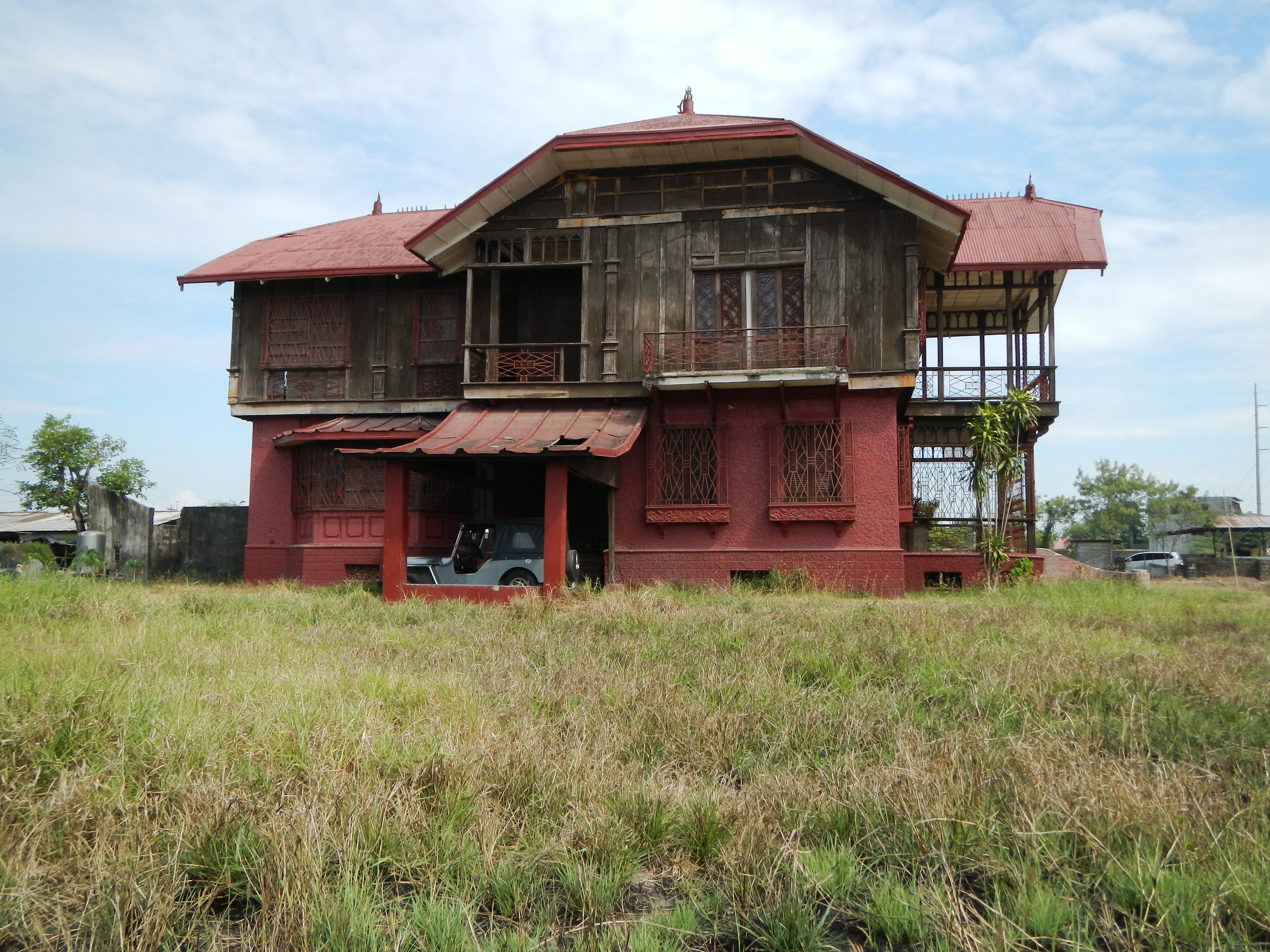
The Bahay na Pulá (“red house"), 2014.

The early inhabitants called the area Bulak because of the abundant kapok or bulak trees (Ceiba pentandra), which grew on the hill on which the present town was built.

Bulak was initially a barrio of San Rafael, with only about 3,000 inhabitants, who came from nearby towns and provinces who preferred to settle the land because of its good agricultural prospects.

In the Spanish era, the site was renamed Hacienda San Juan de Dios after 15,500 hectares of grazing and farming grounds were claimed by friars. The people made to pay tribute, with the money from the rentals used to finance operation of the San Juan de Dios Hospital in Pasay. The Spanish friars, though antagonistic toward the natives, admired the beauty of the natural scenery, and so renamed the place Hacienda Buenavista (which means beautiful scenery in Spanish).

As the population grew, a visita was constructed in the area under the parish of San Rafael. In 1809, Father Juan de la Rosa became the first Filipino priest of the town, having the position until 1811. He was responsible for changing the name Bulak to San Ildefonso in honor of Alfonso XII, the reigning King of Spain, and the patron saint, Ildefonsus of Toledo. By the time it was given this name, a tribunal was created finally making it a town in 1877. Between 1903 and 1906, San Ildefonso was merged with San Miguel due to its low income and inability to finance its expenditures in operating the local government.

As years went by, more and more people were induced to live in the town. The growth of population promoted an increase of income. The town became capable of meeting its expenses, so it ceased being a barrio of San Miguel and became once again an independent town.

During the Japanese occupation of the Philippines in 1942, the mansion Bahay na Pula of the Ilusorio family was confiscated by the Imperial Japanese Army. It became their barracks and a place where local so-called comfort women were forced into sexual slavery.

== Geography ==
With the continuous expansion of Metro Manila, the municipality is the northernmost part of Manila's built-up area.

San Ildefonso is 43 kilometers (27 mi) from Malolos and 66 kilometers (41 mi) from Manila.

=== Barangays ===
San Ildefonso is politically subdivided into 36 barangays, as shown in the matrix below. Each barangay consists of 7 puroks and some have sitios.

There are 6 urban and 30 rural barangays.

PSGC	Barangay	Population			±% p.a.	
		2024		2010		
031419001	Akle	3.5%	4,330	3,320	▴	1.86%
031419002	Alagao	2.8%	3,506	3,119	▴	0.81%
031419003	Anyatam	3.4%	4,169	3,887	▴	0.49%
031419006	Bagong Barrio	1.7%	2,150	2,087	▴	0.21%
031419007	Basuit	1.7%	2,068	1,961	▴	0.37%
031419008	Bubulong Munti	1.8%	2,245	2,078	▴	0.54%
031419009	Bubulong Malaki	1.7%	2,069	1,984	▴	0.29%
031419010	Buhol na Mangga	1.1%	1,402	1,302	▴	0.51%
031419011	Bulusukan	1.6%	1,948	1,814	▴	0.50%
031419012	Calasag	2.9%	3,578	3,237	▴	0.70%
031419013	Calawitan	2.8%	3,435	2,824	▴	1.37%
031419014	Casalat	1.5%	1,811	1,629	▴	0.74%
031419015	Gabihan	2.8%	3,393	3,298	▴	0.20%
031419016	Garlang	1.0%	1,183	1,082	▴	0.62%
031419017	Lapnit	2.5%	3,134	3,110	▴	0.05%
031419018	Maasim	3.1%	3,774	2,907	▴	1.83%
031419019	Makapilapil	1.8%	2,234	2,697	▾	−1.30%
031419020	Malipampang	4.8%	5,897	5,525	▴	0.45%
031419021	Matimbubong	2.1%	2,583	2,563	▴	0.05%
031419022	Nabaong Garlang	1.6%	1,914	1,790	▴	0.47%
031419023	Palapala	4.9%	6,087	5,348	▴	0.90%
031419024	Pasong Bangkal	0.7%	839	744	▴	0.84%
031419025	Pinaod	5.9%	7,283	6,545	▴	0.74%
031419026	Poblacion	3.3%	4,080	3,644	▴	0.79%
031419027	Pulong Tamo	1.6%	1,987	1,813	▴	0.64%
031419028	San Juan	4.2%	5,149	4,337	▴	1.20%
031419029	Santa Catalina Bata	1.2%	1,502	1,177	▴	1.70%
031419030	Santa Catalina Matanda	2.1%	2,620	2,497	▴	0.33%
031419031	Sapang Dayap	1.2%	1,483	1,447	▴	0.17%
031419032	Sapang Putik	3.2%	3,946	3,935	▴	0.02%
031419033	Sapang Putol	1.6%	1,988	2,073	▾	−0.29%
031419034	Sumandig	1.8%	2,257	1,966	▴	0.96%
031419035	Telapatio	0.8%	1,020	903	▴	0.85%
031419036	Upig	2.0%	2,524	2,225	▴	0.88%
031419037	Umpucan	2.0%	2,423	1,787	▴	2.13%
031419038	Mataas na Parang	2.0%	2,460	2,345	▴	0.33%
	Total		123,140	95,000	▴	1.81%

=== Climate ===
Climate data for San Ildefonso, Bulacan
Month	Jan	Feb	Mar	Apr	May	Jun	Jul	Aug	Sep	Oct	Nov	Dec	Year
Mean daily maximum °C (°F)	28 (82)	29 (84)	31 (88)	33 (91)	32 (90)	31 (88)	30 (86)	29 (84)	29 (84)	30 (86)	30 (86)	28 (82)	30 (86)
Mean daily minimum °C (°F)	20 (68)	20 (68)	21 (70)	22 (72)	24 (75)	24 (75)	24 (75)	24 (75)	24 (75)	23 (73)	22 (72)	21 (70)	22 (72)
Average precipitation mm (inches)	6 (0.2)	4 (0.2)	6 (0.2)	17 (0.7)	82 (3.2)	122 (4.8)	151 (5.9)	123 (4.8)	124 (4.9)	99 (3.9)	37 (1.5)	21 (0.8)	792 (31.1)
Average rainy days	3.3	2.5	11.7	6.6	17.7	22.2	25.2	23.7	23.2	17.9	9.2	5.2	168.4
Source: Meteoblue

== Demographics ==
Population census of San Ildefonso
Year	Pop.	±% p.a.
1903	5,326	—
1918	9,190	+3.70%
1939	16,395	+2.79%
1948	18,288	+1.22%
1960	26,140	+3.02%
1970	34,559	+2.83%
1975	39,593	+2.76%
1980	44,931	+2.56%
1990	59,598	+2.87%
1995	69,319	+2.87%
2000	79,956	+3.11%
2007	93,438	+2.17%
2010	95,000	+0.61%
2015	104,471	+1.83%
2020	115,713	+2.17%
2024	123,140	+1.50%
Source: Philippine Statistics Authority

In the 2020 census, the population of San Ildefonso, Bulacan, was 115,713 people, with a density of 900 inhabitants per square kilometer or 2,300 inhabitants per square mile.

== Economy ==
Poverty incidence of San Ildefonso (%)

Source: Philippine Statistics Authority

Major industries

- Cement
- Pyrotechnics
- Feed mills
- Food/food processing
- Garments
- Hat making
- Wood crafts
- High-yield crops
- Marble/marble processing
- Metalcraft

Major products

- Bakeries and sweet preserves
- Chicharon
- Poultry and livestock
- Rice
- High value crops
- Marbles
- Vegetables
- Fruits

== Elected Officials ==
2025-2028 San Ildefonso, Bulacan Officials
Position	Name	Party
Mayor	Fernando S. Galvez	NUP
Vice Mayor	Chariz G. Cabande	NUP
Councilors	Joselito G. Bautista Jr.	NUP
Councilors	Jaycel C. Domingo	NUP
Councilors	Teemee I. Miguel	NUP
Councilors	Andrea Lindsey B. Duran	NUP
Councilors	Alexander J. Galvez	NUP
Councilors	Krizia Jewel V. Silverio	PFP
Councilors	John Paul S. Magbitang	PFP
Councilors	Michael D. Angeles	NUP
Ex Officio Municipal Council Members
ABC President	TBD	Nonpartisan
SK Federation President	TBD	Nonpartisan

== Education ==
There are two schools district offices which govern all educational institutions within the municipality. They oversee the management and operations of all private and public, from primary to secondary schools. These are San Ildefonso North District Office, and San Ildefonso South District Office.

=== Public Schools ===
==== Elementary Education ====
The town has numerous public schools offering elementary and high school education. Some of the elementary public schools are:

South District

No	Name
1	Pinaod Elementary School
2	Malipampang Elementary School
3	Maasim Elementary School
4	Palapala Elementary School
5	Gabihan Elementary School
6	Akle Elementary School
7	Sapang Putik Elementary School
8	Basuit Elementary School
9	Upig Elementary School
10	Bagong Baryo Elementary School
11	Alagao Elementary School
12	Matimbubong Elementary School
13	Casalat Elementary School
14	Sitio Pag- Asa Elementary School
15	Narra Elementary School
16	Sitio Biga Elementary School
17	Pasong Bangkal Elementary School (Satellite School)

North District

No	Name
1	San Ildefonso Elementary School
2	Anyatam Elementary School
3	Bubulong Malaki Elementary School
4	Bubulong Munti Elementary School
5	Bulusukan Elementary School
6	Calawitan Elementary School
7	Makapilapil Elementary School
8	Pulong Tamo Elementary School
9	Sumandig Elementary School
10	Santa Catalina Mat. Elementary School
11	Umpucan Elementary School
12	Nabaong Garlang Elementary School
13	Calasag Elementary School
14	Lapnit Elementary School
15	San Juan Elementary School
16	Mataas na Parang Elementary School
17	Buhol na Mangga Elementary School
18	Garlang Elementary School
19	Santa Catalina Bata Elementary School
20	Telapatio Elementary School

==== Secondary Education ====
Some of the public high schools are:

No	Name
1	San Ildefonso National High School
2	Calawitan National High School
3	Akle High School
4	Santa Catalina High School
5	Upig High school
6	Gabihan High school

==== Tertiary and College Education ====
Some of the tertiary schools are:

No	Name
1	Bulacan State Agricultural University

=== Private Schools ===
Some of the private schools offering education

No	Name	Nursery & Kindergarten	Elementary	Secondary	Senior High School	Tertiary / College
1	AMG Skilled Hands Technological College (ASHTEC)			Yes	Yes	Yes
2	Motessori De San Ildefonso		Yes	Yes	Yes	
3	Saint Paul School of San Ildefonso		Yes			
4	Saint John School		Yes	Yes	Yes	
5	Liceo De Buenavista			Yes	Yes	
6	Goldenville School of Montessori		Yes	Yes	Yes	
7	Veritas Learning Center		Yes			
8	Solagracia Alliance School, Inc.	Yes				
9	Colegio De La Santisima Eucaristia (CDLSE)			Yes	Yes	

== Notable personalities ==
- Yuka Saso – 2021 U.S. Women's Open Golf Champion. Filipino Japanese amateur golfer. Two-time Asian Games gold medalist in individual and team events.
- Cardozo Luna – politician; Undersecretary of Department National Defence.
- Joyce Ching – Filipino-Chinese actress

== Gallery ==
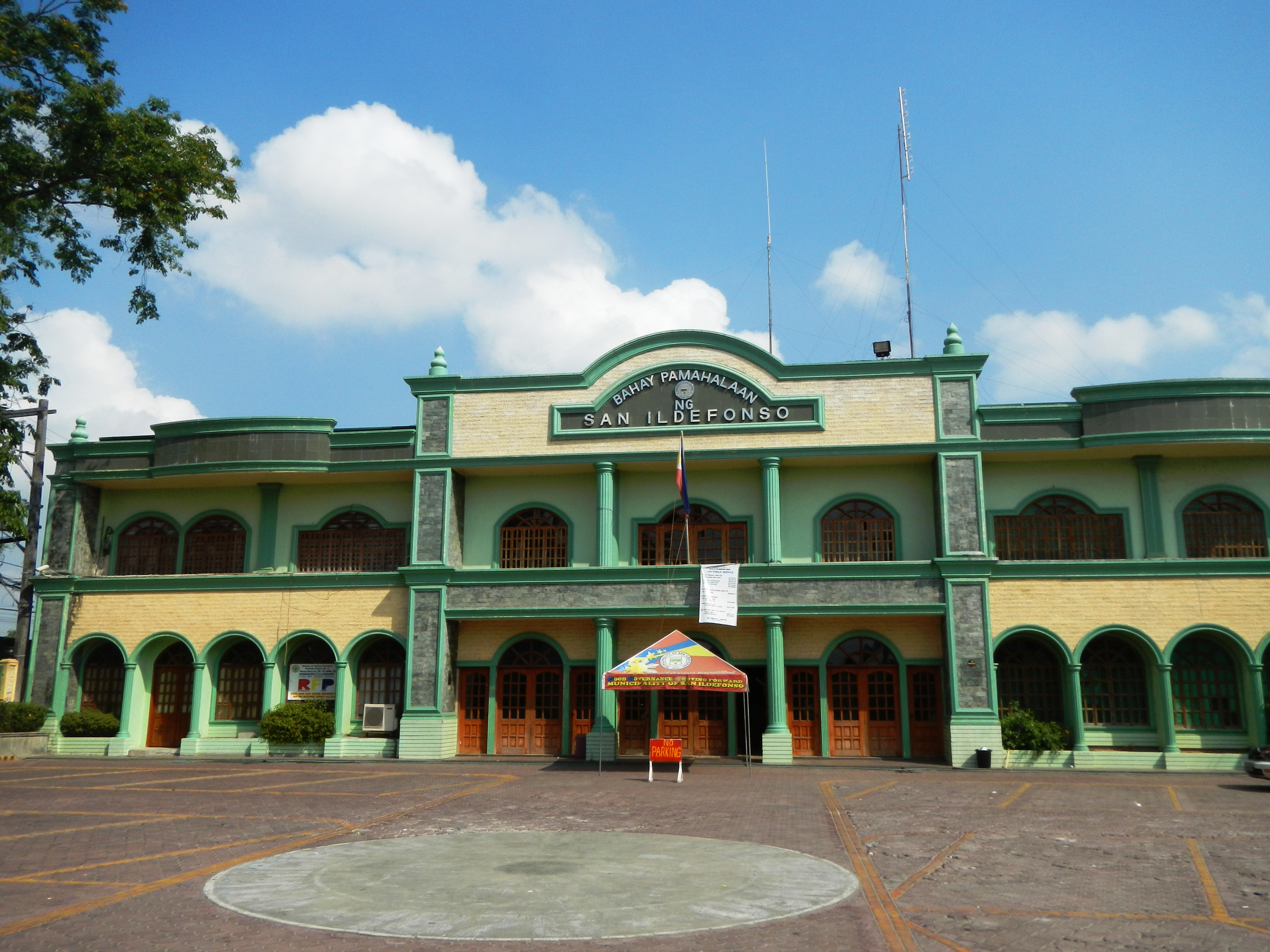
Municipal hall

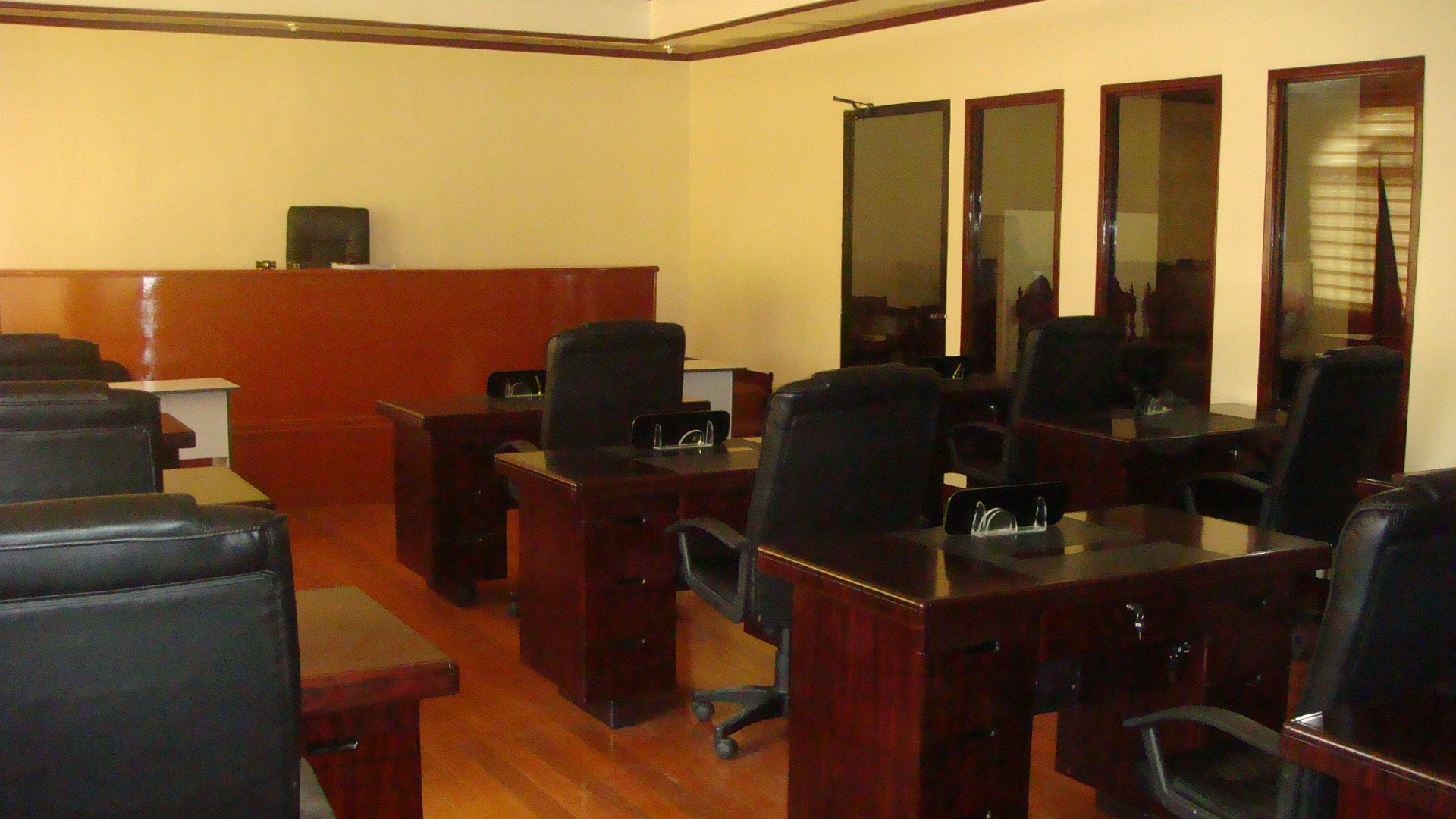
Sangguniang Bayan Session Hall

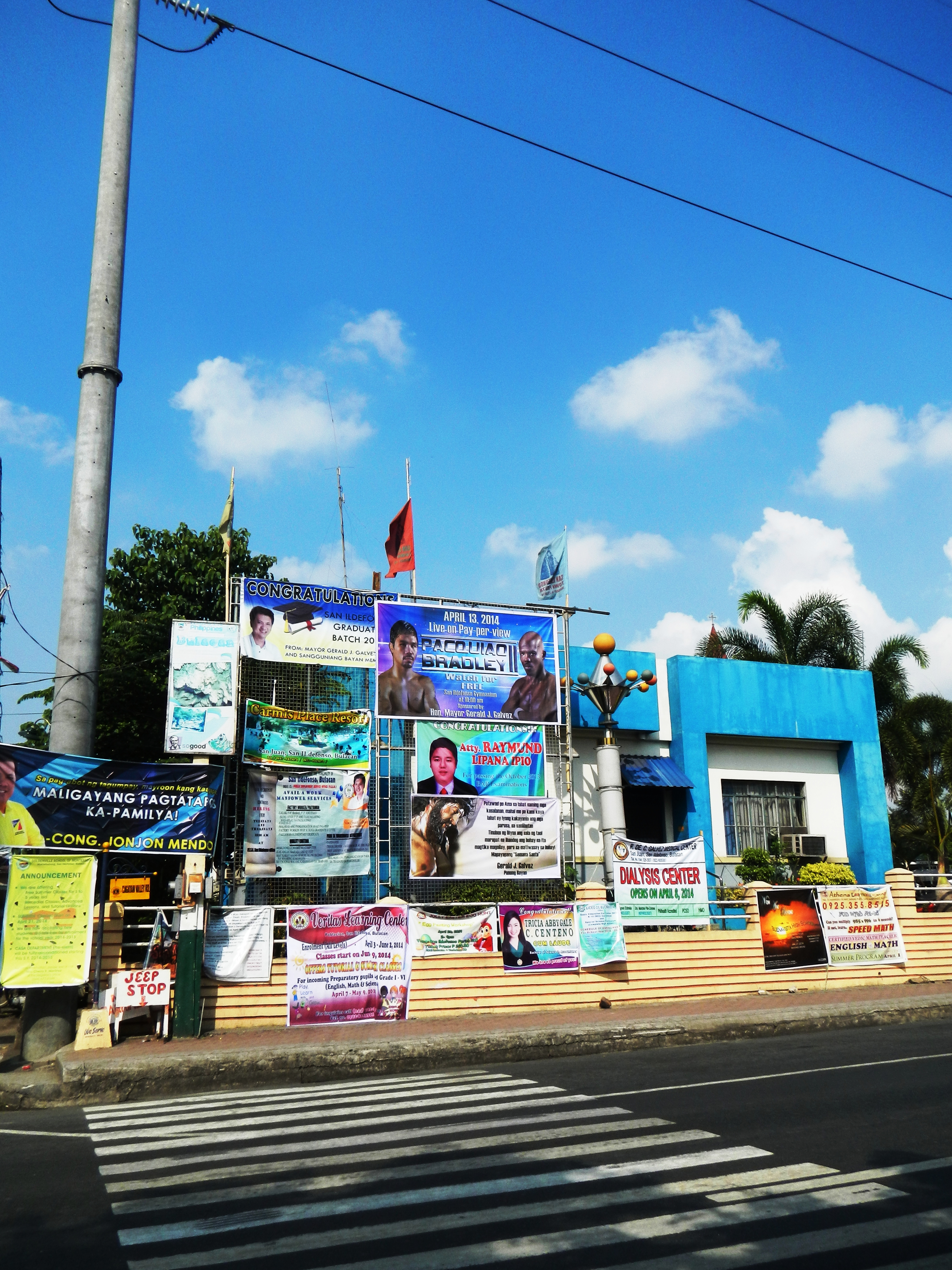
San Ildefonso (MPS) - PNP Police Regional Office 1

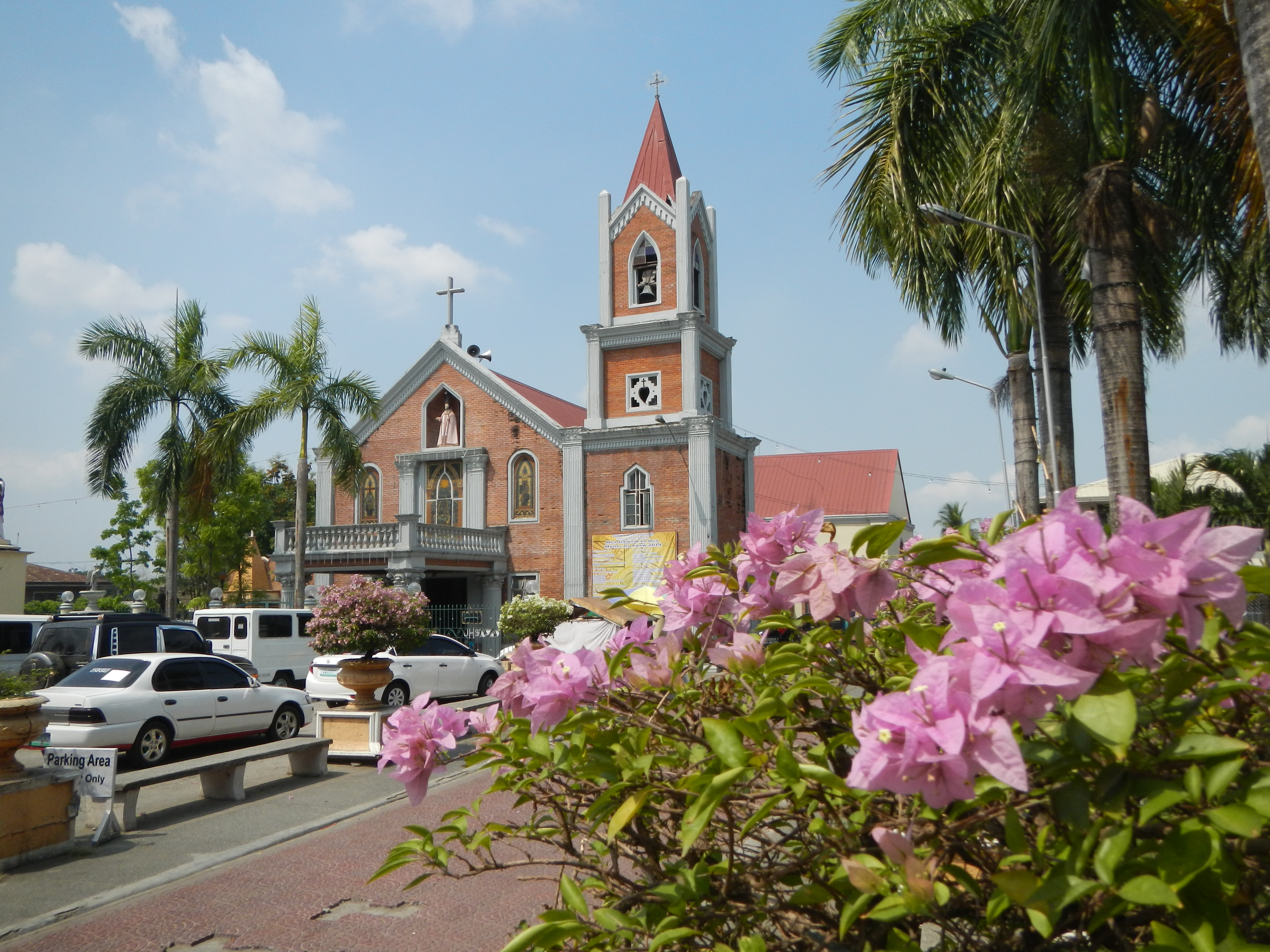
St. Ildephonsus of Toledo Church (Poblacion)
