= Battle of San Rafael =

- Part of the Philippine Revolution
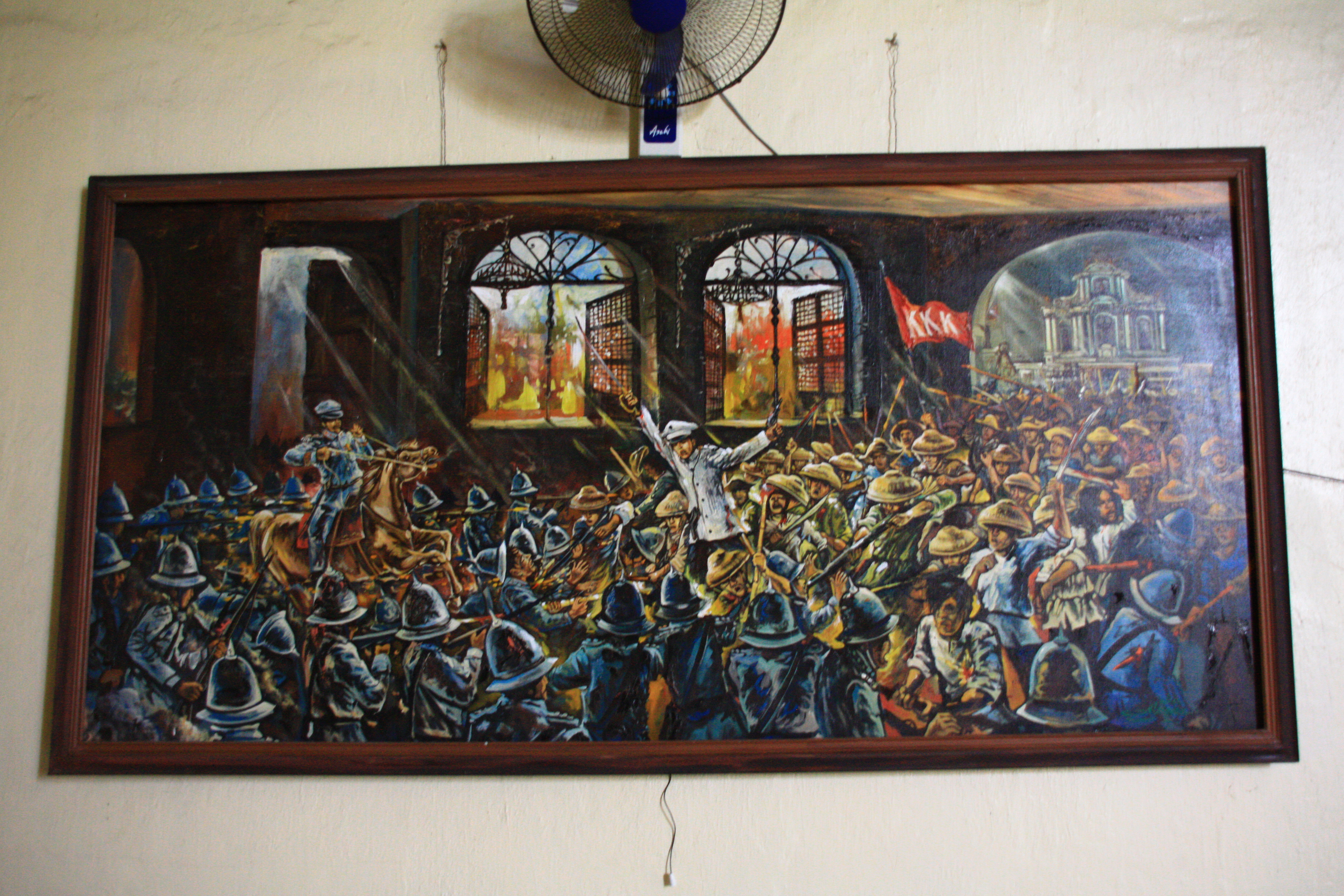
Date	November 30, 1896
Location	San Rafael, Bulacan, Philippines
Result	Spanish victory

Belligerents
Katipunan	Kingdom of Spain

Commanders and leaders
Anacleto Enríquez †; Vicente Enríquez	Francisco López Arteaga

Strength
Unknown	Unknown

Casualties and losses
Heavy	Light

The Battle of San Rafael fought between Filipino revolutionaries under the leadership of Anacleto “Matanglawin” Enriquez against the Spanish army headed by Commandant Francisco López Arteaga.

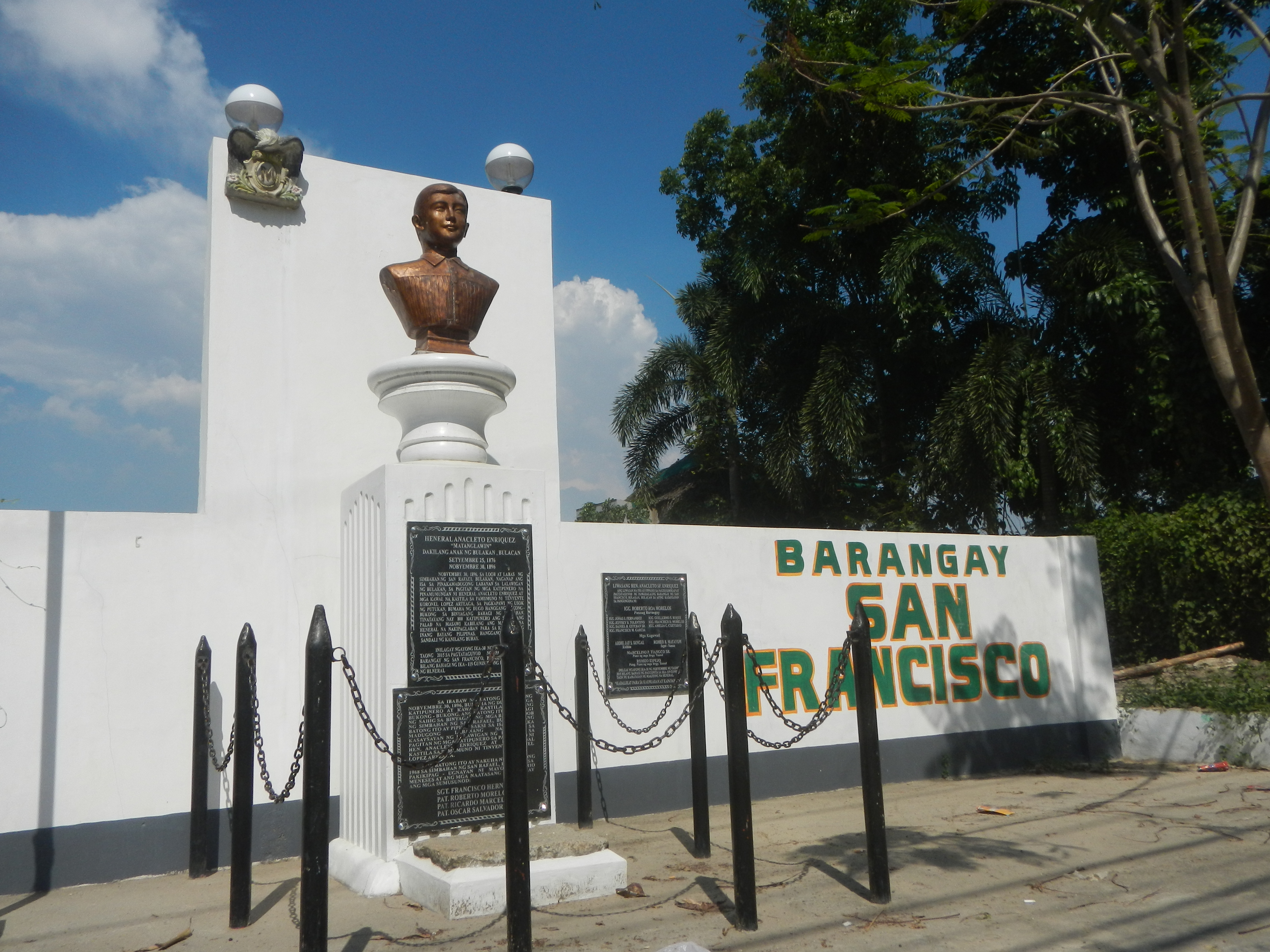
Enriquez's Bulakan monument

== History ==
Enriquez grew with his wealthy family in San Nicolas, Bulakan, Bulacan. He is a nephew of Marcelo del Pilar and cousin of General Gregorio del Pilar. Vicente "Bong" Enriquez in a grandchild of his sibling Colonel Vicente. He met Jose Rizal in the Hotel de Oriente, Manila. In 1895 Anacleto joined the Katipunan. In 1896, he, under code name "Matanglawin", as vice president, Doroteo Karagdag and Vicente, formed "Balangay Uliran", a group of Katipuneros in Bulakan, under Supremo Andrés Bonifacio. Uliran converged with General Isidoro Dayao Torres' "Balangay Apuy" in Malolos, later as "Sangguniang Apuy".

=== Attack ===
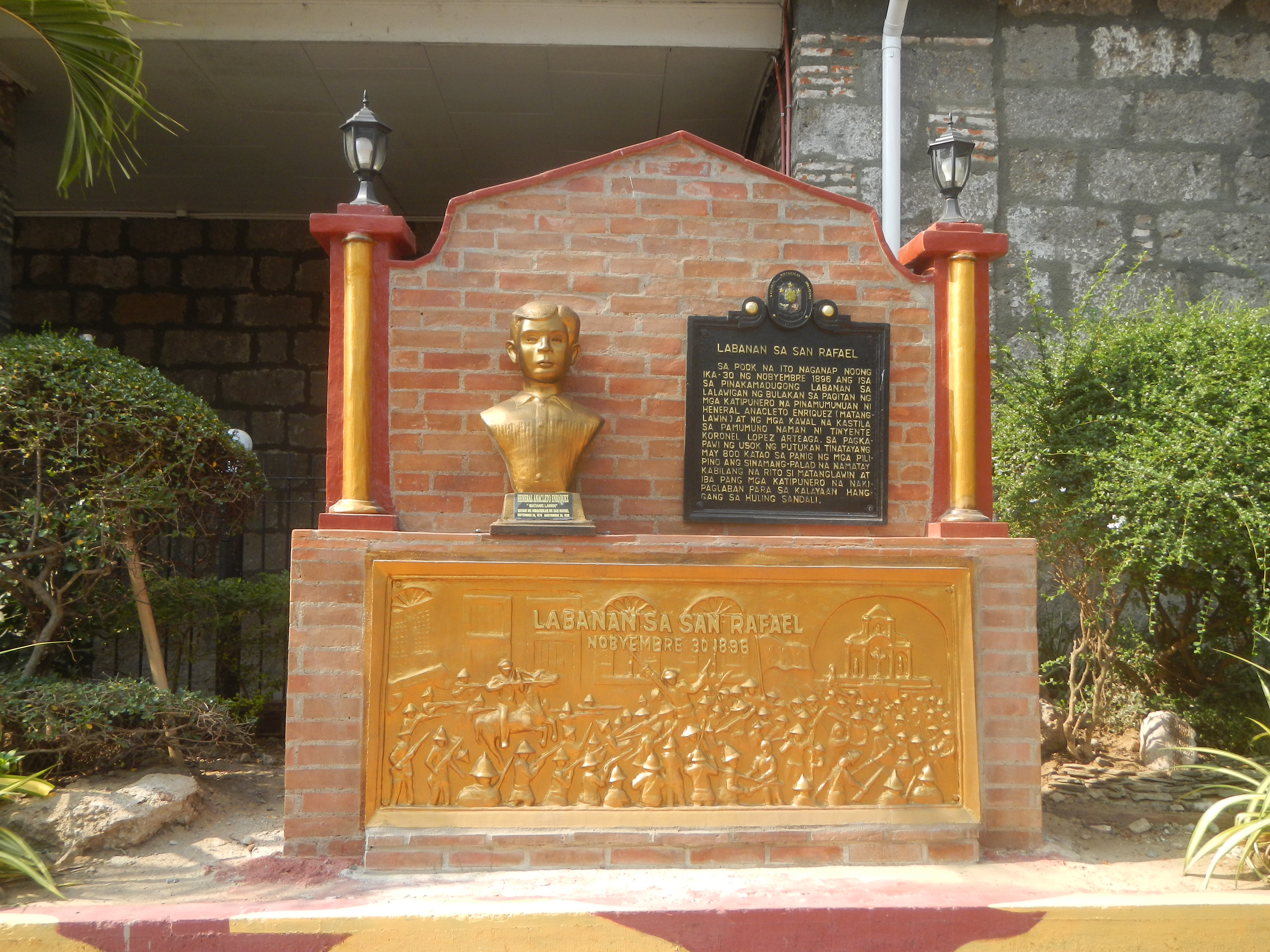
Church monuments

On their way from the town of Paombong to the mountain ranges of Bulacan, General Isidoro Torres of Malolos decided to divide the troop of Katipuneros into two: one group under his supervision while the other under the guidance of General Anacleto Enriquez and his brother Colonel Vicente Enriquez. The group of General Enriquez was supposedly heading to the town of Baliuag but decided to stay instead in San Rafael, believing it to be a strategic site. They were unaware that a Spanish troop formation from Manila was heading towards San Rafael prepared to eliminate them. The battle started at around 7 a.m. on November 30, 1896. The Spanish forces were so strong that General Enriquez ordered a retreat to the San Rafael. Sometime in the middle of the battle, some of the Filipino troops including Colonel Enriquez were separated from the rest of the group and headed to the town of Bigaa (now Balagtas). At around noon, the Spanish army forced the church doors open and murdered the Filipino revolutionaries seeking shelter in the church. It is estimated that nearly 800 people were killed in the battle, most of whom were children and other locals.

== Aftermath ==
The number of casualties was so immense that it was believed that blood spilled in the church reached ankle-deep. The gobernadorcillo of San Rafael ordered a mass grave to be made near the church. It is believed that the Battle of San Rafael inspired the young general Gregorio Del Pilar (a close friend of General Anacleto Enriquez) to join the revolution against Spain.

== Legacy ==
General Anacleto "Etoy" SF Enriquez (September 25, 1876 to November 30, 1896) is honored by a bust and historical marker at Liwasan Heneral Anacleto SF Enriquez (Matanglawin) in San Francisco, Bulakan, Bulacan.

At the San Juan de Dios Church, Enriquez's bust and the Battle's historical marker with relief were also installed.
