= San Juan de Dios Church (San Rafael) =

Roman Catholic church in Bulacan, Philippines

San Rafael Church
- San Juan de Dios Parish Church
- Parish of Saint John of God
- Parroquia de San Juan de Dios (Spanish)
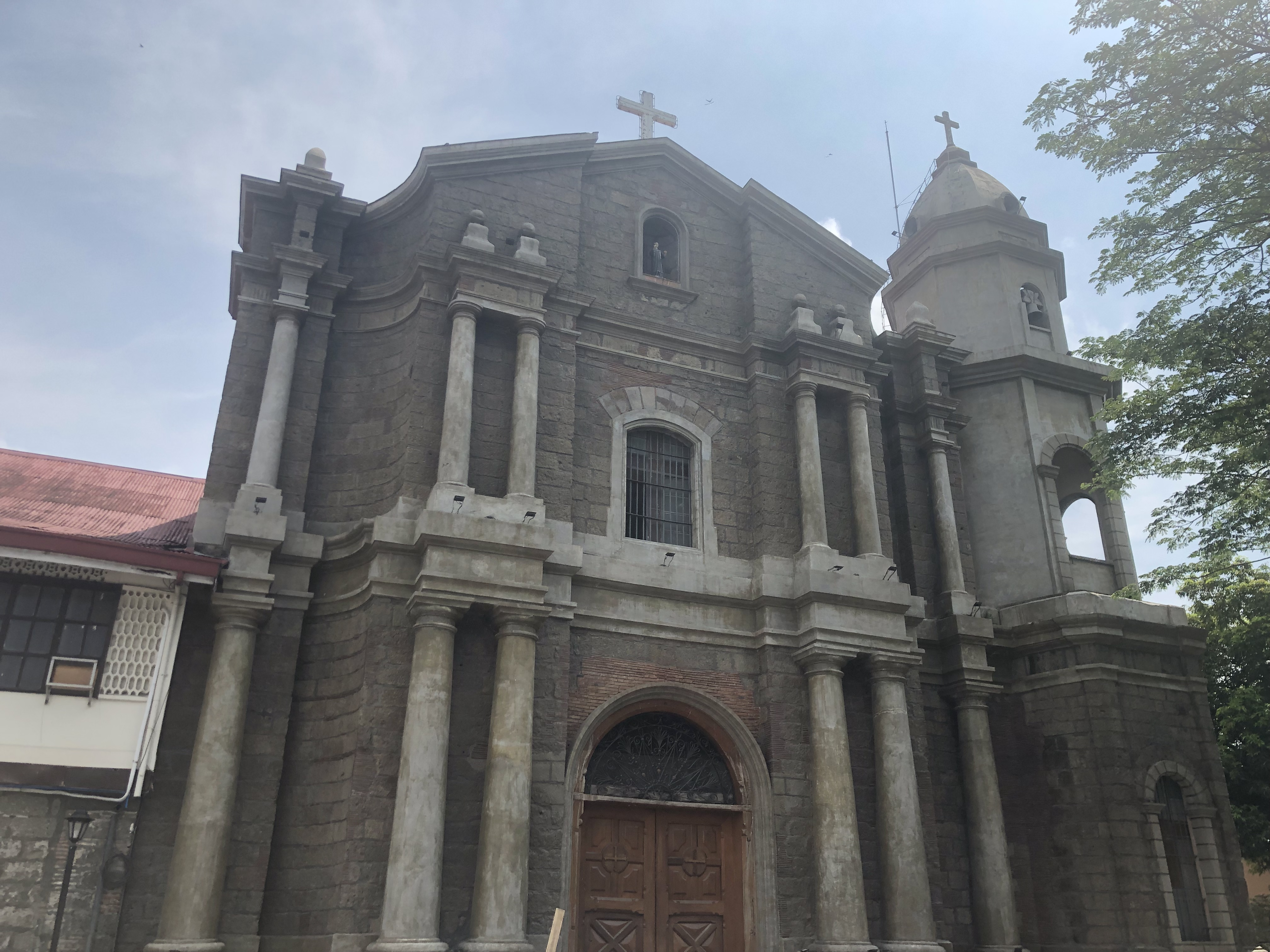
- Church facade in 2026

- Location in Bulacan Location in Luzon Location in the Philippines
- 14°57′30″N 120°57′47″E
- Location: Poblacion, San Rafael, Bulacan
- Country: Philippines
- Denomination: Roman Catholic

History
- Status: Parish church
- Dedication: John of God
- Consecrated: 1750

Architecture
- Functional status: Active
- Architectural type: Church building
- Style: Partido Baroque

Administration
- Archdiocese: Manila
- Diocese: Malolos

Clergy
- Archbishop: Jose Advincula
- Bishop: Dennis Cabanada Villarojo
- Priest: Rev. Fr. Gerardo Fortunato

San Juan de Dios Parish Church, commonly known as San Rafael Church, is an 18th-century Roman Catholic church situated in Brgy. Poblacion, in San Rafael, Bulacan, Philippines. It is under the jurisdiction of the Diocese of Malolos. Its titular patron is St. John of God; Saint Raphael, archangel, is the secondary patron saint. The church was the site of the Battle of San Rafael, wherein hundreds of retreating Filipino soldiers and civilians lost their lives during a battle with the Spanish on November 30, 1896. A historical marker by the National Historical Commission of the Philippines was installed in front of the church in 1997 to commemorate the massacre of an estimated 800 Filipinos.

== History ==
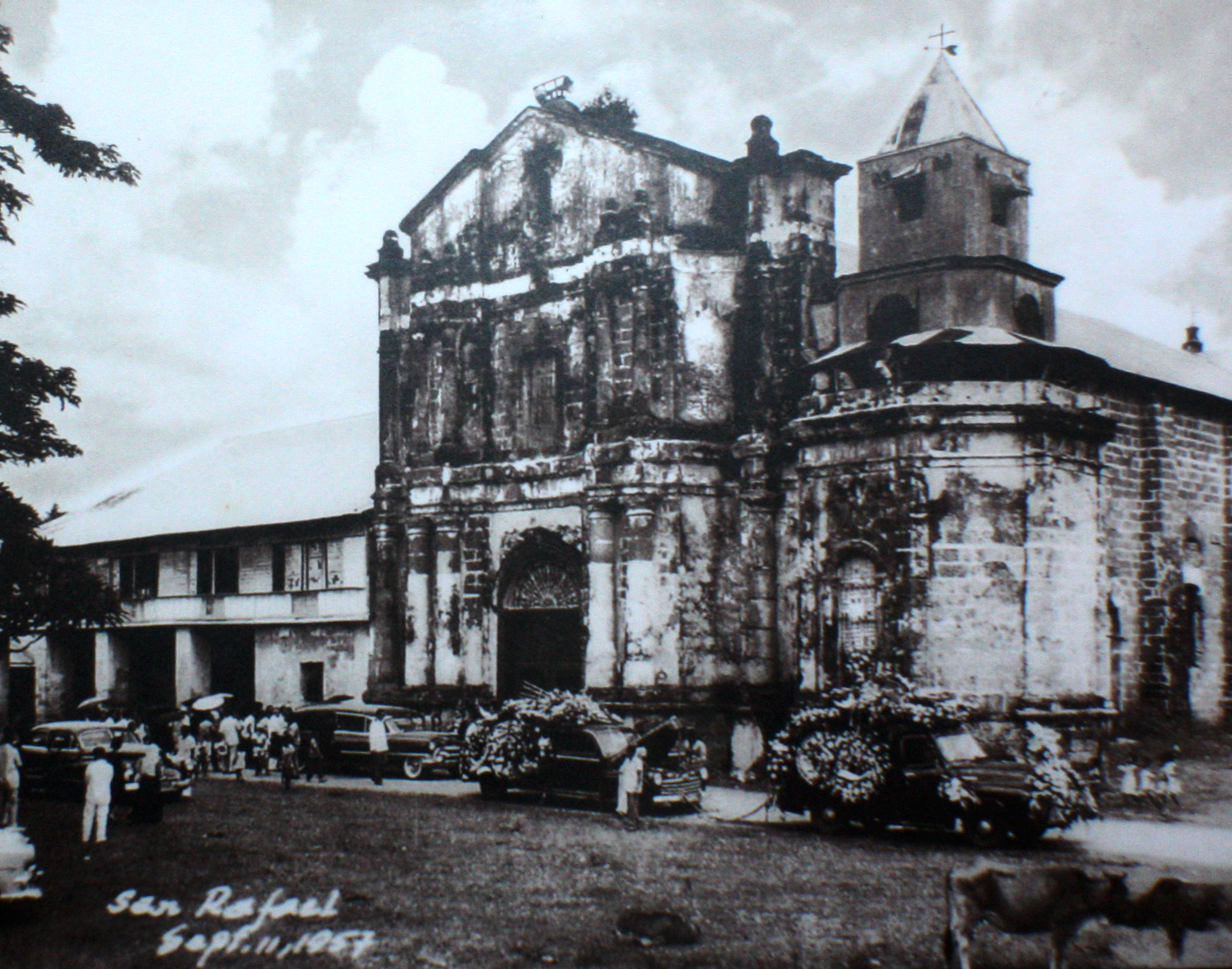
1950s Archival photo of San Juan de Dios Church displayed at Museo San Rafael

The town of San Rafael began as part of the Hacienda de Buenavista under the San Juan de Dios brothers. Though belonging to that religious group, the place was however administered by the Augustinian friars who established the mission in 1750. The date of the construction of the present stone church is debatable although some sources indicate that the convent was built in 1863, which can be assumed to be the time when the church was also being erected. Fray Antonio Piernavieja, OSA who served as parish priest from 1868 to 1873 and from 1875 to 1877 finished the convent. Rev. Fr. Ranielle Pineda is the church's present Parish Priest, and with Rev. Fr. Alvin Pila as Parochial Vicar.

=== Battle of San Rafael ===
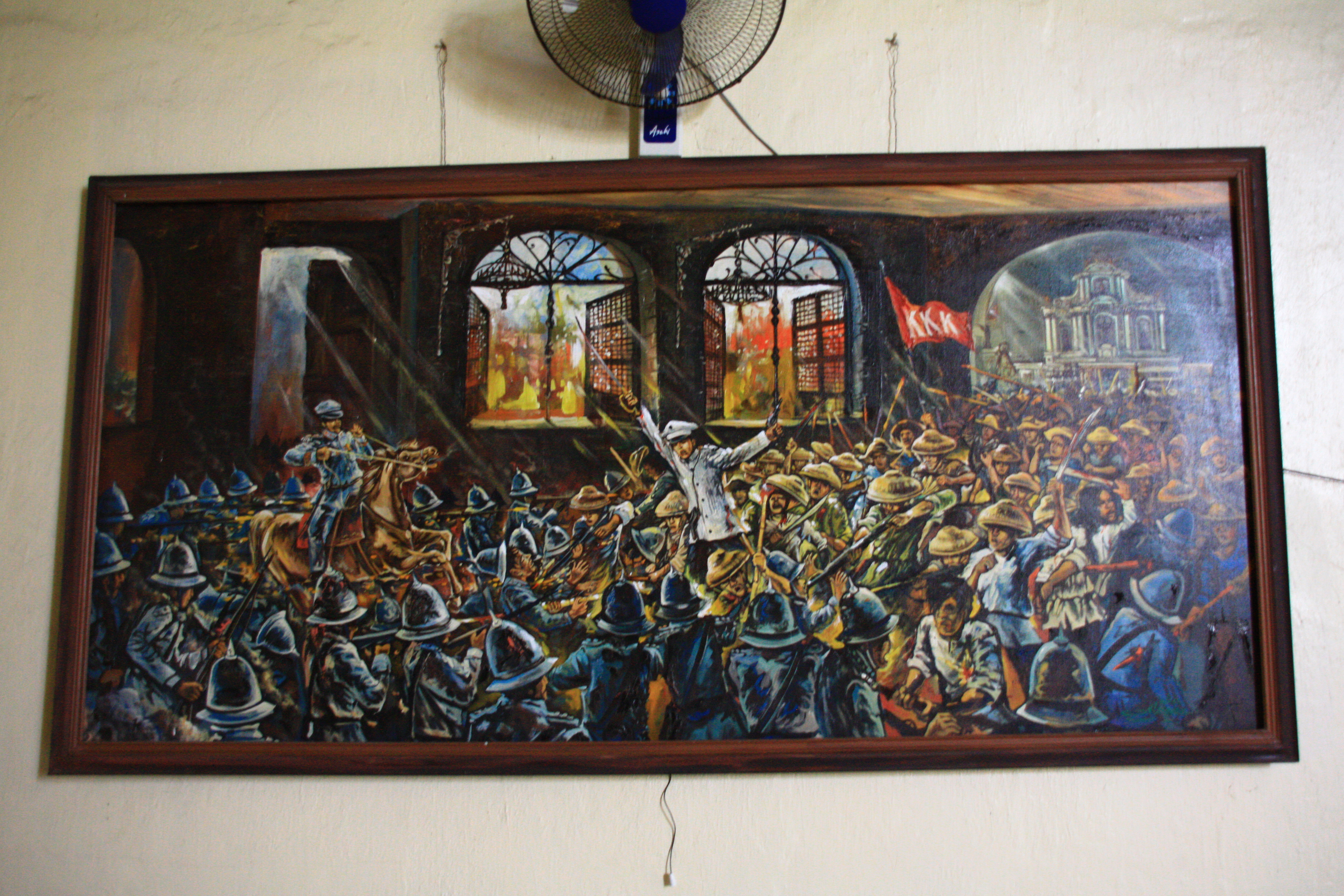
Painting of the Battle of San Rafael 1896

The church is the site of the Battle of San Rafael, a battle fought between Filipino revolutionaries under the leadership of General Anacleto “Matanglawin” Enriquez against the Spanish army headed by Commandant Lopez Arteaga. On their way from the town of Paombong to the mountain ranges of Bulacan, General Isidoro Torres of Malolos decided to divide the troop of Katipuneros into two: one group under his supervision while the other under the guidance of General Enriquez and his brother Colonel Vicente Enriquez. The group of General Enriquez was supposedly heading to the town of Baliuag but decided to stay instead in San Rafael, believing it to be a strategic site. Unknowingly, a Spanish troop from Manila heading towards San Rafael, prepared to silence the 20,000 Filipino insurgents. The battle started at around 7 a.m. on November 30, 1896. The Spanish forces were so strong that General Enriquez ordered a retreat to the church of San Rafael. Sometime in the middle of the battle, some of the Filipino troops including Colonel Enriquez were separated from the rest of the group and headed to the town of Bigaa (now Balagtas). At around noon, the Spanish army forced the church doors open and murdered the Filipino revolutionaries seeking shelter in the church. It is estimated that 800 people were killed in the battle, most of whom were children, women and other locals. The number of casualties was so immense that it was believed that blood spilled in the church reached ankle-deep. The gobernadorcillo of San Rafael ordered a mass grave to be made near the church. It is believed that the Battle of San Rafael inspired the young general Gregorio Del Pilar (a close friend of General Anacleto Enriquez) to join the revolution against Spain.

=== Sisa, Basilio and Crispin in San Rafael ===
Residents of San Rafael believe that national hero Jose Rizal was inspired to create the characters Sisa, Basilio and Crispin (in his work Noli Me Tángere) by a real-life story in San Rafael. Recalling the story from Rizal's novel, the two brothers were serving as bell-ringers in the church to help their mother by earning money. On one occasion, the sacristan mayor accused Crispin of stealing an amount of money. Crispin was punished by the sacristan mayor and the town curate, Padre Salvi, and was believed to have died inside the church premises. As proof of the local legend, locals point to a blood-stained wall off the side of the convent in a small room where supposedly the young “Crispin” was tortured to death.

Other residents of San Rafael believe that the town was the inspiration for San Diego in Rizal's novel. They said that the name of Crisostomo Ibarra's father in the novel, "Rafael" came from the town’s name. Aside from that, there is a place in San Rafael called "Pasong Intsik" or "Chinese Pass" were the early Chinese merchants of San Rafael resided. In the novel, Rizal told that Rafael's body was formerly buried in the San Diego cemetery before it was exhumed and thrown to the river.

== Architecture ==
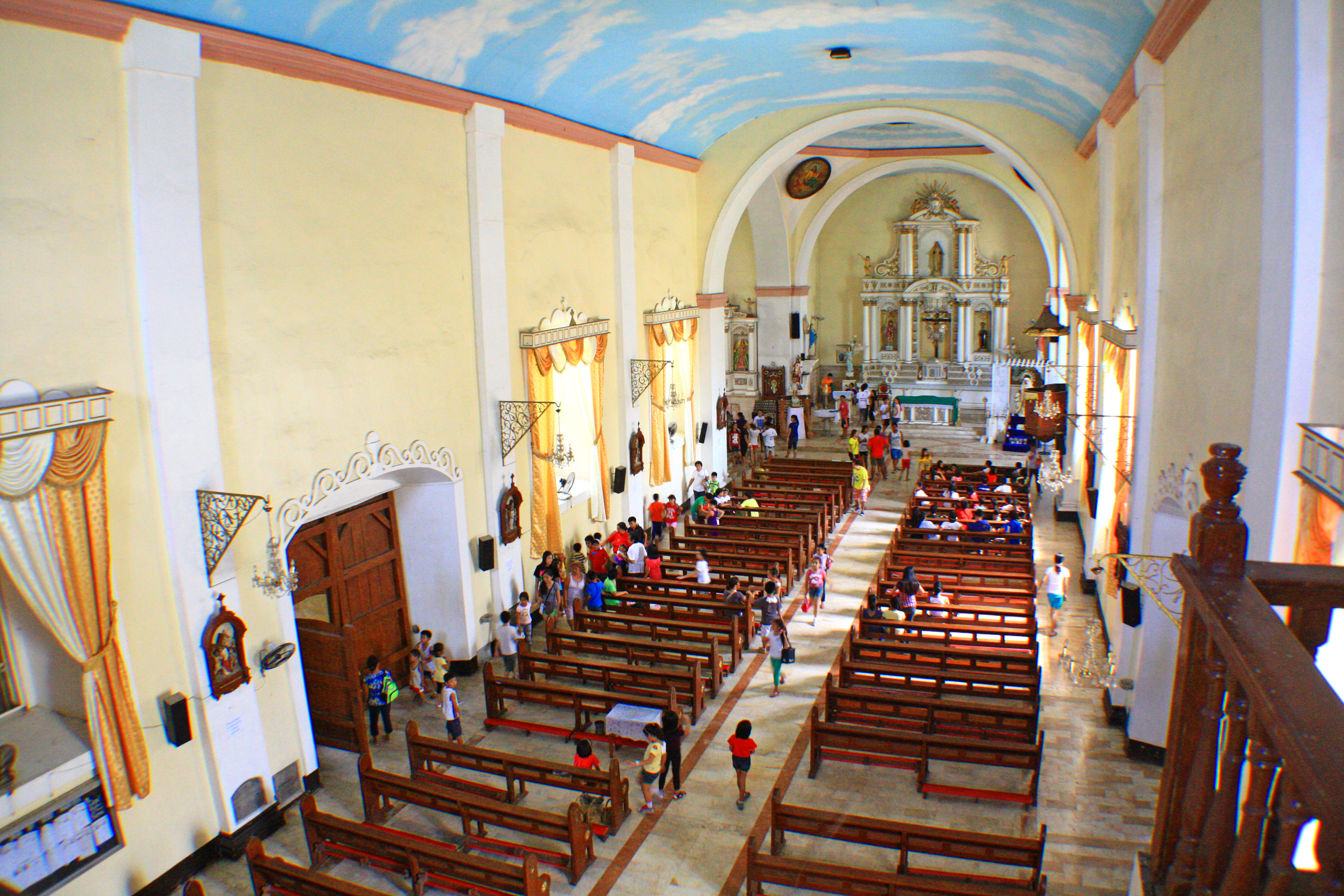
Church interior in 2014

The San Juan de Dios Church is a classic example of Partido Baroque architecture in the Philippines. The style, popular from the early to mid-19th century, boasts of a curved façade as opposed to the flat ones typically found in other Baroque churches in the country. The church façade has two openings: a main portal now partially covered with a concrete portico and a semi-circular arch window in the center of the second level which provides light to the choir loft. The window is flanked by pairs of Tuscan-inspired columns extending up to the pediment and capped off by finials. The pediment has a niche in the center with an image of a saint. To the right of the church is the three-level octagonal belfry, the second and third levels of which are later additions to the earlier first level.

== Features ==
=== San Juan de Dios Parish Museum ===
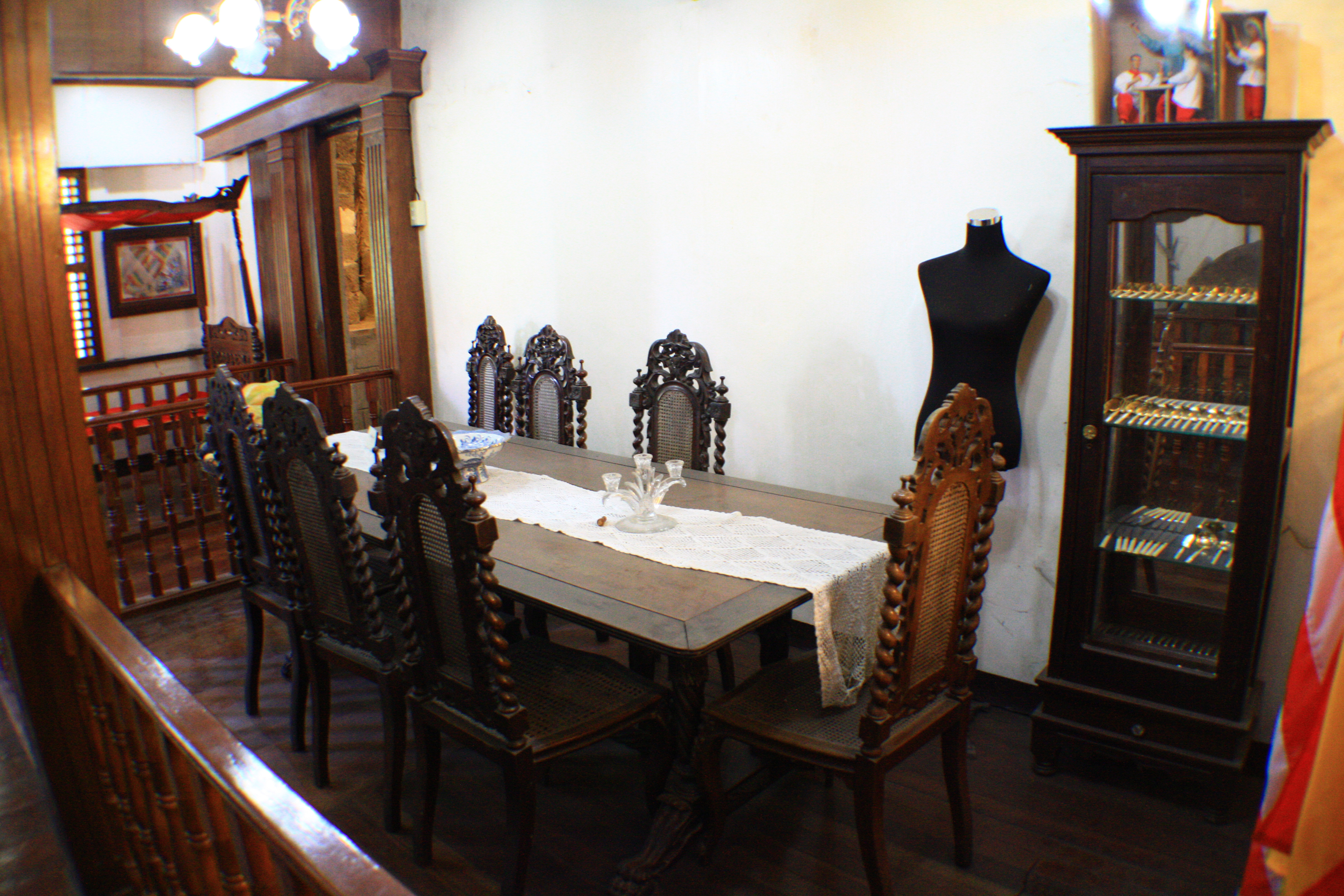
Museo San Rafael interior

The second level of the convent has been converted into a museum housing different historical artifacts and religious items. The Museo San Rafael was officially opened on September 29, 2006, during the feast of San Rafael, coinciding with the 256th founding anniversary of the town. Besides the main hall of the convent, three rooms now house different exhibits. The first room, named Museo ng Bayan (Museum of the Town) houses different Spanish-era items common to old San Rafael like an old rice mill, traditional clothes and house furniture. Located between the convent and the church is a small room containing a painting in memory of the characters Basilio and Crispin from Jose Rizal's Noli Me Tangere. A life-size statue of Jose Rizal can also be found inside the room. Farther inside the room, the deep crevice between the stone walls is said to be a well. In the next room, called Museo ng Simbahan (Museum of the Church) are collections of religious items including old stampitas and record books of the parish, a scaled replica of the church retablo, old santos, heavily embroidered vestments and an old episcopal chair. The third room, named Museo ng mga Anghel (Museum of the Angels) is an exhibit of different artworks of angels in recognition of the town's other patron saint, Archangel Raphael. The town has held the annual Angel festival every September 29 since 2002.

== Image gallery ==
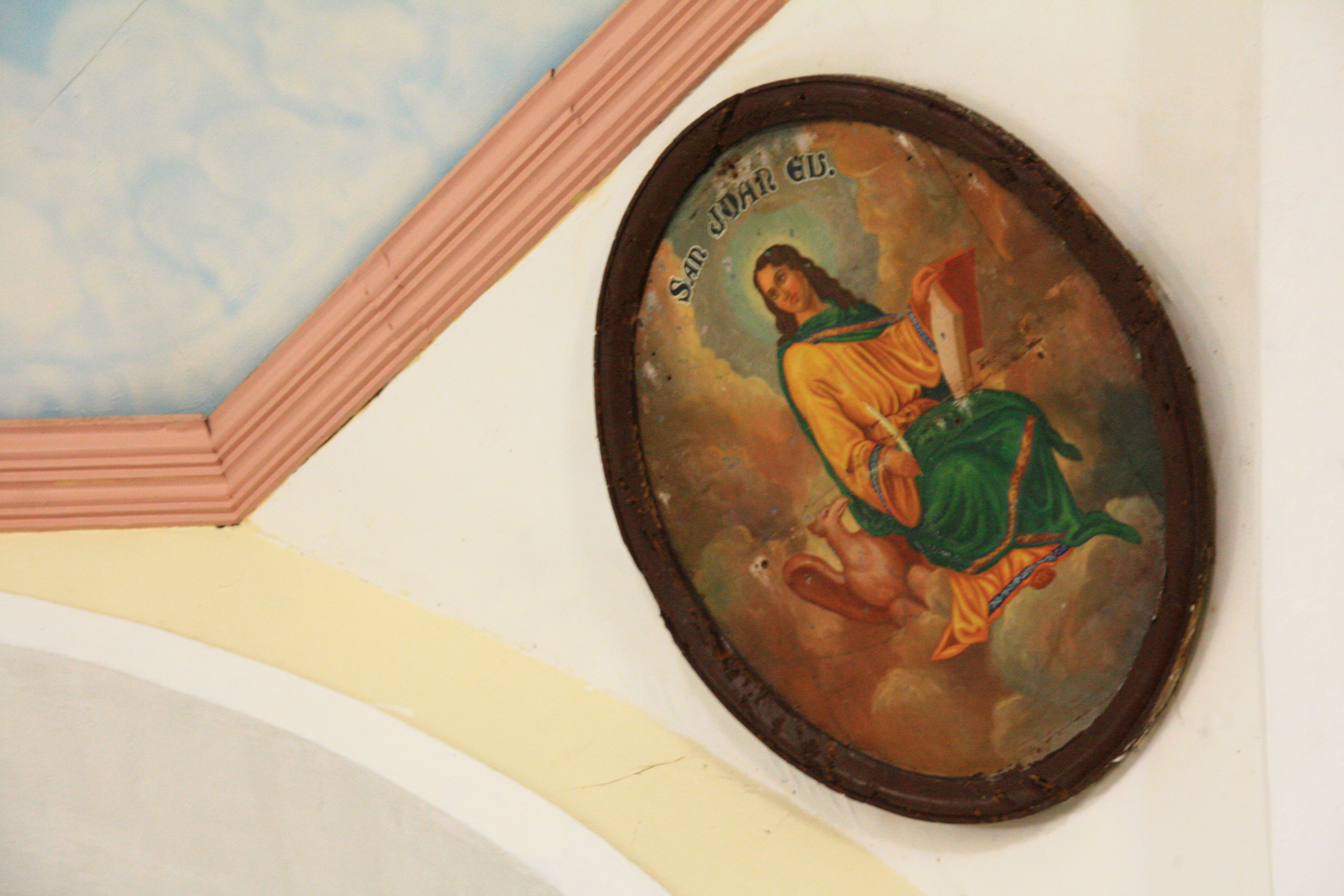
Evangelist painting at intersection of the nave and transept

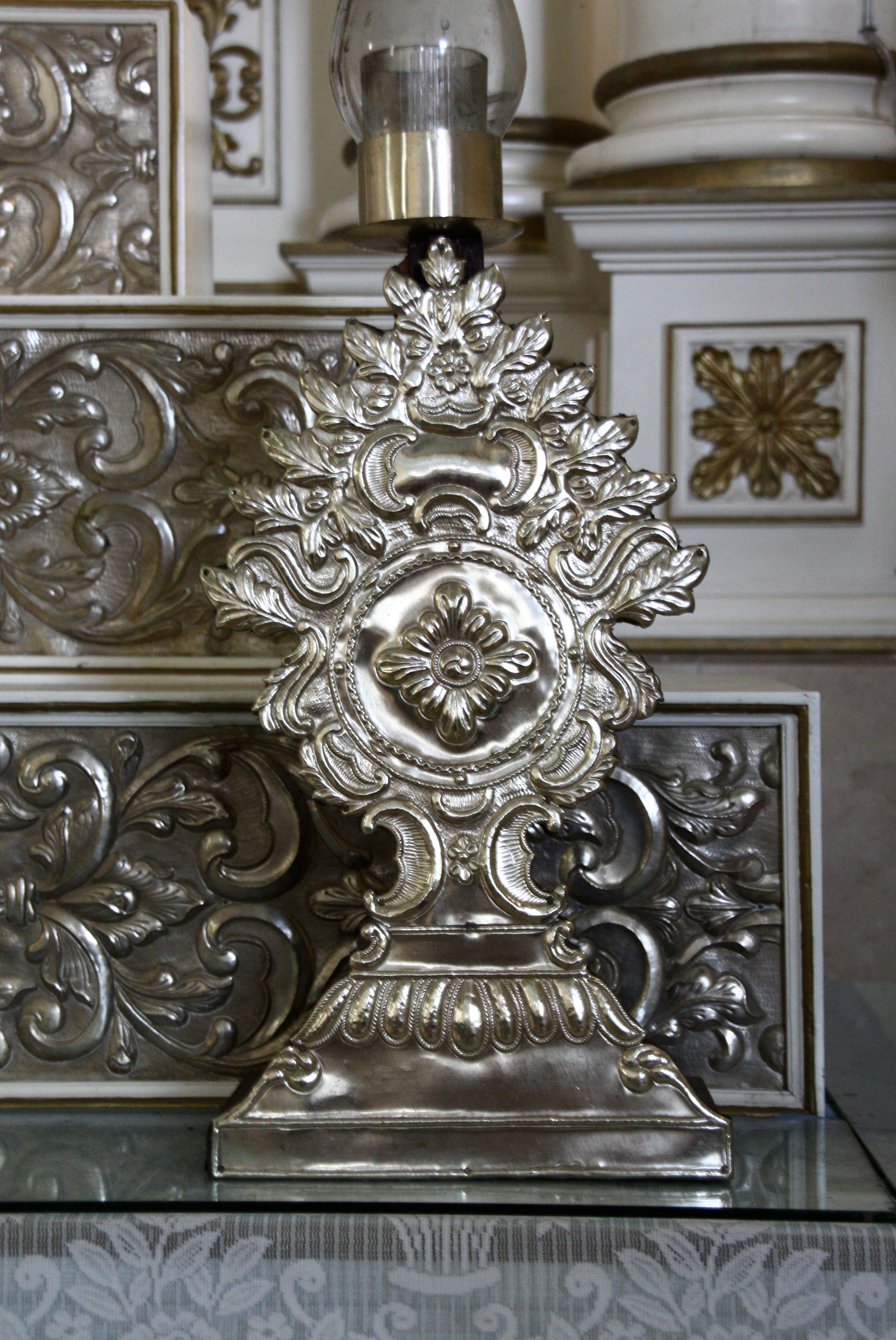
Details of the silver altarpiece

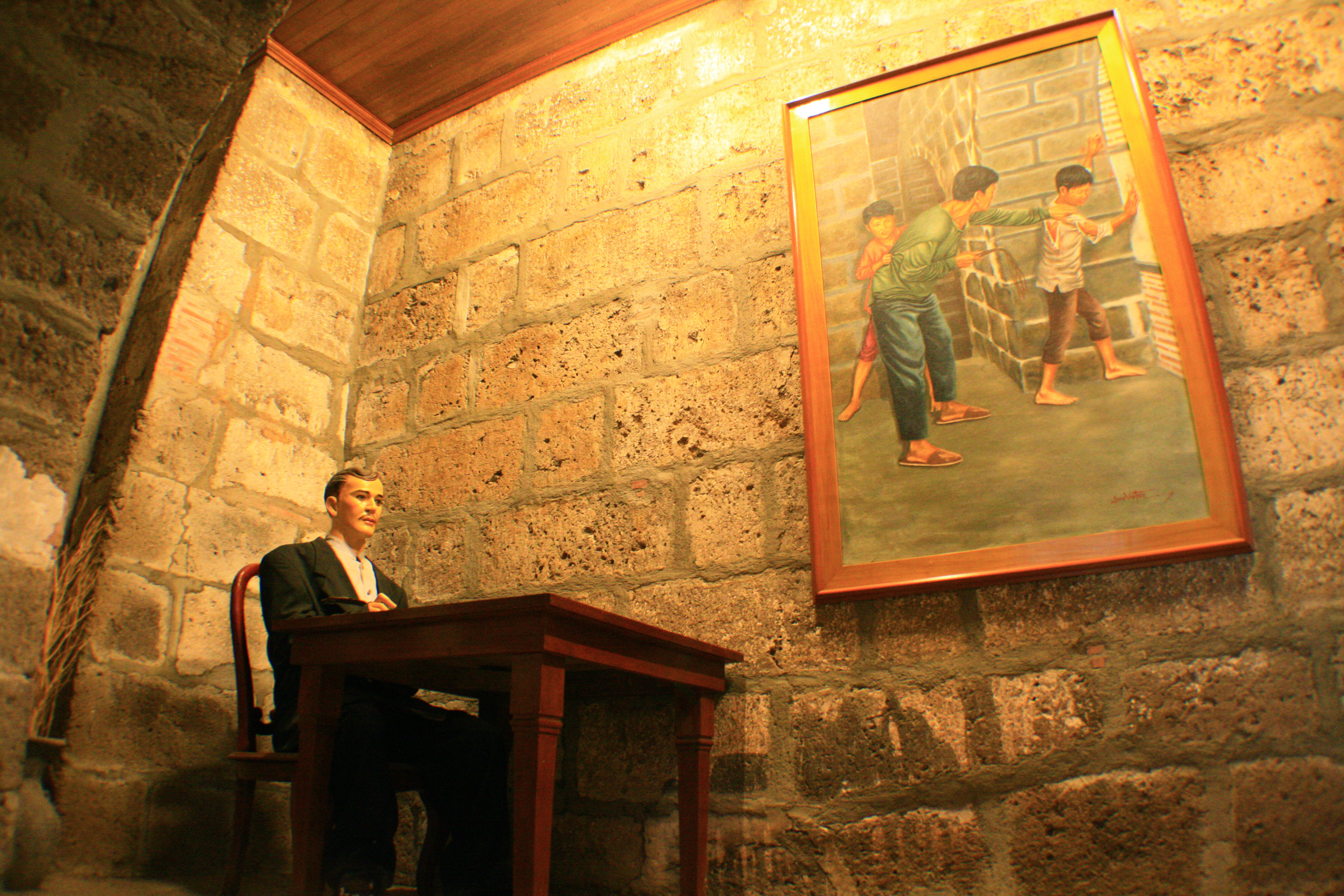
Room dedicated to Basilio and Cripsin (of Noli Me Tangere)*

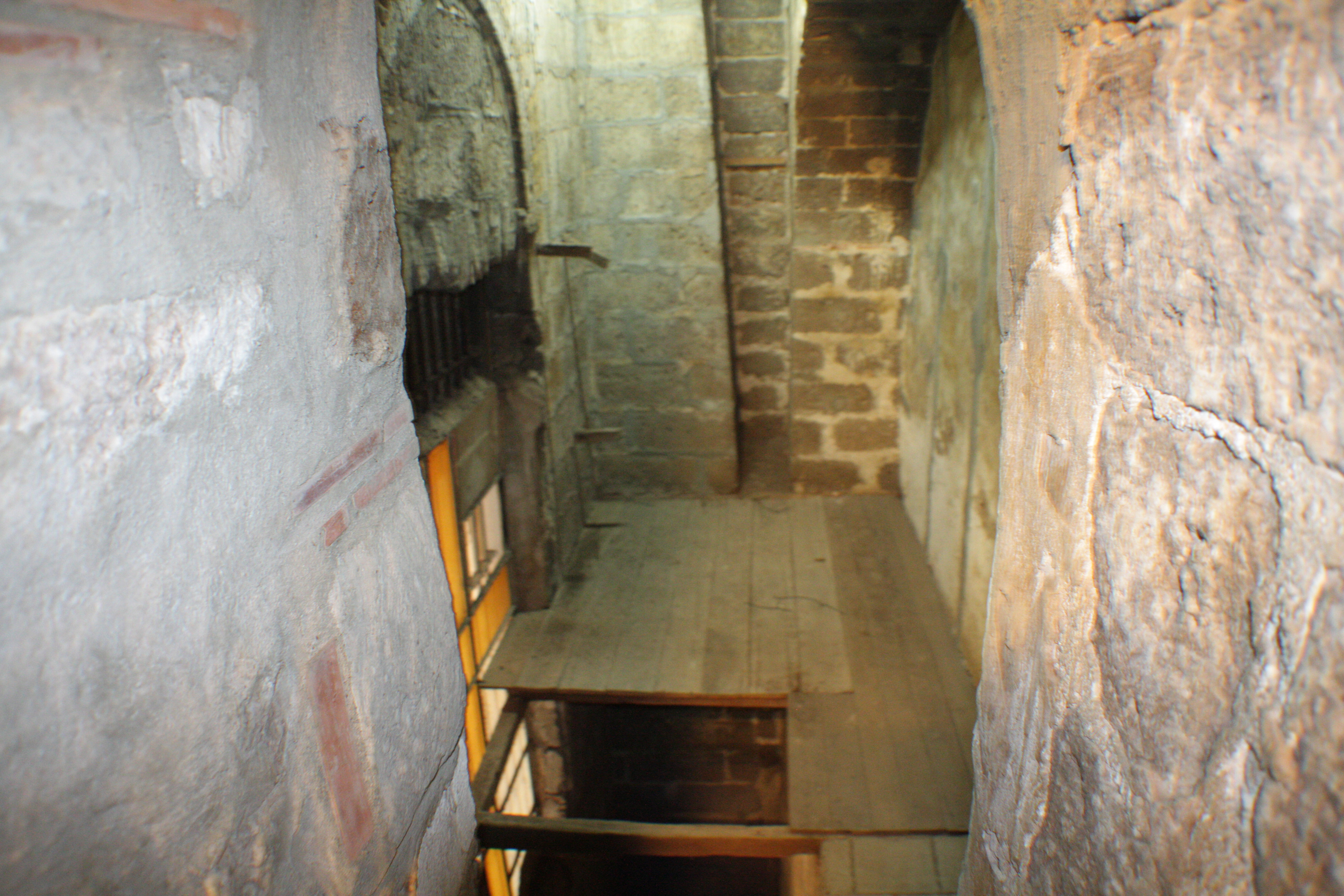
Room between church and convent

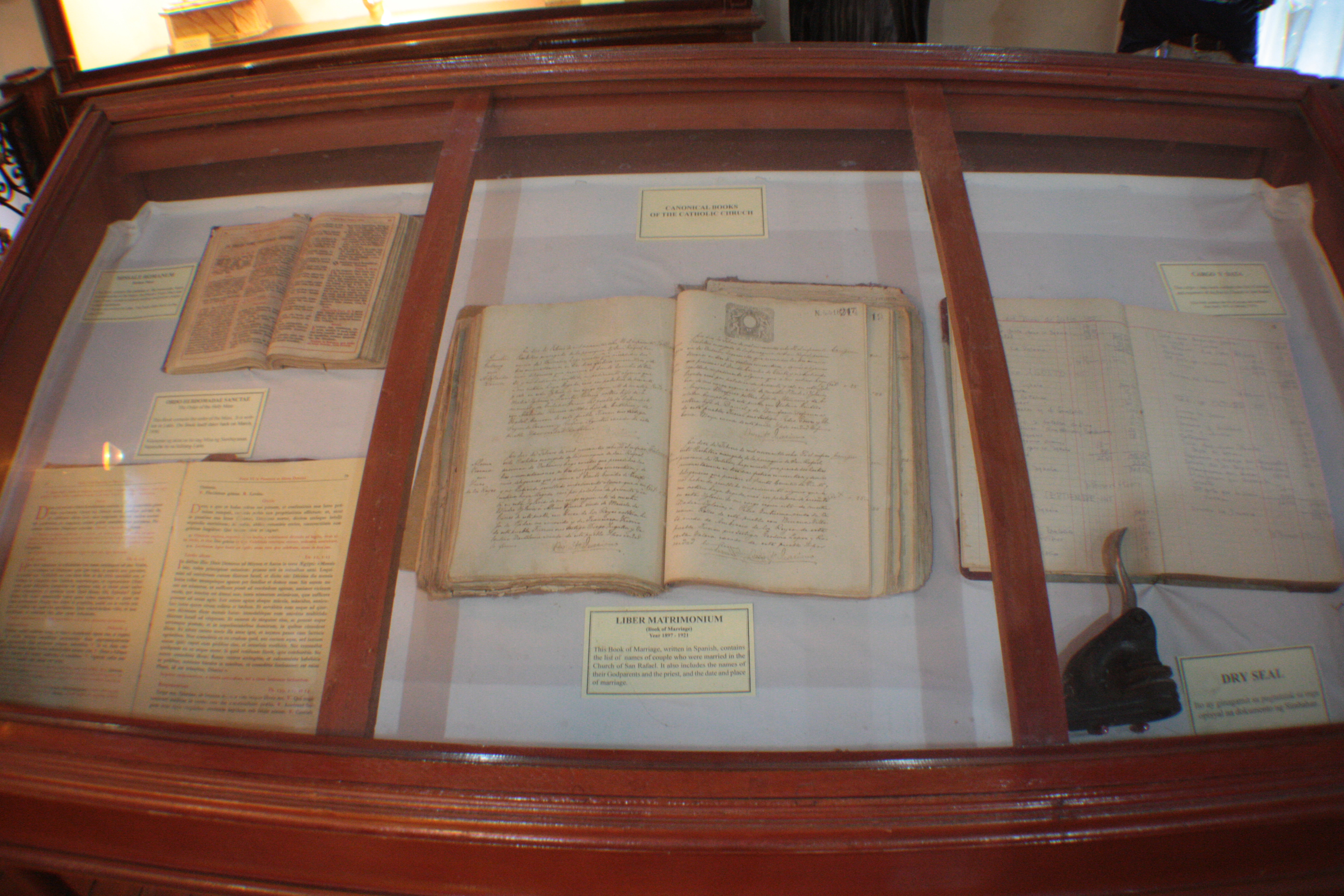
Old church records

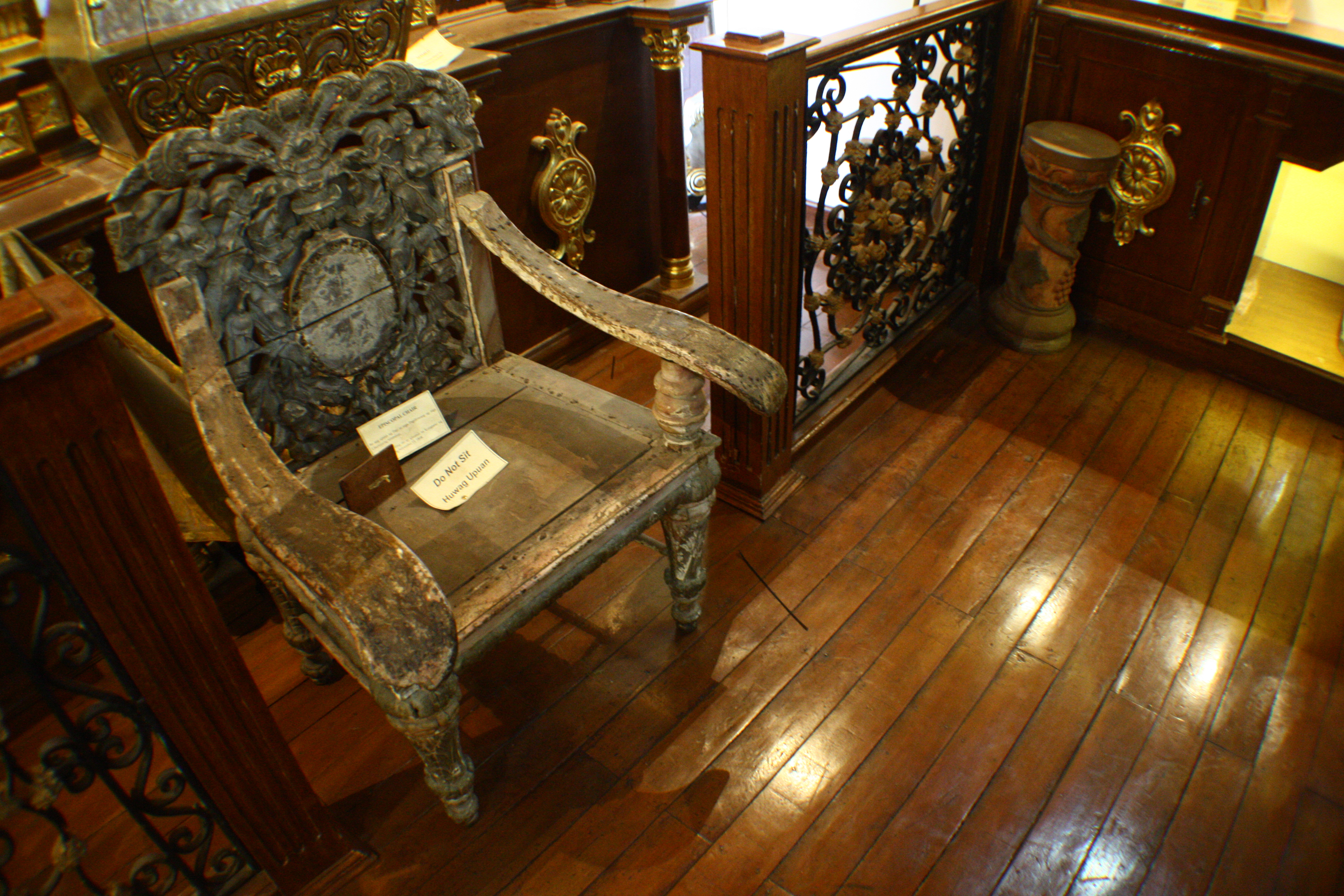
Episcopal chair

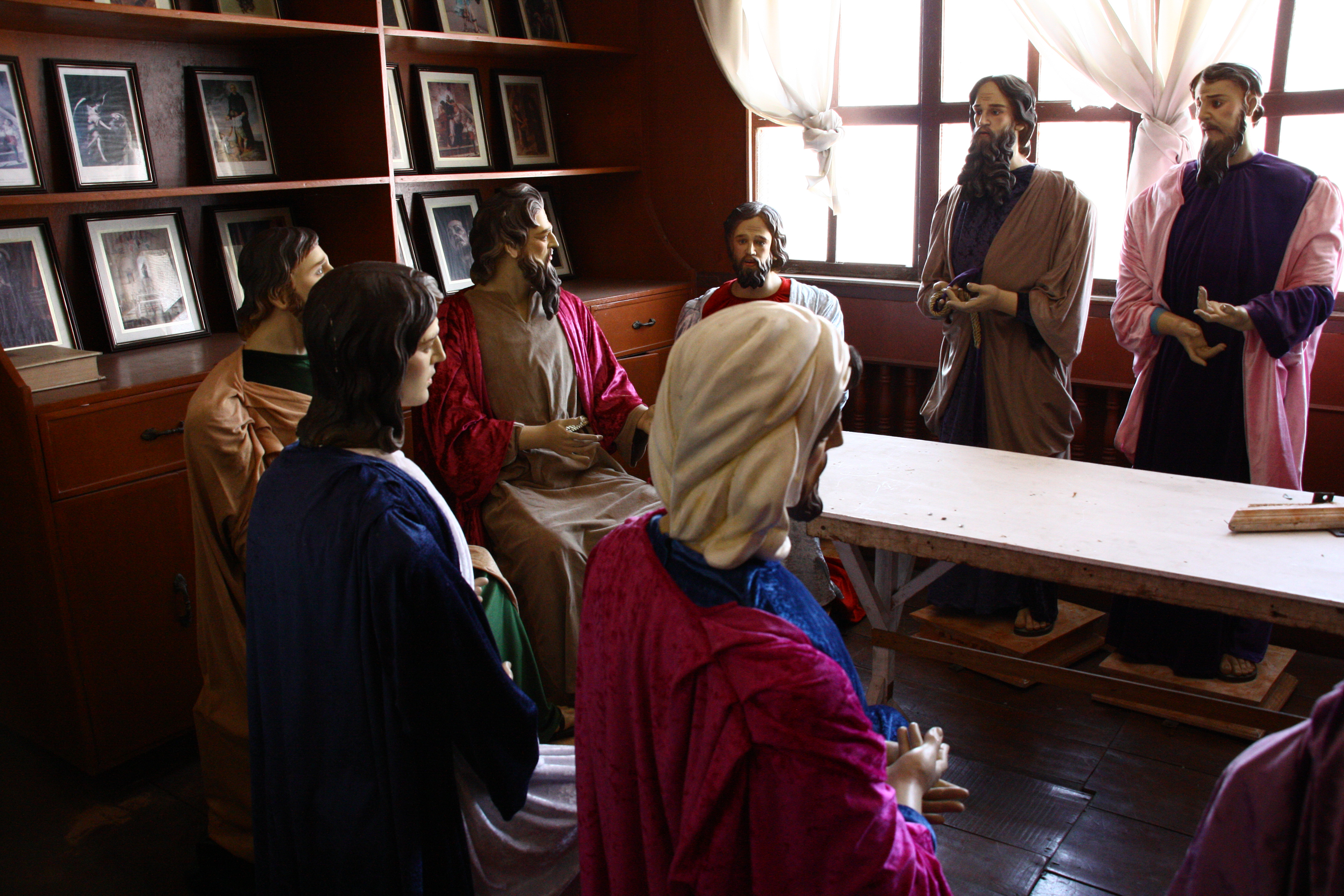
Life size images of the Last Supper

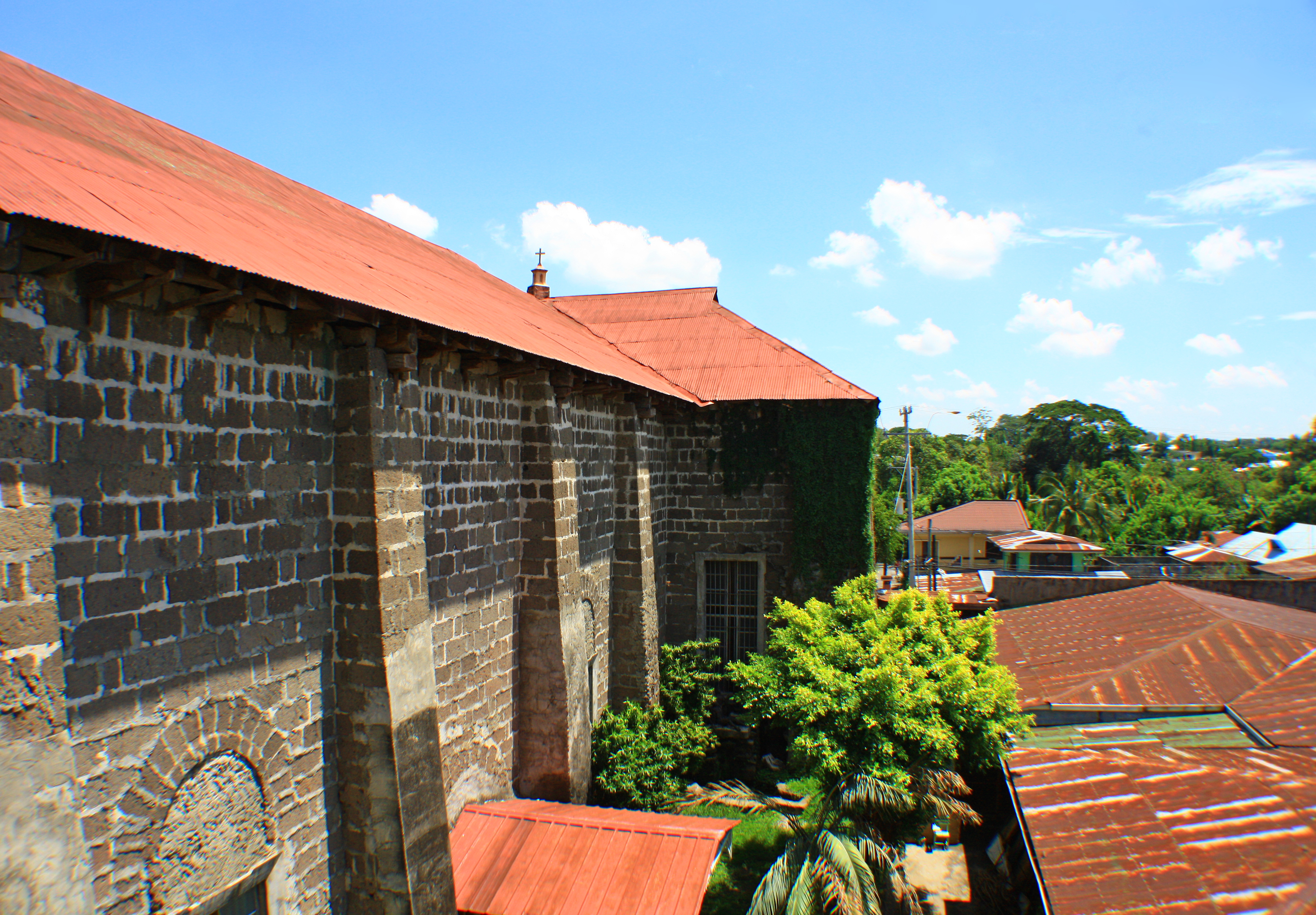
Side of the Church viewed from the belfry

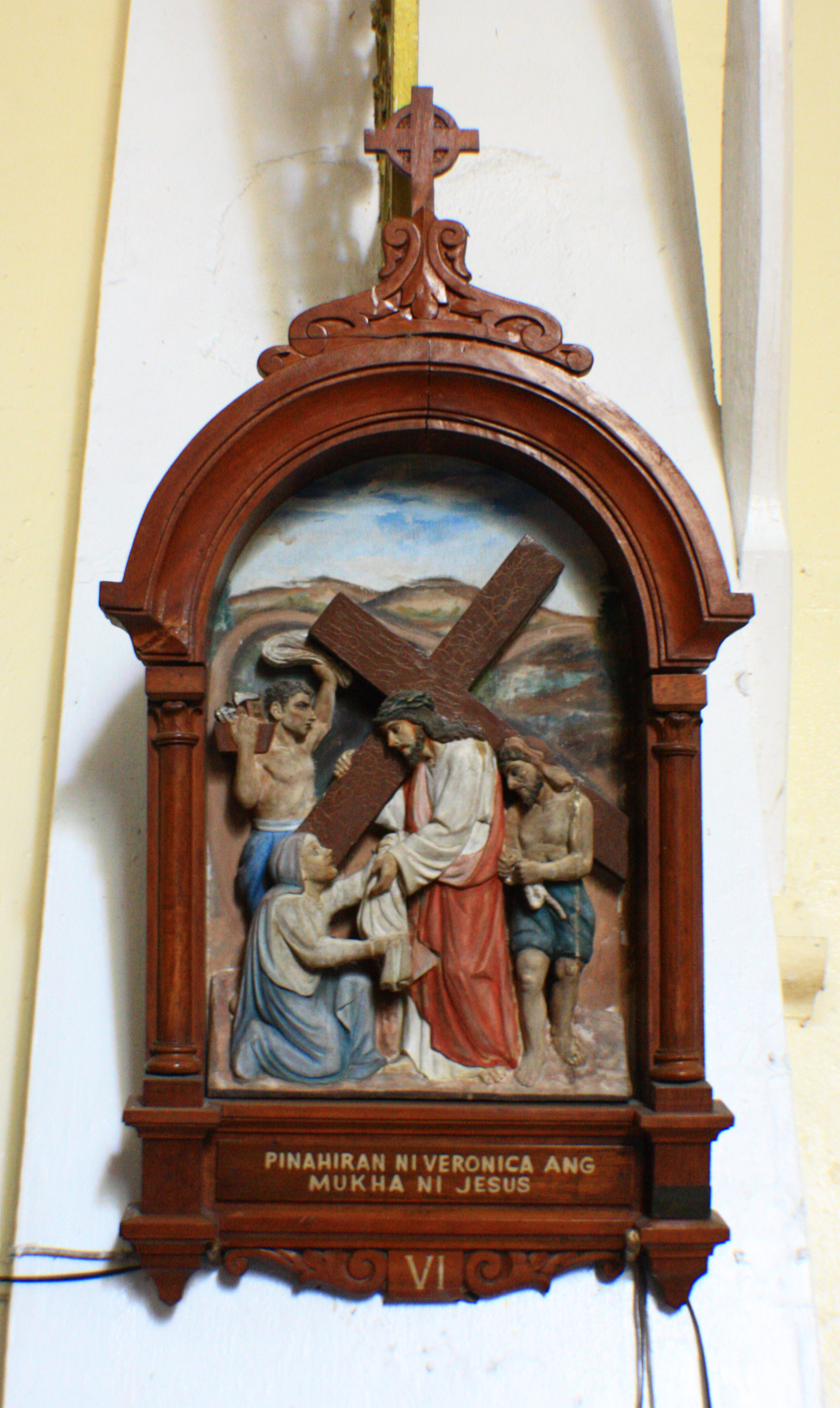
Details of one of the Stations of the Cross reliefs

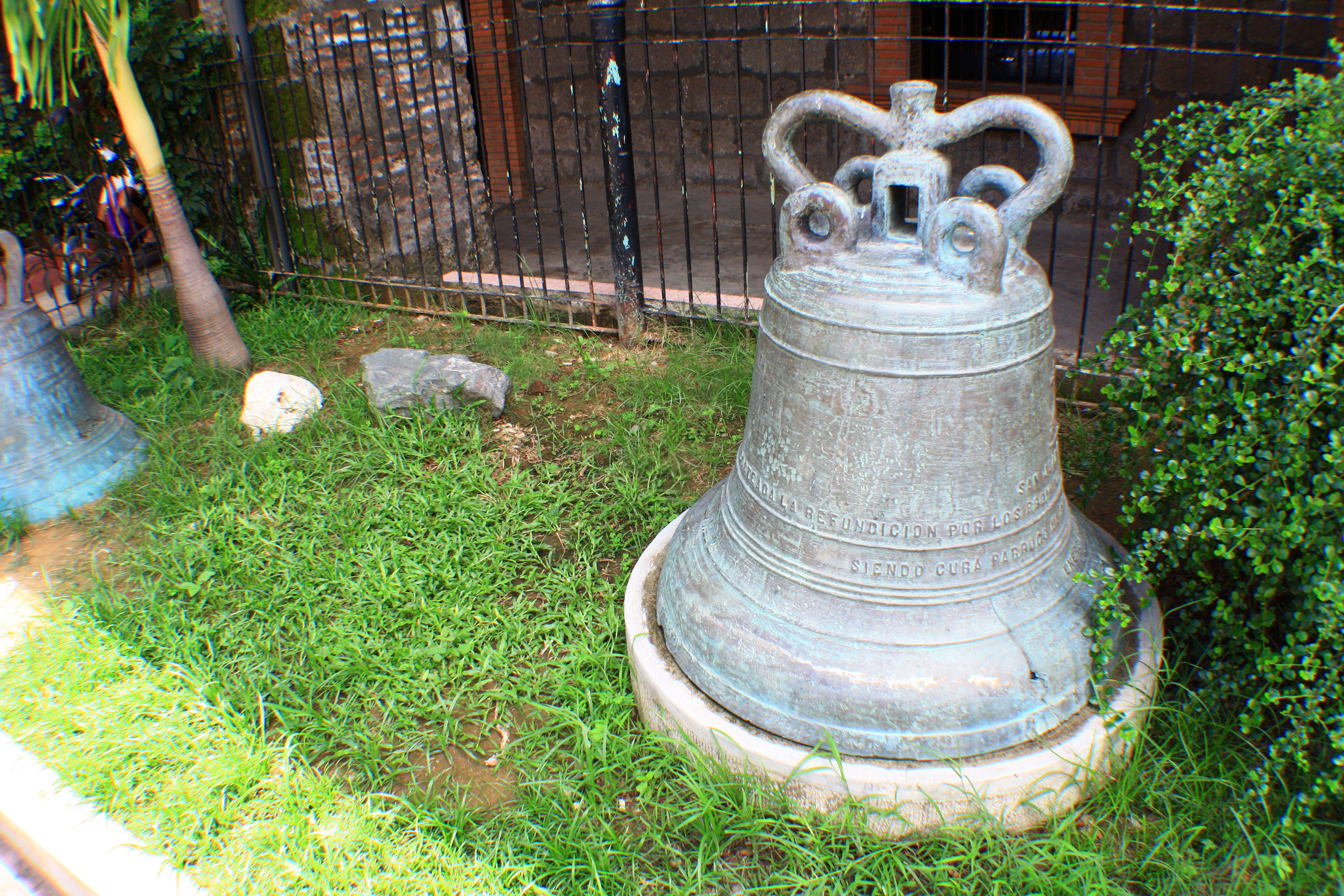
Campana Mayor now located on the church patio

== Bibliography ==
- Bulacan: Lalawigan ng bayani at bulaklak. (2002). Almario, V. S. [ed.]. Pamanang Bulacan Foundation, Inc. ISBN 971-92469-0-1.
- Cabigas, E. (2008) Visita iglesia: The old churches of bulacan (part 2 of 2). Retrieved from http://simbahan.net/2008/03/17/visita-iglesia-the-old-churches-of-bulacan-part-2-of-2/
- Galende, P. (1996). Angels in stone: Architecture of augustinian churches in the philippines. ISBN 978-9719157106.
- Official Website of the Municipal Government of San Rafael. Retrieved from http://sanrafael.gov.ph
- Official Website of the Provincial Government of Bulacan. Retrieved from http://bulacan.gov.ph
- Taruc, J. (2014). Ang simbahan ng san rafael: An I witness documentary. Retrieved from http://www.gmanetwork.com/news/story/360871/publicaffairs/iwitness/ang-simbahan-ng-san-rafael-an-i-witness-documentary-by-jay-taruc
- Zamora, F. (2007). Sisa, crispin, basilio lived here, say bulacan townsfolk. Philippine Daily Inquirer. Retrieved from http://newsinfo.inquirer.net/inquirerheadlines/nation/view/20071230-109474/Sisa_Crispin_Basilio_lived_here_say_Bulacan_townsfolk
