= San Rafael, Bulacan =

Municipality in Bulacan, Philippines

San Rafael
- Municipality
- Municipality of San Rafael
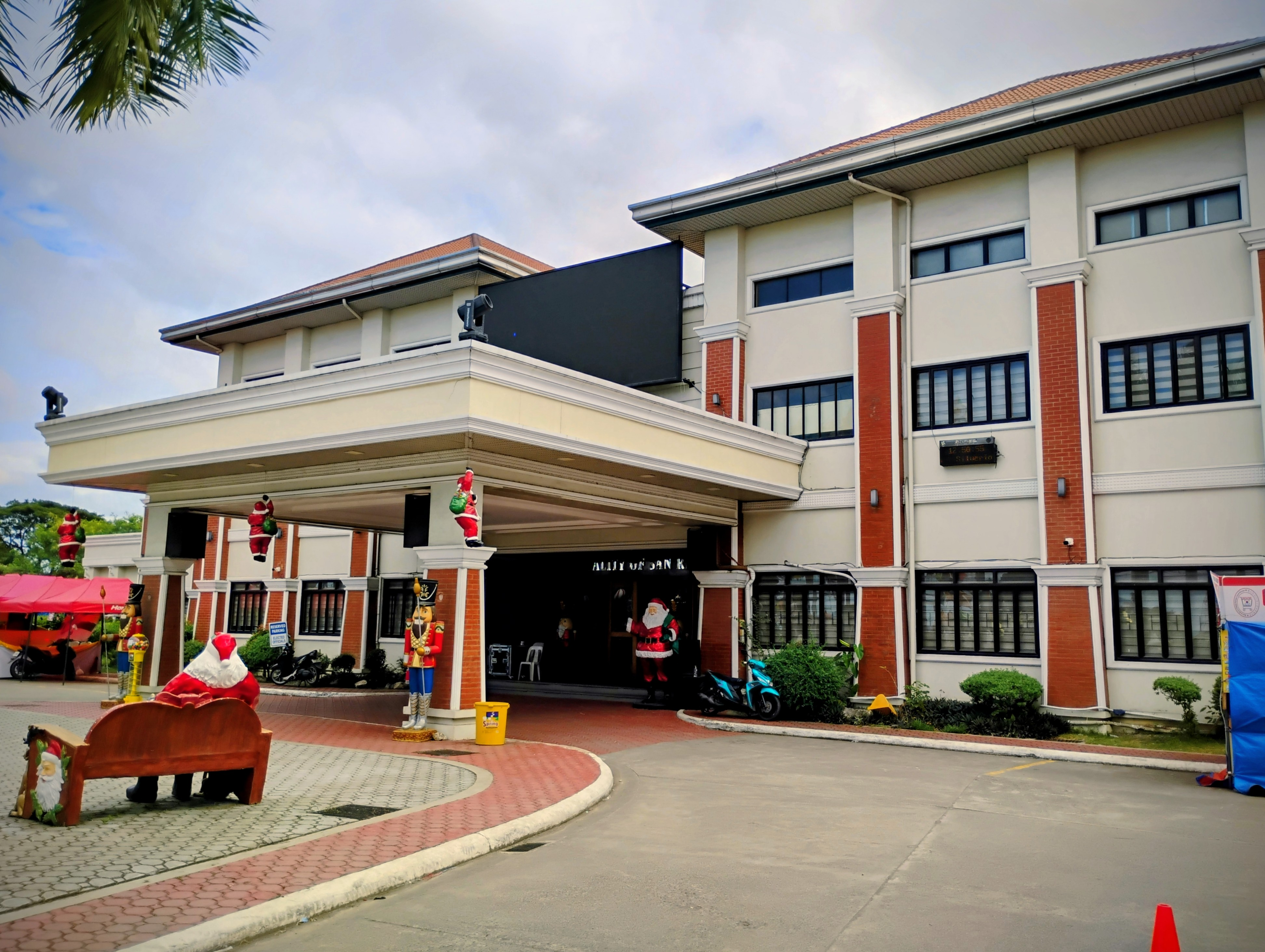
- Municipal Hall

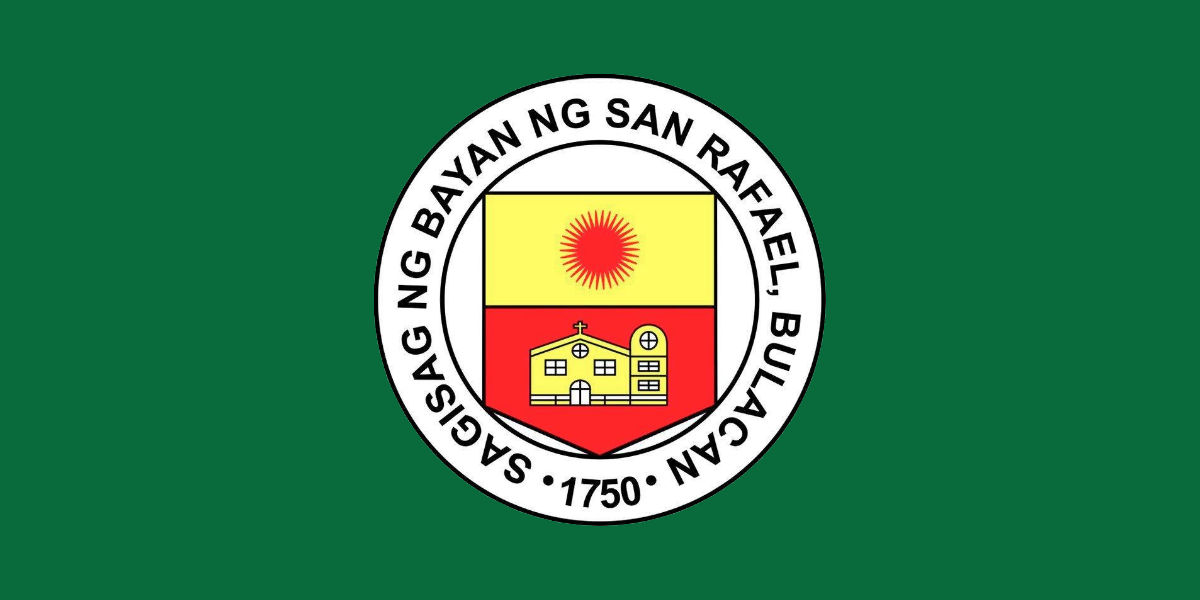
- Flag Seal

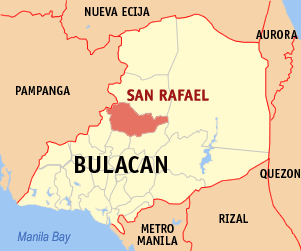
- Map of Bulacan with San Rafael highlighted
- Interactive map of San Rafael
- Location within the Philippines
- Coordinates: 14°57′N 120°58′E
- Country: Philippines
- Region: Central Luzon
- Province: Bulacan
- District: 3rd district
- Founded: September 29, 1750
- Annexation to Baliuag: October 8, 1903
- Chartered: March 21, 1907
- Barangays: 34 (see Barangays)

Government
  - Type: Sangguniang Bayan
  - Mayor: Cipriano "Goto" Violago(PFP)
  - Vice Mayor: Edison M. Veneracion (PFP)
  - Representative: Mark Cholo I. Violago (Lakas)
  - Municipal Council: Members: Joel M. Veneracion; Gerardo C. Torres; Jaime I. Viceo V; Apriliza C. Sta. Maria; Edlin M. Indon; Nestor V. Vicho; Anna Maria S. Santos; Francisco G. Viola Jr.
  - Electorate: 68,248 voters (2025)

Area
  - Total: 152.43 km^{2} (58.85 sq mi)
- Elevation: 23 m (75 ft)
- Highest elevation: 69 m (226 ft)
- Lowest elevation: 8 m (26 ft)

Population (2024 census)
  - Total: 108,256
  - Density: 710.20/km^{2} (1,839.4/sq mi)
  - Households: 25,220

Economy
  - Income class: 1st municipal income class
  - Poverty incidence: 10.87% (2023)
  - Revenue: ₱ 546 million (2024)
  - Assets: ₱ 1,568 million (2024)
  - Expenditure: ₱ 416.3 million (2024)
  - Liabilities: ₱ 250.6 million (2024)

Utilities
  - Electricity: Meralco
- Time zone: UTC+8 (PST)
- ZIP code: 3008, 3025 (Cruz Na Daan)
- PSGC: 0301422000
- IDD : area code: +63 (0)44
- Native languages: Tagalog
- Website: www.sanrafael.gov.ph

San Rafael, officially the Municipality of San Rafael (Tagalog: Bayan ng San Rafael, Kapampangan: Balen ning San Rafael), is a municipality in the province of Bulacan, Philippines. According to the 2024 census, it has a population of 108,256 people.

== Etymology ==
According to legend, the origin of town's present name San Rafael traces to a local fisherman. A few days after he had dreamed that he could heal, he successfully treated an ill neighbor using a fish's liver. Because of this, the news spread that he was indeed able to heal. When the Spanish missionaries arrived, they visited his house that was flocked by many people. Because of this, they named the place after Saint Raphael the Archangel, the patron saint of healing whose name is in turn derived from a Hebrew word meaning "God has healed."

== History ==
=== Spanish era ===
San Rafael was established as a pueblo in 1750. During the Philippine Revolution in 1896 San Juan de Dios Church was used as military barracks for almost three days, after the insurgents had destroyed all papers and documents they found in the convent. When the Spanish Cazadores learned of these rebellious activities, they entered the church and fought the insurgents. The combatants fought heavily inside the church to a point that blood was spilled all over the church floor. The patio in front of the church was littered by dead bodies of Filipino insurgents. The gobernadorcillo ordered people to dig a common grave near the church for the bodies of the insurgents. The 1818 Spanish census recorded the area having 1,650 native families and 10 Spanish-Filipino families.

=== American influence ===
The Americans succeeded the Spaniards with their policy of benevolent assimilation. Schools were established as a potent factor for pacification. In 1903, schools were opened in San Rafael. The municipal building was used as a school house.

In 1899, the Americans incorporated the town to Baliuag when the latter was intended to be the new provincial capital of Bulacan. However, due to a number of petitions of the people of San Rafael, especially when the plan to make Baliuag the capital of Bulacan did not materialize, the Americans where convinced to separate San Rafael as an independent town from Baliwag. Julian V. Valte was appointed to be the first Presidente Municipal of San Rafael, and Emilio Reyes was the last. However, its incorporation to Baliuag pushed through, alongside Bustos, on October 8, 1903, by virtue of Act No. 932. It was separated from Baliuag to become an independent town once again on March 21, 1907.

In 1924 and 1927, with the help of some influential men, the Spaniards were able to get the signatures of the land owners of San Rafael and San Ildefonso to an agreement purporting to show their willingness to donate their lands to the Hospital of San Juan de Dios.

Thus the town of San Rafael and San Ildefonso became properties of the hospital and started to be called Hacienda de Buenavista until 1944, when it got back its original name.

=== Japanese occupation ===
Socio–economic, educational and religious programs were largely non-existent. The people were deprived of property, food, supplies and shelter. They were forced or resorted to eat camote, wore jute sacks and tattered clothes. The people of San Rafael evacuated to Upig, Licheria, Coral na Bato and Camachile. Schools were closed and the church was ordered to stop performing its religious duties.

Guerrilla resistance against the Japanese continued throughout the war. Uncaptured Filipino army units, a communist insurgency and supporting American agents all played a role in the resistance. The people of San Rafael refused to be subjected to Japanese authority and they organized and joined small guerrilla bands and harassed the units of the Japanese army stationed in the town whenever there was a chance to do so. These small, organized guerrillas in San Rafael later became members of BMA (Bulacan Military Area).

=== The liberation of San Rafael ===
When the American forces landed in Leyte in October 1944, the Japanese became more brutal. One incident occurred at Barrio Pulo. Men and women who were assembled where tied together, dynamites were strapped to many of them and these were later detonated by the Japanese captors. A lone survivor, Marcelo Mangahas, escaped. Other atrocities followed. However, the people of San Rafael and the Filipino soldiers and guerrillas prevented further casualties and destruction. When the Americans arrived, they found San Rafael liberated by the guerrillas with the Filipino troops of the Philippine Commonwealth Army 32nd, 35th and 36th Infantry Division and the Philippine Constabulary 3rd Constabulary Regiment that were mostly from San Rafael.

Soldiers of the 32nd, 35th and 36th Infantry Division of the Philippine Commonwealth Army and 3rd Constabulary Regiment of the Philippine Constabulary liberated San Rafael and aided the guerrillas of the Bulacan Military Area (BMA) and defeated Japanese soldiers and aftermath in World War II.

=== Martial Law Era and the Bulacan Martyrs ===
San Rafael was one of the places in Bulacan who experienced rural repression during the Martial law era under Marcos dictatorship back in the late 1970s and 1980s. The most notable historical event revolving around Martial law in San Rafael was the 1982 killing of five youth activists whose bodies were dumped in the municipality. Their names were Danilo M. Aguirre, Edwin G. Borlongan, Teresita E. Llorente, Renato T. Manimbo, and Constantino R. Medina who were also known as the Bulacan Martyrs.

On June 21, 1982 the group was meeting at a farmer's house in Pulilan when a group of soldiers came to detain them. On the morning of July 22, bullet-riddled bodies were left at a corner of the San Rafael municipality hall. The municipal hall employees there donated temporary caskets and buried the victims initially at the local cemetery the same day. Furthermore, the Philippine Constabulary (PC) said it was the aftermath of an armed encounter. However, documentation from the July 9, 1982 factsheet of the Task Force Detainees of the Philippines gave an account that the meeting had six organizers. Moreover, one of the six was able to hide and survive, eventually reporting to the victim's families that they were taken alive.

Because of this, the families sought for exhumation of the bodies with assistance from the Church-Military Liaison Committee (CMLC) led by Fr. Cirilo Almario, Jr. and Rev. Edgardo "Ed" Villacorte who is a member. On June 26, the bodies of Edwin Borlongan and Renato Manimbo were retrieved following negotiations and payment fees demanded by authorities. However, the three remaining victims were buried in the San Rafael Municipal Cemetery.

To secure the exhumation, a meeting with the constabulary was held on July 1, 1982, the PC Company Provincial Commander and Bulacan Police Superintendent Maximo Mejia and commanding officer Maj. Hermogenes asserted that the encounter was between the government military troops and terrorists. The families still requested authorization for exhumation and were required to sign a waiver forfeiting the rights to an official medical autopsy before granting permission to exhume the buried corpses.

The exhumation happened late in the evening of July 1, the bodies showed severe physical trauma, gunshot wounds, bruising, and skull fractures that contradicted the open combat encounter. The remains were transferred to Barasoain Church in Malolos for public mourning. To date, further information about the perpetrators behind the killings have not been known or investigated.

=== Contemporary history ===
On December 14, 2024, the municipality set a Guinness World Record for the "largest gathering of people dressed as angels," which was previously held by Winnipeg, Canada, in 2015. Reportedly, there were more than 2,000 participants in the event which was held at the Victory Coliseum.

== Geography ==
With the continuous expansion of Metro Manila, San Rafael is part of Manila's built-up area which reaches San Ildefonso, Bulacan at its northernmost part.

San Rafael is 37 kilometres (23 mi) from Malolos, the provincial capital, 60 kilometres (37 mi) from Manila, the country's capital, and 9 kilometres (5.6 mi) from Baliwag.

=== Barangays ===
San Rafael is politically subdivided into 34 barangays, as shown in the matrix below. Each barangay consists of 7 puroks and some have sitios.

There are 5 urban and 29 rural barangays.

PSGC	Barangay	Population			±% p.a.	
		2024		2010		
031422001	BMA‑Balagtas	1.4%	1,515	1,512	▴	0.01%
031422002	Banca‑banca	1.1%	1,174	1,122	▴	0.31%
031422003	Caingin	9.5%	10,262	9,723	▴	0.37%
031422004	Coral na Bato	1.4%	1,500	1,808	▾	−1.28%
031422005	Cruz na Daan	1.3%	1,372	1,255	▴	0.62%
031422006	Dagat‑dagatan	1.2%	1,347	1,307	▴	0.21%
031422007	Diliman I	3.1%	3,340	3,333	▴	0.01%
031422008	Diliman II	0.8%	850	773	▴	0.66%
031422009	Capihan	5.9%	6,423	5,083	▴	1.62%
031422010	Libis	2.1%	2,228	2,077	▴	0.48%
031422011	Lico	1.9%	2,023	1,941	▴	0.29%
031422012	Maasim	1.2%	1,346	1,302	▴	0.23%
031422013	Mabalas‑balas	3.4%	3,667	3,196	▴	0.95%
031422014	Maguinao	3.8%	4,123	3,659	▴	0.83%
031422015	Maronquillo	3.0%	3,284	2,514	▴	1.86%
031422016	Paco	1.0%	1,101	926	▴	1.20%
031422017	Pansumaloc	0.9%	997	873	▴	0.92%
031422018	Pantubig	3.5%	3,750	3,508	▴	0.46%
031422019	Pasong Bangkal	0.9%	955	717	▴	1.99%
031422020	Pasong Callos	0.8%	818	738	▴	0.71%
031422021	Pasong Intsik	1.3%	1,459	1,317	▴	0.71%
031422022	Pinacpinacan	1.7%	1,815	1,538	▴	1.15%
031422023	Poblacion	1.5%	1,636	1,678	▾	−0.17%
031422024	Pulo	3.2%	3,488	3,470	▴	0.04%
031422025	Pulong Bayabas	1.0%	1,071	926	▴	1.01%
031422026	Salapungan	1.9%	2,058	1,895	▴	0.57%
031422027	Sampaloc	3.7%	4,009	3,693	▴	0.57%
031422028	San Agustin	1.4%	1,486	1,290	▴	0.98%
031422030	San Roque	7.6%	8,233	6,494	▴	1.65%
031422031	Talacsan	3.4%	3,659	3,638	▴	0.04%
031422032	Tambubong	7.2%	7,810	7,432	▴	0.34%
031422033	Tukod	2.2%	2,381	2,262	▴	0.35%
031422034	Ulingao	2.5%	2,653	2,198	▴	1.30%
031422035	Sapang Pahalang	0.8%	822	723	▴	0.89%
	Total		108,256	85,921	▴	1.60%

=== Climate ===
Climate data for San Rafael, Bulacan
Month	Jan	Feb	Mar	Apr	May	Jun	Jul	Aug	Sep	Oct	Nov	Dec	Year
Mean daily maximum °C (°F)	28 (82)	29 (84)	31 (88)	33 (91)	32 (90)	31 (88)	30 (86)	29 (84)	29 (84)	30 (86)	30 (86)	28 (82)	30 (86)
Mean daily minimum °C (°F)	20 (68)	20 (68)	21 (70)	22 (72)	24 (75)	24 (75)	24 (75)	24 (75)	24 (75)	23 (73)	22 (72)	21 (70)	22 (72)
Average precipitation mm (inches)	6 (0.2)	4 (0.2)	6 (0.2)	17 (0.7)	82 (3.2)	122 (4.8)	151 (5.9)	123 (4.8)	124 (4.9)	99 (3.9)	37 (1.5)	21 (0.8)	792 (31.1)
Average rainy days	3.3	2.5	11.7	6.6	17.7	22.2	25.2	23.7	23.2	17.9	9.2	5.2	168.4
Source: Meteoblue

== Demographics ==
Population census of San Rafael
Year	Pop.	±% p.a.
1903	6,682	—
1918	8,537	+1.65%
1939	12,269	+1.74%
1948	14,632	+1.98%
1960	19,772	+2.54%
1970	28,039	+3.55%
1975	32,342	+2.90%
1980	36,803	+2.62%
1990	49,528	+3.01%
1995	58,387	+3.13%
2000	69,770	+3.89%
2007	85,284	+2.81%
2010	85,921	+0.27%
2015	94,655	+1.86%
2020	103,097	+1.81%
2024	108,256	+1.18%
Source: Philippine Statistics Authority

In the 2020 census, the population of San Rafael, Bulacan, was 103,097 people, with a density of 680 inhabitants per square kilometre or 1,800 inhabitants per square mile.

== Economy ==
Poverty incidence of San Rafael (%)

Source: Philippine Statistics Authority

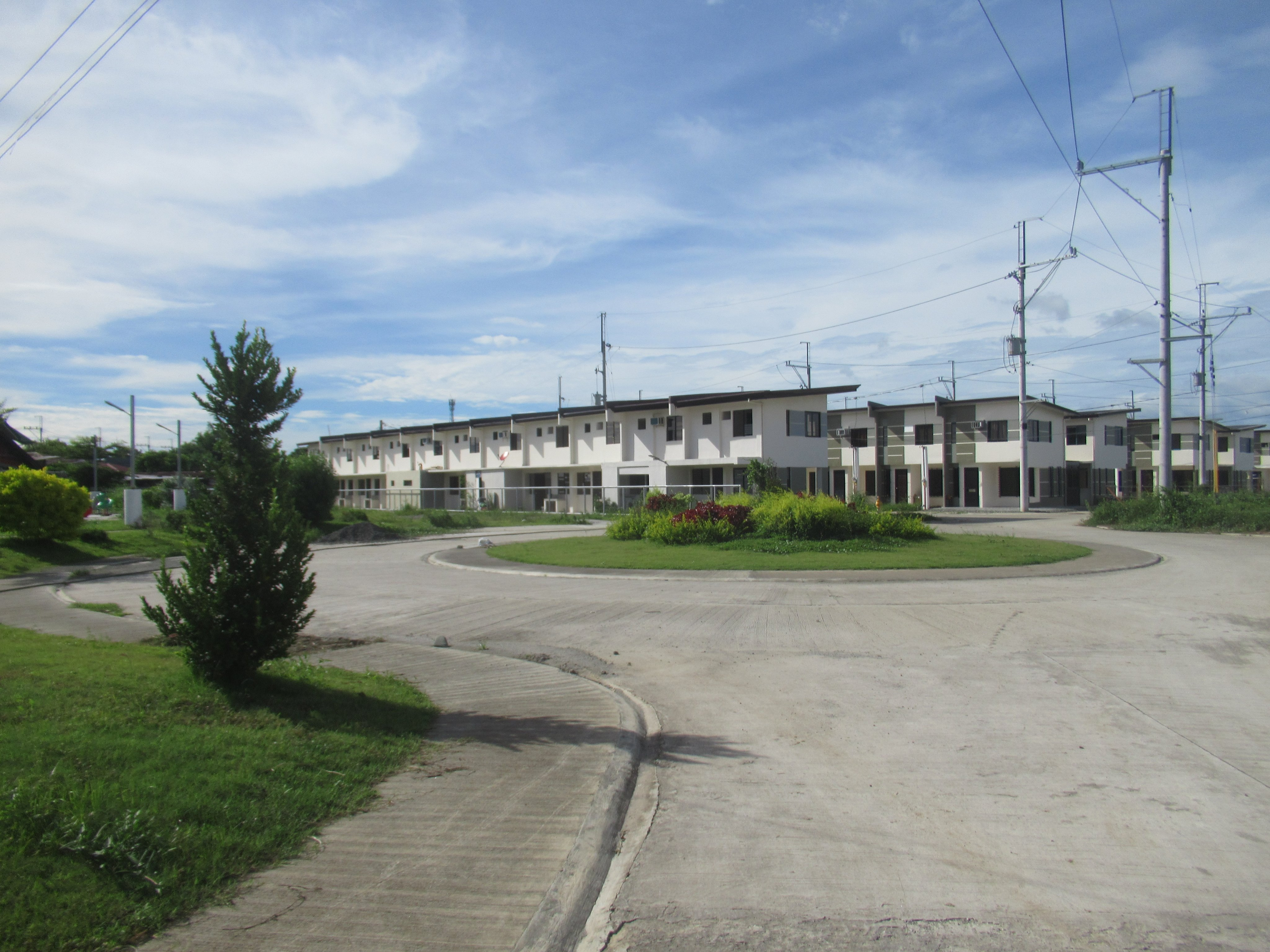
Primeworld Enclave San Rafael

== Elected Officials ==
2025-2028 San Rafael, Bulacan Officials
Position	Name	Party
Mayor	Cipriano D. Violago Jr.	PFP
Vice Mayor	Edison M. Veneracion	PFP
Councilors	Jaime I. Viceo V	PFP
Councilors	Joel M. Veneracion	PFP
Councilors	Anna Maria S. Santos	PFP
Councilors	Gerardo C. Torres	PFP
Councilors	Nestor V. Vicho	PFP
Councilors	Edlin M. Indon	PFP
Councilors	Mariano D. Sta. Maria Jr.	PFP
Councilors	Vicente N. Paulino	Independent
Ex Officio Municipal Council Members
ABC President	TBD	Nonpartisan
SK Federation President	TBD	Nonpartisan

== Infrastructure ==
=== Housing ===
In April 2023, the San Rafael Heights Township Development Project, a socialized housing innovation, based on Pambansang Pabahay Para sa Pilipino (4PH) started the construction of 3,920 residential condominium units in a seven-hectare lot in Sitio Gulod, Barangay Caingin. It is developed by First Dynabloc Construction and Development Corporation.

Primeworld Enclave San Rafael is owned by Primeworld Land Holdings Inc. It is a gated and planned community and affordable housing in Barangay Caingin. Its amenities include a clubhouse, basketball court, park and playground, garden walkway and jogging path. Primeworld Land received multiple awards as house developer - DOT Property Philippine Awards 2023, Lamudi Philippine Real Estate Awards, and PropertyGuru Philippines Property Awards 2023.

== Tourism ==
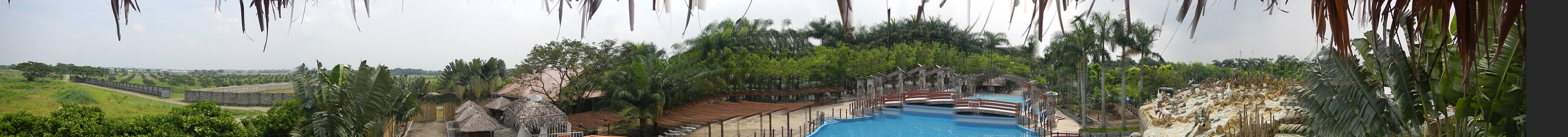
8 Waves Waterpark & Hotel, DRT Highway, Ulingao

The 8 Waves Waterpark & Hotel is the prime resort of the Town, and is one of the biggest in the Philippines. The Big Rock Farm Resort is another notable resort which is located in Barangay Coral na Bato. The Malangaan Cave and Spring, located in Barangay Tukod is a large cave untouched by quarry operations in San Rafael, and according to the locals of the barangay, it was once a hiding place of guerillas during World War II.

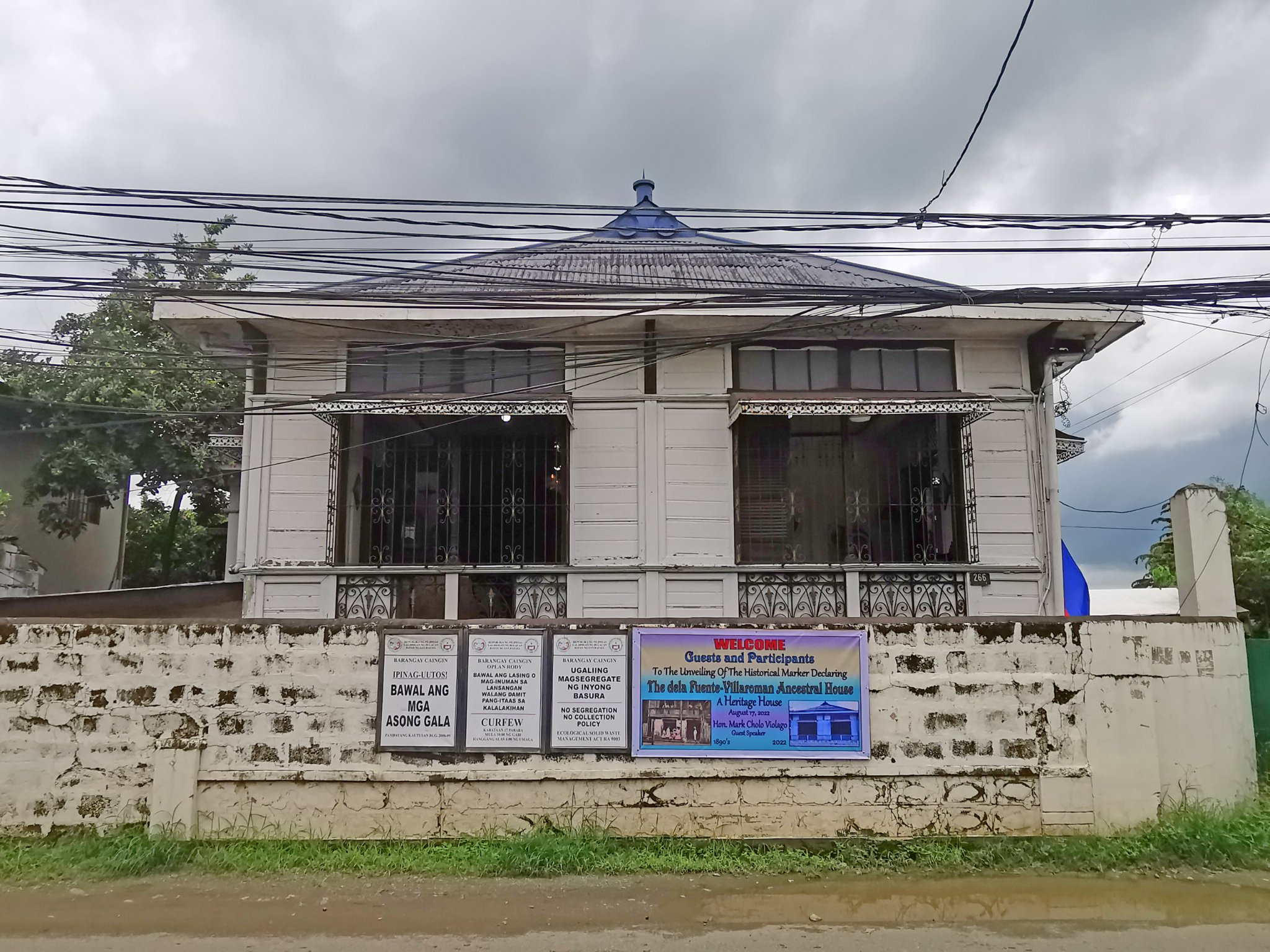
Dela Fuente-Villaroman Ancestral House

The Dela Fuente-Villaroman Ancestral House or Casa dela Fuente (Caingin) was declared a Heritage House per National Historical Commission of the Philippines Resolution No. 7, s. 2022 under RA 10066 at 10086. The historical marker was unveiled on 17 August 2022 by Carminda R. Arevalo, OIC, NHCP and San Rafael Mayor Mark Cholo Violago with G. Leween V. Castro and G. Alvin R. Alid. Barangay Caingin Resolution of June 24, 2022 declared it "Bahay na Malaki" as Heritage House by Captain Ramilito B. Capistrano and all Councilors. Built in 1890, this 19th-century architecture in the Philippines with its Azotea built in 1957, is owned by Vicente Trinidad dela Fuente (November 14, 1866 – December 16, 1920) a Cabeza de Barangay or Kapitan, husband of Paz Lim Villaroman (February 18, 1875 – March 20, 1913) with children Amanda (February 20, 1891 – January 14, 1960), Luisa, Luisa, Araceli (November 25, 1895 – April 7, 1995) and Dolores-Lolita (December 31, 1898 – April 18, 1986), all spinsters, who established the "dela Fuente Lines". Their cousins Leticia Trinidad Gonzales and Dalisay Lim Cruz, teacher, built the Caingin chapel.

=== Largest Gathering of People Dressed as Angels ===
In 2024, Mayor Mark Cholo Violago conceptualized the “Largest Gathering of People Dressed as Angels”, a verified Guinness World Records, as tribute to the Seven Archangels in the town's annual September "Angel Festival" and to promote its tourism. On December 14, 2,000 residents dressed in white robes, halos, and wings at the Victory Coliseum, Town Hall.

== Festivals ==
Every year, the town celebrates its Angel Festival in honor of their 2nd patron saint, Saint Raphael, together their town's pride, the Angel Festival, which attracts many tourists every year. It is a colorful celebration in honor of the Seven Archangels. This is held every 29 September.

This is highlighted by a parade participated by children from the public and private schools in San Rafael. This is followed by an interpretative dancing competition by all participant schools. The Angel Festival was started in September 29, 2002 through the initiative of the San Juan de Dios Parish and the San Rafael Tourism Council.

== Education ==
The San Rafael Schools District Office governs all educational institutions within the municipality. It oversees the management and operations of all private and public, from primary to secondary schools.

=== Primary and elementary schools ===
- Caingin Ecumenical School
- Caingin Elementary School
- Capihan Elementary School
- Coral Na Bato Elementary School
- Dagatdagatan Elementary School
- Diliman Elementary School
- Lydia D. Villangca Elementary School
- Maguinao Elementary School
- Maronquillo Elementary School
- Montessori de San Rafael
- Paco Elementary School
- Pantubig Elementary School
- Pasong Bangkal Elementary School
- Pasong Callos Elementary School
- Pasong Inchik Elementary School
- Pinacpinacan Elementary School
- Pulo Elementary School
- Pulong Bayabas Elementary School
- Salapungan Elementary School
- Sampaloc Elementary School
- San Agustin Elementary School
- San Rafael Central School
- San Roque Elementary School
- Sanctuario of St. Maria Theresa School
- Sapang Pahalang Elementary School
- St. Luke School
- Sto. Niño Academy
- Talacsan Elementary School
- Tambubong Elementary School
- Tukod Elementary School

=== Secondary schools ===
- Carlos F. Gonzales High School
- Lydia D. Villangca Trade School
- Maronquillo National High School
- Salapungan National High School
- San Rafael National Trade School

=== Higher educational institutions ===
- Baliwag Maritime Academy
- Bulacan Polytechnic College
- Colegio de San Juan de Dios
- Erhard Science College
- Microlink Institute of Science and Technology
- St. Paul College

== Notable personalities ==
- Ruperto Santos – fourth Bishop of Balanga (April 1, 2010–July 22, 2023) and fifth Bishop of Antipolo (July 22, 2023–present).
- Zaijian Jaranilla – Filipino actor and model having primary allegiance with ABS-CBN Corporation under Star Magic and secondary allegiance conditionally with other media companies (GMA Network and TV5 Network) who is best known for his role as the orphan Santino in the 2009–2013 ABS-CBN religious-themed teleserye, May Bukas Pa. He studied senior high school and celebrated the school's 10th anniversary at the municipality's Colegio de San Juan de Dios.

== Gallery ==
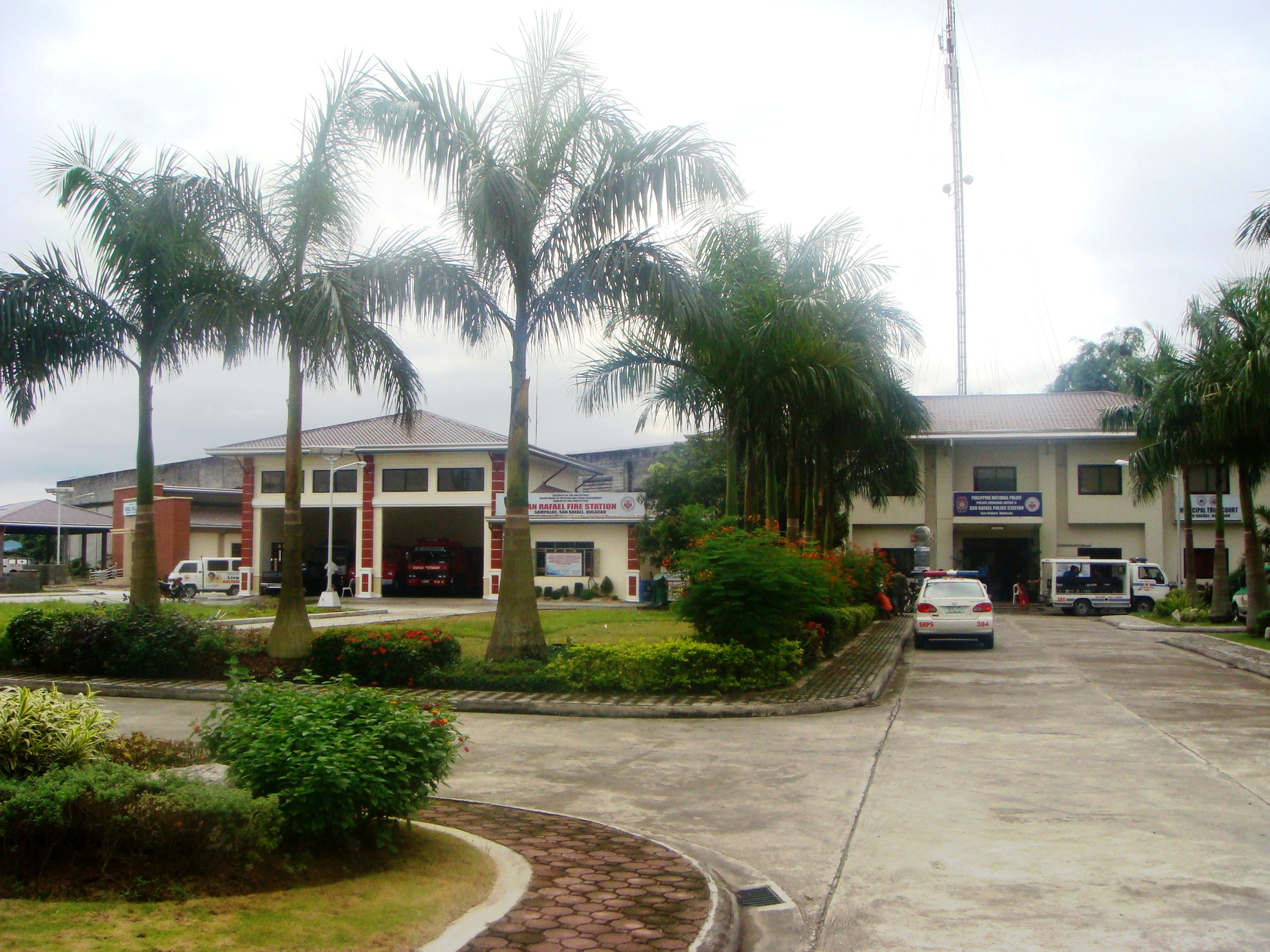
San Rafael Fire & PNP Police Stations and Municipal Trial Court, inside the New San Rafael Municipal Hall (Sampaloc)

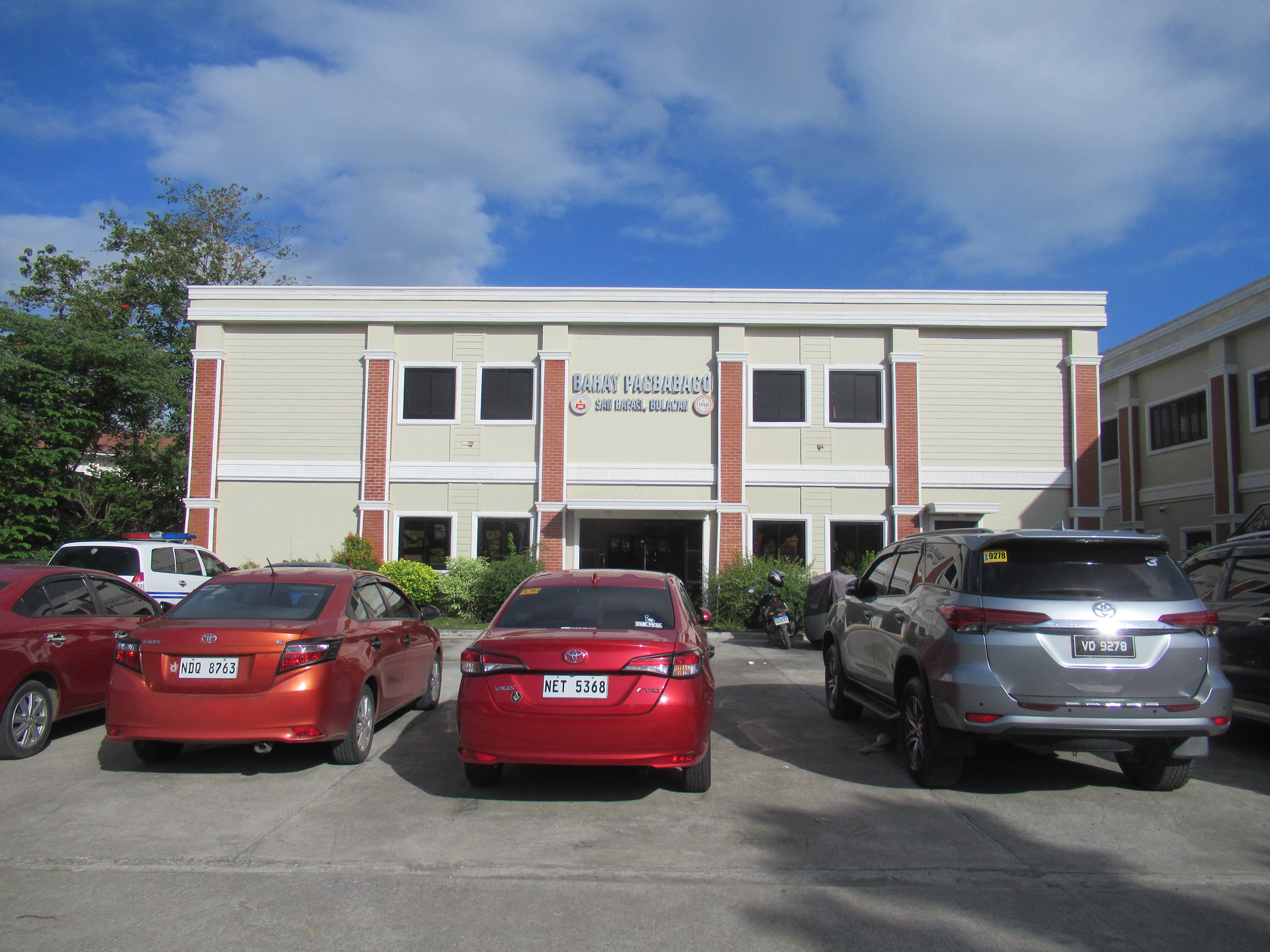
Bahay Pagbabago

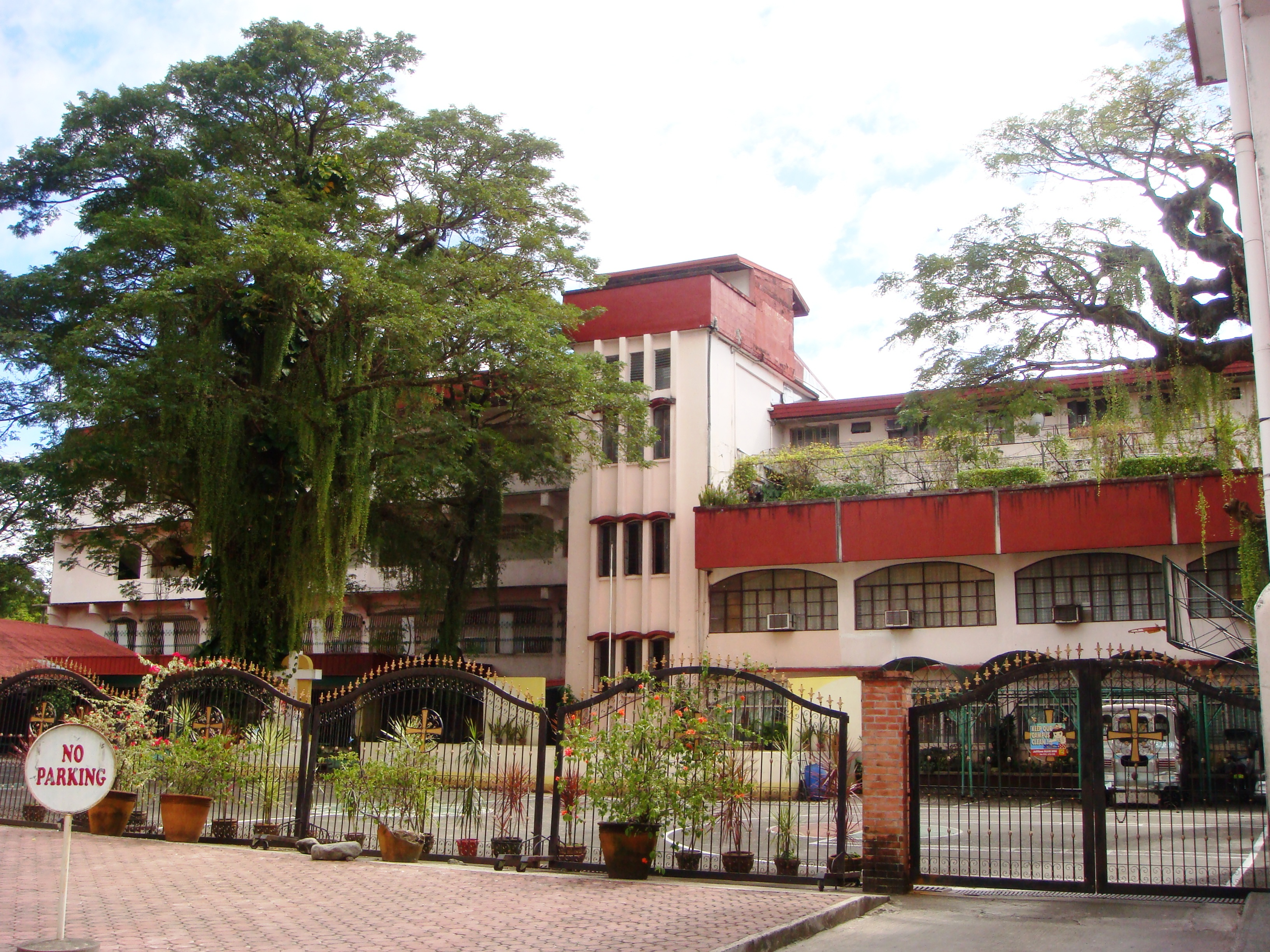
St. Paul College San Rafael (Pantubig)

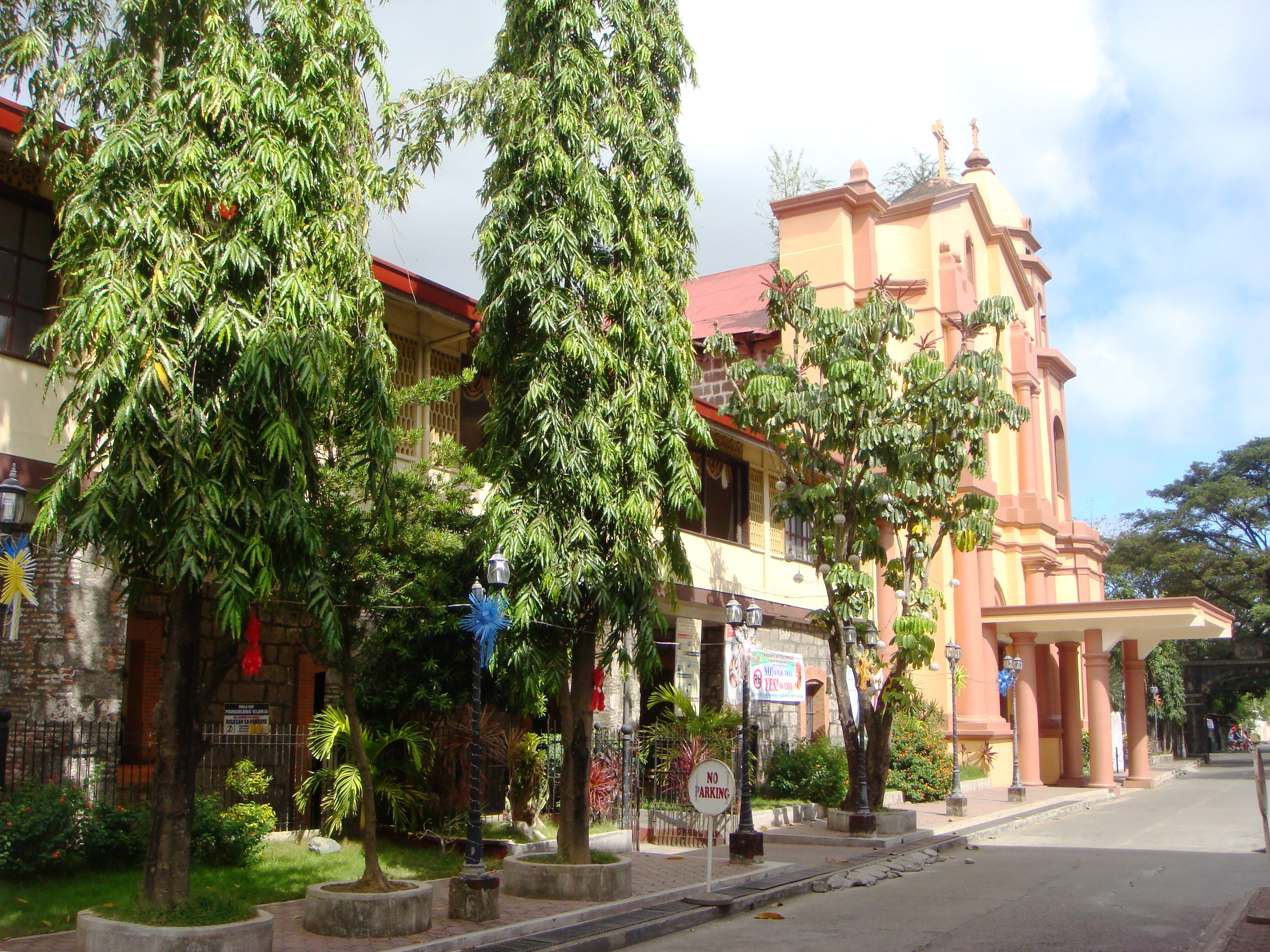
San Juan de Dios Church, a witness to the bloody 1896 Philippine Revolution (used as military barrack of Filipino insurgents for 3 days)

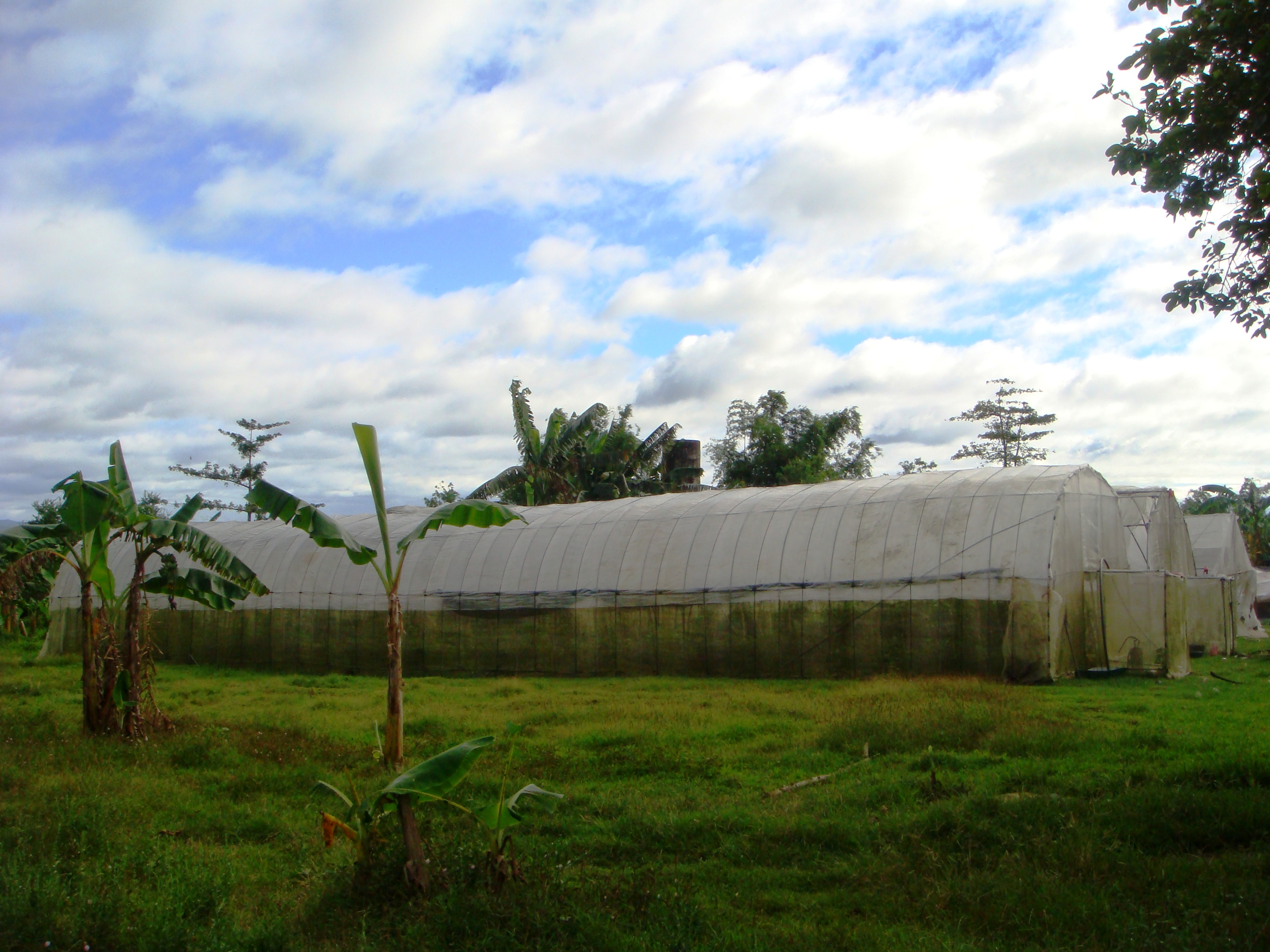
MMPCI Ecology Center (Maronquillo)

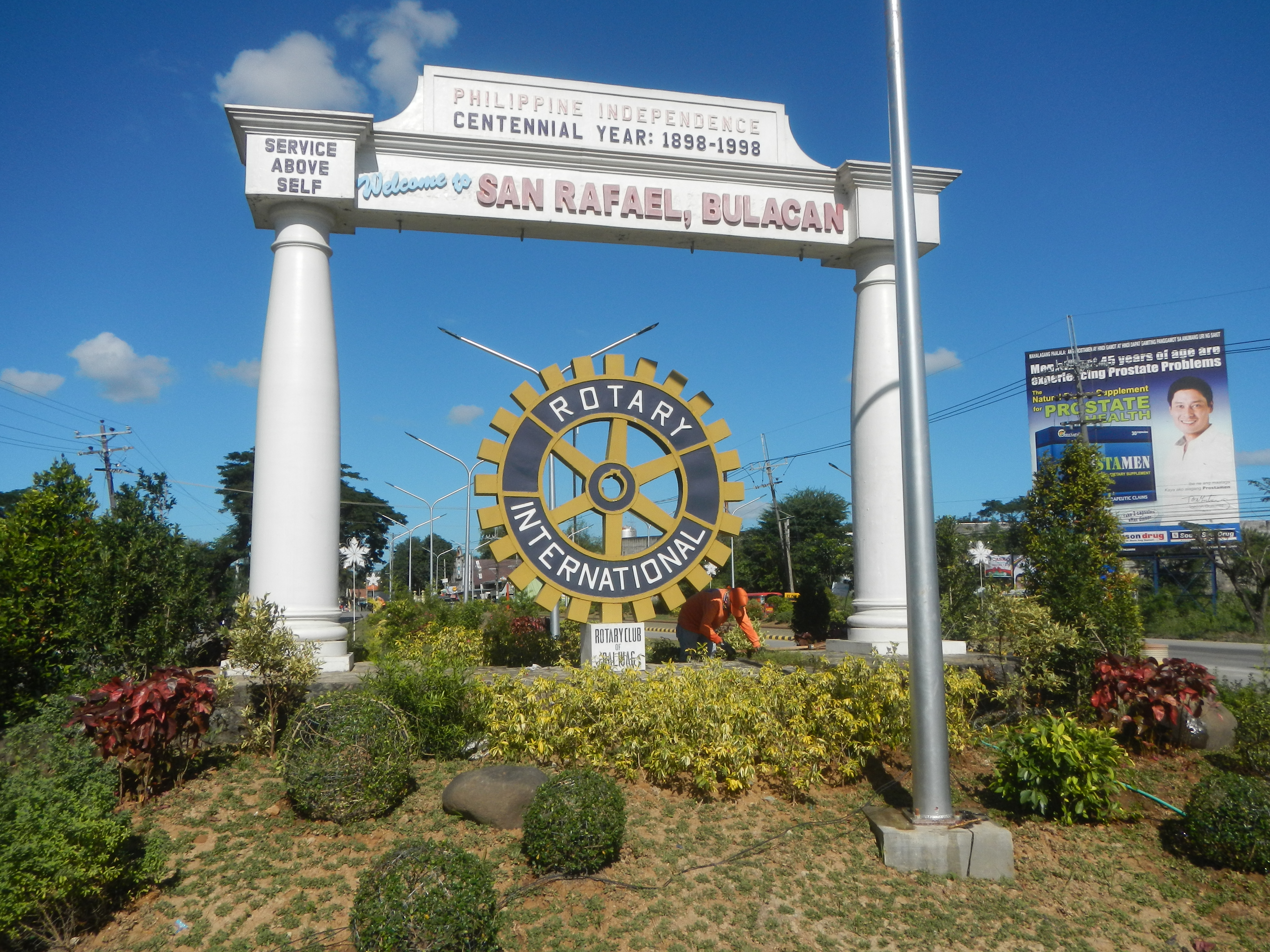
San Rafael Welcome Arch

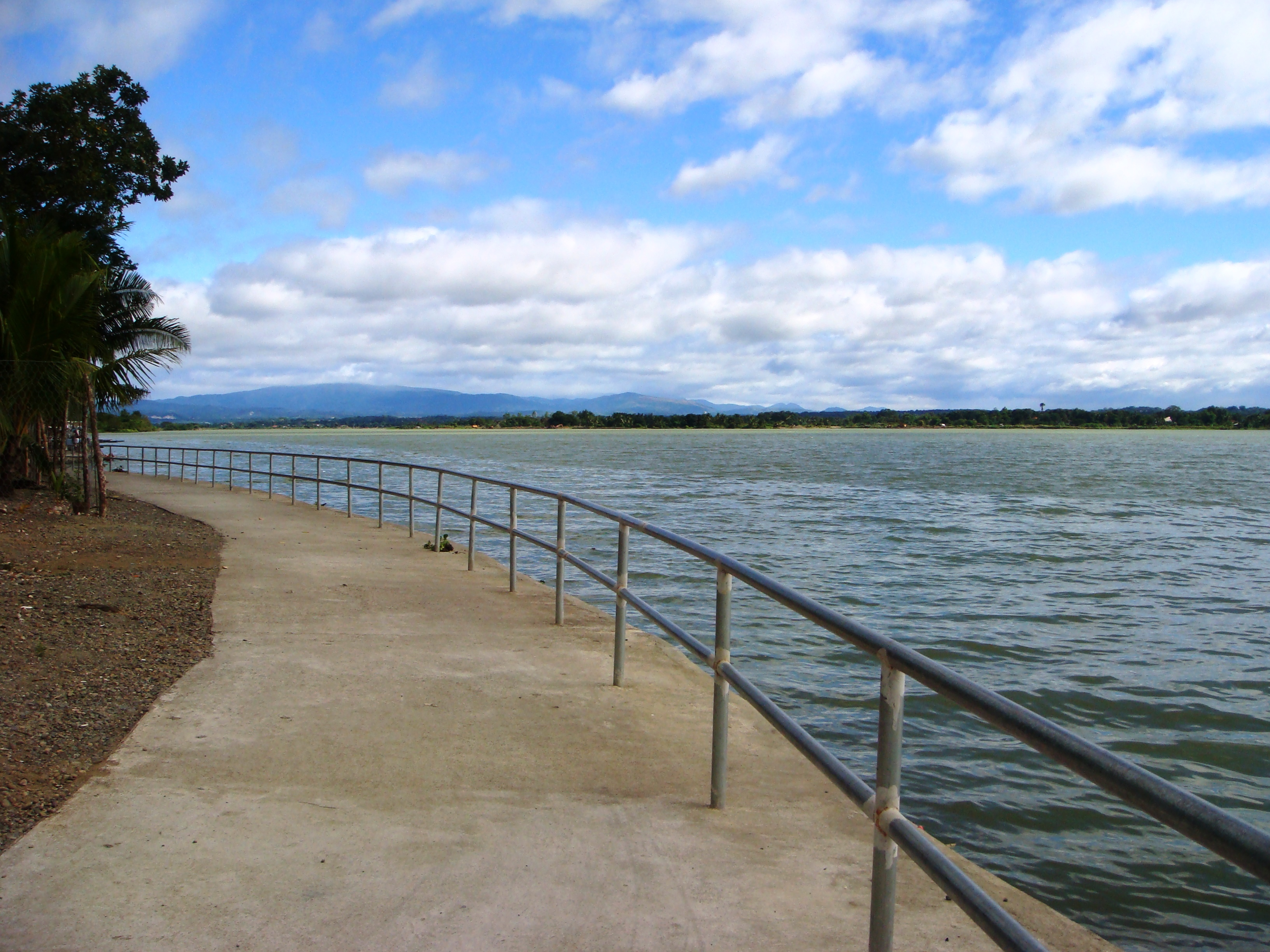
Baywalk view (Lico, San Rafael) of Angat Dam-River & Sierra Madre (Philippines)
