= Santa Monica Parish Church (Angat) =

Roman Catholic church in Bulacan, Philippines

Angat Church
- Santa Monica Parish Church
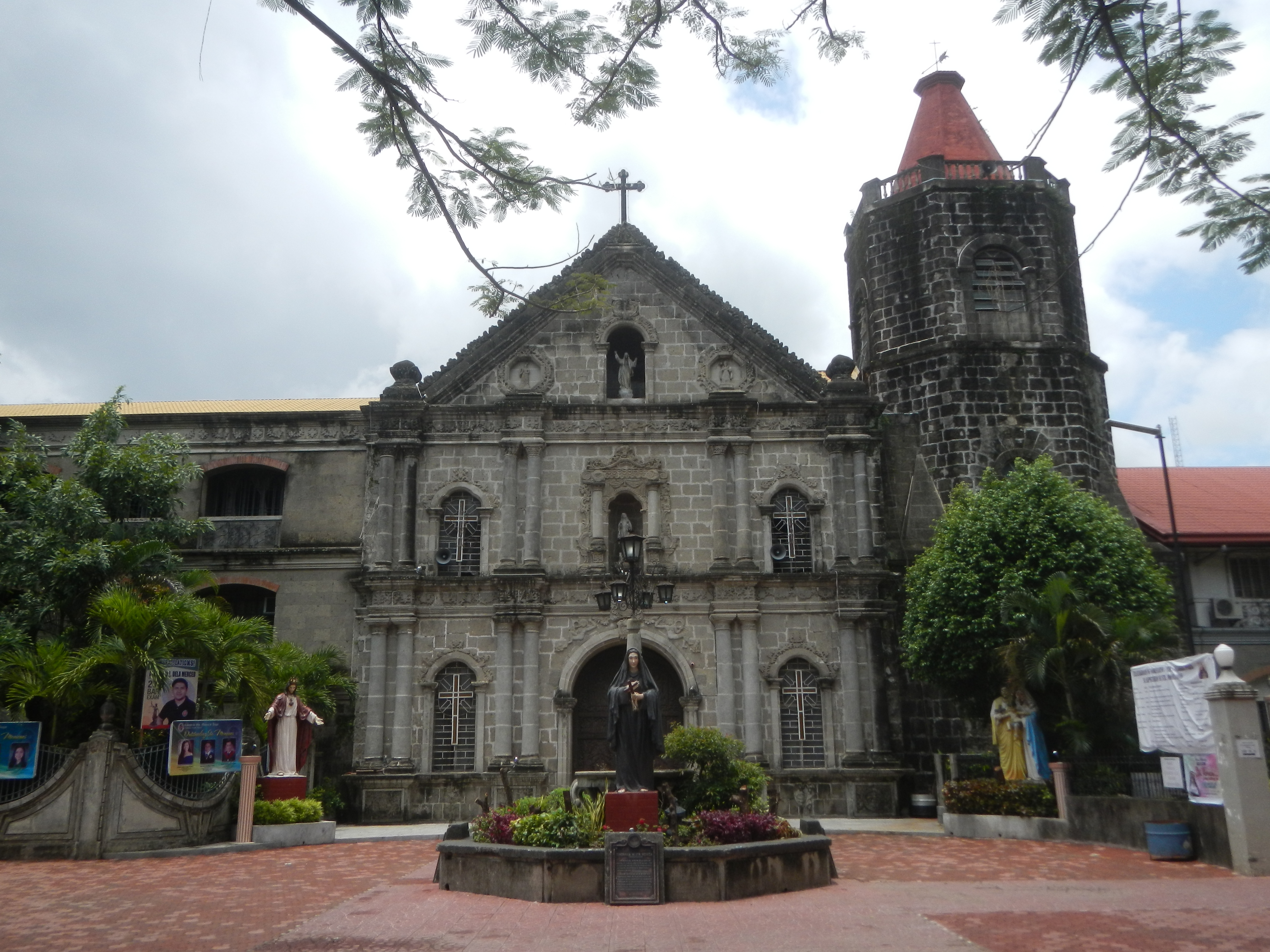
- Church facade in 2016

- Location in Bulacan Location in Luzon Location in the Philippines
- 14°55′40″N 121°01′43″E
- Location: Poblacion, Angat, Bulacan
- Country: Philippines
- Denomination: Roman Catholic

History
- Status: Parish church
- Dedication: Saint Monica

Architecture
- Functional status: Active
- Architectural type: Church building
- Style: Baroque, Rococo

Administration
- Archdiocese: Manila
- Diocese: Malolos

Clergy
- Archbishop: José Fuerte Advíncula, Jr
- Bishop: Dennis Cabanada Villarojo
- Priest(s): Manuel B. Villaroman, PC

Santa Monica Parish Church, commonly known as Angat Church, is a Roman Catholic church in Angat, Bulacan, Philippines. It is under the jurisdiction of the Diocese of Malolos and is one of the oldest churches in Bulacan province, dating back to 1758. It displays Baroque architectural characteristics and features ceiling paintings which resemble those in the Sistine Chapel.

== History ==
The town of Angat was formerly part of Quingwa, now Plaridel. Angat was oppressed by the town of San Miguel, followed by the town of Bocaue. When Angat became totally separate from Quingwa, it conquered the lands of Norzagaray and Doña Remedios Trinidad.

=== Founding ===
Angat became a parish in 1683, making it the ninth oldest parish in Bulacan and tenth in the Diocese of Malolos. Augustinian priests were in charge of the management of the church. The first Augustinian priest to arrive at Angat was Juan Morelos in 1684.

The list below presents the succeeding Augustinian parish priests who served the Sta. Monica Parish Church.

Name	Years of Pastorship
Nicolas Lopez de Baya	1689 to 1692
Gabriel de la Fuente	1692 to 1695
Lorenzo Cueto	1695
Francisco Pingarron	1695
Bernardo dela Iglesia	1695 to 1704
Jose del Valle	1704 to 1705
Bernardo dela Iglesia	1705 to 1707
Lorenzo Cueto	1707 to 1710
Juan Navarrete	1710 to 1711
Tomas Quijano	1711 to 1716
Domingo Diaz	1716 to 1719
Pedro Orense	1719 to 1722
Juan Serrano	1722

Augustinian parish priests continued to serve Santa Monica Parish Church until 1898. From 1898 to the present, the parish church has been open for Diocesan priests. Mariano de los Reyes became the first Diocesan priest of the parish in 1898.

Name	Years of Pastorship
Mariano de los Reyes	1898
Francisco Atro	1898 to 1904
Jose Paguia	1904 to 1908
Tomas Chanco	1908 to 1916
Nicanor Guzman	1916 to 1919
Pedro Domingo	1919
Deogracias Javier	1919 to 1921
Vicente Fernandez	1921 to 1922
Simplicio Fernandez	1922 to 1932
Pedro Marcelino	1932 to 1945
Casimiro Alvarez	1945 to 1946
Gabino Baluyot	1946 to 1952
Lazaro Ochuga	1952 to 1959
Leon Lopez	1959
Serafin Riego de Dios	1959 to 1970
Melchor Barcelona	1970 to 1982
Macario Manahan	1982 to 1989
Walderedo Castillo	1989 to 1990
Ernesto Mendoza	1990 to 1991
Jose Salvador Viola	1991
Domingo Salonga	1991 to 2003
Virgilio Cruz	2003 to 2013
Angelito Santiago	2013 to 2021
Manuel B. Villaroman	2021–present

== Architectural history ==
The following parish priests led the construction and redevelopment of the Santa Monica Parish Church:

- Juan Morelos – the first builder of the first church and the convent
- Gregorio Giner – built the new parish church with stronger materials in 1758. It was finished in 1773.
- Joaquin Calvo – completed the facade in 1802 and was also responsible for the construction of the slender tower
- Ignacio Manzanares – restored the convent which was also damaged by the 1863 earthquake

== Architectural features ==
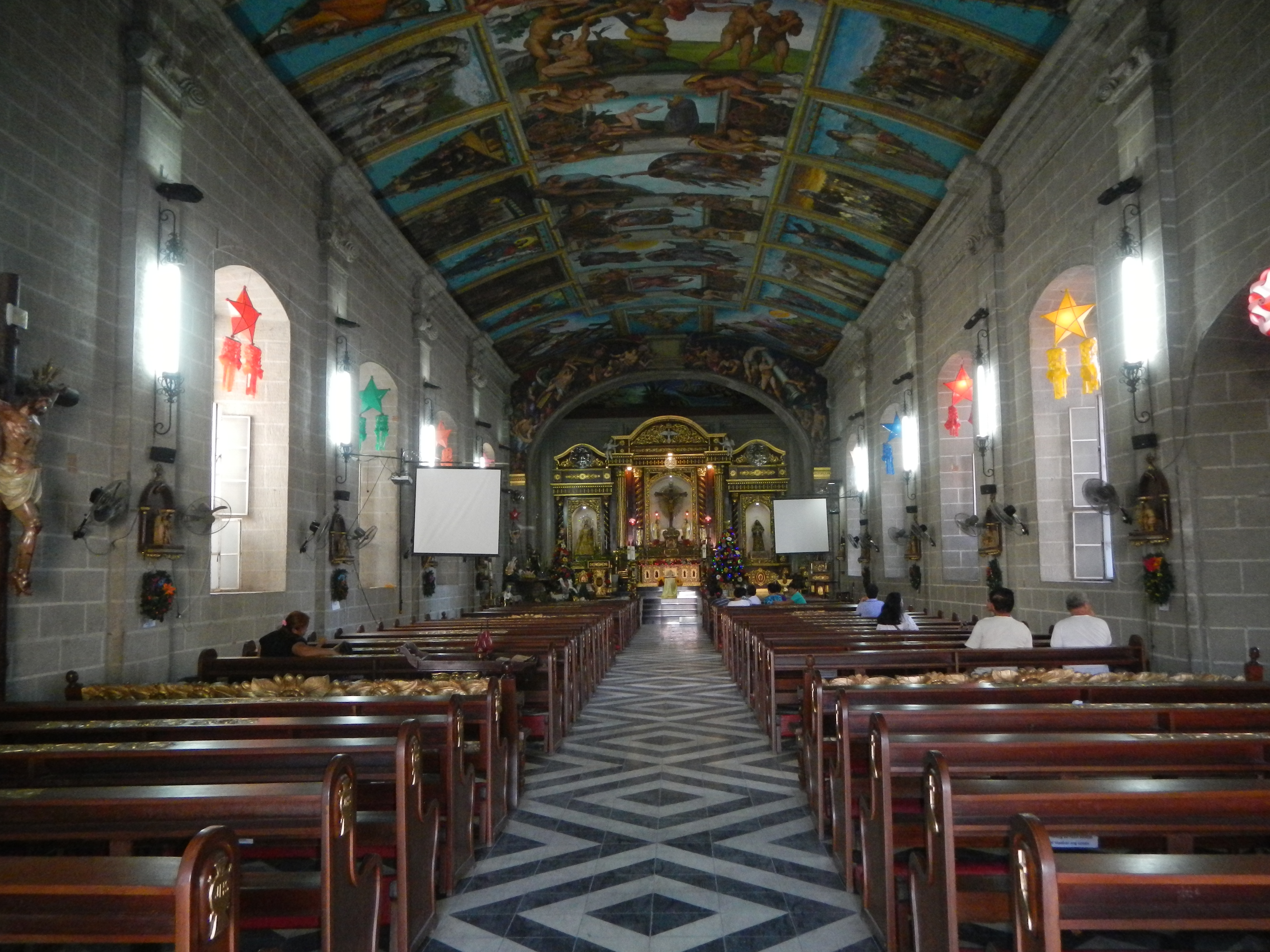
Church interior in 2016

Santa Monica de Angat Parish Church was designed in Baroque architectural style. This could be verified with the existence of 18 adobe posts, along with eight windows. Windows, statued niches, and spaces between horizontal string courses, dividing the front facade into three parts, were ornamented with floral carvings. Also, foliated crestings on the raking course of the pediment were used as an added ornamentation.

=== Ceiling art paintings ===
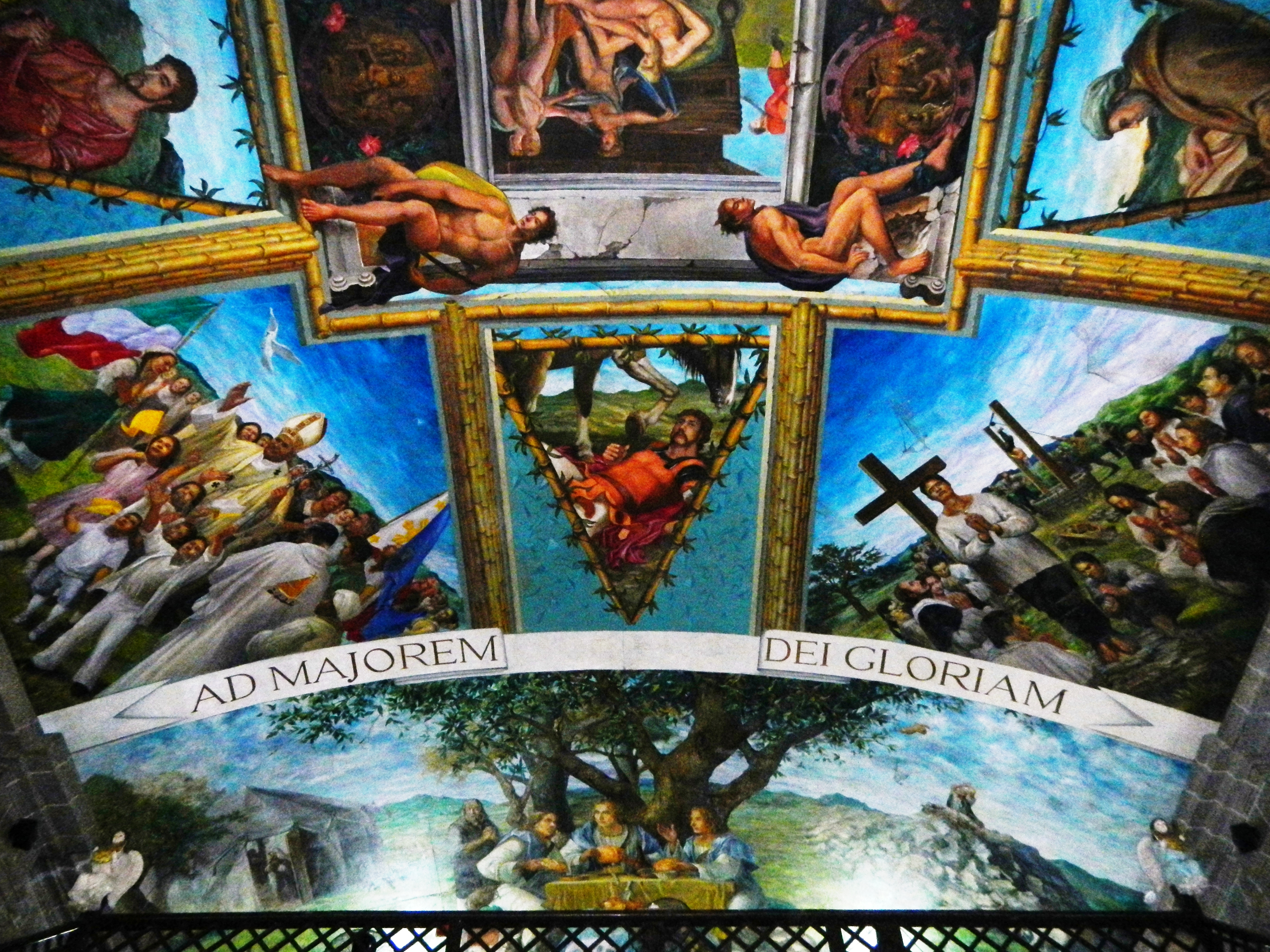
Church ceiling detail in 2014

The ceiling paintings within the interiors of the parish church resemble the ceiling paintings of the Sistine Chapel in the Vatican, Rome. History of Christianity in the Philippines and culture of Angat, Bulacan such as simbang gabi, Flores de Mayo, prusisyon ng Santissimo Sakramento, and fiesta were also incorporated within the ceiling paintings.

The ceiling paintings were started by G. Rene Robles in 1998 and finished by G. Jess Robles in 2002, in accordance with the order of Fr. Memeng.

== Present condition ==
Several interventions were conducted under the administration of Angel Santiago, who was ordained as the parish priest of Santa Monica de Angat on November 15, 2013. They include:

- Addition of six wooden posts and carvings at the retablo
- Addition of floral designs and carving of Kordero at the front side and carvings of Santa Maria, San Jose, Santa Monica, and San Agustin at the sides of the Kordero
- Addition of carvings - carvings of chalice and host at the front side and carvings of San Markos, San Juan, San Mateo, and San Lukas at the sides of the altar
- Replacement of marble flooring of the sanctuary with black and white granite floor tiles
- Modification of staircase going up to the sanctuary
