= Angat, Bulacan =

Municipality in Bulacan, Philippines

Angat
- Municipality
- Municipality of Angat
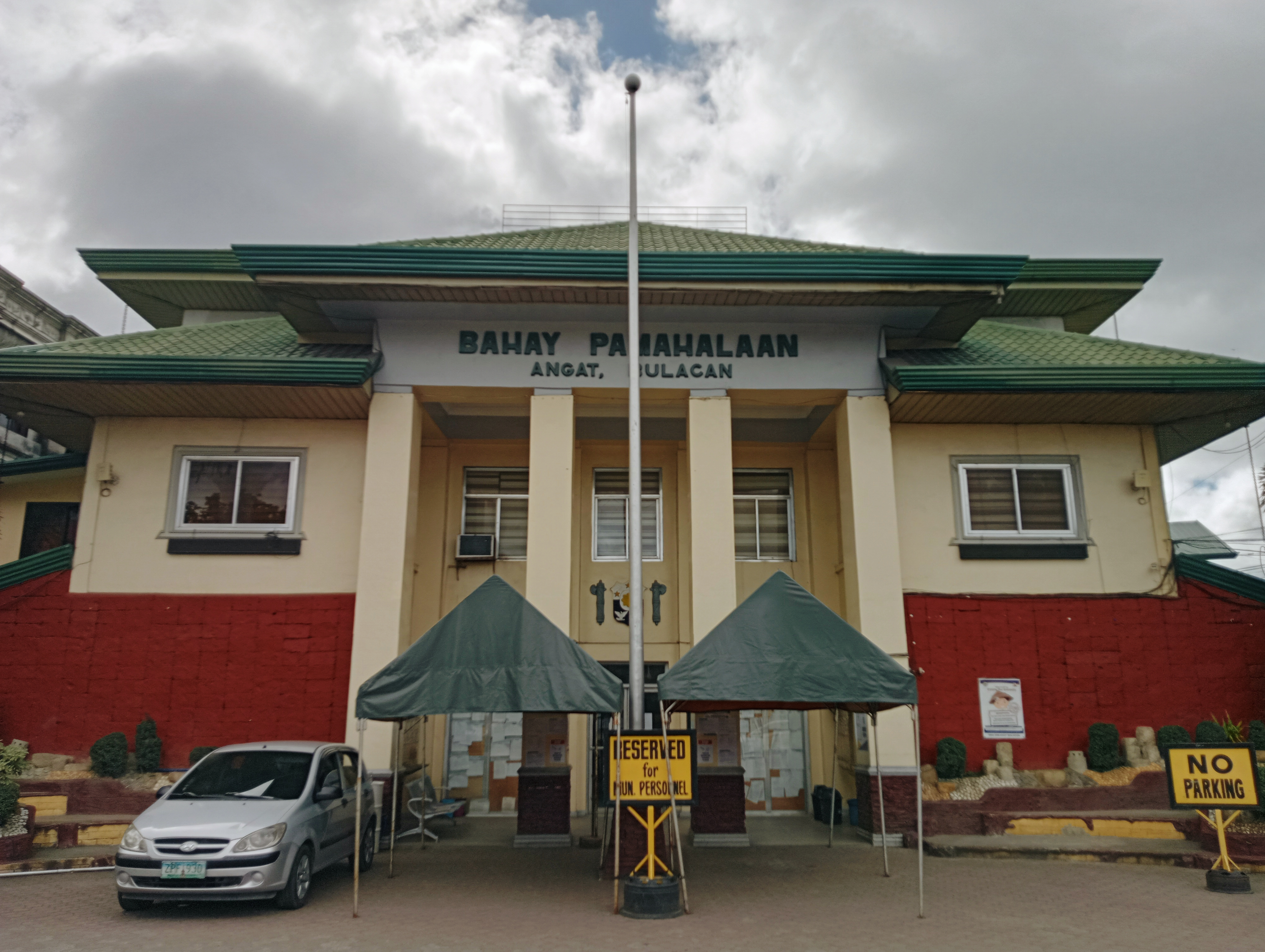
- Municipal Hall

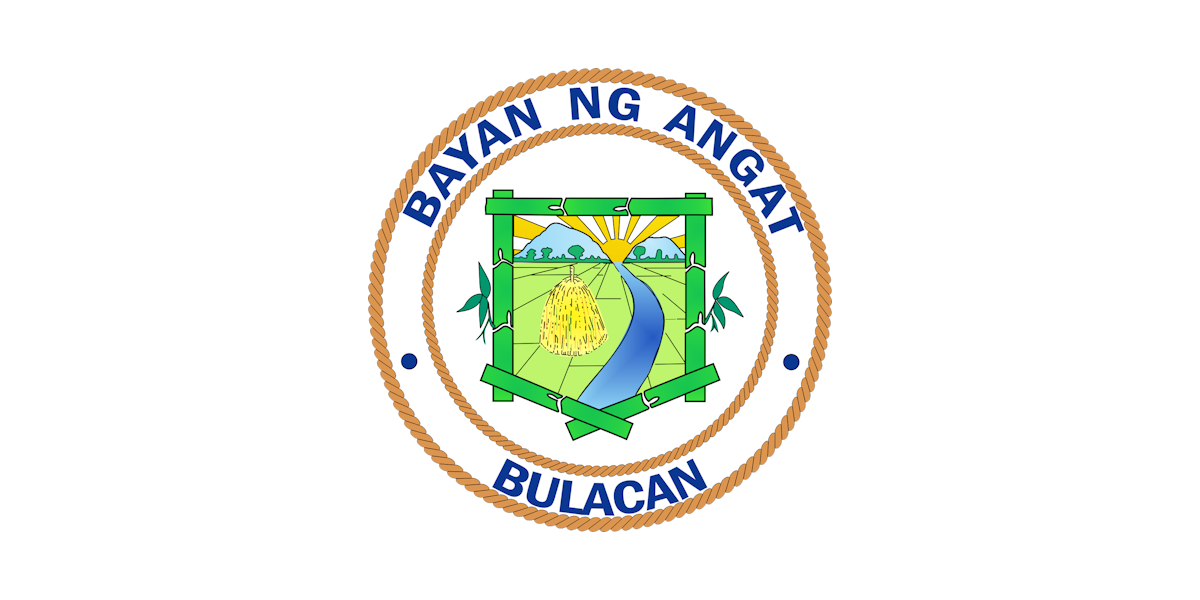
- Flag Seal
- Nickname: True Heart of Bulacan
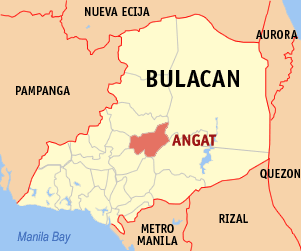
- Map of Bulacan with Angat highlighted
- Interactive map of Angat
- Location within the Philippines
- Coordinates: 14°55′41″N 121°01′46″E
- Country: Philippines
- Region: Central Luzon
- Province: Bulacan
- District: 6th district
- Founded: 1683
- Barangays: 16 (see Barangays)

Government
  - Type: Sangguniang Bayan
  - Mayor: Reynante S. Bautista
  - Vice Mayor: Arvin L. Agustin
  - Representative: Salvador A. Pleyto Sr.
  - Municipal Council: Members: Luis J. Santiago; William S. Vergel de Dios; Evelyn J. Cruz; Ramiro A. Osorio III; John Patrick DC. Solis; Arvin V. Cruz; Rex Allen P. Cruz; Melandro G. Tigas
  - Electorate: 43,892 voters (2025)

Area
  - Total: 74.00 km^{2} (28.57 sq mi)
- Elevation: 59 m (194 ft)
- Highest elevation: 157 m (515 ft)
- Lowest elevation: 20 m (66 ft)

Population (2024 census)
  - Total: 67,862
  - Density: 917.1/km^{2} (2,375/sq mi)
  - Households: 16,554

Economy
  - Income class: 1st municipal income class
  - Poverty incidence: 11.89% (2023)
  - Revenue: ₱ 369.7 million (2024)
  - Assets: ₱ 773.8 million (2024)
  - Expenditure: ₱ 253.2 million (2024)
  - Liabilities: ₱ 139.3 million (2024)

Service provider
  - Electricity: Manila Electric Company (Meralco)
- Time zone: UTC+8 (PST)
- ZIP code: 3012
- PSGC: 0301401000
- IDD : area code: +63 (0)44
- Native languages: Tagalog
- Website: www.angat.bulacan.ph

Angat [aŋˈɡat], officially the Municipality of Angat (Tagalog: Bayan ng Angat), is a municipality in the province of Bulacan, Philippines. According to the 2024 census, it has a population of 67,862 people.

== Etymology ==
The town got its name from the Tagalog word Angat (A-ngat) [aˈŋat], meaning elevated or a high piece of land.

== History ==
Angat was originally a part of the old pueblo of Quingua (now the municipality of Plaridel). This was likely due to the Angat River (Rio de Quingua) providing a direct link to Quingua, which was located in the center of an expanse of land covering plains and mountains alike.

Augustinian missionaries built a small visita (chapel) under the Parochial ministry of Paroquia de Santiago Matamoro de Quingua. The visita of Angat was elevated to a parish church in 1683, leading to Angat being established as a new pueblo.

Still standing and legible today is the inscription of the Roman numeral MDCCXII (1712) on the façade of the church, indicating the year the town was established as a regular municipality.

On September 13, 1977, the barangays of Camachile and Pulong Sampaloc were ceded to the newly established municipality of Doña Remedios Trinidad by virtue of Presidential Decree No. 1196.

== Geography ==
San Rafael and Bustos form the northern border of Angat. The Sierra Madre Mountain Range borders Angat to the east, and to its south by the towns of Norzagaray and Santa Maria. Angat is 44 kilometres (27 mi) from Malolos, 51 kilometres (32 mi) from Manila, 21 kilometres (13 mi) from San Jose del Monte, and 14 kilometres (8.7 mi) from Bustos.

The municipality of Angat has a hilly and mountainous landscape that nestles the Angat River (Bulacan River). The river's main basin of water resource is the Sierra Madre Mountain Range, the longest mountain range in the Philippines in Luzon. During inclement climate conditions like continuous rainy days, the water inundates different tributaries in its adjoining municipalities through different rivers. To its southeast are four rivers: the Santa Maria River of Santa Maria, the Bunsuran River of Pandi, Bulacan, the Balagtas River of Balagtas, Bulacan, and the Bocaue River of Bocaue.

Angat's mountainous and hilly areas have an abundance of trees that are a source of timber and wood materials. These areas have also become sites for illegal logging. The mountainous areas and lands close to the river shore, some of which are privately owned, are rich in mineral deposits of silica. The vast area around Angat River is a very high source of rocks and pebbles used for construction and garden landscaping.

=== Barangays ===
Angat is subdivided into 16 barangays, as shown in the matrix below. Each barangay consists of puroks, while some have sitios.

PSGC	Barangay	Population			±% p.a.	
		2024		2010		
031401001	Banaban	3.2%	2,140	1,539	▴	2.31%
031401002	Baybay	1.3%	855	836	▴	0.16%
031401003	Binagbag	7.6%	5,182	4,641	▴	0.77%
031401005	Donacion	3.8%	2,603	2,502	▴	0.27%
031401006	Encanto	6.9%	4,665	4,289	▴	0.58%
031401007	Laog	1.8%	1,225	1,053	▴	1.06%
031401008	Marungko	6.4%	4,344	4,263	▴	0.13%
031401009	Niugan	6.8%	4,607	4,362	▴	0.38%
031401010	Paltok	2.1%	1,447	1,369	▴	0.39%
031401013	Pulong Yantok	7.3%	4,940	3,990	▴	1.49%
031401014	San Roque (Poblacion)	7.6%	5,168	4,642	▴	0.75%
031401015	Santa Cruz (Poblacion)	8.3%	5,641	5,663	▾	−0.03%
031401016	Santa Lucia	3.6%	2,475	2,663	▾	−0.51%
031401017	Santo Cristo (Poblacion)	7.4%	4,999	4,859	▴	0.20%
031401018	Sulucan	8.4%	5,723	5,557	▴	0.20%
031401019	Taboc	4.7%	3,223	3,104	▴	0.26%
	Total		67,862	55,332	▴	1.43%

=== Climate ===
The prevailing climatic conditions in the municipality is categorized into two (2) types: Wet season (Rainy Season or Monsoon Season) and Dry Season (Summer Season).

Climate data for Angat, Bulacan
Month	Jan	Feb	Mar	Apr	May	Jun	Jul	Aug	Sep	Oct	Nov	Dec	Year
Mean daily maximum °C (°F)	29 (84)	31 (88)	32 (90)	34 (93)	34 (93)	31 (88)	30 (86)	30 (86)	30 (86)	30 (86)	30 (86)	29 (84)	30 (86)
Mean daily minimum °C (°F)	20 (68)	19 (66)	21 (70)	22 (72)	23 (73)	23 (73)	23 (73)	23 (73)	23 (73)	22 (72)	21 (70)	20 (68)	21 (70)
Average precipitation cm (inches)	1.7 (0.7)	0.7 (0.3)	0.5 (0.2)	2.4 (0.9)	15.3 (6)	35.5 (14)	50.4 (19.8)	51.6 (20.3)	37.4 (14.7)	22.5 (8.8)	16.3 (6.4)	6.8 (2.7)	240.8 (94.8)
Source: http://www.weatherbase.com/weather/weather.php3?s=984300&refer=&units=metric

== Demographics ==
Population census of Angat
Year	Pop.	±% p.a.
1903	6,961	—
1918	9,019	+1.74%
1939	11,060	+0.98%
1948	12,776	+1.62%
1960	15,051	+1.37%
1970	19,798	+2.78%
1975	23,344	+3.36%
1980	24,844	+1.25%
1990	34,494	+3.34%
1995	39,037	+2.35%
2000	46,033	+3.60%
2007	53,117	+1.99%
2010	55,332	+1.50%
2015	59,237	+1.31%
2020	65,617	+2.18%
2024	67,862	+0.81%
Source: Philippine Statistics Authority

In the 2020 census, the population of Angat, Bulacan, was 65,617 people, with a density of 890 inhabitants per square kilometer or 2,300 inhabitants per square mile.

=== Religion ===
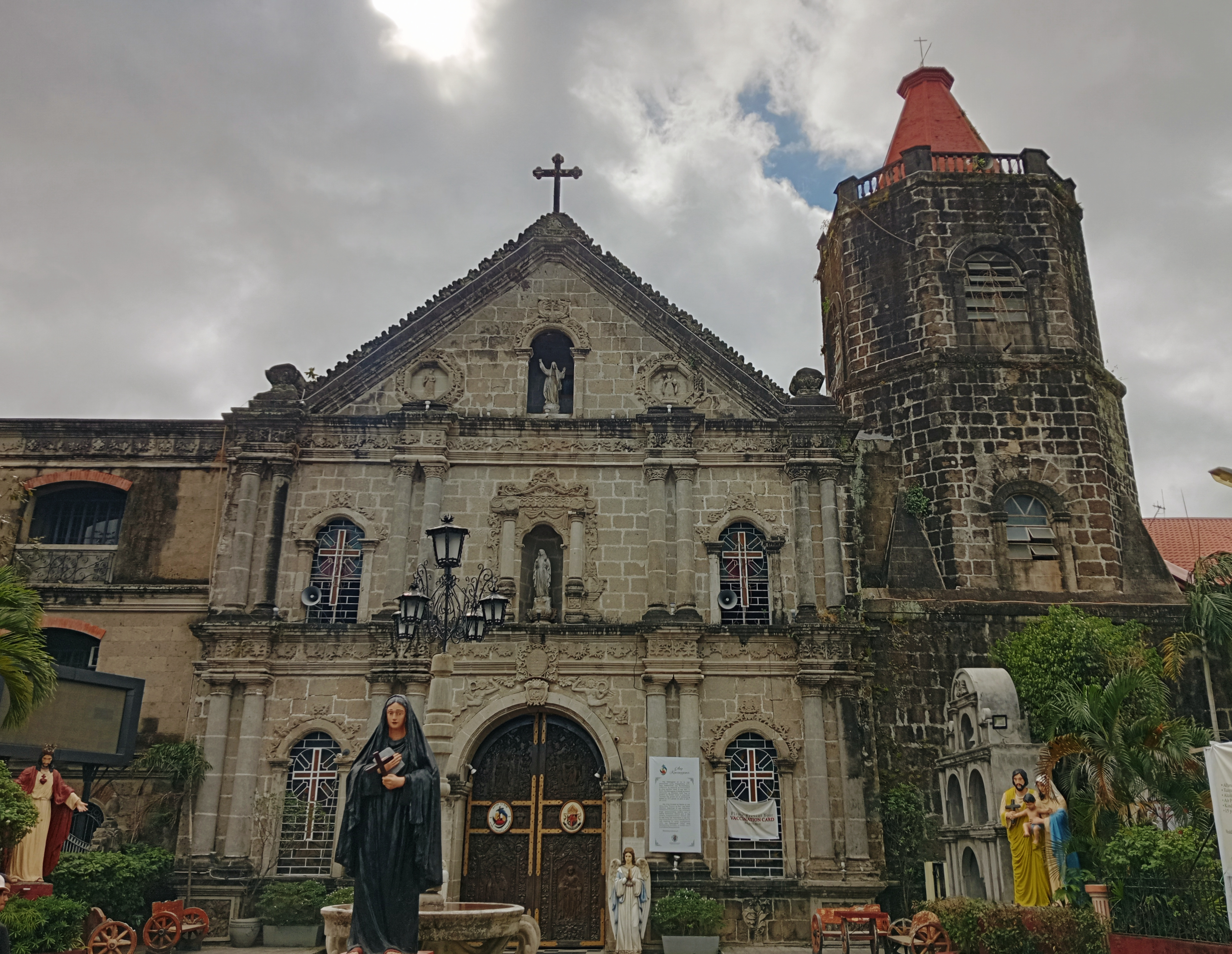
Santa Monica de Angat Church

The people of Angat are mostly devout Roman Catholics. Their patron saint is Saint Monica. The Santa Monica de Angat Church displays baroque architecture, with its interior replicating the Sistine Chapel, recently remodeled but preserving its old architecture. In 1983, the Parish of the town celebrated its Tricentennial Foundation.

Today, Angat is divided into three parishes and one quasi-parish under the Vicariate of Baliuag, Roman Catholic Diocese of Malolos: the Saint Paul the Apostle Parish in Barangay Niugan, the Santa Rita de Cascia Parish in Barangay Binagbag, Santa Monica de Angat Parish in Poblacion, and Immaculate Conception Quasi-Parish in Barangay Marungko.

Other religious groups include the Members Church of God International popularly known as Ang Dating Daan, Iglesia ni Cristo, and Jehovah's Witness, Methodists, Aglipayans, Adventists, Baptists, Mormons. There also some Evangelical, Pentecostal, Charismatic churches, ministries, fellowships and religious groups. Islam (Muslims) could also be found.

== Economy ==
Poverty incidence of Angat (%)

Source: Philippine Statistics Authority

== Government ==
=== Elected officials ===
2025-2028 Angat Municipal Officials
Position	Name	Party
Mayor	Reynante "Jowar" S. Bautista	Lakas
Vice Mayor	Arvin L. Agustin	Lakas
Councilors	Luis "Wowie" J. Santiago	Lakas
Councilors	William S. Vergel de Dios	Lakas
Councilors	Evelyn "Blem" J. Cruz	Lakas
Councilors	Ramiro A. Osorio III	Lakas
Councilors	John Patrick DC. Solis	Lakas
Councilors	Arvin "Bino" V. Cruz	NUP
Councilors	Rex Allen "Patay" P. Cruz	NUP
Councilors	Melandro "Andro" G. Tigas	Lakas
Ex Officio Municipal Council Members
ABC President	Alexander M. Tigas	Nonpartisan
SK Federation President	Mary Grace M. Evangelista	Nonpartisan

=== List of former mayors ===
No.	Municipal Mayors	Took office	Left office
1	Mariano Santiago	1901	1902
2	Pedro Otayco	1902	1903
3	Francisco Vergel de Dios	1903	1904
4	Damian Santos	1904	1905
5	Damaso Pascual	1905	1906
6	Luciano de Guzman	1906	1909
7	Pablo Capistrano	1909	1916
8	Matias A. Fernando	1916	1920
9	Severo Rivera	1920	1922
10	Gerardo Santos	1922	1925
11	Atilano de Guzman	1925	1931
12	Dr. Crispulo Cruz	1931	1934
13	Pablo Amisola	1934	1940
14	Dr. Francisco Infantado	1940	1940
15	Jose S. Santos	1940	1942
16	Felix Ventura	1942	1943
17	Dr. Pedro Vergel de Dios	1943	1943
18	Atilano de Guzman	1943	1943
19	Engr. Vicente Salvador	1943	1943
20	Dr. Marcelino de Guzman	1943	1944
21	Pedro Cinco	1944	1944
22	Agapito Cruz Correa	1944	1944
23	Atty. Pablo Santos	1944	1945
24	Dr. Luis Infantado	1945	1945
25	Higino Adriano	1945	1946
26	Jose S. Santos	1946	1947
27	Atilano de Guzman	1947	1947
28	Faustino Sombillo	1947	1948
29	Francisco F. Illescas	1948	1954
30	Benito Cruz	1954	1963
31	Francisco Illescas	1964	1980
32	Atty. Florante Cruz	1980	1986
33	Francisca C. Valarao	1986	6 months
34	Leonardo R. de Leon	1987	1998
35	Apolonio P. Marcelo Jr.	1998	2000
36	Angelito Vergel de Dios	2000	2001
37	Leonardo R. de Leon	2001	2010
38	Gilberto C. Santos	2010	2013
39	Leonardo R. de Leon	2013	2022
40	Reynante S. Bautista	2022	present

== Education ==
The Angat Schools District Office governs all educational institutions within the municipality. It oversees the management and operations of all private and public, from primary to secondary schools.

=== List of schools ===
Private Pre-Elem/Elementary Schools
School	Location
Angat Ecumenical Kindergarten School	Santa Cruz
Colegio De Santa Monica De Angat	Poblacion
Lourdes College of Bulacan Inc.	Marungko
St. Joseph Kalinangan Integrated School Inc.	Sulucan
Wisdom Jade Academy	Niugan

Public Pre-Elem/Elementary Schools
School	Location
Atilano S. De Guzman Elementary School	Taboc
Pablo C. Capistrano Elementary School	Banaban
Baybay Elementary School	Baybay
Benito C. Cruz Elementary School	Santa Lucia
Col. Vicente Salvador Elementary School	Laog
Don Pablo Amisola Memorial School	Niugan
Dr. Antonio C. Villarama Memorial School	Marungko
Francisco F. Illescas Elementary School	Binagbag
Marcelo L. Adriano Memorial School	Encanto
Matias A. Fernando Memorial School	San Roque
Osias M. Esteban Elementary School	Pulong Yantok
Paltoc Elementary School	Paltoc
Antonio C. Cruz - Sulucan Elementary School	Sulucan
Teodoso R. Manuel Elementary School	Donacion

Private Secondary Schools
School	Location
Colegio De Santa Monica De Angat	Poblacion
Franklin Delano Roosevelt Memorial School	Santo Cristo
St. Joseph Kalinangan Integrated School Inc.	Sulucan
Lourdes College of Bulacan Inc.	Marungko

Public Secondary Schools
School	Location
Angat National High School	Taboc
Angel M. del Rosario High School	Pulong Yantok
Binagbag National High School	Binagbag
Pres. Diosdado P. Macapagal Memorial High School	Santa Cruz

Technical/Vocational Schools
School	Location
Bulacan Polytechnic College	Santa Cruz

Tertiary Schools
School	Location
Lourdes College of Bulacan	Marungko

=== Colegio de Sta. Monica de Angat ===
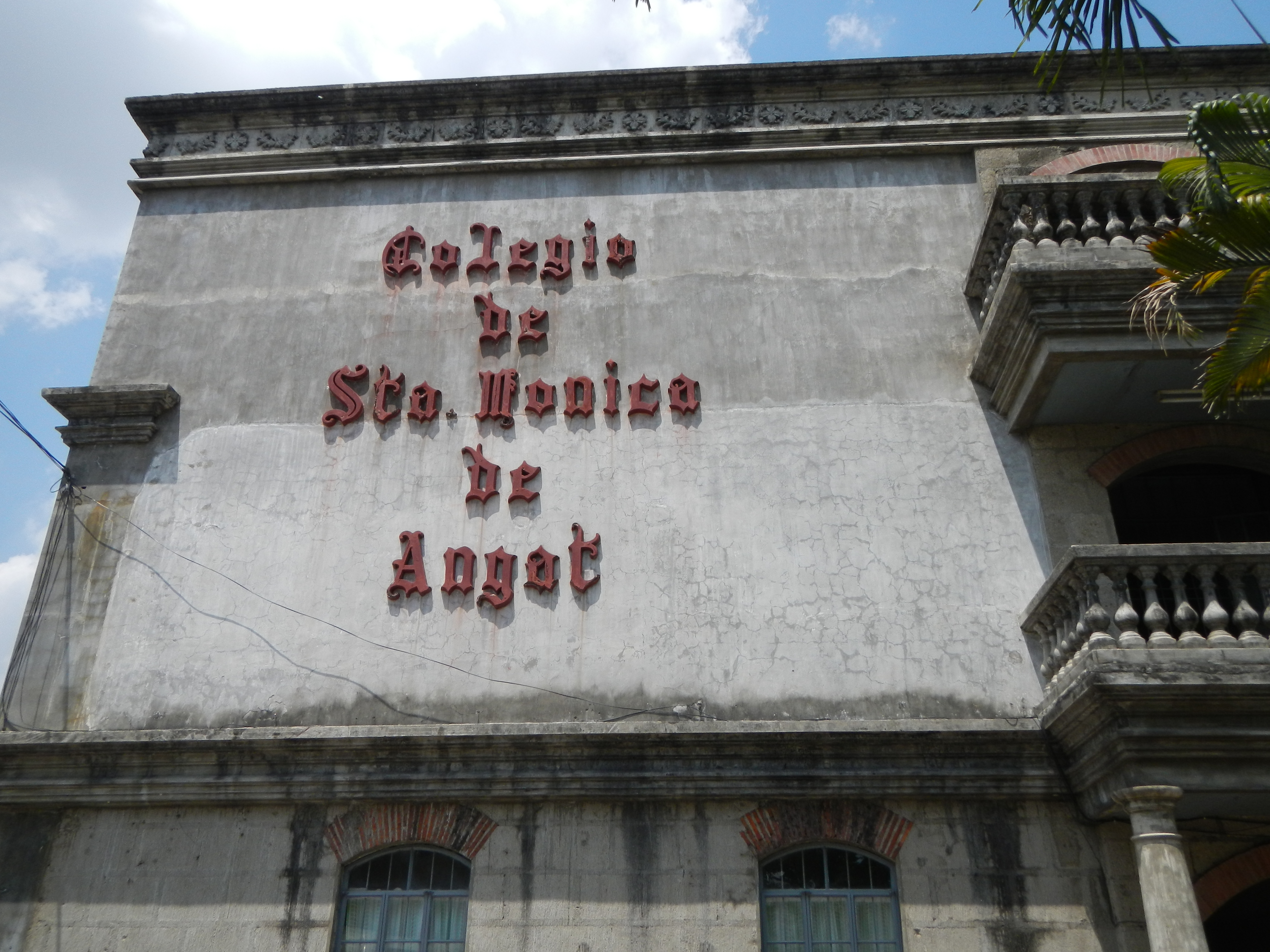
Colegio de Sta Monica de Angat

The Catholic school was established in 1983. In 1987, the high school department was formally opened. A year later, the school's name was changed to Colegio de Santa Monica de Angat to reflect the town's Hispanic heritage. In the same year, the St. Joseph Building was inaugurated. The first batch graduated in 1990.

== Culture and Tourism ==
=== Town festivities and events ===
As a predominantly Roman Catholic Christian community, every barangay has their own unique way of celebrating fiestas in honor of their respective patron saint. In the town proper where the old beautiful church of Angat is located, the locals celebrate their fiesta every 4 May in honor of its patron St. Monica, mother of St. Augustine.

Angat is celebrating GulayAngat Festival (Gunita ng Lahi at Yamang Angat; lit., "Angat Heritage and Treasure Festival") which features the means of livelihood of the town's people. It is celebrated every 3rd week of the month of October. It was accompanied by the establishment of the town of Angat. There were lot of activities happened in the festival such as:

- Hari at Reyna ng GulayAngat (King and Queen of GulayAngat) – featuring the beautiful young men and women of each barangay in Angat.
- Hapag ng Pamana (Heritage Table) – presenting unique dishes made from vegetables.
- Indakan sa GulayAngat (GulayAngat Dance) – highlighting the talent of everyone in their respective barangays through dancing.
- DepEd Day – featuring the talents of the students in Angat.
- Laro ng Laking GulayAngat (GulayAngat Traditional Games) – presenting the different Filipino games just like; Hilahang Lubid (tug-of-war), Karera ng Sako (sack race), Patintero, Palo Sebo (bamboo pole climbing), Dama, Sungka, Agawang Buko (a contact game which players struggle to get a coconut similar to rugby and American football) and Sepak Takraw.

=== Tourist attractions ===
- Angat River
- Heritage Houses
- Santa Monica Church (Santa Monica de Angat Church)
- Gawad Kalinga (Enchanted Farm)
- Fr. Blanco Museum (collection of flora de filipina)

== Gallery ==
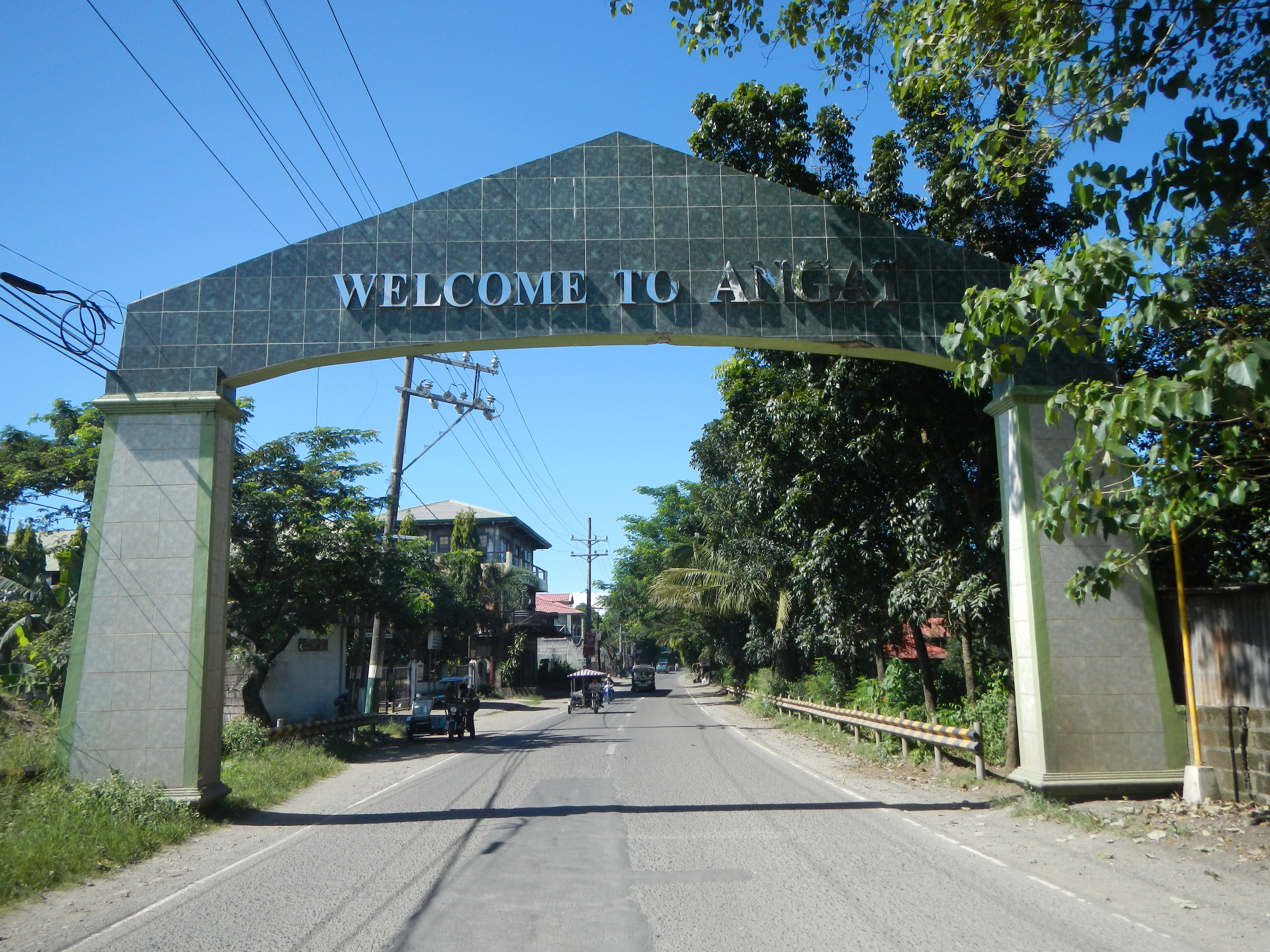
Angat Welcome Arch

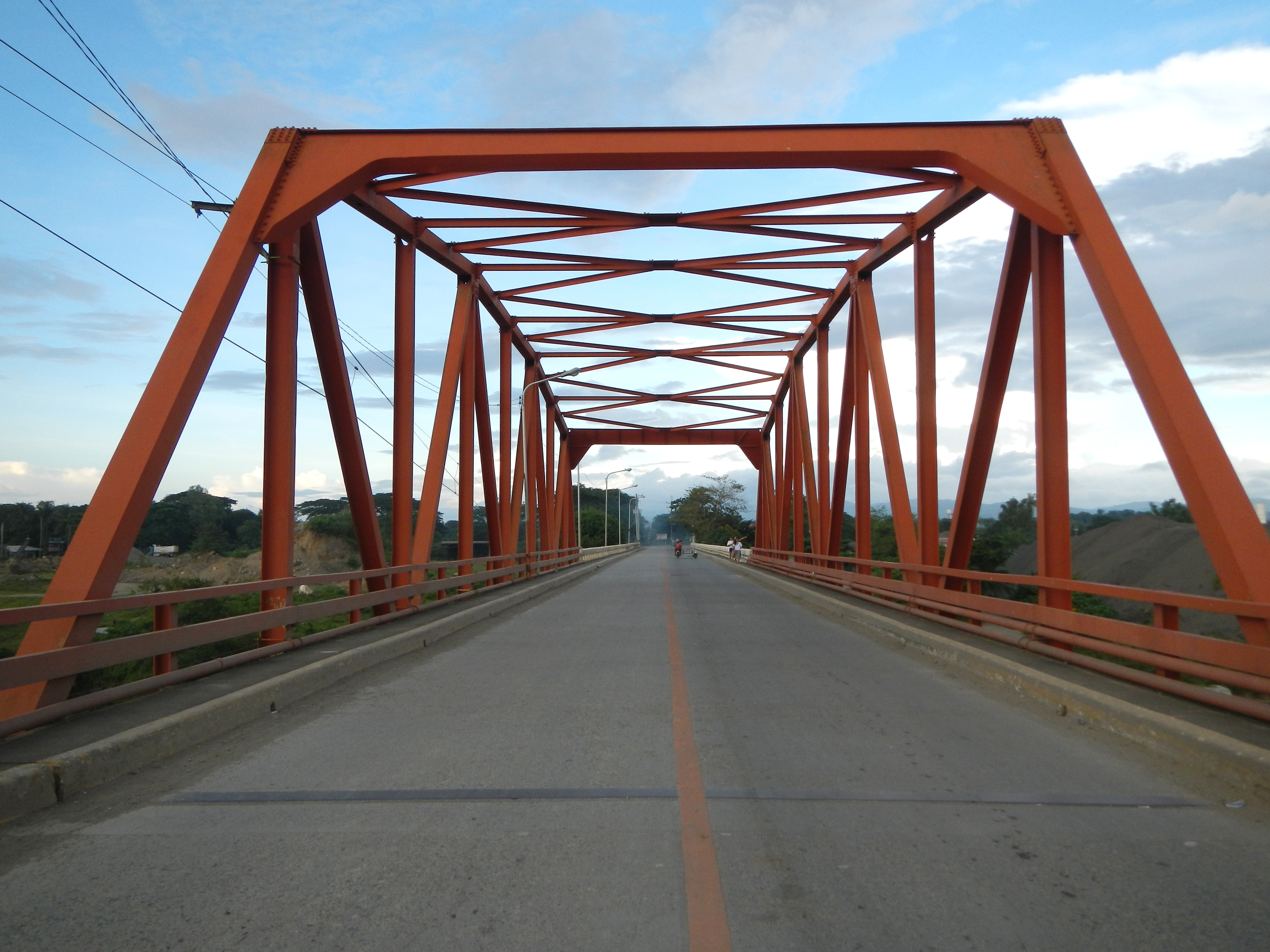
Santa Lucia Bridge (crossing the Angat River from the Municipality of Angat to the Municipality of Doña Remedios Trinidad)

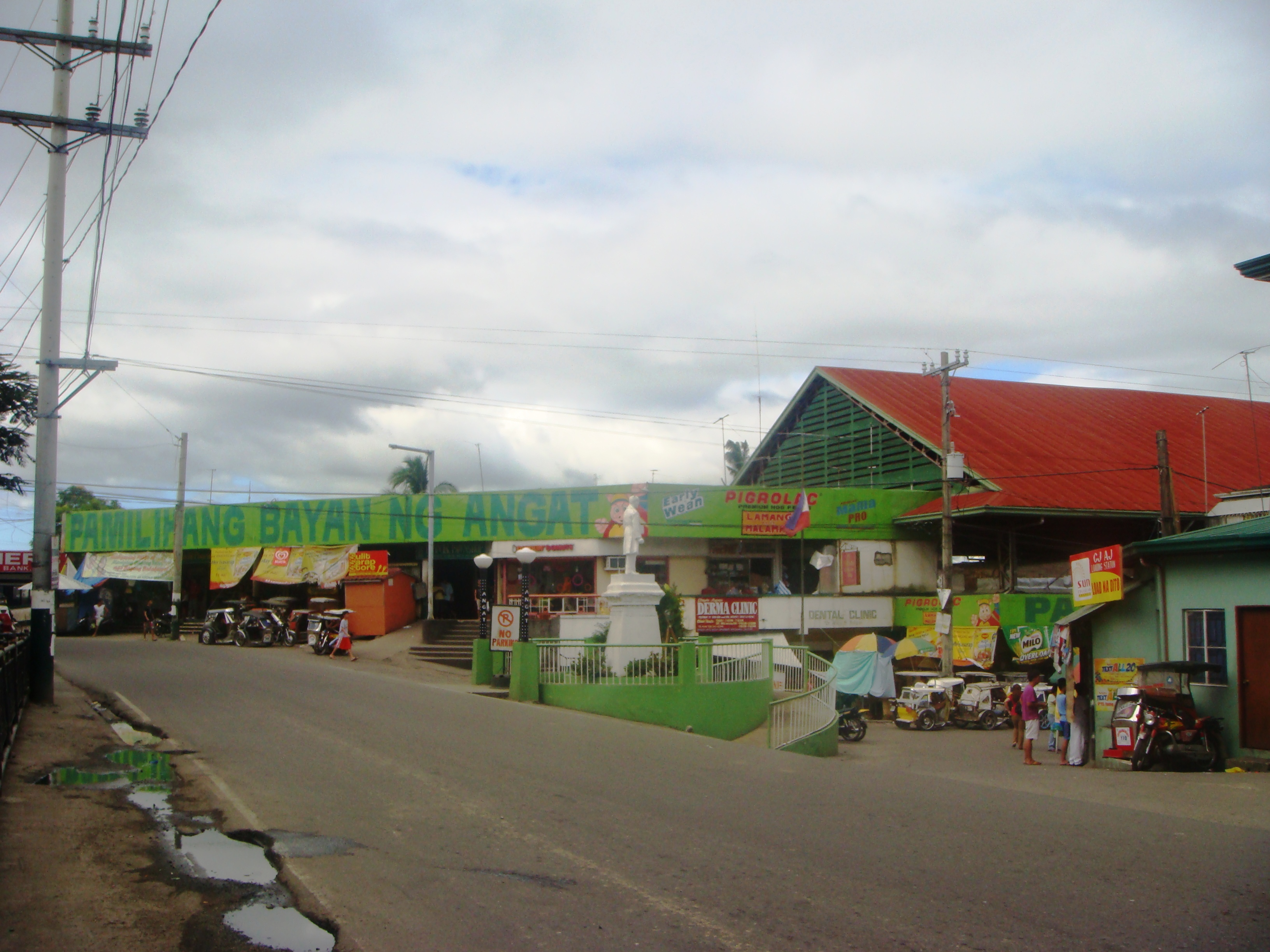
Angat Wet and Dry Public Market

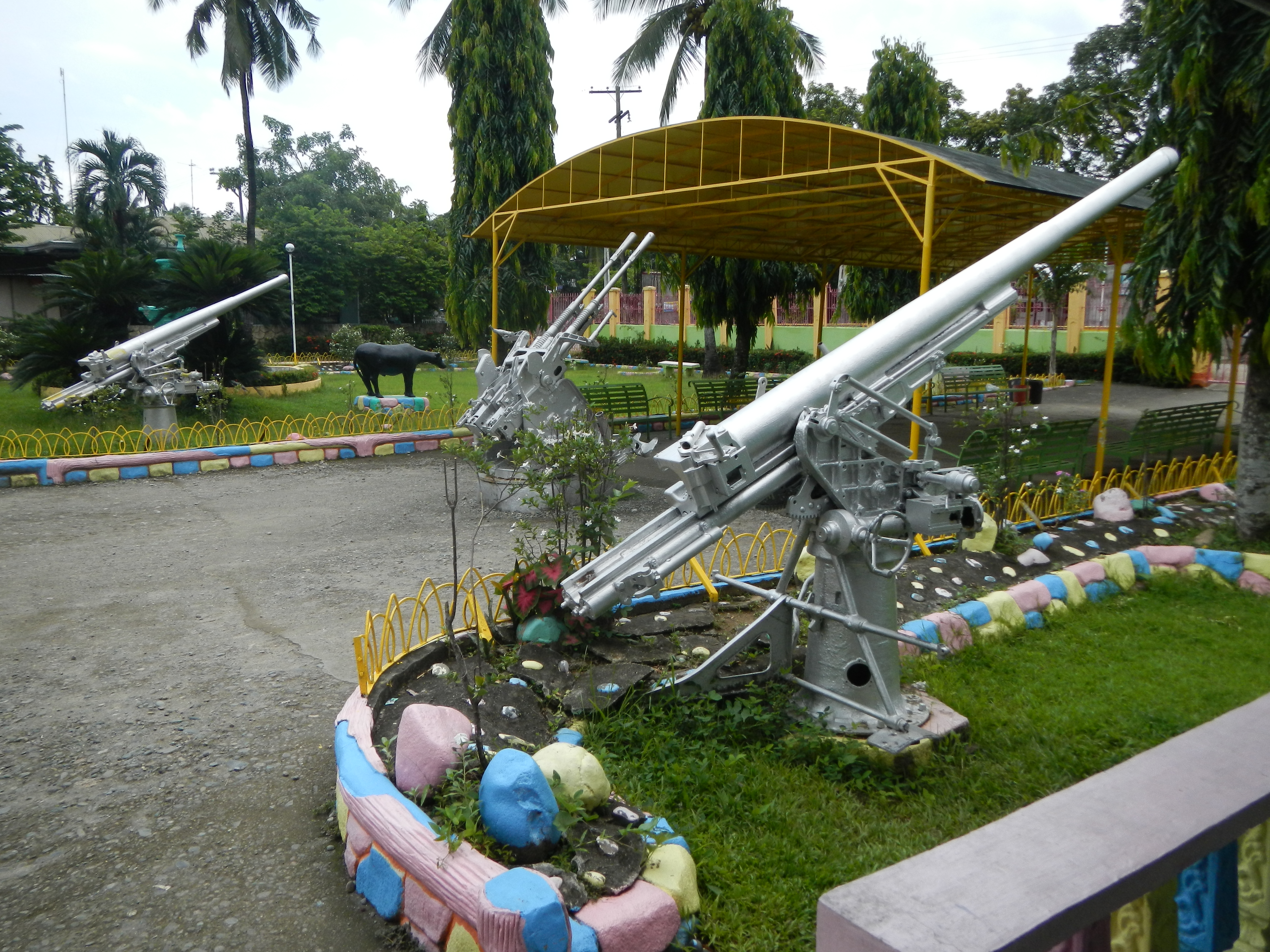
Villarama Park at Dr. Antonio C. Villarama Memorial School

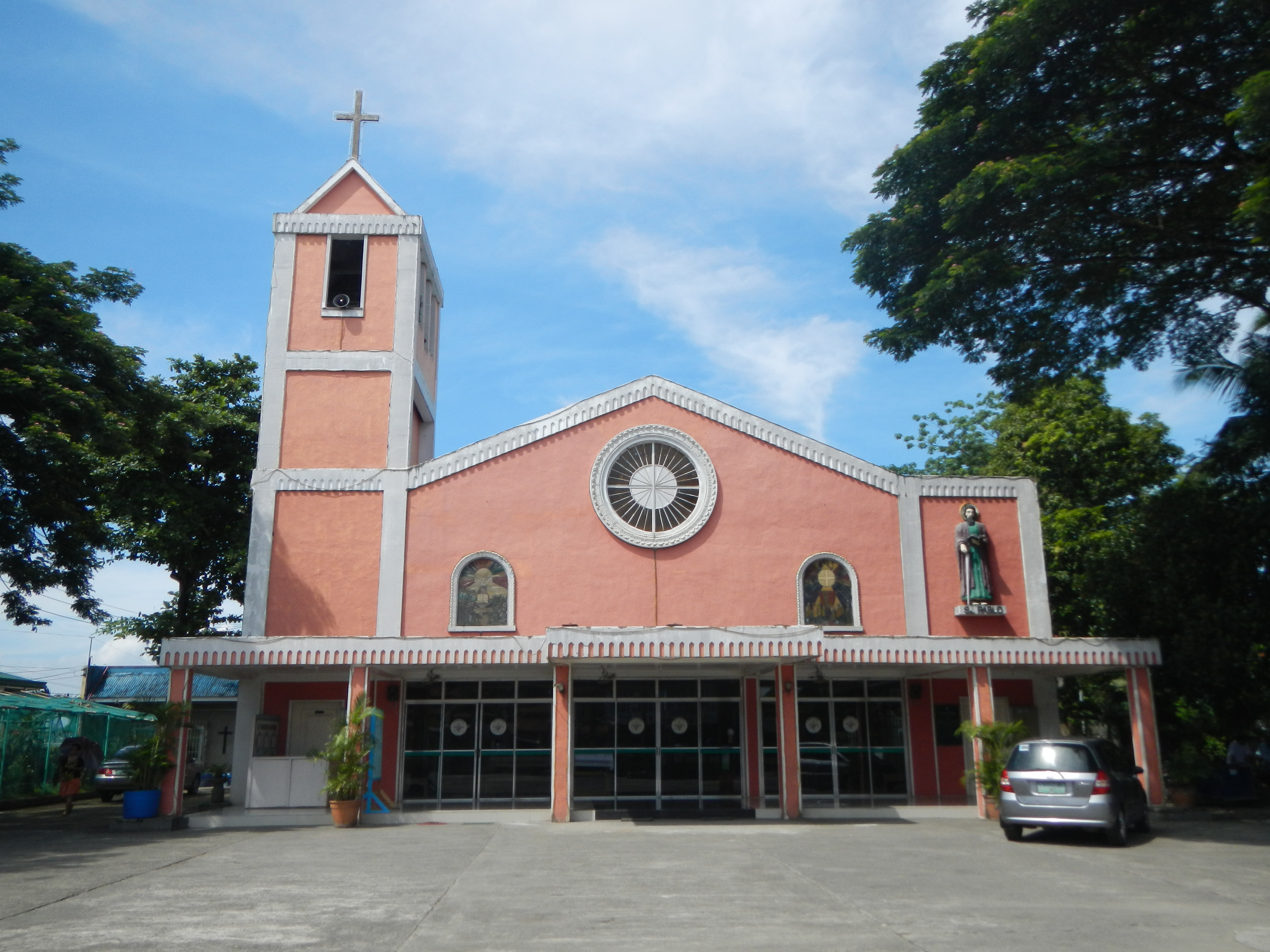
San Pablo Apostol Parish Church

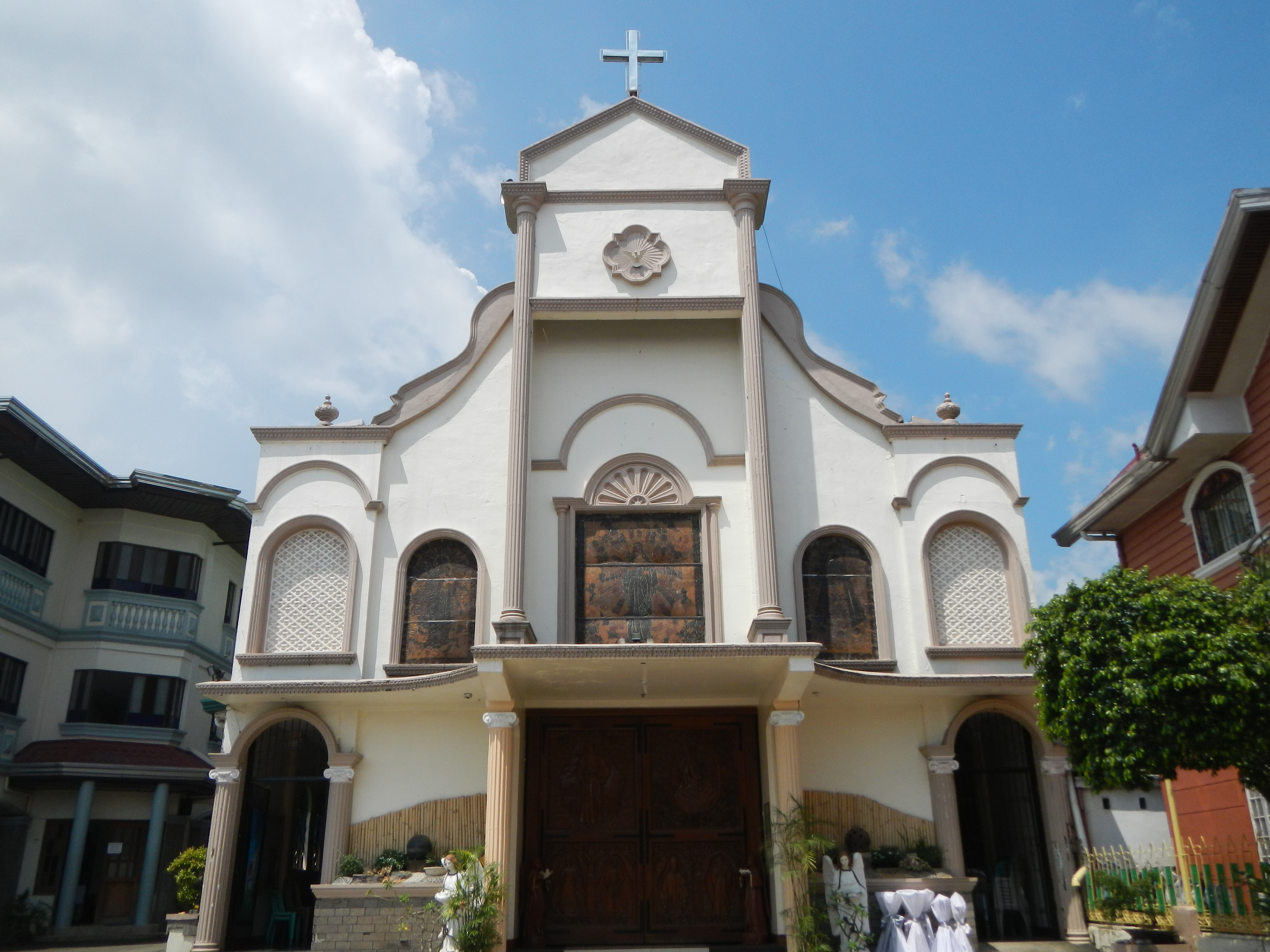
Santa Rita de Cascia Quasi-Parish Church

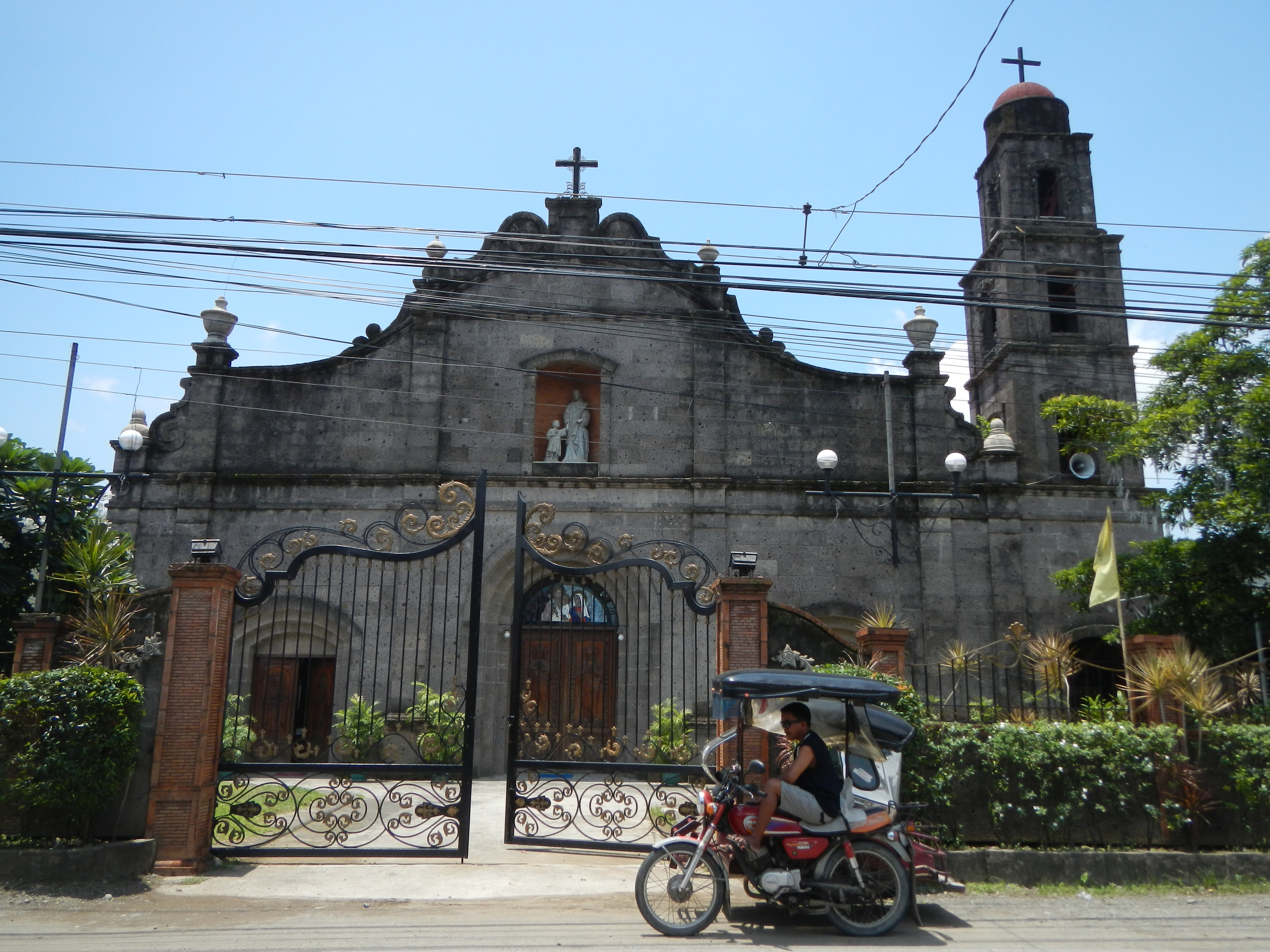
St. Joseph Sub-Parish Church

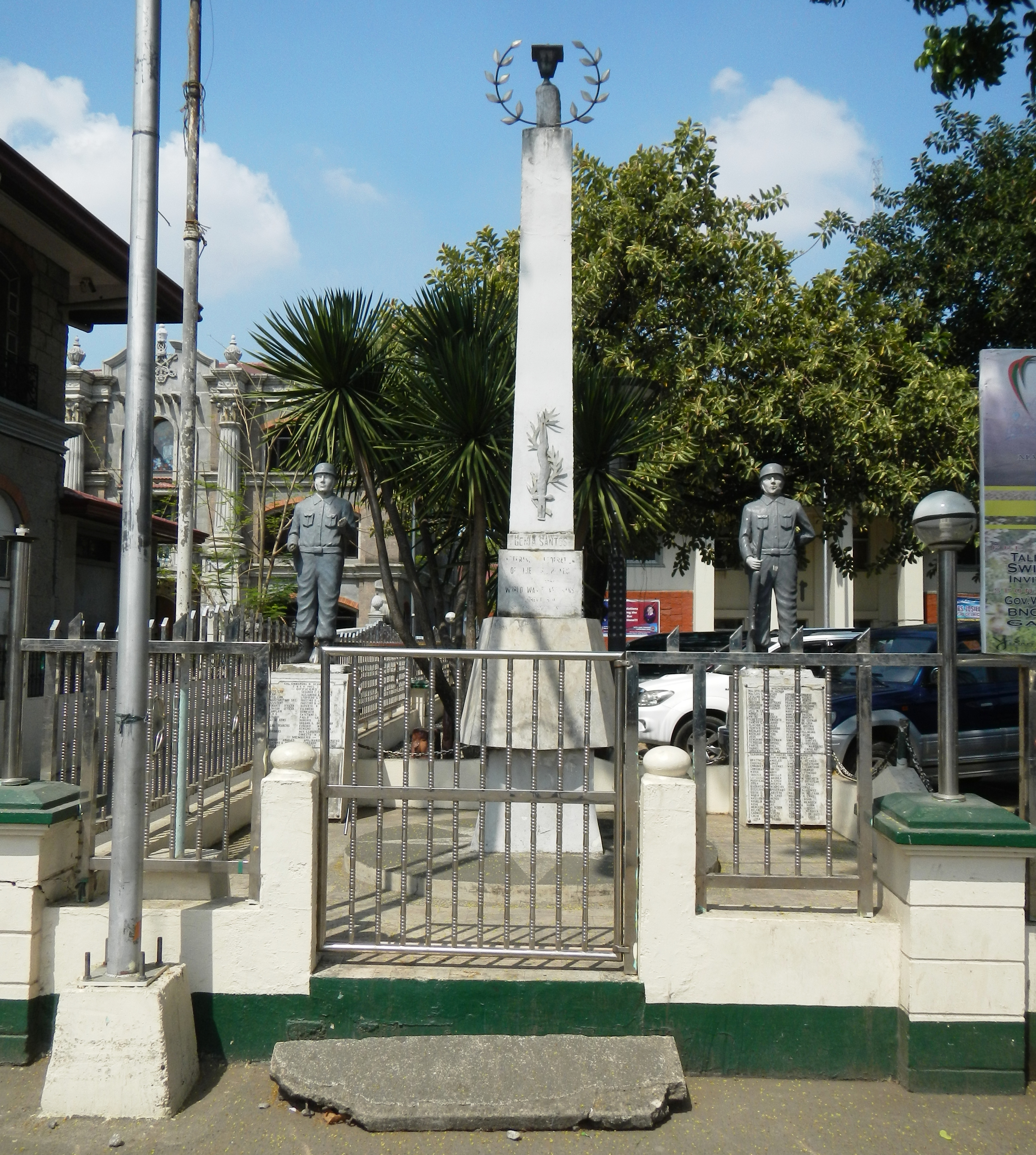
Veterans Federation of the Philippines marker for the World War II Veterans - Angat Chapter

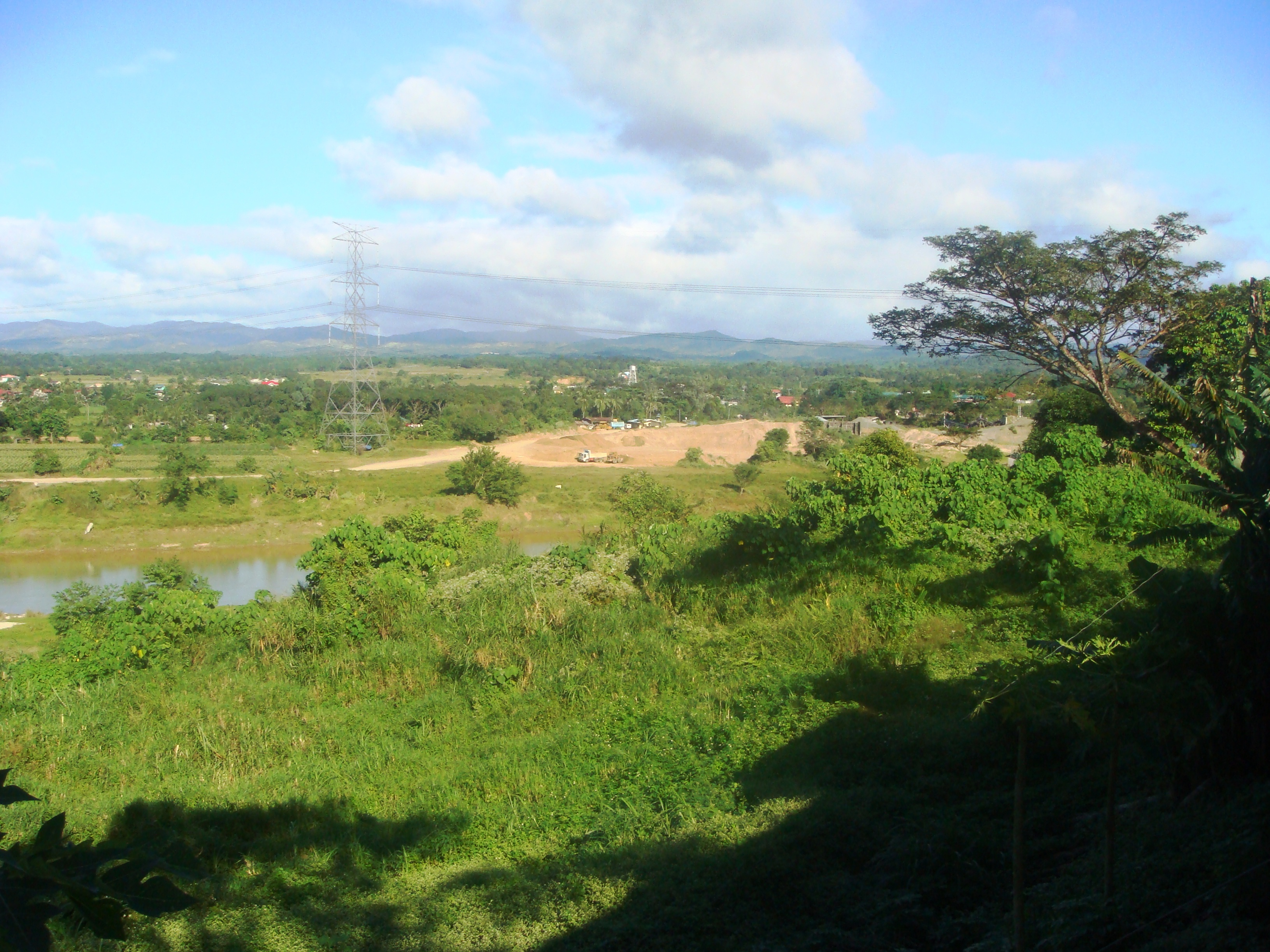
Overlooking view of Angat quarry and Sierra Madre

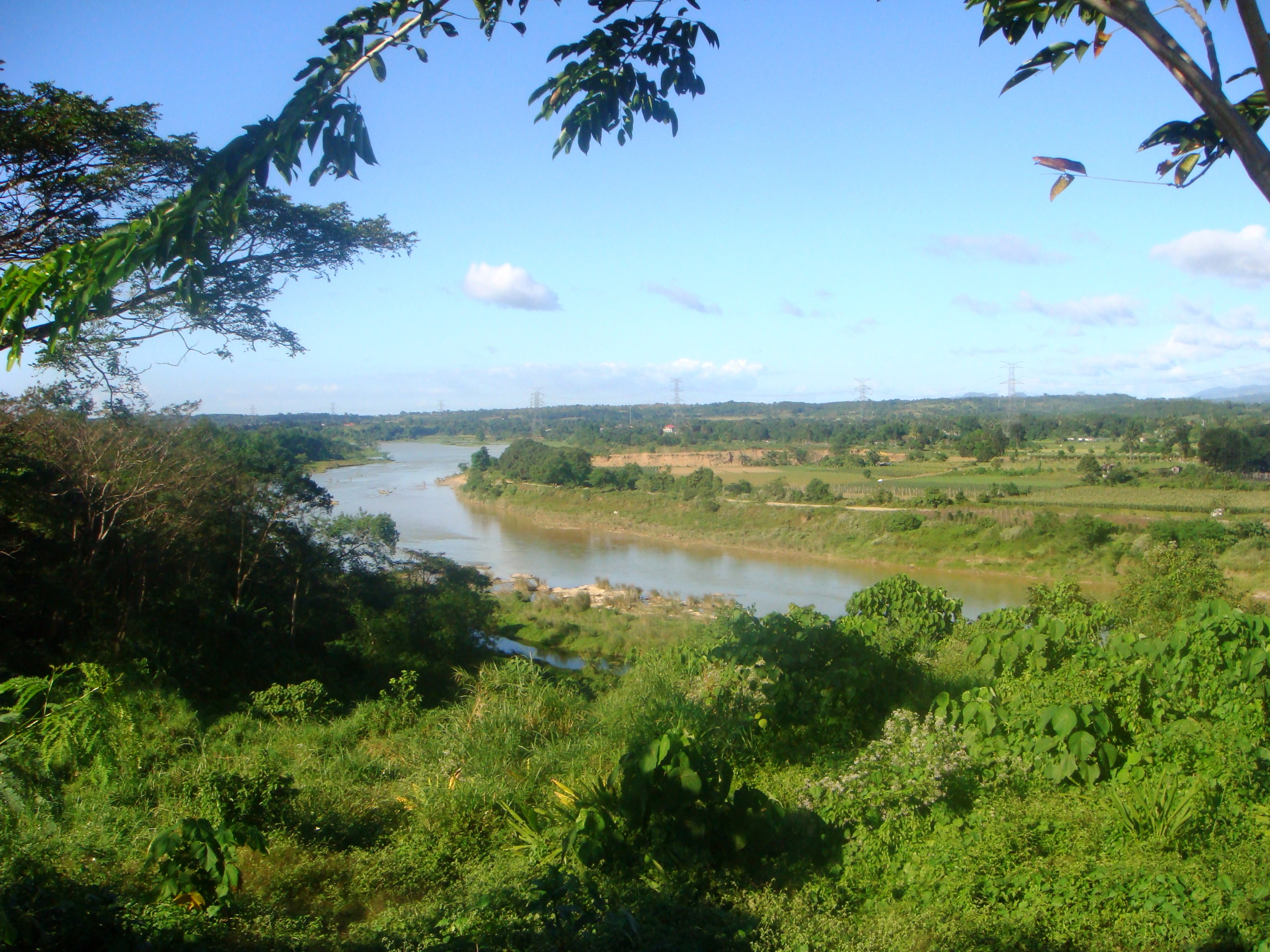
Angat River from overlooking view

== Notable people ==
- Ella Cruz - actress
- Nicolas Capistrano – lawyer, politician and revolutionary general
- Elenita Binay - physician, former mayor of Makati.
