= Doña Remedios Trinidad =

Municipality in Bulacan, Philippines

- Municipality
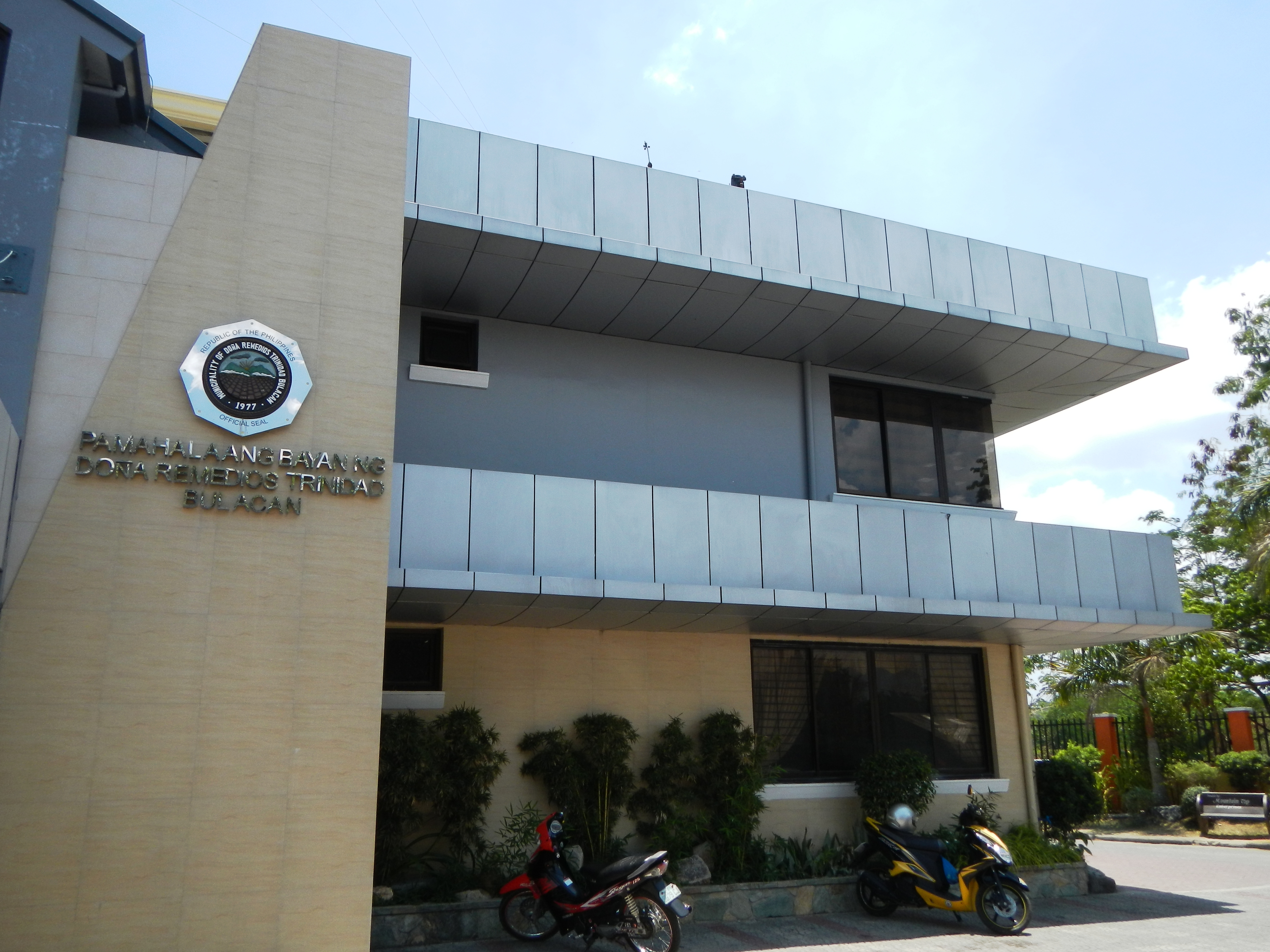
- Municipal Hall

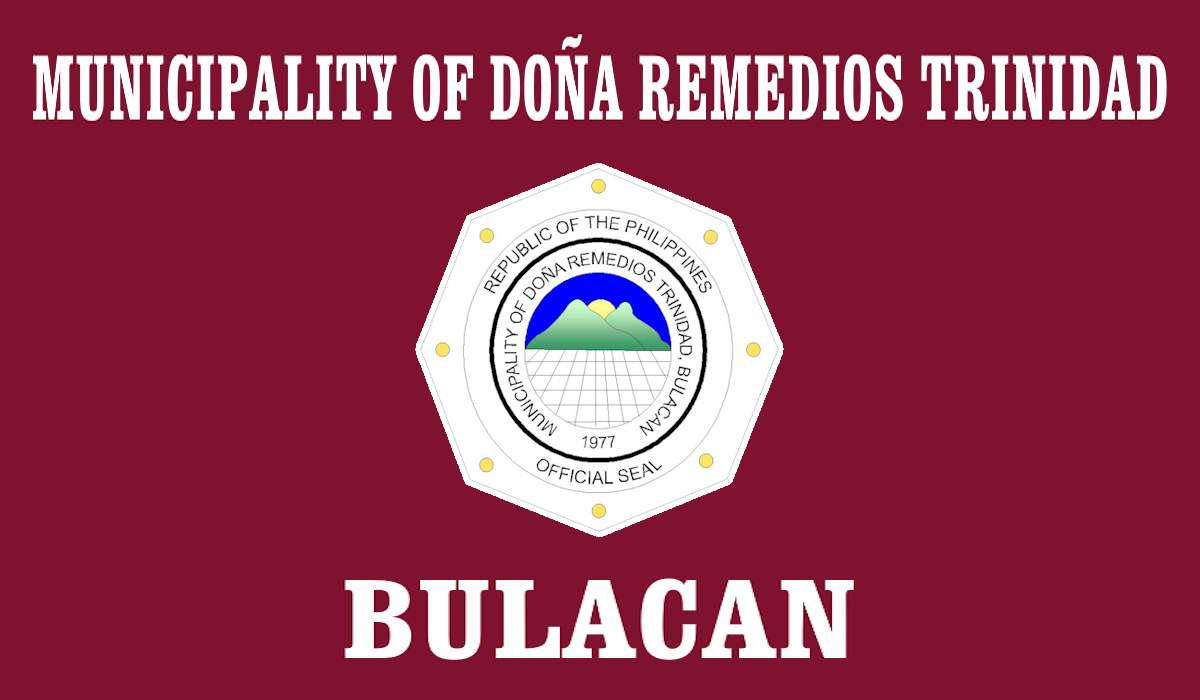
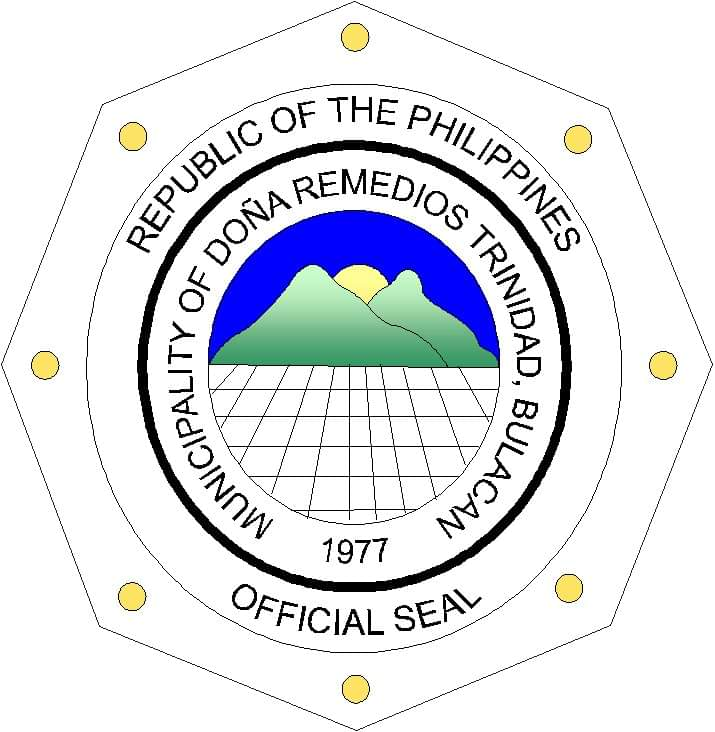
- Flag Seal
- Anthem: DRT Hymn
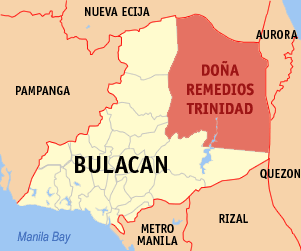
- Map of Bulacan with Doña Remedios Trinidad highlighted
- Interactive map of Doña Remedios Trinidad
- Location within the Philippines
- Coordinates: 15°00′N 121°05′E
- Country: Philippines
- Region: Central Luzon
- Province: Bulacan
- District: 3rd district
- Founded: September 13, 1977
- Named for: Remedios Romualdez (mother of Imelda Marcos)
- Barangays: 8 (see Barangays)

Government
  - Type: Sangguniang Bayan
  - Mayor: Ronaldo T. Flores
  - Vice Mayor: Marita L. Flores
  - Representative: Mark Cholo I. Violago
  - Municipal Council: Members: Felizardo C. Esquivel; Romeo S. Santiago; Jayvie C. Manalo; William S. Piadozo; Lorna V. Carpio; Alex C. Sarmiento; Guillermo E. Santos; Gino V. San Pedro
  - Electorate: 28,375 voters (2025)

Area
  - Total: 932.96 km^{2} (360.22 sq mi)
- Elevation: 205 m (673 ft)
- Highest elevation: 666 m (2,185 ft)
- Lowest elevation: 46 m (151 ft)

Population (2024 census)
  - Total: 30,064
  - Density: 32.224/km^{2} (83.461/sq mi)
  - Households: 7,059

Economy
  - Income class: 1st municipal income class
  - Poverty incidence: 38.9% (2023)
  - Revenue: ₱ 415.3 million (2024)
  - Assets: ₱ 1,315 million (2024)
  - Expenditure: ₱ 359.8 million (2024)
  - Liabilities: ₱ 282.1 million (2024)

Utilties
  - Electricity: Manila Electric Company (Meralco)
- Time zone: UTC+8 (PST)
- ZIP code: 3009
- PSGC: 0301424000
- IDD : area code: +63 (0)44
- Native languages: Tagalog; Southern Alta
- Website: drtbulacan.gov.ph

Doña Remedios Trinidad, officially the Municipality of Doña Remedios Trinidad (Tagalog: Bayan ng Doña Remedios Trinidad), known by its acronym as DRT, is a municipality in the province of Bulacan, Philippines. According to the 2024 census, it has a population of 30,064 people, making it the least populated municipality in the province.

== Etymology ==
The town was named by President Ferdinand Marcos after Remedios Trinidad Romuáldez, mother of his wife, First Lady Imelda Romualdez Marcos, whose family was from Baliuag, Bulacan.

== History ==
On September 13, 1977, during martial law, President Ferdinand Marcos issued Presidential Decree No. 1196, creating the municipality of Doña Remedios Trinidad as a gift to his wife's family. The municipality covers seven barangays: Pulong Sampaloc and Camachile from Angat; Bayabas and Kabayunan from Norzagaray; and Talbac, Camachin and Kalawakan from San Miguel.

Historians have noted that Marcos named towns after people with little historical significance, and only family ties as an actual reason. Some locals have also called for a renaming of the town to honor actual heroes from Bulacan.

On the afternoon of December 4, 2000, Mayor Paulino Esteban was being driven in his Nissan Patrol by his 19-year-old nephew Jim Venturina and accompanied by police escort Teofilo Avellanosa when they were shot and killed by gunmen in Barangay Baybay, Angat, Bulacan.

== Geography ==
Doña Remedios Trinidad is the largest municipality in Bulacan, occupying almost one-third of the total land area of the province. It lies on the southern edge of the Sierra Madre mountain range, and partially embraces three major conservation areas: the Angat Watershed Forest Reserve, Biak-na-Bato National Park, and Doña Remedios–General Tinio Watershed Forest Reserve, comprising 327.3 km^{2} (126.4 sq mi) of alienable and disposable public land.

Doña Remedios Trinidad is bordered by Norzagaray, Bulacan to the south; by General Nakar, Quezon and Dingalan, Aurora to the east; San Rafael, Angat, San Ildefonso, and San Miguel to the west; and Gapan and General Tinio, Nueva Ecija to the north. It is 53 kilometres (33 mi) from Malolos and 60 kilometres (37 mi) from Manila.

=== Topography ===
List of highest peaks in Doña Remedios Trinidad by elevation:

- Mount Sumag - 3,173 ft (967 m)
- Mount Tanawan - 2,949 ft (899 m)
- Mount Silad - 2,871 ft (875 m)
- Mount Sumacbao - 2,733 ft (833 m)
- Mount Palanas - 1,923 ft (586 m)
- Mount Lumot - 1,785 ft (544 m)
- Mount Mabio - 1,453 ft (443 m)
- Mt. Susungdalaga - 1,332 ft (406 m)
- Mount Silid - 1,322 ft (403 m)
- Balistada Hill - 978 ft (298 m)
- Digos hill - 665 ft (203 m)
- Mount Gola - 656 ft (200 m)
- Tila Pilon Hills - 590 ft (180 m)
- Mount Manalmon - 584 ft (178 m)

=== Waterfalls ===
List of waterfalls in Dona Remedios Trinidad:

- Verdivia Falls
- Secret Falls
- Talon ni Eva Falls
- Talon Lucab Falls
- Talon Pedro falls
- Talon Pari Falls
- 13th Falls
- Zamora Falls

=== Rivers ===
- Balaong River
- Madlum River
- Puning River

=== Barangays ===
Doña Remedios Trinidad is politically subdivided into 8 barangays, as shown in the matrix below. Each barangay consists of puroks and some have sitios.

PSGC	Barangay	Population			±% p.a.	
		2024		2010		
031424001	Bayabas	5.2%	1,575	1,302	▴	1.33%
031424002	Kabayunan	5.8%	1,745	1,570	▴	0.74%
031424003	Camachin	3.5%	1,043	1,170	▾	−0.79%
031424004	Camachile	13.9%	4,166	3,433	▴	1.35%
031424005	Kalawakan	23.0%	6,909	5,632	▴	1.43%
031424006	Pulong Sampalok (Poblacion)	9.5%	2,859	2,666	▴	0.49%
031424007	Talbak	5.8%	1,746	1,528	▴	0.93%
031424008	Sapang Bulak	8.7%	2,620	2,577	▴	0.11%
	Total		30,064	19,878	▴	2.91%

=== Climate ===
Climate data for Doña Remedios Trinidad, Bulacan
Month	Jan	Feb	Mar	Apr	May	Jun	Jul	Aug	Sep	Oct	Nov	Dec	Year
Mean daily maximum °C (°F)	27 (81)	28 (82)	30 (86)	32 (90)	31 (88)	30 (86)	29 (84)	28 (82)	28 (82)	29 (84)	29 (84)	27 (81)	29 (84)
Mean daily minimum °C (°F)	17 (63)	18 (64)	20 (68)	21 (70)	23 (73)	23 (73)	23 (73)	23 (73)	23 (73)	22 (72)	21 (70)	20 (68)	21 (70)
Average precipitation mm (inches)	6 (0.2)	4 (0.2)	6 (0.2)	17 (0.7)	82 (3.2)	122 (4.8)	151 (5.9)	123 (4.8)	124 (4.9)	99 (3.9)	37 (1.5)	21 (0.8)	792 (31.1)
Average rainy days	3.3	2.5	11.7	6.6	17.7	22.2	25.2	23.7	23.2	17.9	9.2	5.2	168.4
Source: Meteoblue

== Demographics ==
Population census of Doña Remedios Trinidad
Year	Pop.	±% p.a.
1980	4,759	—
1990	8,614	+6.11%
1995	11,194	+5.03%
2000	13,636	+4.32%
2007	19,086	+4.75%
2010	19,878	+1.49%
2015	22,663	+2.53%
2020	28,656	+5.06%
2024	30,064	+1.16%
Source: Philippine Statistics Authority

In the 2020 census, the population of Doña Remedios Trinidad was 28,656 people, with a density of 31 inhabitants per square kilometre or 80 inhabitants per square mile.

Doña Remedios Trinidad is the least populated of all the municipalities and cities of Bulacan, with less than one percent of the province's population.

=== Languages ===
The municipality, along with two other municipalities (San Miguel and Norzagaray) and one city (San Jose del Monte) of Bulacan, is the homeland of the Alta Kabulowan, the first inhabitants of Bulacan, whose language is also called Alta Kabulowan. Their language is currently endangered and is in dire need of local government intervention. The majority of residents in the town are native speakers of the Tagalog language.

== Economy ==
Poverty incidence of Doña Remedios Trinidad (%)

Source: Philippine Statistics Authority

Doña Remedios Trinidad is a mainly agricultural town. Agricultural products, such as pineapples, are the main source of income of the town and its residents.

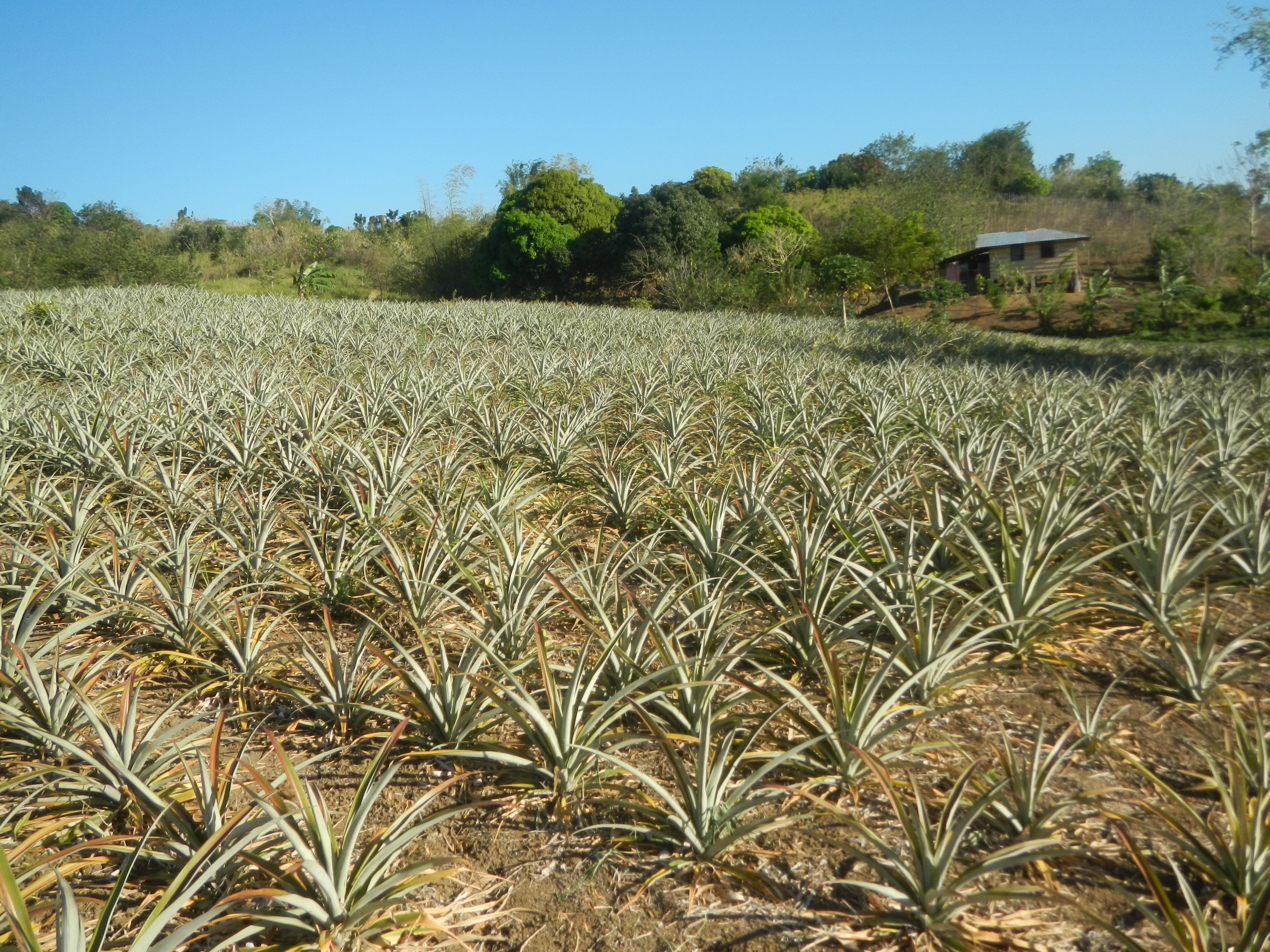
Pineapple plantation in Barangay Talbak

== Local Government ==
2025-2028 Doña Remedios Trinidad, Bulacan Officials
Position	Name	Party
Mayor	Ronaldo T. Flores	NUP
Vice Mayor	Marita L. Flores	NUP
Councilors	Guillermo E. Santos	NUP
Councilors	Felizardo C. Esquivel	NUP
Councilors	Romeo S. Santiago	NUP
Councilors	Jherome A. Manalo	NUP
Councilors	Alex C. Sarmiento	NUP
Councilors	Rogelio C. Resigurado Jr.	NUP
Councilors	Lorna V. Carpio	NUP
Councilors	Teresita S. Evangelista	NUP
Ex Officio Municipal Council Members
ABC President	TBD	Nonpartisan
SK Federation President	TBD	Nonpartisan

== Education ==
The Doña Remedios Trinidad Schools District Office governs all educational institutions within the municipality. It oversees the management and operations of all private and public, from primary to secondary schools.

One of the main secondary schools in DRT is the Laura De Leon Halili High School, located in Barangay Pulong Sampaloc. Most of the students in this school come from three barangays of DRT (Pulong Sampaloc, Camachile, and Bayabas) and some from the adjacent barangay of Banaban in Angat. The San Ildefonso-based Bulacan Agricultural State College opened a branch campus as Bulacan Agricultural State College-DRT located in Barangay Sapang Bulak.

=== Primary and elementary schools ===
- Alejandro E. Flores Sr. Elementary School
- Baras-Bakal Elementary School
- Basyo Elementary School
- Bato Elementary School
- Bayabas Elementary School
- Cabayunan Elementary School
- Cucong Elementary School
- Calumpit Elementary School
- Camachile Elementary School
- Camachin Elementary School
- Duplas Elementary School
- Durumugan Elementary School
- Kambubuyugan Elementary School
- Kalawakan Elementary School
- Kalayaan Elementary School
- Kalayakan Elementary School
- Kawit Elementary School
- Pinag-anakan Elementary School
- Pulong Sampaloc Elementary School
- Sapang Bulac Elementary School
- St. Bernadette Parochial Mission School
- Talamsi II Elementary School
- Talbak Elementary School
- Talamsi I Elementary School (Talamsi Primary School)

=== Private Primary and elementary schools ===
- St. Dominic de Guzman School Inc. DRT Extension

=== Secondary schools ===
- Esteban Paulino High School
- Kalayakan High School
- Laura De Leon Halili High School
- Sapang Bulac High School
- Talbak High School

=== Secondary schools Private ===
- Saint Bernadette Parochial Mission School

== Gallery ==
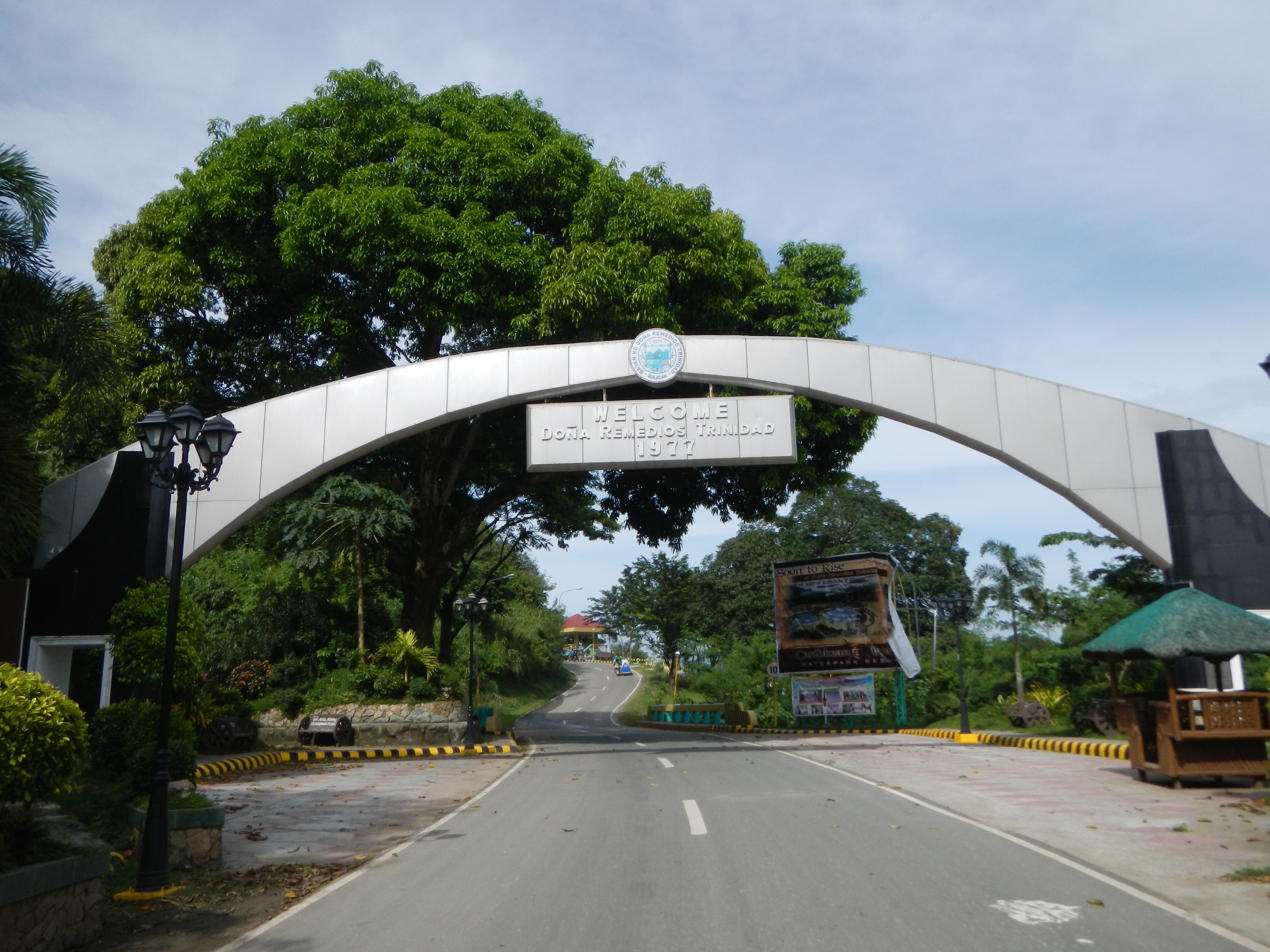
D.R.T. Welcome Arch

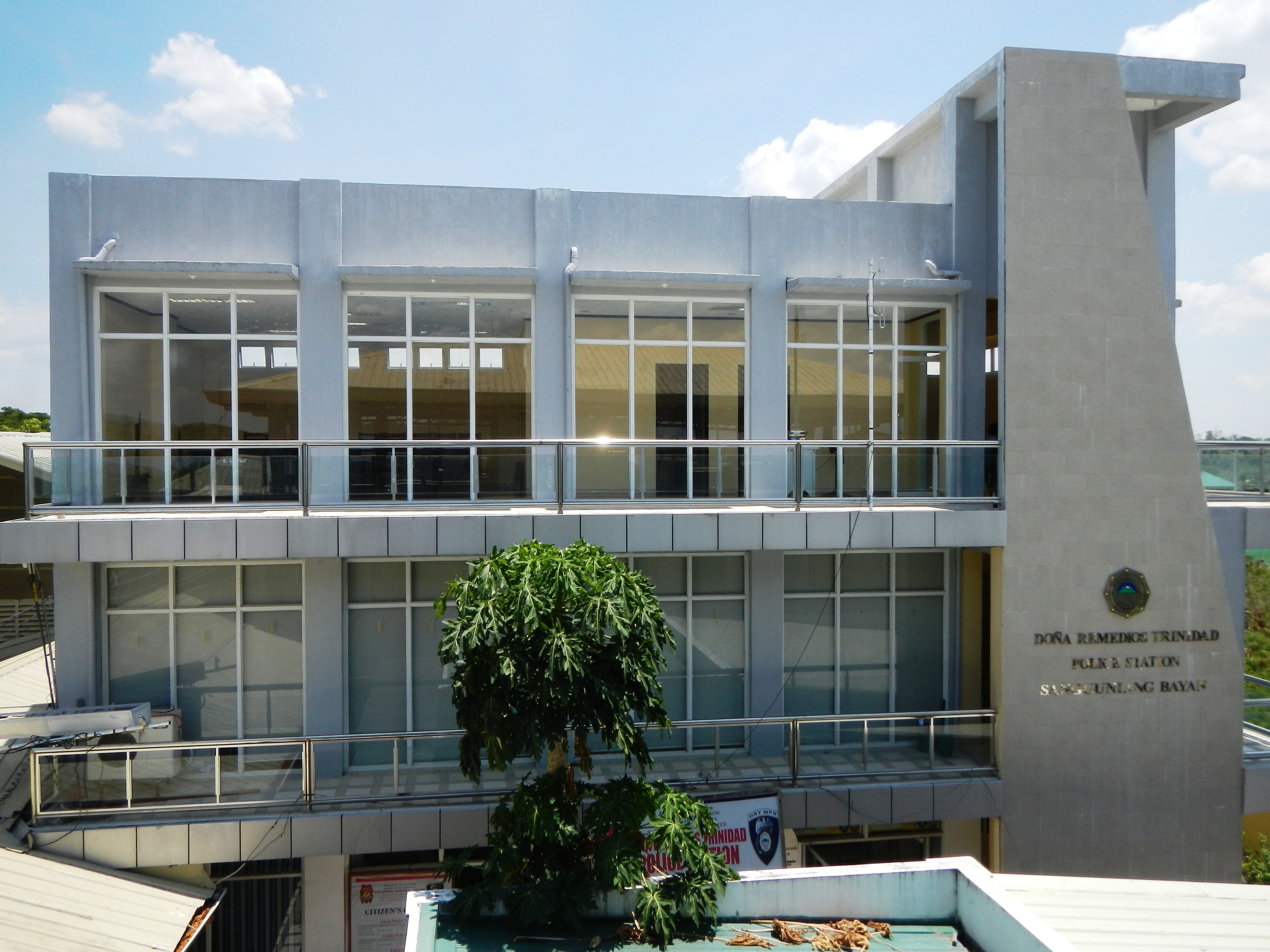
D.R.T. Police Station and Office of the Sangguniang Bayan

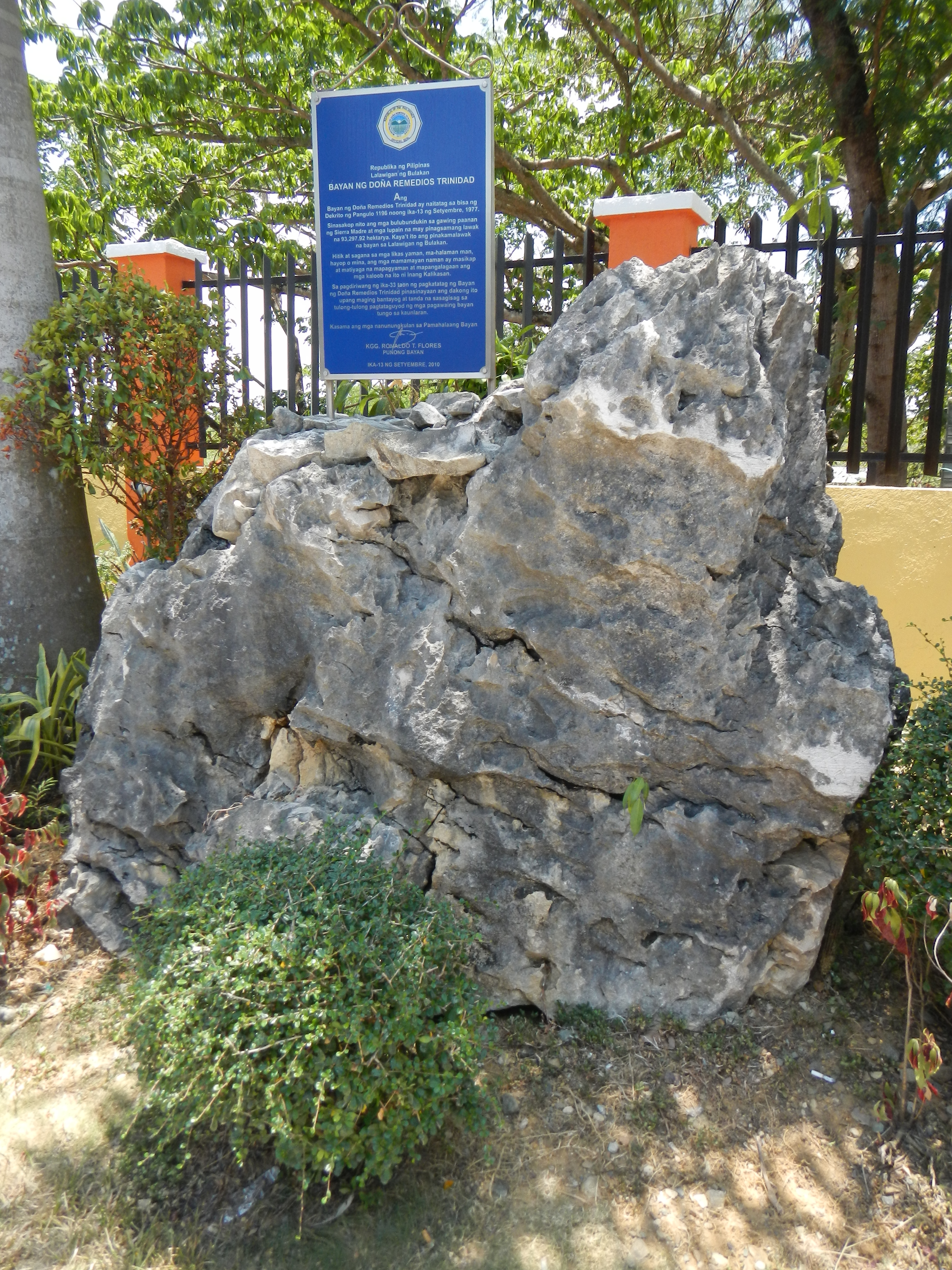
D.R.T.'s 33rd year founding anniversary marker

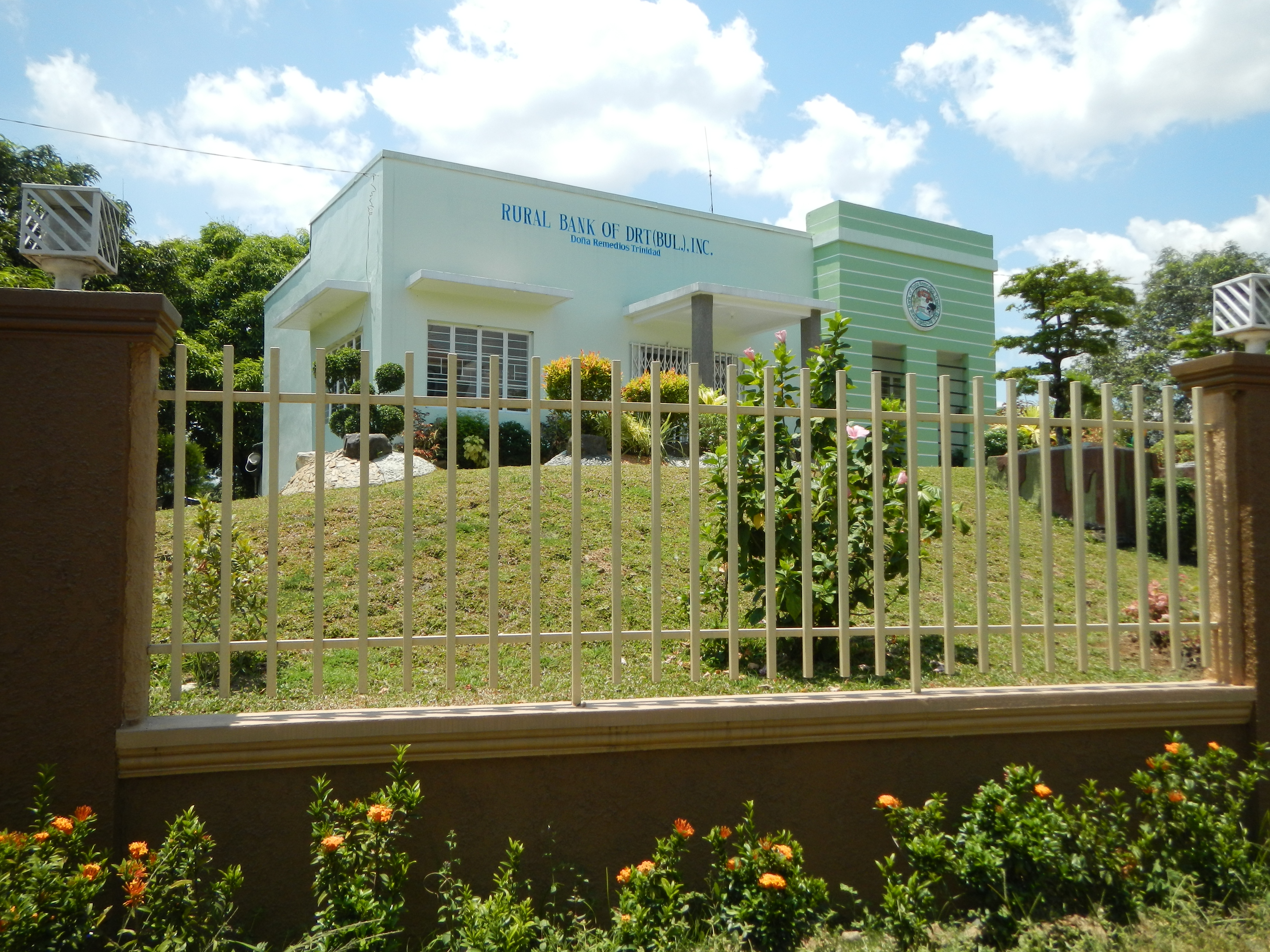
Rural Bank of D.R.T., Inc.

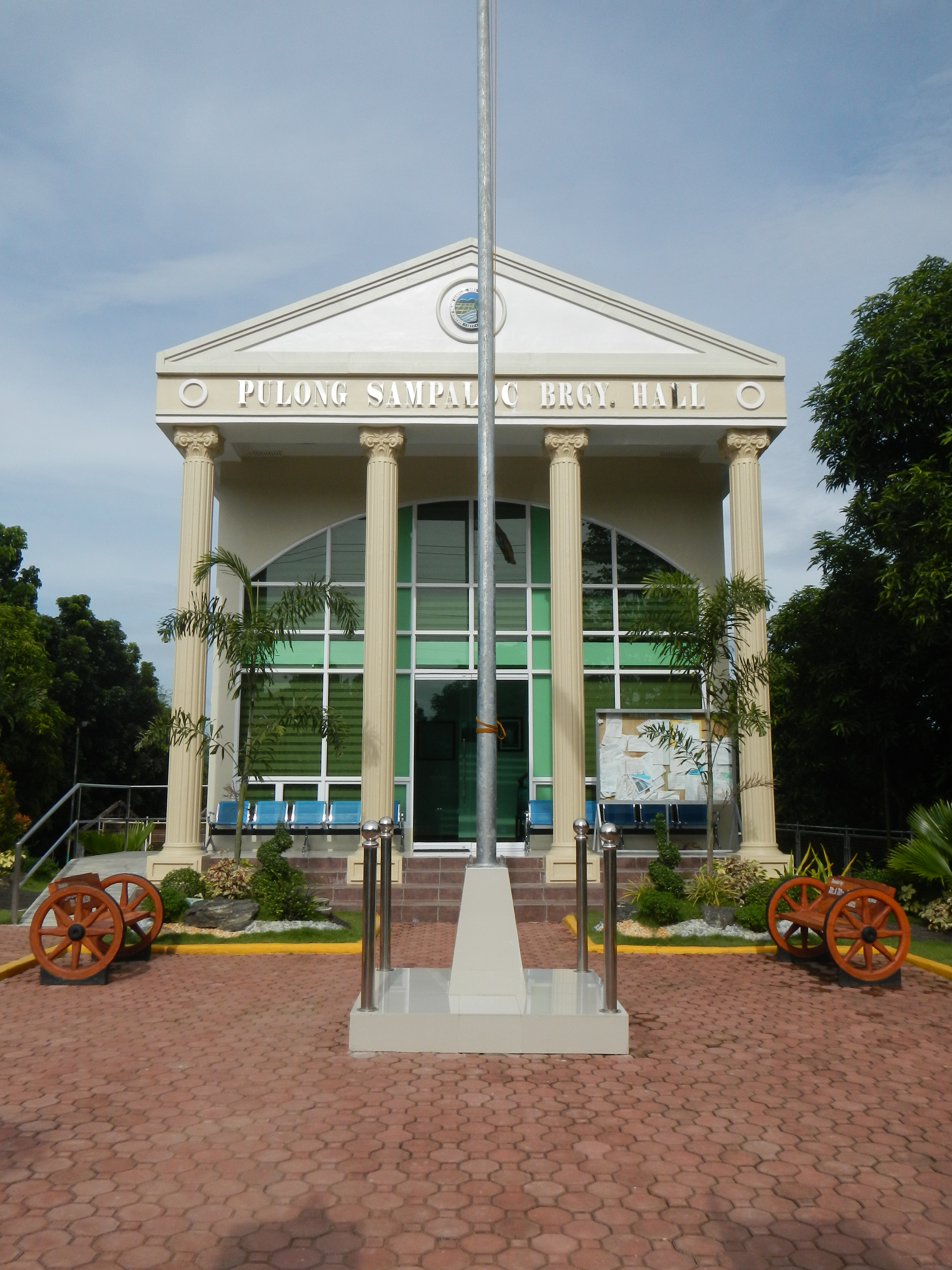
Pulong Sampaloc Barangay Hall

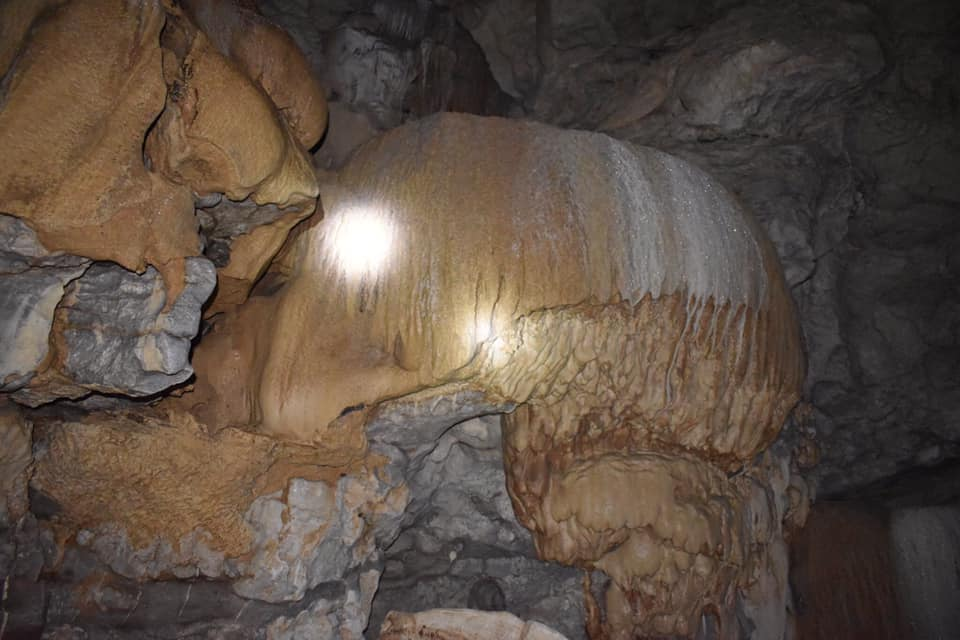
Puning Cave
