= Balagtas Church =

Catholic church in Bulacan, Philippines

- Diocesan Shrine and Parish of St. Lawrence, Deacon and Martyr
- Ang Simbahan ng Parokya ni San Lorenzo, Diyakono at Martir (Filipino); La Iglesia Parroquial de San Lorenzo de Roma, Diácono y Mártir (Spanish); Ecclesiæ Paroecialis Balagtas in hon. Sancti Laurentii, Diaconi et Martyris Roma (Latin)
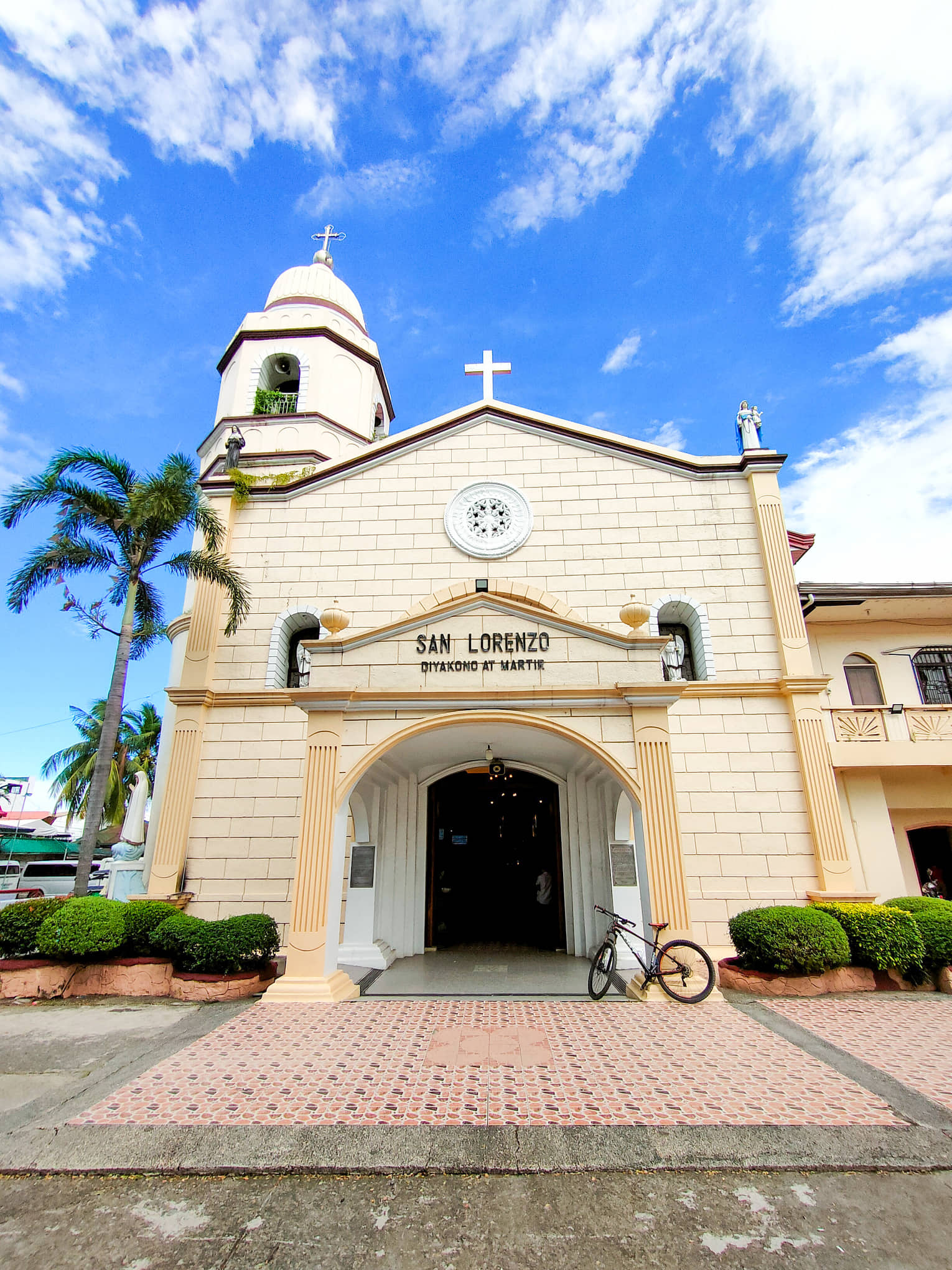
- The church's façade in 2023
- Balagtas Church
- 14°49′05″N 120°54′29″E
- Location: Wawa, Balagtas, Bulacan
- Country: Philippines
- Denomination: Catholic
- Sui iuris church: Latin Church
- Tradition: Roman Rite

History
- Status: Parish church
- Founded: May 12, 1596; 430 years ago
- Founder: Augustinian Friars
- Dedication: Saint Lawrence
- Consecrated: June 12, 2018; 8 years ago, by Most Rev. Honesto Ongtioco, D.D.
- Events: List: *Principal Patronal Feast (August 10); *Secondary Patronal Feast in honor of Virgen de la Consolacion y Correa de Balagtas (3rd Sunday of September)

Architecture
- Functional status: Active
- Architectural type: Church building
- Style: Baroque, Neo-Romanesque
- Completed: Before 1738

Specifications
- Materials: Stone, concrete, steel, brick

Administration
- Metropolis: Manila
- Diocese: Malolos
- Deanery: Saint Martin of Tours

Clergy
- Bishop(s): Most Rev. Dennis Villarojo, D.D.: Fr. Josefino Sebastian

The Diocesan Shrine and Parish Church of Saint Lawrence of Rome, Deacon and Martyr, commonly known as the Balagtas Church (Filipino: Simbahan ng Balagtas), is an 18th-century Baroque Roman Catholic parish church in the municipality of Balagtas in the Philippines, dedicated to Saint Lawrence, one of the most venerated Roman martyrs, celebrated for his Christian valor.

The said parish is under the pastoral jurisdiction of the Roman Catholic Diocese of Malolos. The incumbent pastor is Monsignor Angelito Juliano Santiago, who assumed pastoral governance of the church on 11 February 2021. He is also the Vicar Forane of the Vicariate of St. Martin of Tours - Bocaue in the Episcopal Eastern District of the Diocese, since 22 July 2024.

== History ==
=== Parish history ===
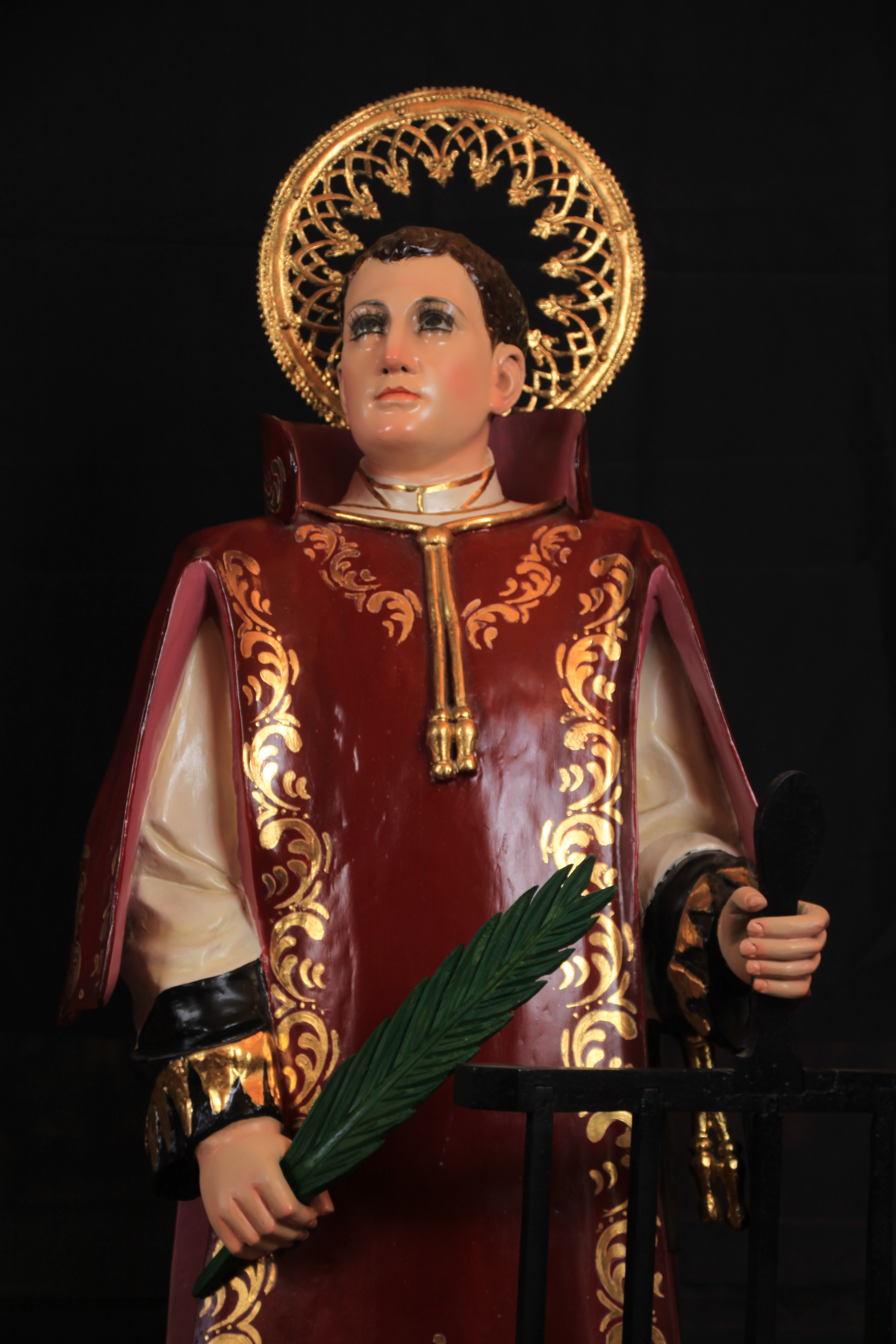
Altar Statue of St. Lawrence of Rome (Photo by PSLDM SocCom)

Balagtas, originally referred to as Caruya and later renamed to Bigaa by the mid-1600s, was accepted by the Augustinian Friars as a convent under the patronage of Saint Lawrence on May 12, 1596. Father Francisco de Campos and Father Andres de Cordoba were named priests of Balagtas the same year. The convent of Guiguinto was frequently annexed to the convent of Balagtas due to the former's poor economic status. Guiguinto was first annexed to Balagtas in 1607. By 1612, Balagtas was reported to be an independent with two visitas and 2,400 parishioners. Its catchment population decreased when one of its barrio-visita, Casay, separated to form a new parish. In 1639, Balagtas was declared a vicariate.

The then-named town of Bigaa was then part of the Archdiocese of Manila under the Vicariate of Bulacan until the establishment of the new Bulacan Diocese of Malolos in 1961, promulgated by Pope John XXIII through the Apostolic Constitution Christi fidelium. On June 18, 1966, Bigaa was renamed into Balagtas, honoring the renowned Filipino poet and writer, Francisco Balagtas, who was born and raised in the town.

In September 2026, the Diocese of Malolos approved the elevation of the parish church into a diocese shrine, that would be formally inaugurated scheduled for march of 2027.

==== Renovation, Rededication and Consecration ====
In December 2013, the parish received its new pastor in the person of Fr. Leocadio De Jesus, who was then transferred from his pastoral governance in the Pulilan Church. The then Bishop of Malolos, Jose Francisco Oliveros requested him to have the church to be on its 'more dignifying image,' seeing the situation of the church building on its 'aging stage.'

During the incumbency of de Jesus, adhering to the bishop's request, the parish initiated a fundraising campaign for the renovation of the church starting in mid-2014. The renovation formally began in 2016 and was executed by Vitreartus Liturgical Arts. While the works are on its way, liturgical services of the parish were temporarily held on a makeshift church in the church's patio for almost three years. Upon the partial completion of the works, the church was re-opened in 2017 for occasional use, and then closed once again for the final phase of renovation works.

Currently, the Parish has its two son-parishes. Namely, the Parish Church of St. Peter the Apostle in Barangay Borol Segundo and the Parish Church of St. Joseph the Worker in Barangay Panginay.

=== Architectural history ===
Balagtas had its first parochial structures made of light materials long before 1645, the year when it was reported to have sustained heavy damage from an earthquake. The convent of Balagtas must have experience financial instability since it was reported that it took the priests of Balagtas months before the structures can be repaired. The exact date of the construction of the present church cannot be pointed out clearly although some sources suggest that it was built a few years after 1805, the year when a church was reportedly built on Balagtas’ former town site, now known as Bigaang Matanda. Father Manuel Buceta, minister of Balagtas in 1738, 1751 and 1754 repaired the church and built a new convent. Another earthquake damaged the church in 1880. Between 1893 and 1898, the church and convent were repaired, the bell tower was erected under the supervision of Father Francisco Martin Giron. The church underwent a series of renovations especially in the early 1960s.

== Architecture ==
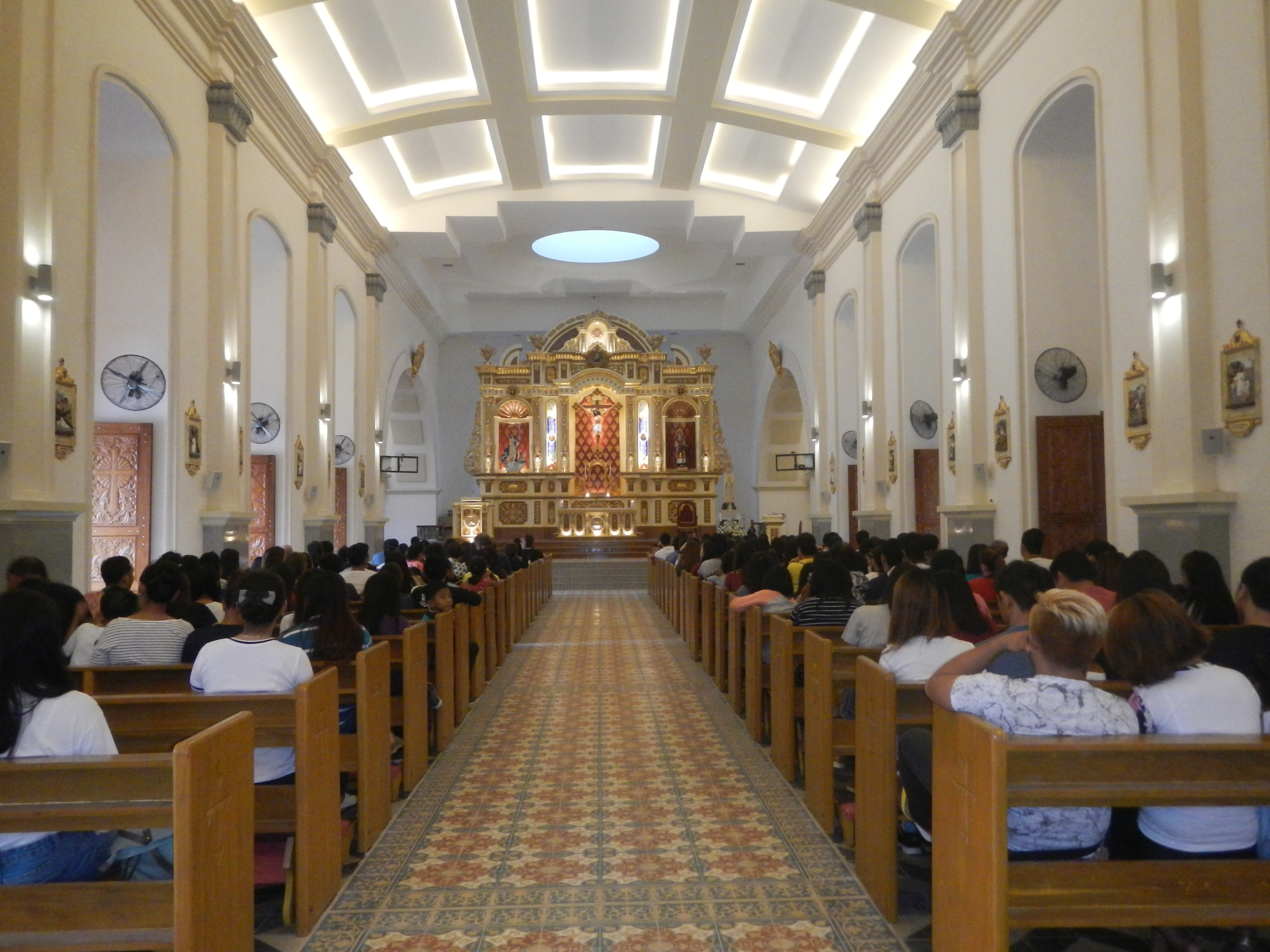
Church interior in 2018

The most striking features of the church façade are the recessed arch dominating much of the front of the church and the absence of pilasters dividing the façade into several segments. Above and beside the arch are semicircular arch windows and a rose window that allow the entry of light to the choir loft inside. The two semicircular arch windows also act as niches holding figures of angels. The entire façade has been plastered with cement and was laid out with patterns mimicking the original stone wall. A concrete porte-cochere topped with onion-shaped finials was a later addition. Attached to the right of the church is a three-level octagonal bell tower.
