= Andrew Kim (disambiguation) =

Andrew Kim is an American intelligence officer.

Andrew Kim may also refer to:

- Andy Kim (born 1982), American politician
- Andrew Kim Taegon (1821-1846), Catholic saint of Korean clergy
- Shrine of Saint Andrew Kim, in Bulacan, Philippines
