= Bocaue =

Municipality in Bulacan, Philippines

Bocaue Bokawe
- Municipality
- Municipality of Bocaue
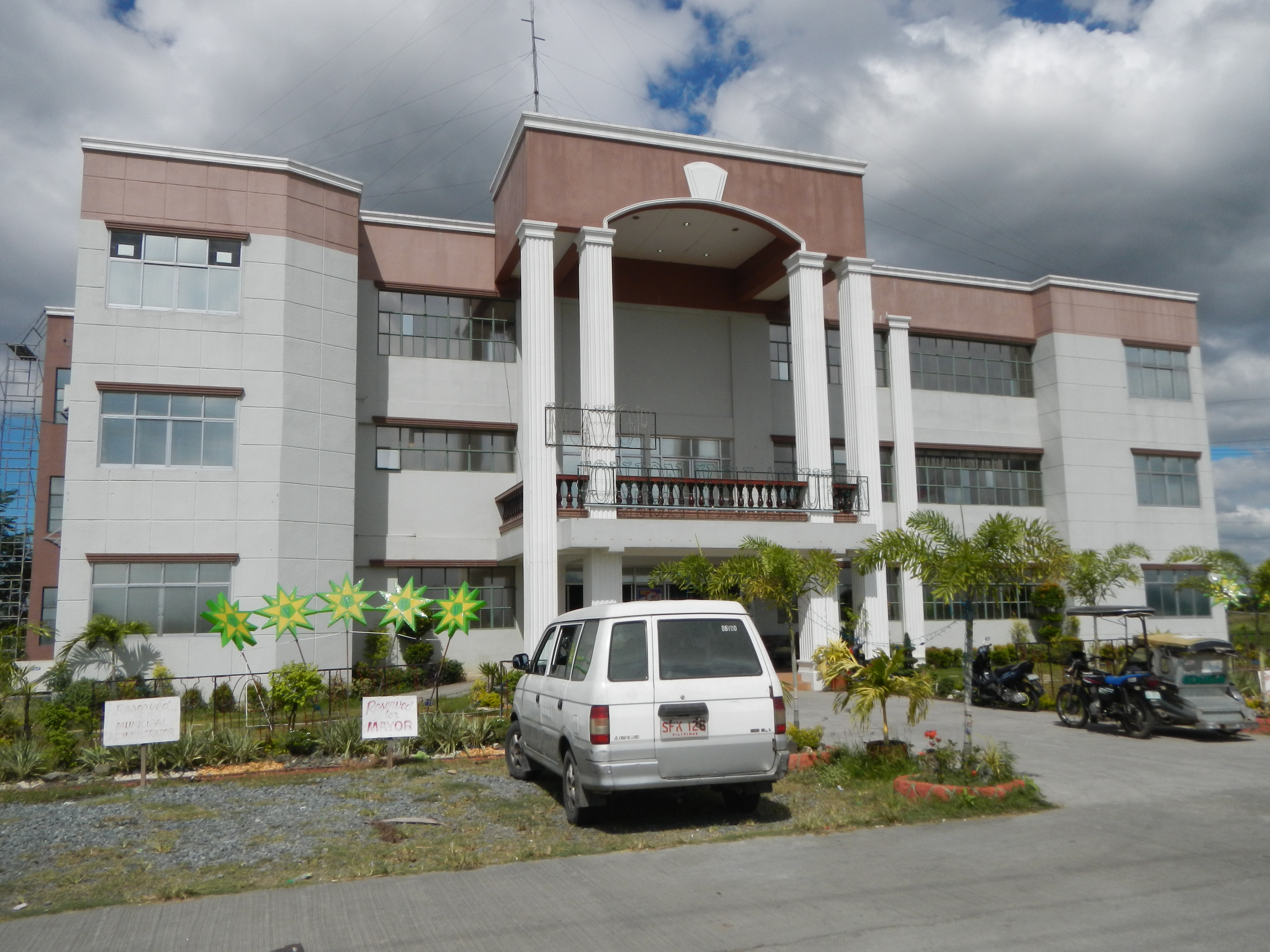
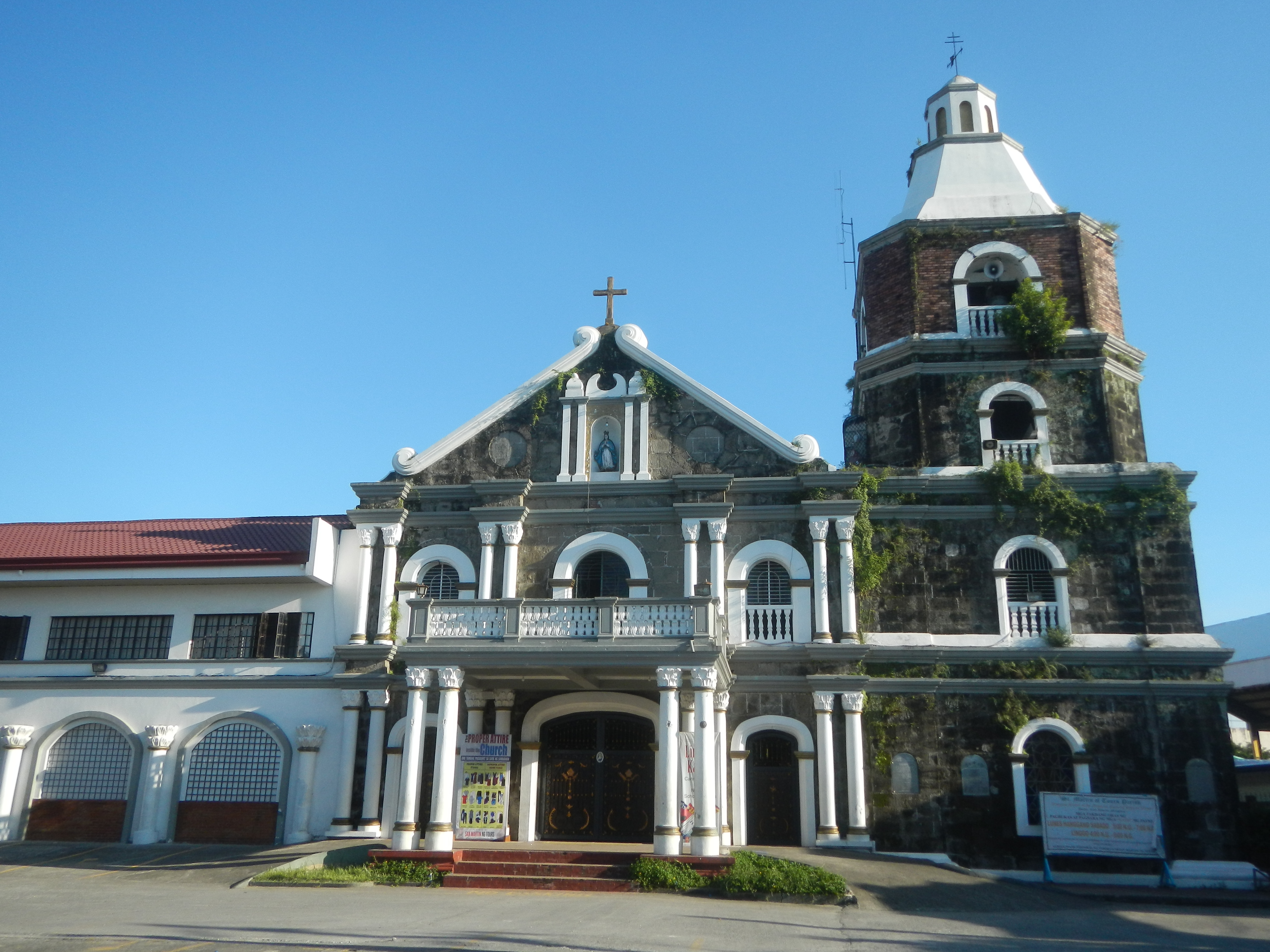
- From the top, left to right: Shrine of Saint Andrew Kim, Bocaue Municipal Hall, Saint Martin of Tours Parish Church, Philippine Arena

- Seal
- Nickname: Fireworks Capital of the Philippines
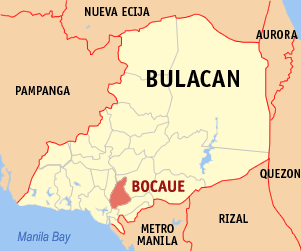
- Map of Bulacan with Bocaue highlighted
- Interactive map of Bocaue
- Location within the Philippines
- Coordinates: 14°48′N 120°56′E
- Country: Philippines
- Region: Central Luzon
- Province: Bulacan
- District: 5th district
- Founded: 1582 (as a barrio of Meycauayan)
- Chartered: April 11, 1606 (as an independent town)
- Annexation to Bigaa: October 8, 1903
- Restored: November 20, 1903
- Founded by: Dayang Panginuan; Fray Juan de Plasencia, OFM
- Barangays: 19 (see Barangays)

Government
  - Type: Sangguniang Bayan
  - Mayor: Eduardo J. Villanueva Jr.
  - Vice Mayor: Sherwin N. Tugna
  - Representative: Agatha Paula A. Cruz
  - Municipal Council: Members: Jamel Charisse G. Mendoza; Alvin Paul SP. Cotaco; Josef Andrew T. Mendoza; Jerome P. Dela Cruz; Mirasol P. Bautista; Aristotle L. Nieto; Donnabel M. Celestino; Francis Jerome G. Reyes
  - Electorate: 80,501 voters (2025)

Area
  - Total: 31.87 km^{2} (12.31 sq mi)
- Elevation: 9.0 m (29.5 ft)
- Highest elevation: 40 m (130 ft)
- Lowest elevation: −4 m (−13 ft)

Population (2024 census)
  - Total: 147,755
  - Density: 4,636/km^{2} (12,010/sq mi)
  - Households: 34,682
- Demonyms: Bocaueño (male); Bocaueña (female)

Economy
  - Income class: 1st municipal income class
  - Poverty incidence: 12.04% (2023)
  - Revenue: ₱ 618.6 million (2024)
  - Assets: ₱ 687.6 million (2024)
  - Expenditure: ₱ 589.8 million (2024)
  - Liabilities: ₱ 21.78 million (2024)

Utilities
  - Electricity: Meralco
- Time zone: UTC+8 (PST)
- ZIP code: 3018
- PSGC: 0301404000
- IDD : area code: +63 (0)44
- Native languages: Tagalog

Bocaue [bɔˈkawɛ], officially the Municipality of Bocaue (Tagalog: Bayan ng Bocaue), is a municipality in the province of Bulacan, Philippines. According to the 2024 census, it has a population of 147,755 people.

Among its tourist attractions are a town museum located near the municipality's center and the town's river festival celebrated on the first Sunday of every July. The river festival is in commemoration of the Holy Cross of Wawa, believed to be miraculous by the town's predominantly Roman Catholic population.

== Etymology ==
The town's name comes from the Old Tagalog word "Bukawe", which refers to a type of long bamboo (Schyzostachyum lima).

== History ==
Bocaue was first established by Franciscan missionaries as a barrio and visita of Meycauayan in 1582 and as a town on April 11, 1606, under the advocacy of San Martin de Tours. It was the first town to be granted independence from the old Meycauayan that was then a very large town comprising the present territories of Meycauayan, Marilao, Santa Maria, San Jose del Monte, Obando, and Valenzuela City. The 1818 Spanish census recorded the area having 2,530 native families and 88 Spanish-Filipino families.

After the Philippine–American War, the Philippine Commission was established, part of whose functions was the reorganization of Philippine municipalities and provinces. In 1903, Bulacan province reduced the number of towns from 26 to 19. The town of Balagtas merged with Bocaue, with the former serving as the seat of government from October 8 to November 20 before it was transferred to the latter. Bocaue later regained its independence and was reestablished as a town in 1911.

During the Bocaue River Festival of July 2, 1993, around 500 people rode the "floating pagoda" for the Holy Cross of Wawa way beyond the boat's capacity and caused the boat to sink, killing more than two hundred people. Despite the lives lost, no one has been made accountable for the disaster. This incident became known as the Bocaue Pagoda Tragedy.

On December 31, 2007, ten fireworks stores burned in Barangay Turo, causing a series of explosions within the area and injuring seven people.

== Geography ==
Bocaue is 27 kilometers (17 mi) north-east of Manila if reached via the MacArthur Highway and is 18 kilometers (11 mi) from Malolos. It is at the mid-southwestern portion of Bulacan. Its land area is 3,187 hectares or 31.87 km^{2} (12.31 sq mi).

The town is bounded on the north by the municipality of Balagtas and a portion of the municipality of Santa Maria; by the municipalities of Marilao and Obando on the south; a larger portion of Santa Maria on the east; a portion of the municipality of Bulakan on the extreme southwestern side; and a portion of Balagtas on the western side.

Bocaue is traversed by the Bocaue River, a continuation of the confluence of Santa Maria River and San Jose River and a few other minor rivers and creeks, all of which are distributaries of the Angat drainage basin. The main source of Angat River and the Angat drainage basin, as well as their distributaries, is the Sierra Madre mountain range. Along these rivers are many man-made fish ponds used for raising and farming fish like bangus and tilapia.

Bocaue, along with Balagtas, Guiguinto, and Pandi, was once known as comprising the 2nd district of Bulacan. The grouping would later be known as the 5th district of Bulacan. With the continuous expansion of Metro Manila, Bocaue is part of Manila's built-up area which reaches San Ildefonso in its northernmost part. The Bocaue River runs through most of the municipality.

=== Barangays ===
Bocaue is politically subdivided into 19 barangays, as shown in the matrix below. Each barangay consists of puroks and some have sitios.

PSGC	Barangay	Population			±% p.a.	
		2024		2010		
031404001	Antipona	1.5%	2,289	2,298	▾	−0.03%
031404002	Bagumbayan	2.4%	3,573	2,187	▴	3.48%
031404003	Bambang	5.3%	7,830	9,072	▾	−1.02%
031404004	Batia	21.4%	31,663	19,561	▴	3.41%
031404005	Biñang 1st	2.4%	3,496	3,465	▴	0.06%
031404006	Biñang 2nd	1.4%	2,072	2,421	▾	−1.08%
031404007	Bolacan	0.8%	1,199	1,106	▴	0.56%
031404008	Bundukan	4.6%	6,796	6,668	▴	0.13%
031404009	Bunlo	3.2%	4,686	4,942	▾	−0.37%
031404010	Caingin	3.8%	5,551	5,253	▴	0.39%
031404011	Duhat	5.0%	7,444	7,094	▴	0.34%
031404012	Igulot	1.0%	1,408	1,468	▾	−0.29%
031404013	Lolomboy	11.2%	16,507	16,421	▴	0.04%
031404014	Poblacion	0.3%	405	786	▾	−4.51%
031404015	Sulucan	1.7%	2,572	2,715	▾	−0.38%
031404016	Taal	5.9%	8,681	8,520	▴	0.13%
031404017	Tambobong	3.8%	5,558	4,549	▴	1.41%
031404018	Turo	4.1%	6,058	6,000	▴	0.07%
031404019	Wakas	1.3%	1,887	1,881	▴	0.02%
	Total		147,755	106,407	▴	2.31%

=== Climate ===
Climate data for Bocaue, Bulacan
Month	Jan	Feb	Mar	Apr	May	Jun	Jul	Aug	Sep	Oct	Nov	Dec	Year
Mean daily maximum °C (°F)	29 (84)	30 (86)	32 (90)	34 (93)	33 (91)	31 (88)	30 (86)	29 (84)	29 (84)	30 (86)	30 (86)	29 (84)	31 (87)
Mean daily minimum °C (°F)	20 (68)	20 (68)	21 (70)	23 (73)	24 (75)	25 (77)	24 (75)	24 (75)	24 (75)	23 (73)	22 (72)	21 (70)	23 (73)
Average precipitation mm (inches)	7 (0.3)	7 (0.3)	9 (0.4)	21 (0.8)	101 (4.0)	152 (6.0)	188 (7.4)	170 (6.7)	159 (6.3)	115 (4.5)	47 (1.9)	29 (1.1)	1,005 (39.7)
Average rainy days	3.3	3.5	11.1	8.1	18.9	23.5	26.4	25.5	24.5	19.6	10.4	6.4	181.2
Source: Meteoblue

== Demographics ==
Population census of Bocaue
Year	Pop.	±% p.a.
1903	8,438	—
1918	8,749	+0.24%
1939	12,345	+1.65%
1948	16,537	+3.30%
1960	22,417	+2.57%
1970	33,953	+4.23%
1975	40,577	+3.64%
1980	49,693	+4.14%
1990	67,243	+3.07%
1995	69,718	+0.68%
2000	86,994	+4.86%
2007	105,817	+2.74%
2010	106,407	+0.20%
2015	119,675	+2.26%
2020	141,412	+3.58%
2024	147,755	+1.06%
Source: Philippine Statistics Authority

In the 2020 census, the population of Bocaue, Bulacan, was 141,412 people, with a density of 4,400 inhabitants per square kilometer or 11,000 inhabitants per square mile.

=== Religion ===
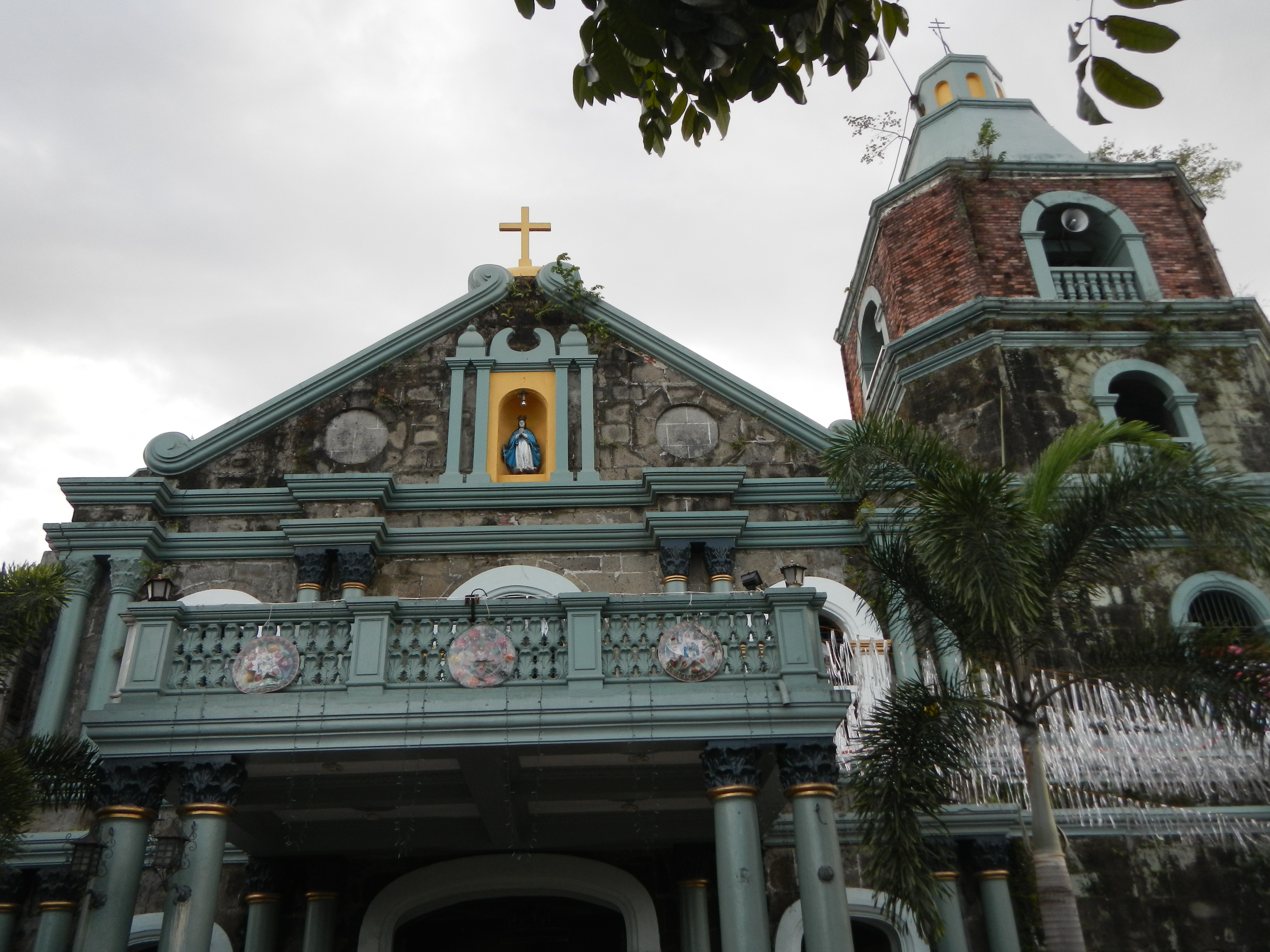
The St. Martin of Tours Parish Church

The new church building complex at the Shrine of Saint Andrew Kim in Barangay Lolomboy

The St Martin of Tours Church of Bocaue, otherwise known as The Diocesan Shrine of Bocaue, is one of the oldest churches in the province of Bulacan. The reputed Mahal na Krus ng Wawa (Beloved Holy Cross of Wawa) is kept here.

The Feast of the Holy Cross of Wawa is a festival held on the first Sunday of July, observed in honor of the Holy Cross of Wawa (Mahal na Krus sa Wawa), a relic believed to have saved the life of an old woman drowning in the Bocaue River. The main feature of this fiesta is the Pagoda, a gaily decorated structure riding on a huge bangka, which glides along the town river carrying people from all walks of life.

Other religious denominations in the town include Iglesia ni Cristo, JIL, Jehovah's Witness, Methodist, Aglipayan, Adventist, Baptist, and the Church of Jesus Christ of Latter-day Saints. There are also a number of Evangelical, Pentecostal, Members Church of God International and Charismatic churches, ministries, fellowships, and groups in the municipality. Muslims are also found in the municipality.

== Economy ==
Poverty incidence of Bocaue

Source: Philippine Statistics Authority

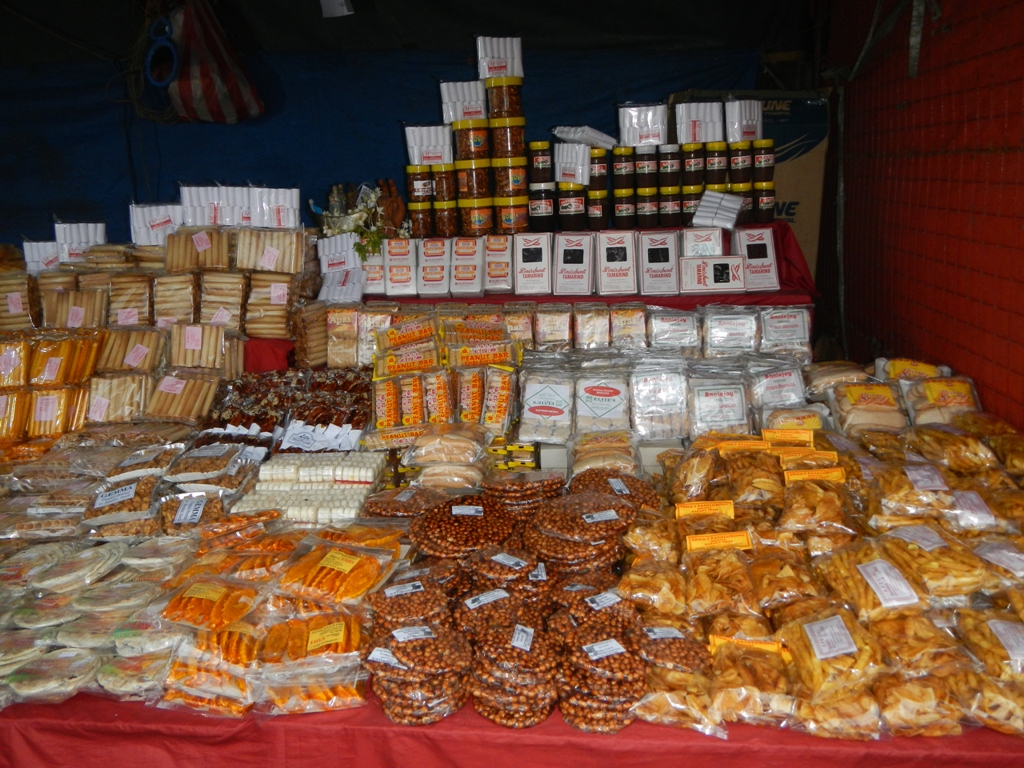
Locally made food products in a Bocaue store

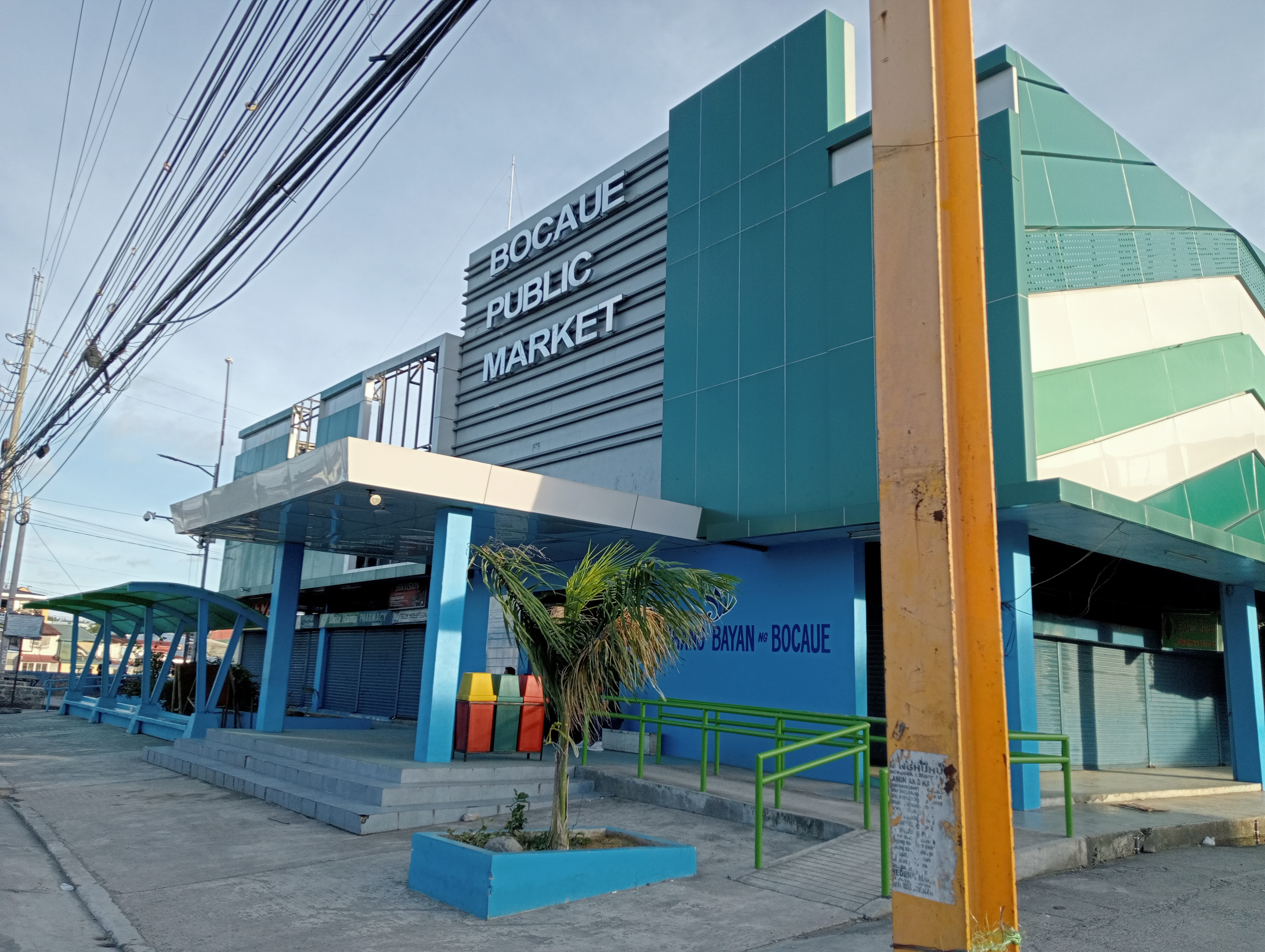
Bocaue Public Market

Bocaue's town center is 27 kilometers north of Manila if reached via the North Luzon Expressway (NLEX) and the Bocaue Exit (in Barangay Turo). NLEX provides fast transport to Metro Manila from where it begins at Mabalacat, Pampanga, and Bocaue is the expressway's middle route.

The town's major industry is fireworks-making, which has earned it the tag "Fireworks Capital of the Philippines".

== Sports and recreation ==
The Philippine Sports Stadium in Ciudad de Victoria, Bocaue.

The Philippine Stadium, also known as the New Era University Stadium, is a sports stadium located inside the Ciudad de Victoria, a 75-hectare tourism enterprise zone located in the towns of Bocaue and Santa Maria, Bulacan. With a capacity of up to 25,000, it became the biggest stadium in the Philippines upon its completion.

The Philippine Arena during the opening of the 2019 Southeast Asian Games.

The Philippine Arena, an indoor multi-purpose arena and the centerpiece of Ciudad de Victoria, is located just adjacent to the Philippine Stadium. With a seating capacity of 55,000 it became the largest indoor arena in the world upon its completion in 2014.

== Education ==
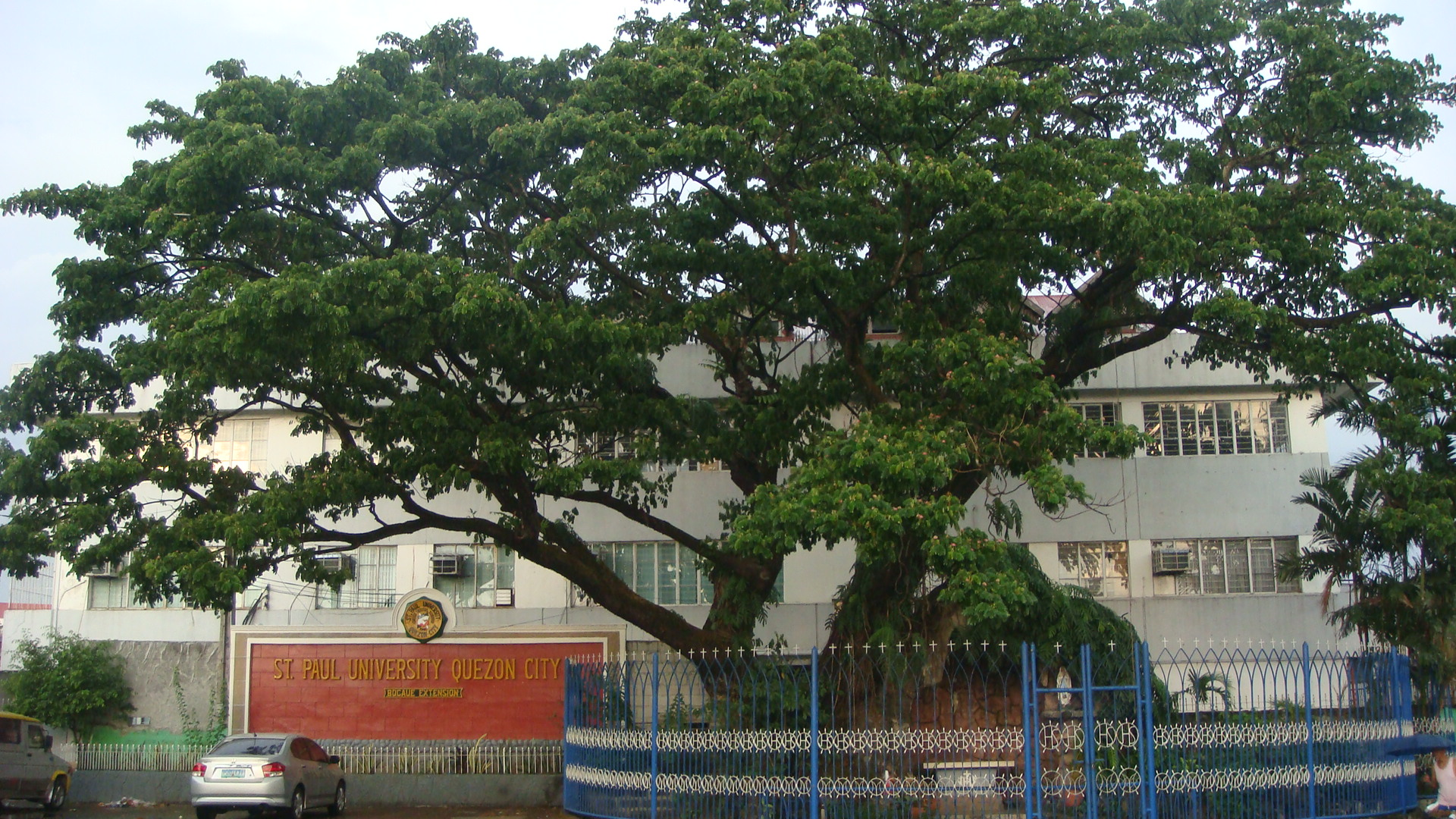
The Bocaue Extension building of the St. Paul University of Quezon City

The Bocaue Schools District Office governs all educational institutions within the municipality. It oversees the management and operations of all private and public, from primary to secondary schools.

Bocaue is also an education center for the Meycauayan, Marilao, Santa Maria, and Balagtas municipalities area. The state-owned Bulacan Polytechnic College has a campus in Bocaue. Private colleges and universities include the Dr. Yanga's Colleges and Jesus Is Lord Colleges Foundation Inc. New Era University and St. Paul University Quezon City also established branch campuses in the municipality. The municipality also has several elementary and secondary schools, both public and private.

=== Primary and elementary schools ===
- Academia de Sta. Cruz
- Bambang Elementary School
- Batia Elementary School
- Biñang Elementary School
- Bocaue Adventist Elementary School
- Bocaue Hills Elementary School
- Bolakan Elementary School
- Bunducan Elementary School
- Bunlo Elementary School
- Cong. Erasmo R. Cruz Memorial School (Bocaue Central School)
- Corinthian School
- Divine World Learning School
- Duhat Elementary School
- Friends of Jesus Christian School
- Lolomboy Elementary School
- Nehemiah Standard Academy
- Northville V Elementary School
- Our Lady of Fatima Academy
- St. Francis Lyceum
- St. Martha Elementary School
- Taal Elementary School
- Tambubong Elementary School
- Turo Elementary School

=== Secondary schools ===
- Batia High School
- Iluminada Mendoza-Roxas Memorial High School
- Integrated School of Montessori
- Lolomboy National National High School
- St. John Academy of Bayanihan
- Taal High School

=== Higher educational institutions ===
- Bulacan Polytechnic College
- Colegio de San Martin
- Dr. Yanga's Colleges, Inc.
- Jesus Is Lord Colleges Foundation
- Mt. Carmel College
- St. Paul College of Bocaue
- Sto. Niño Academy

== Government ==
=== Local government ===
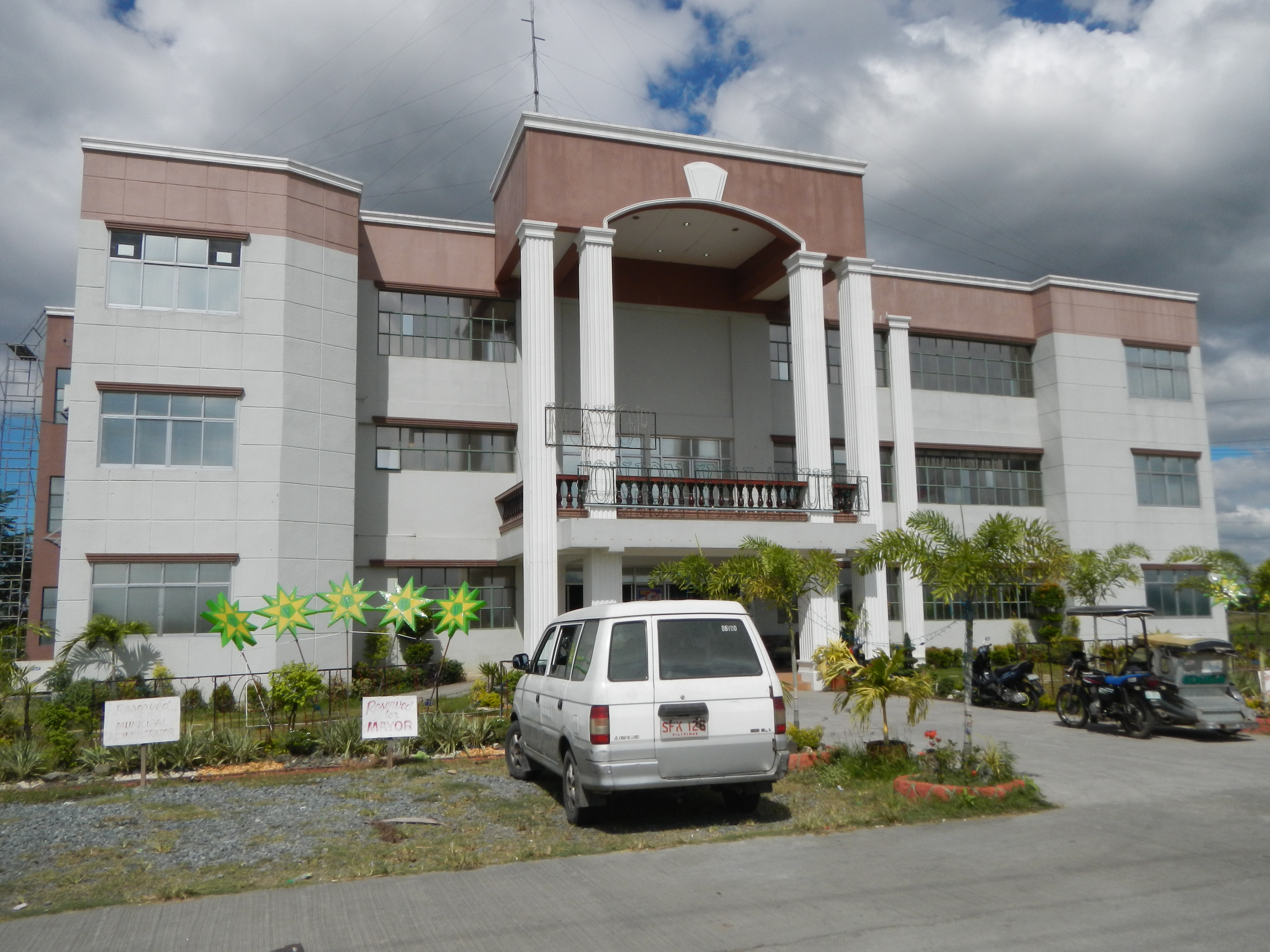
Bocaue Municipal Hall

Sangguniang Bayan (2025–2028)

Mayor	Party
Eduardo J. Villanueva Jr.	NUP
Vice Mayor	Party
Sherwin N. Tugna	NUP

Municipal Councilors:

Councilors	Party
Jamela Charisse G. Mendoza	NUP
Alvin Paul S. Cotaco	NUP
Josef Andrew T. Mendoza	NPC
Jerome P. Dela Cruz	NUP
Mirasol B. Bautista	NUP
Aristotle L. Nieto	NUP
Donnabel M. Celestino	Independent

=== Mayors of Bocaue ===
- Mariano Ramirez (1900)
- Gregorio de la Cruz (1901–1902)
- Vicente L. Enriquez (1902–1904)
- Victor Pascual (1904–1905)
- Lorenzo Galvez (1905–1907)
- Mariano Reyes (1908–1909)
- Dionisio Morales (1910–1912)
- Victor Pascual (1913–1916)
- Honorato Ramirez (1916–1919)
- Emiliano Eusebio (1919–1922)
- Guillermo Mendoza (1922–1928)
- Dominador L. Santos (1928–1933)
- Gregorio de Guzman (1934–1935)
- Emiliano Eusebio (1935–1937)
- Dominador L. Santos (1938–1940)
- Dioscoro M. Juan Sr. (1940–1941)
- Manolito Vistan (1942–1944)
- Joaquin San Juan (1944)
- Dioscoro M. Juan Sr. (1945–1948)
- Moises E. Nicolas (1948–1952)
- Evangelino Mendoza (1952–1956)
- Dioscoro M. Juan Sr. (1956–1960)
- Moises E. Nicolas (1960–1965)
- Simeon Mauricio (1965–1972)
- Matias B. Ramirez (1972–1979)
- Zacarias G. del Rosario (1979–1986)
- Ranulfo David (1986)
- Cesar N. Nicolas (1987–1988)
- Lorenzo P. Gonzales (1988–1992)
- Serafin M. de la Cruz (1992–1999)
- Jose D.G. Santiago Sr. (1999–2001)
- Eduardo J. Villanueva Jr. (2001–2004)
- Serafin M. de la Cruz (2004–2007)
- Eduardo J. Villanueva Jr. (2007–2016)
- Eleanor J. Villanueva-Tugna (June 30, 2016 – May 28, 2020)
- Jose C. Santiago Jr. (Acting mayor May 28, 2020-June 1, 2020, June 1, 2020 – June 30, 2022)
- Eduardo J. Villanueva Jr. (2022–present)

=== Vice Mayors of Bocaue ===
- Moises E. Nicolas (1956–1958)
- Cesar N. Nicolas (1986–1988)
- Serafin M. de la Cruz (1988–1992)
- Mario Mendoza (1992–1995)
- Antonio Mendoza (1995–1998)
- Rogelio Ramos (1998–2001)
- Peter Christopher Gonzales (2001–2004)
- Kennedy Valdez (2004–2007)
- Jose C. Santiago Jr. (2007–2013)
- Dioscoro Juan Jr. (2013–2016)
- Aldrin B. Sta. Ana (2016–2019)
- Jose C. Santiago Jr. (2019–2020)
- Alvin Paul S.P. Cotaco (2020–2022)
- Sherwin N. Tugna (2022–present)

== Notable personalities ==
- Francisca Reyes Aquino – choreographer and National Artist of the Philippines for Dance
- Lauro Delgado – actor
- Billy Mamaril – basketball player
- Noli Principe Manalang – painter
- Jonjon Mendoza – 32nd Governor of Bulacan and former Bulacan 3rd district representative
- Jewel Mische – actress
- Eddie Villanueva – evangelist and president-founder of Jesus Is Lord Church Worldwide; CIBAC party-list representative
- Joel Villanueva – incumbent Philippine senator
- Zaijian Jaranilla – Filipino actor and model having primary allegiance with ABS-CBN Corporation under Star Magic and secondary allegiance conditionally with other media companies (GMA Network and TV5 Network) who is best known for his role as the orphan Santino in the 2009–2013 ABS-CBN religious-themed teleserye, May Bukas Pa. He obtained Land Transportation Office (LTO) driving license in the municipality.
- Bryan Termulo – singer

== Gallery ==
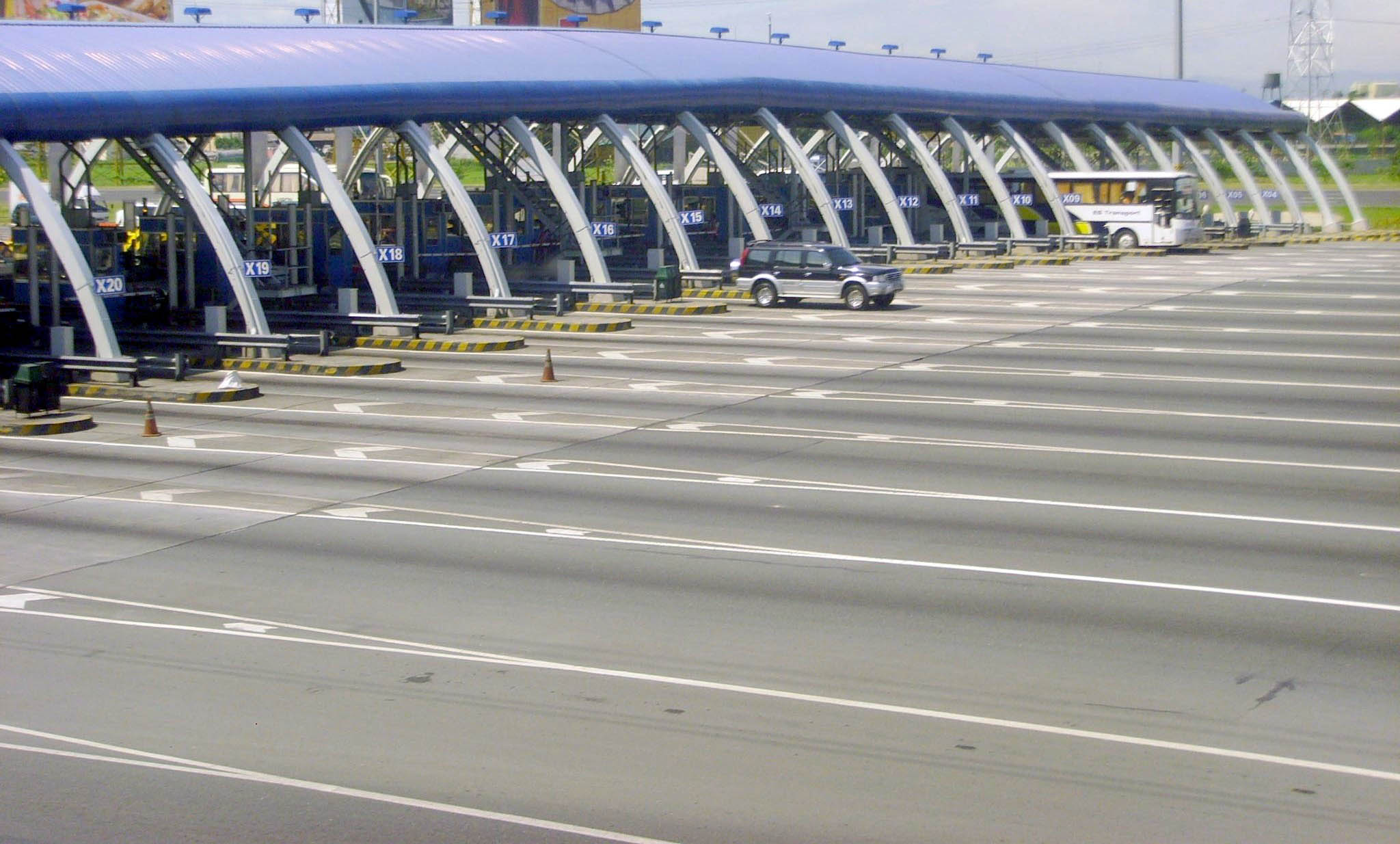
The Bocaue Toll Barrier of the NLEX.

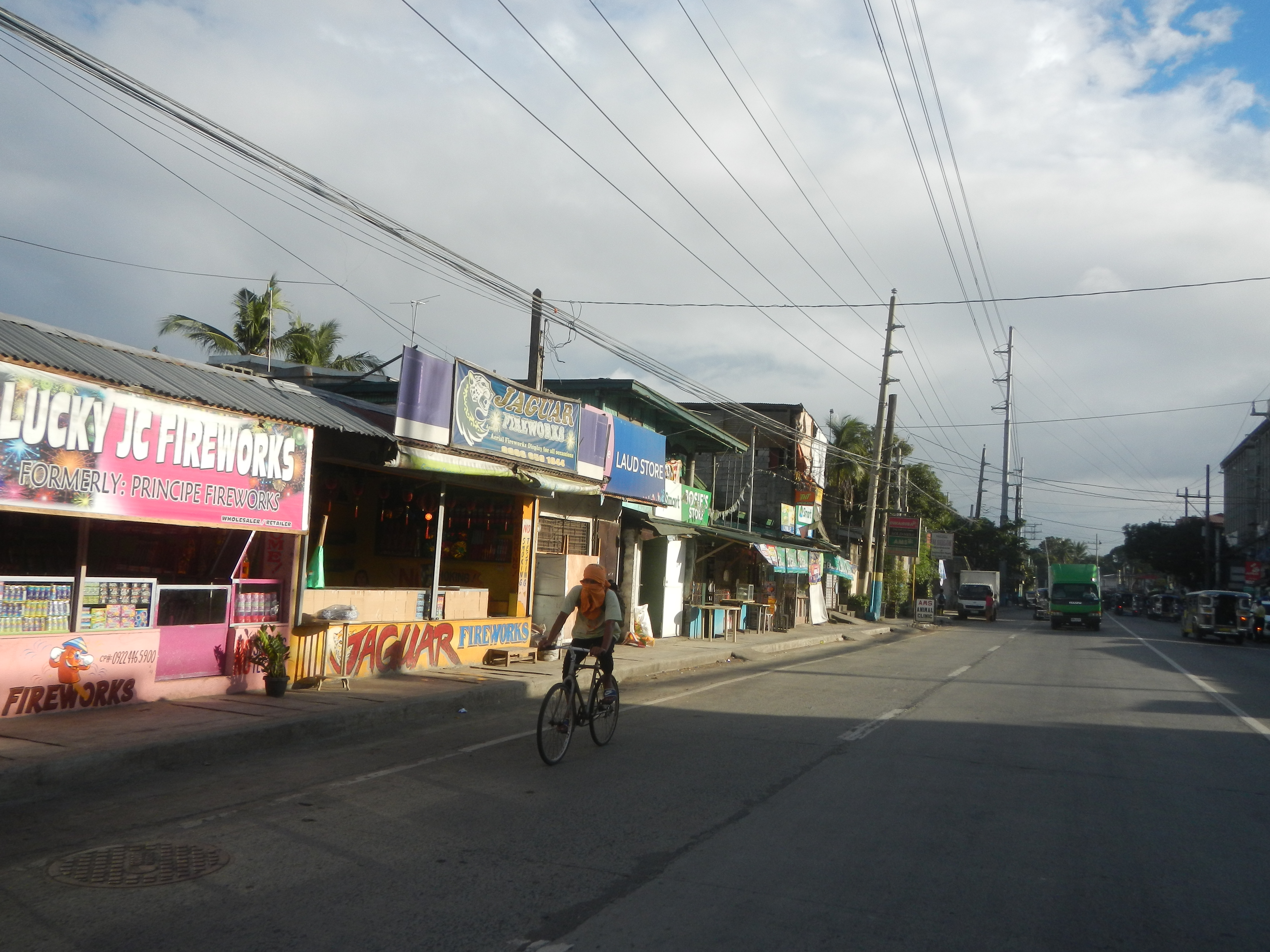
A fragment of the Bocaue fireworks shopping strip along MacArthur Highway.

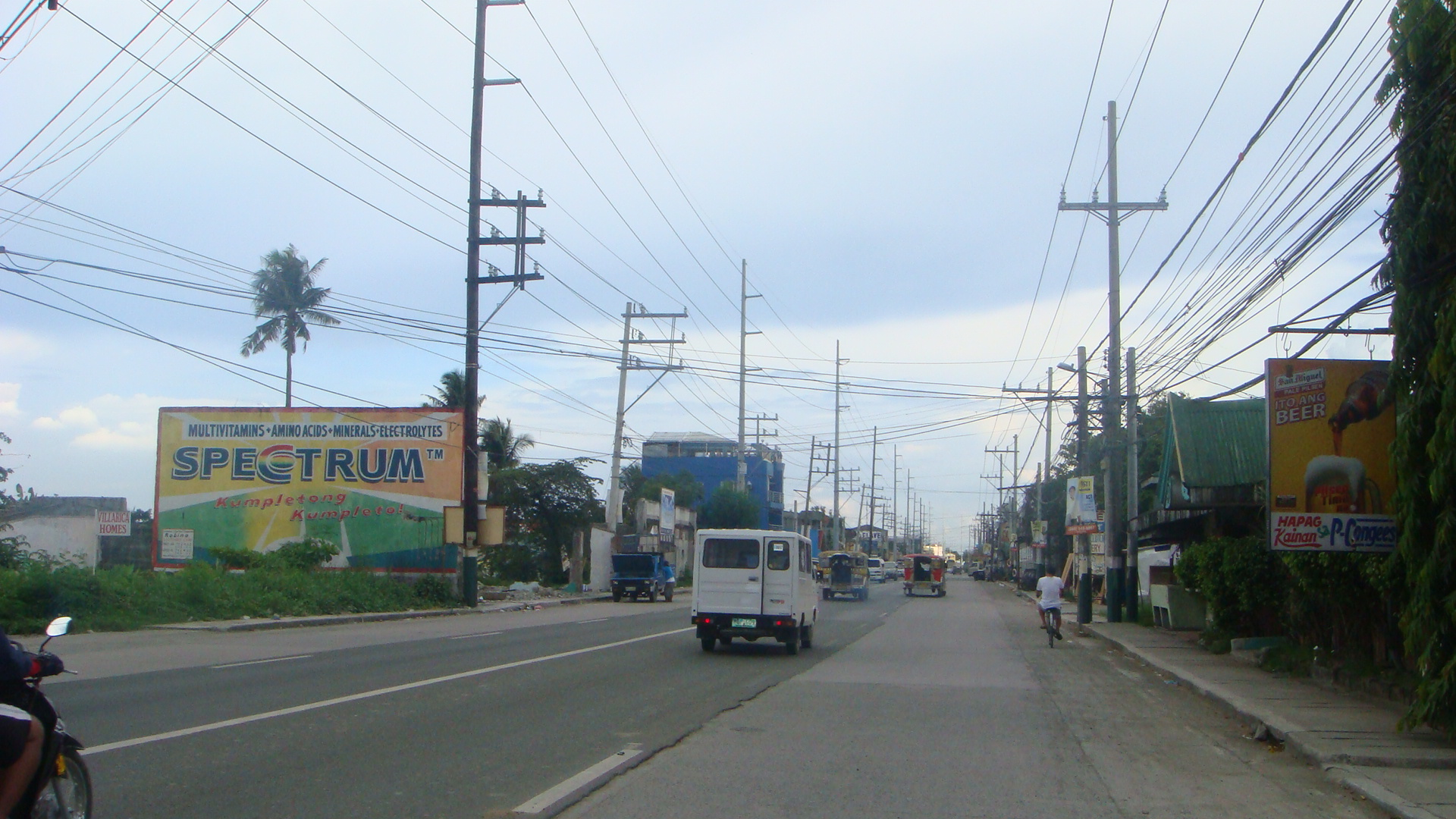
A part of the MacArthur Highway cutting across Barangay Lolomboy, Bocaue towards Marilao.

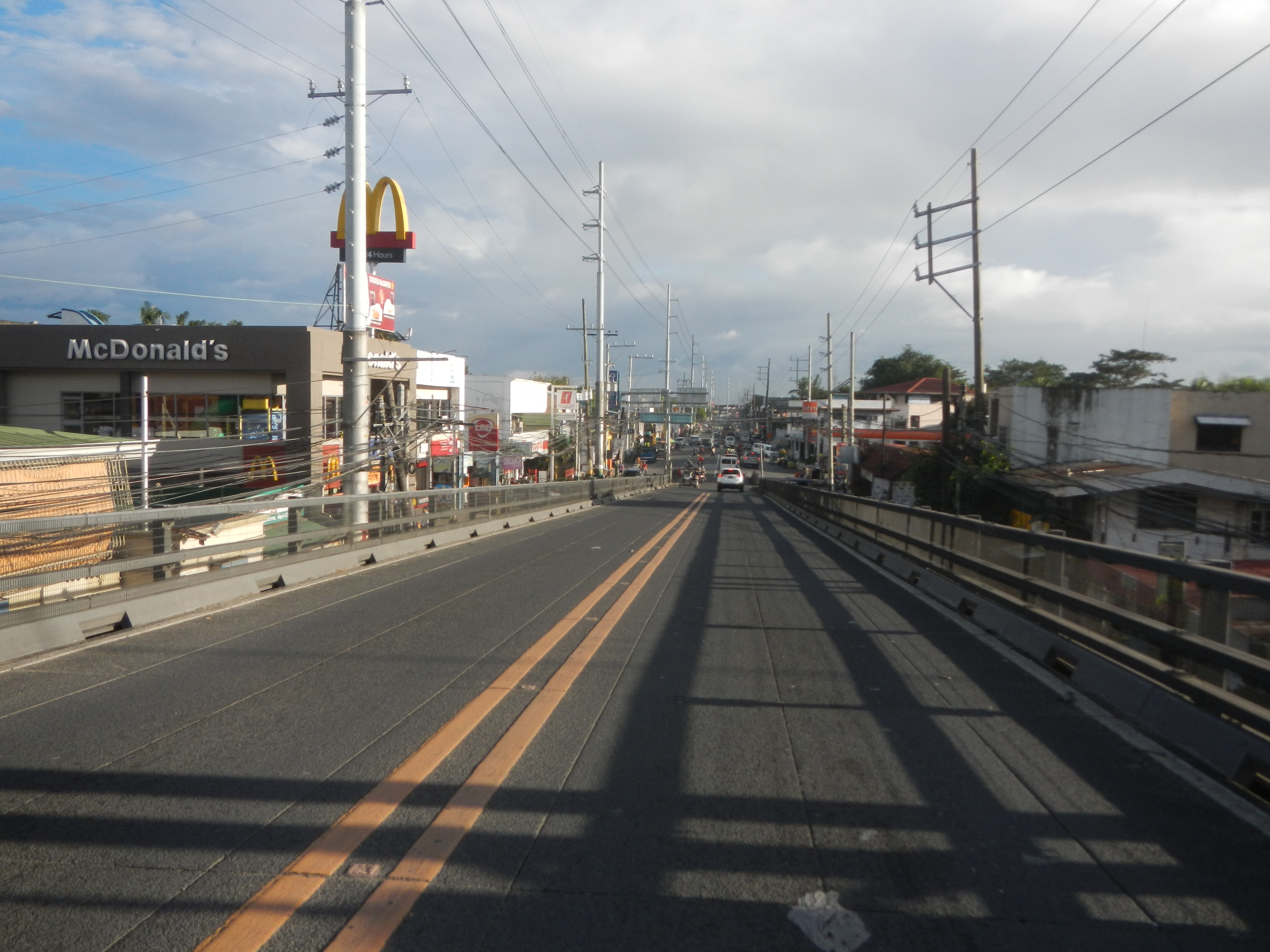
View from MacArthur Highway's Bocaue flyover.

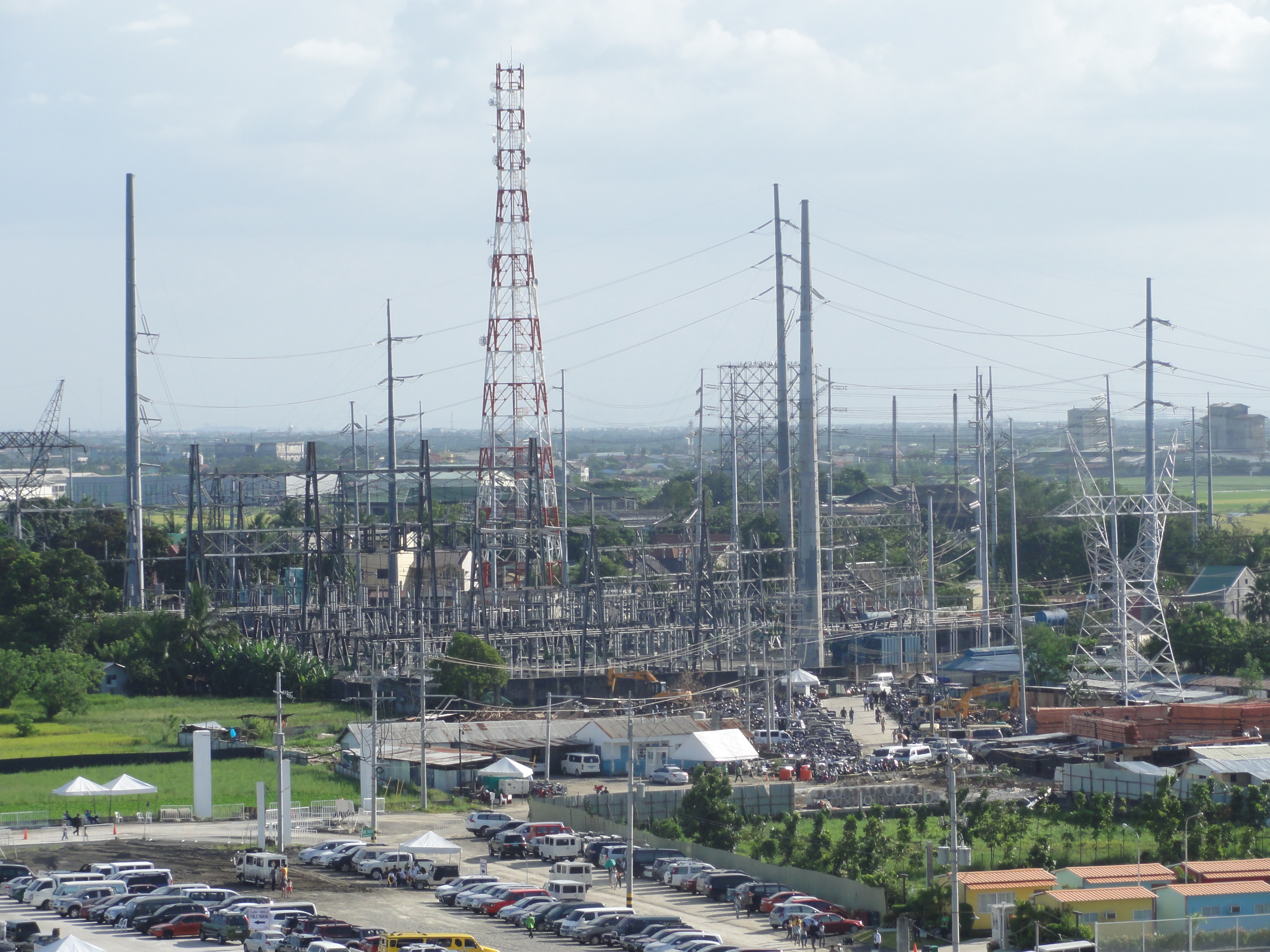
The Meralco Duhat Substation at Duhat, Bocaue.

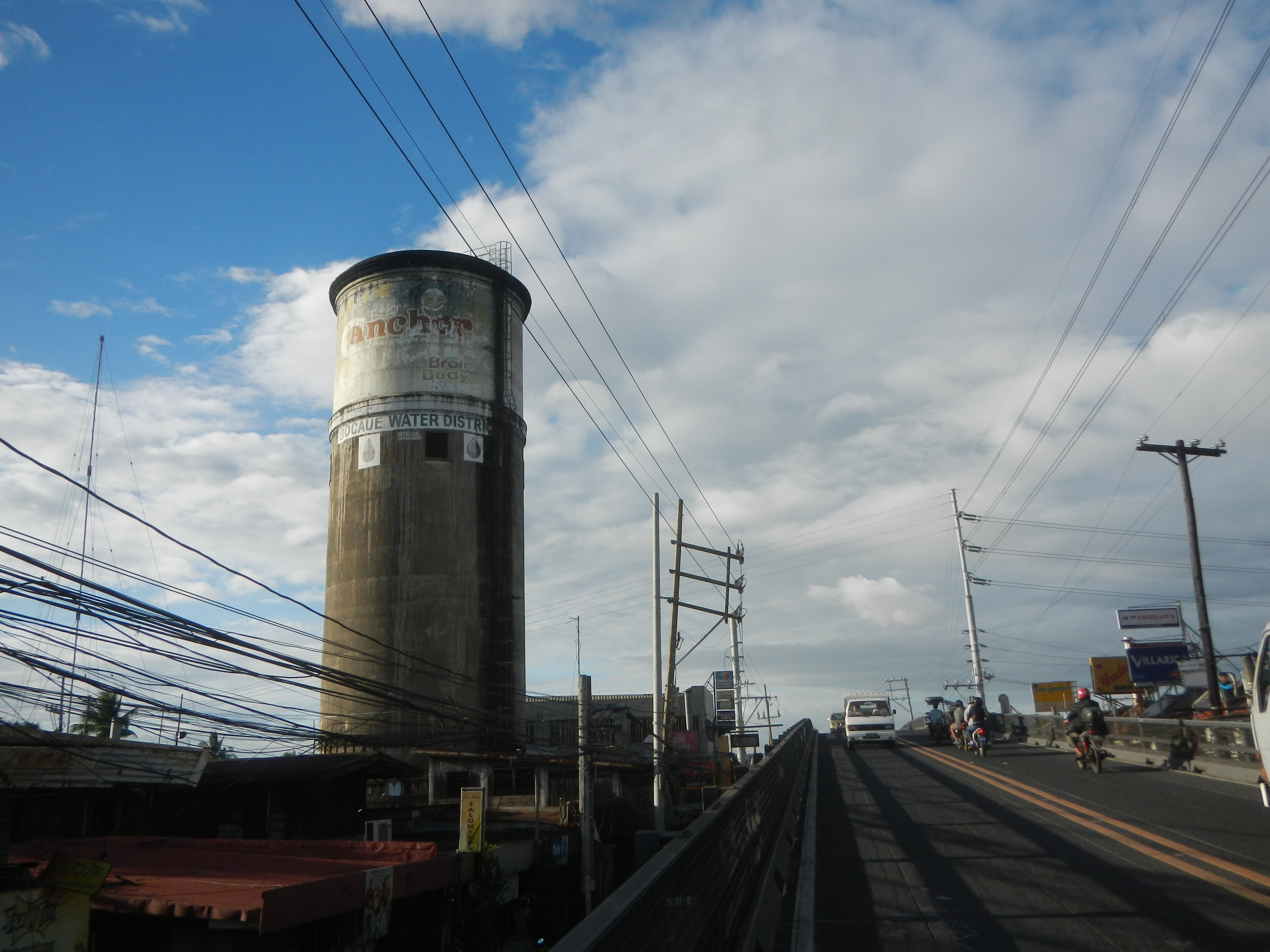
The NAWASA Bocaue Water District's watertower.

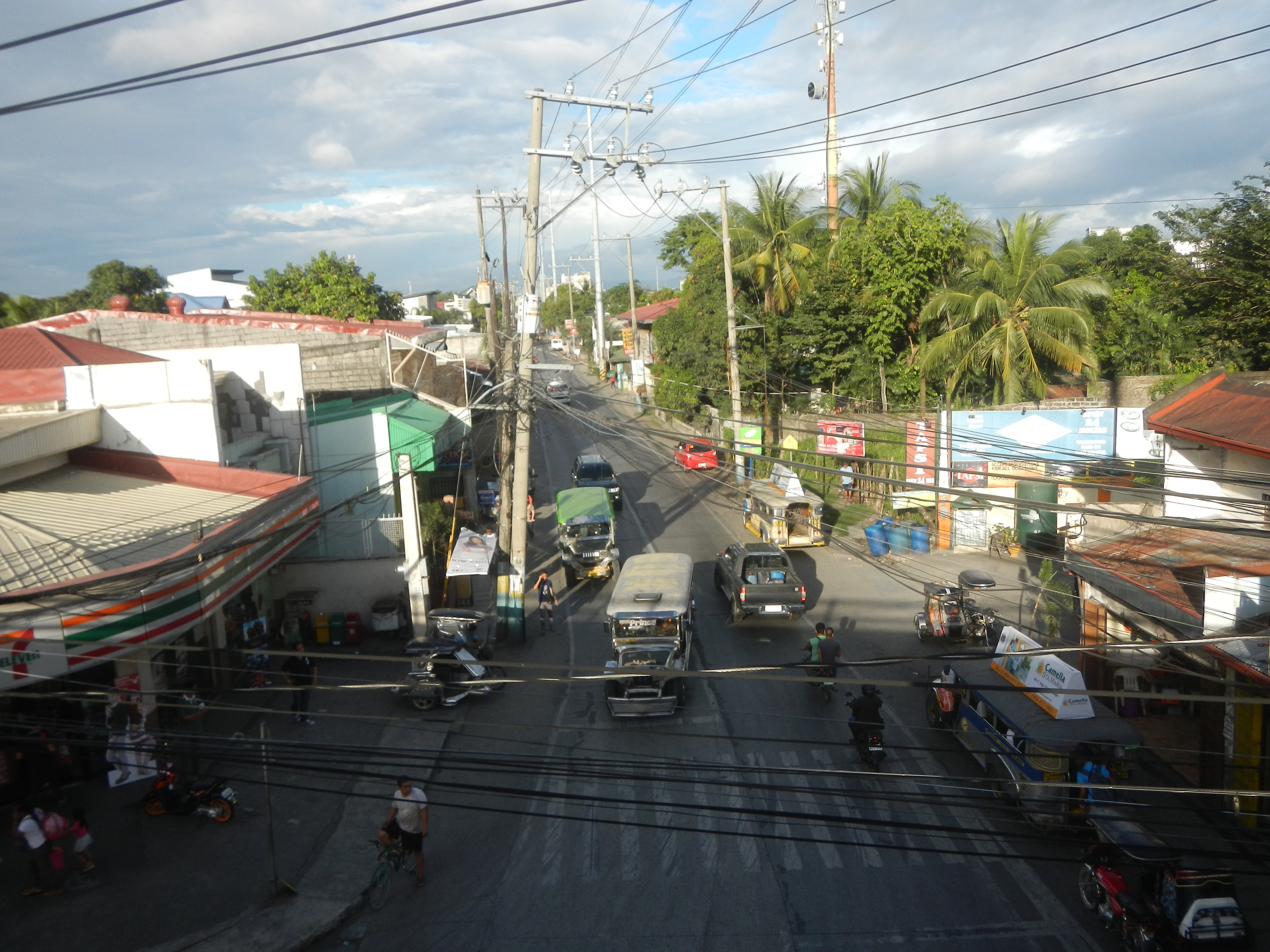
From the town's poblacion, this is the west end of the Fortunato Halili Avenue that leads to Barangay Turo (where the town's main fireworks shopping strip is located) and the old Bocaue exit to the NLEX. The avenue also leads to the town of Santa Maria and San Jose del Monte City.

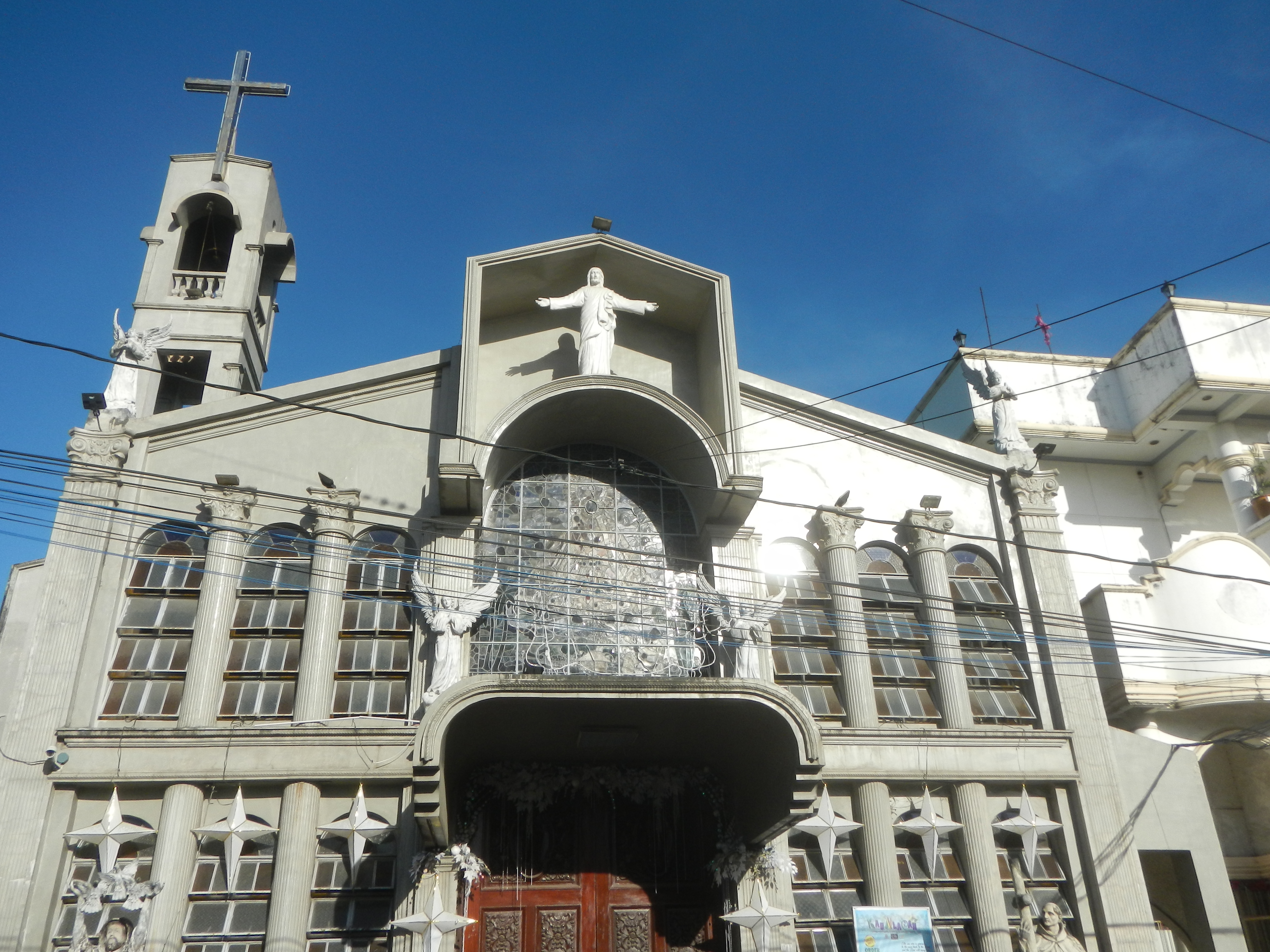
Saint Peter of Alcantara Parish Church, Barangay Taal.

A daytime view of the Philippine Arena in Ciudad de Victoria, Bocaue.

Another view of the Philippine Sports Stadium in Ciudad de Victoria, Bocaue.

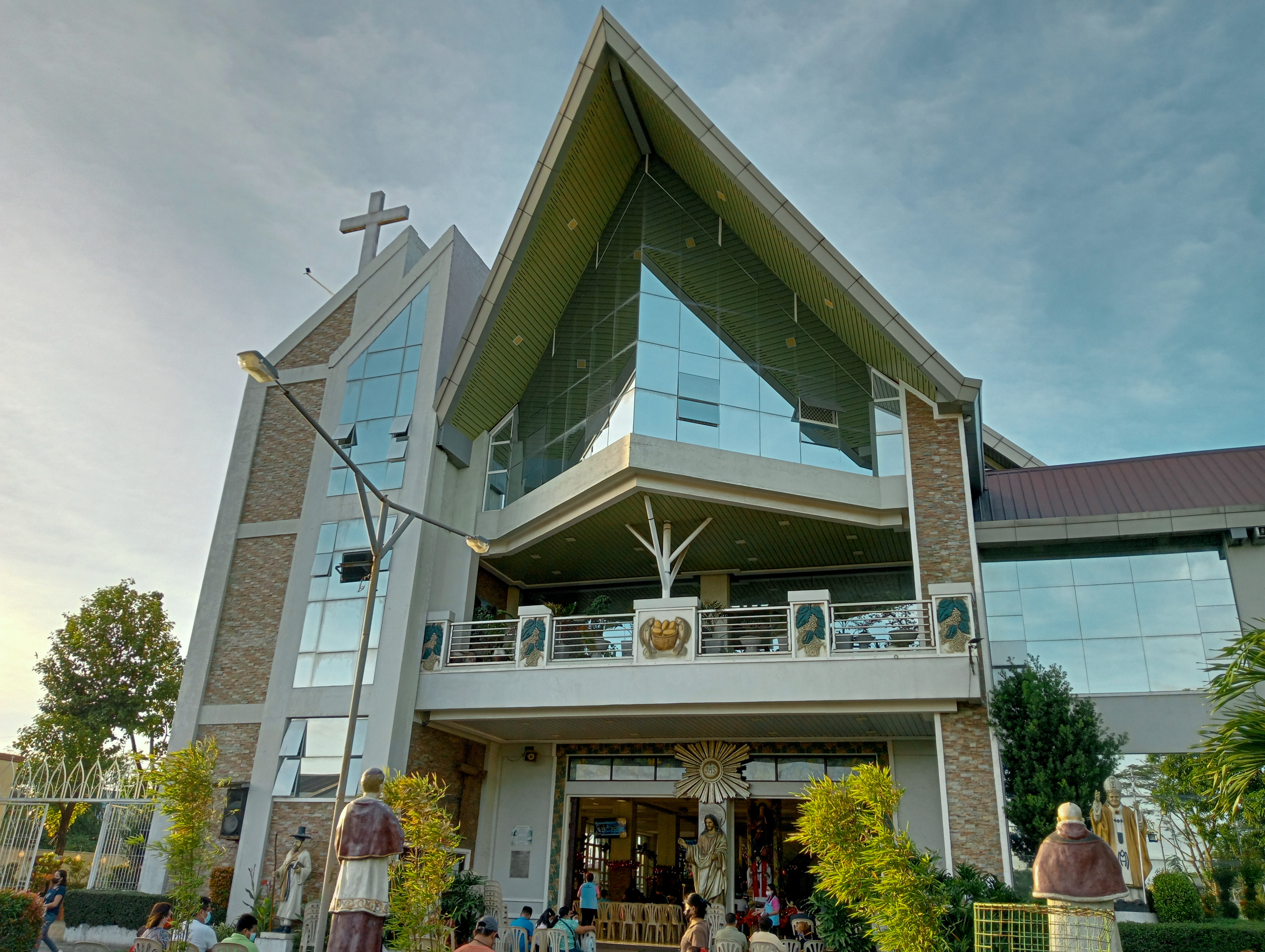
St. Andrew Kim Parish Church, Barangay Lolomboy.

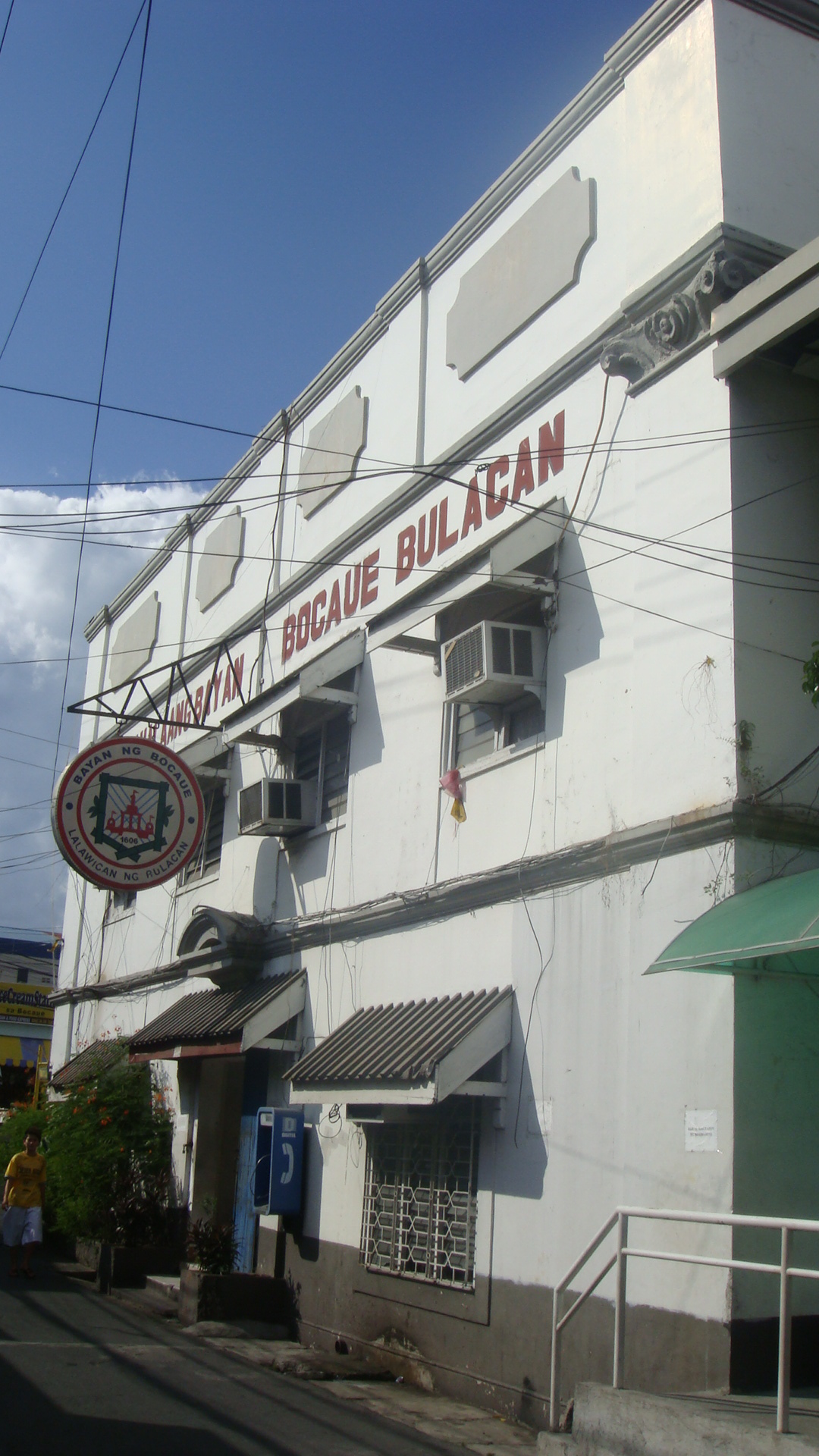
Bocaue Museum and Cultural Hub site (18th century Casa de Municipal de Bocaue).

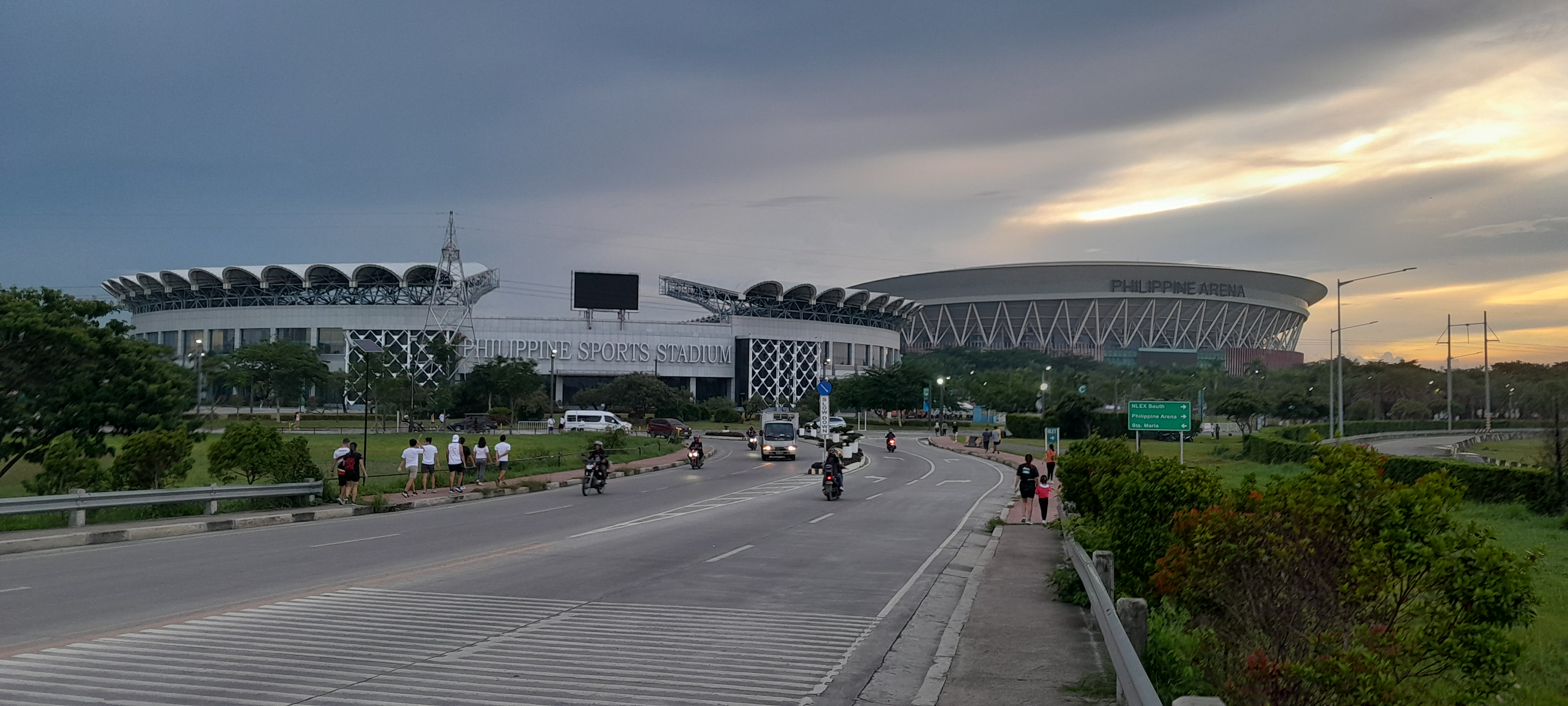
The Philippine Arena and the Philippine Sports Stadium of Ciudad de Victoria seen from the bypass road from Barangay Biñang 1st, Bocaue.
