= Bocaue Pagoda Festival =

Religious festival in Philippines

Bocaue Pagoda Festival: Kapistahan ng Pagoda sa Bocaue; Pagoda sa Wawa
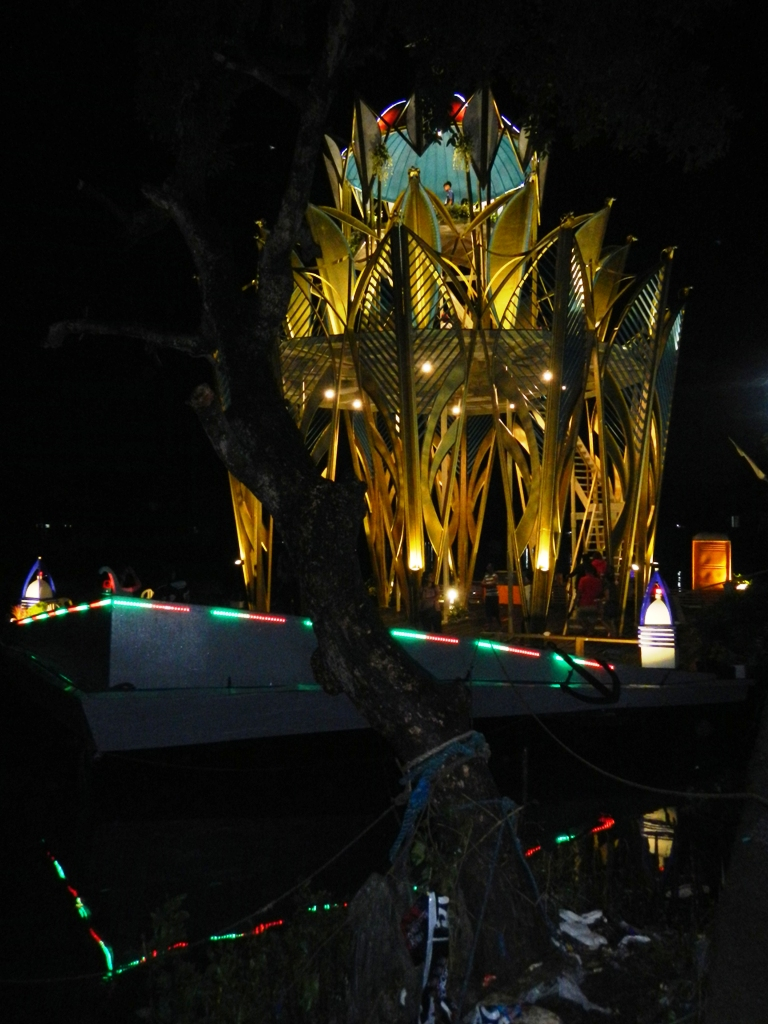
- The pagoda for the 2015 festivities.
- Status: Active
- Frequency: 1st Sunday of July
- Venue: Bocaue River
- Locations: Bocaue, Bulacan
- Country: Philippines
- Established: 1850
- Participants: Residents of Bocaue, Devotees of the Holy Cross of Wawa
- Major events: Pagoda river procession, holy mass, novena, entertainment events

The Bocaue Pagoda Festival, also known as the Bocaue River Festival, is an annual religious celebration in Bocaue, Bulacan, Philippines. It is best known for its river procession dedicated to the Catholic relic, the Holy Cross of Wawa (Tagalog: Krus sa Wawa).

== History ==
The Bocaue River Festival's devotion is connected to the Holy Cross of Wawa. Made of wood, it was found rushing through the Wawa section of the Bocaue River during a typhoon in 1850. Local legend says a drowning woman clung to the Cross and was saved, an event later deemed a miracle. The Cross was retrieved and enshrined in a riverside church; the timber of the object is believed to have come from an old, burnt-down church. A fluvial parade has been held since then as tribute to the relic.

In 1993, the large, ceremonial barge called the pagoda that carries the Cross sank due to overloading. The accident came to be known as the Bocaue Pagoda tragedy. The procession was scaled down until 2014 when a "grand pagoda" featured again in the festival. Celebrations were limited due to the COVID-19 pandemic, with the Cross borne by a government yacht instead.

== Observances ==
The Bocaue River Festival is observed every first Sunday of July, in honor of the Holy Cross of Wawa. The Cross, enshrined at Saint Martin of Tours Parish Church, is considered miraculous by devotees.

The highlight is the fluvial procession with the pagoda as its centrepiece. The Cross itself, or a replica, is placed on top of the pagoda for this procession. A custom is the ligiran (from the word "surround"), where smaller boats encircle the pagoda. The Lutina or nine-day novena is also held, while the municipal government also hold other entertainment events as part of the festivities.

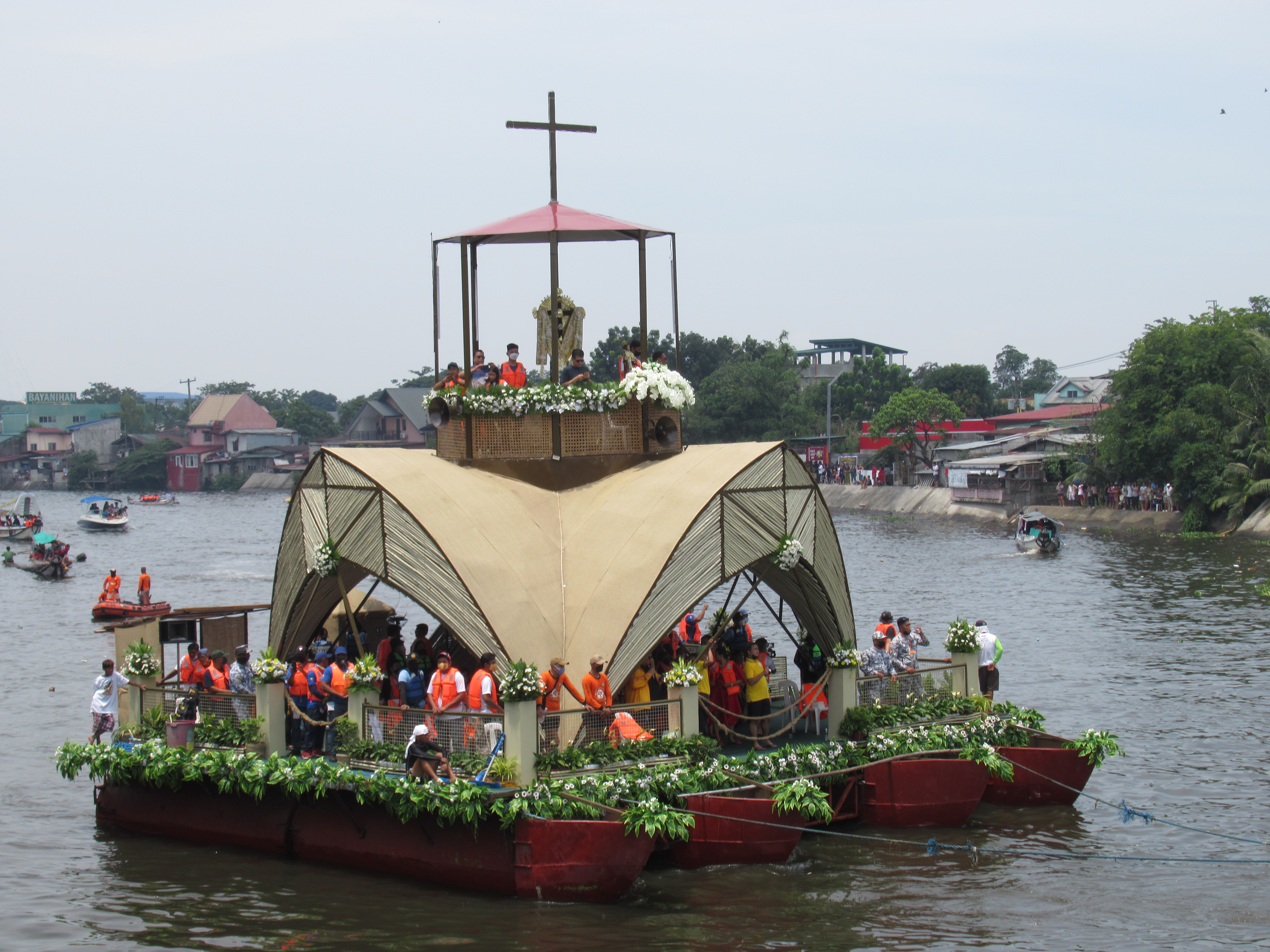
2022 Celebration

Since 2014, a mass is also said on the floating pagoda to pray for victims of the 1993 tragedy, the barge moored over the exact place in the river where the overloaded pagoda sank.
