= Bocaue pagoda tragedy =

1993 sinking of floating pagoda in Bulacan, Philippines

Bocaue Pagoda Tragedy
- Date: July 2, 1993 (33 years ago)
- Time: 8:15 p.m. – 8:50 p.m. PST
- Location: Bocaue, Bulacan
- Also known as: Bocaue River Festival tragedy
- Cause: Overloading
- Deaths: Between 226 and 279 people (varying estimates)

The Bocaue pagoda tragedy was a fatal accident that occurred on July 2, 1993, during the Bocaue Pagoda Festival in Bocaue, Bulacan, Philippines. The accident was the result of the festivities' centerpiece – a floating pagoda – sinking, which led to the deaths of more than 200 people.

== Background ==
The Bocaue River Festival is an annual celebration held every first Sunday of July in Bocaue in honor of the Holy Cross, the Mahal na Poon ng Krus sa Wawa, established in 1850 in the Bocaue River, a tributary of the Santa Maria River. The festivities involve a decorated pagoda on top of a barge surrounded by small boats accompanying it. A replica of the holy cross is placed at the top of the pagoda.

== The incident ==
The pagoda for the 1993 celebrations was estimated to be carrying 800 to 1000 devotees. At 8:15 p.m, the accident occurred taking the lives of between 226 and 279 people. The pagoda sank in the middle of the Bocaue River between the barangays of Bunlo and Bambang. The pagoda was 20 feet tall.

According to witnesses many of the people on board the pagoda were forced to move to one side of the barge reacting to a kwitis (skyrocket) flying towards the pagoda. The concentrated weight of the people on board tilted the barge. The people on board the pagoda panicked as they heard the noise of crackling timber. The structure of the pagoda collapsed and gradually sank to the riverbed.

Witnesses claimed that fishermen by the river bank drew their fishing boats towards the sinking pagoda to try to save people from the pagoda. The pagoda's light was still on and its power generator was still operational as the pagoda sank causing many people to believe that electrocution caused some of the fatalities.

Thirteen-year-old Sahjid S. Bulig and his friend Richard Celestino, both members of the Boy Scouts of the Philippines (BSP), were able to save eight children who were on the pagoda, with Bulig saving six by continuously returning to the pagoda despite Celestino's warnings. In the morning after the incident, Bulig was found to have perished.

== Aftermath ==
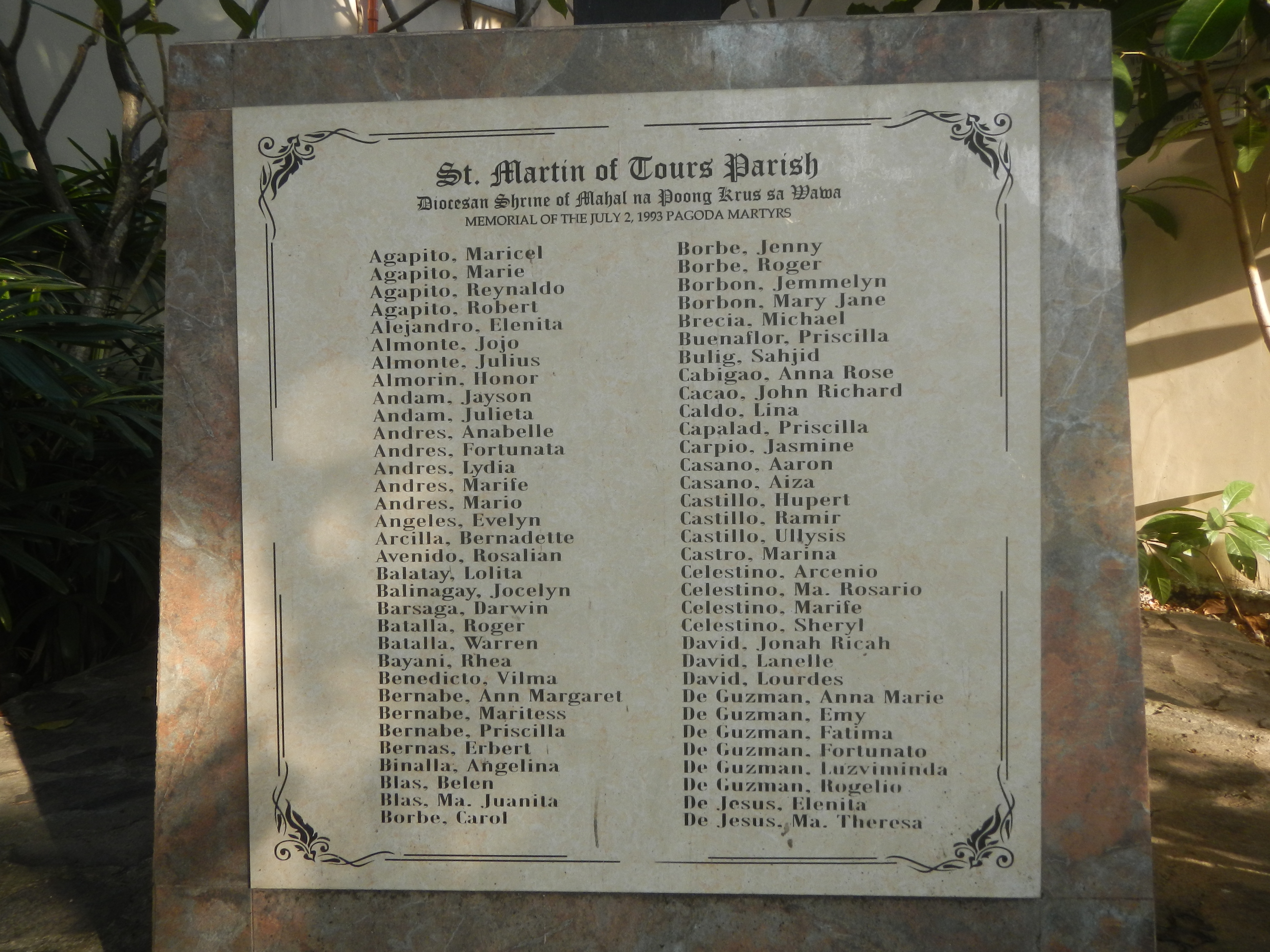
Memorial dedicated to the "1993 Pagoda Martyrs" or the victims of the accident.

Retrieval operations of the victims took several days. Victims were checked for vital signs in different area hospitals. The bodies of the deceased were identified at the town plaza, while the basketball court served as a morgue. It was believed that the casualties of the incident involved entire families.

On October 31, 1993, the BSP posthumously awarded Bulig with the Gold Medal of Honor, while they awarded Celestino with the Silver Medal of Honor, both for their heroic deeds in the tragedy. In the same year, the Department of the Interior and Local Government created the Sahjid Bulig Presidential Award for Heroism, in honor of Bulig's actions and sacrifice.

=== 1994 festival and hiatus ===
The 1994 celebrations for the Bocaue River Festival were sized down. The new pagoda made was just 2 feet tall compared to 1993's 4 feet tall pagoda. Only 50 people were allowed to board the raft. 12 boats accompanied the pagoda. The police and military lifeguards were stationed along the route of the pagoda procession. The event took place in the morning which commenced at 10:00 am. Relatives of the 1993 tragedy floated flowers and candles on the river to honor of their loved ones. A mass was also held for the victims. July 2 became a day of mourning for the victims of the 1993 tragedy.

=== 2014 revival ===
Church and local officials decided to revive the grand procession and build a large pagoda for the 2014 edition of the festival, after coming up with safety measures for the devotees. The decision came as a bid to boost the local economy of Bocaue.

A 48-foot or three stories-high pagoda which stands on top of three large boats rented from Malabon was built for the festival. The ground floor of the pagoda covered 200 square meters. The wooden pagoda was reinforced by steel. Changes included allowing only 150 devotees to board the pagoda per trip. Each devotee was required to register and wear a life vest, and pregnant women were not allowed to board the pagoda. Businessman Ruben Mercado, who chaired the festival committee, said restoring the fluvial festival needed to be done "to relieve people of the guilt and the grief they've shouldered for 21 years."

== In popular culture ==
- In 1995, Seiko Films produced a film titled Bocaue Pagoda Tragedy, directed by Maria Saret. It starred Charito Solis, Joel Torre, Robert Arevalo, Isko Moreno, Romnick Sarmenta, Maricel Laxa, Rica Peralejo and Gardo Versoza. In this dramatization, Sajid Bulig and Richard Celestino were written out and although the cause of accident remained the same on account of people moving to one side of the pagoda and causing it to tilt, it began with a violent brawl among a group of male devotees wherein an oil lamp was knocked causing an onboard fire, rather than a firework rocket (kwitis) being fired to their direction.
- The GMA Network docudrama, Case Unclosed, aired an episode on the tragedy.
- ABS-CBN'S Bayani has an episode on the tragedy, focusing on Sajid Bulig.
  - They also later featured this incident as a story on their YouTube exclusive documentary series Philippines Most Shocking Stories, retold by Johnson Manabat.

== See also ==
- List of maritime disasters in the Philippines
