= Shrine of Saint Andrew Kim =

Roman Catholic church in Bulacan, Philippines

Shrine of Saint Andrew Kim Taegon
- Parish of Nuestro Señor Jesucristo and the Diocesan Shrine of Saint Andrew Kim Tae‑gon
- 성 김대건 안드레아 성당 (Korean)
- New church building complex in 2016

- Location in Bulacan Location in Luzon Location in the Philippines
- 14°46′45″N 120°55′54″E
- Location: Brgy. Lolomboy, Bocaue, Bulacan
- Country: Philippines
- Denomination: Roman Catholic

History
- Status: Convent
- Dedication: Andrew Kim Taegon

Architecture
- Functional status: Active
- Architectural type: Church building
- Groundbreaking: 2001
- Completed: 2015

Administration
- Province: Manila
- Diocese: Malolos

Clergy
- Priest: Teodorico L. Trinidad

The Parish of Nuestro Señor Jesucristo and the Diocesan Shrine of Saint Andrew Kim Tae-gon, commonly known as the Shrine of Saint Andrew Kim Taegon (Korean: 성 김대건 안드레아 성당), is a Roman Catholic church in Bocaue, Bulacan, Philippines. It is under the jurisdiction of the Diocese of Malolos. The patron saint of the church is the first Korean priest and martyr Andrew Kim Taegon.

== History ==
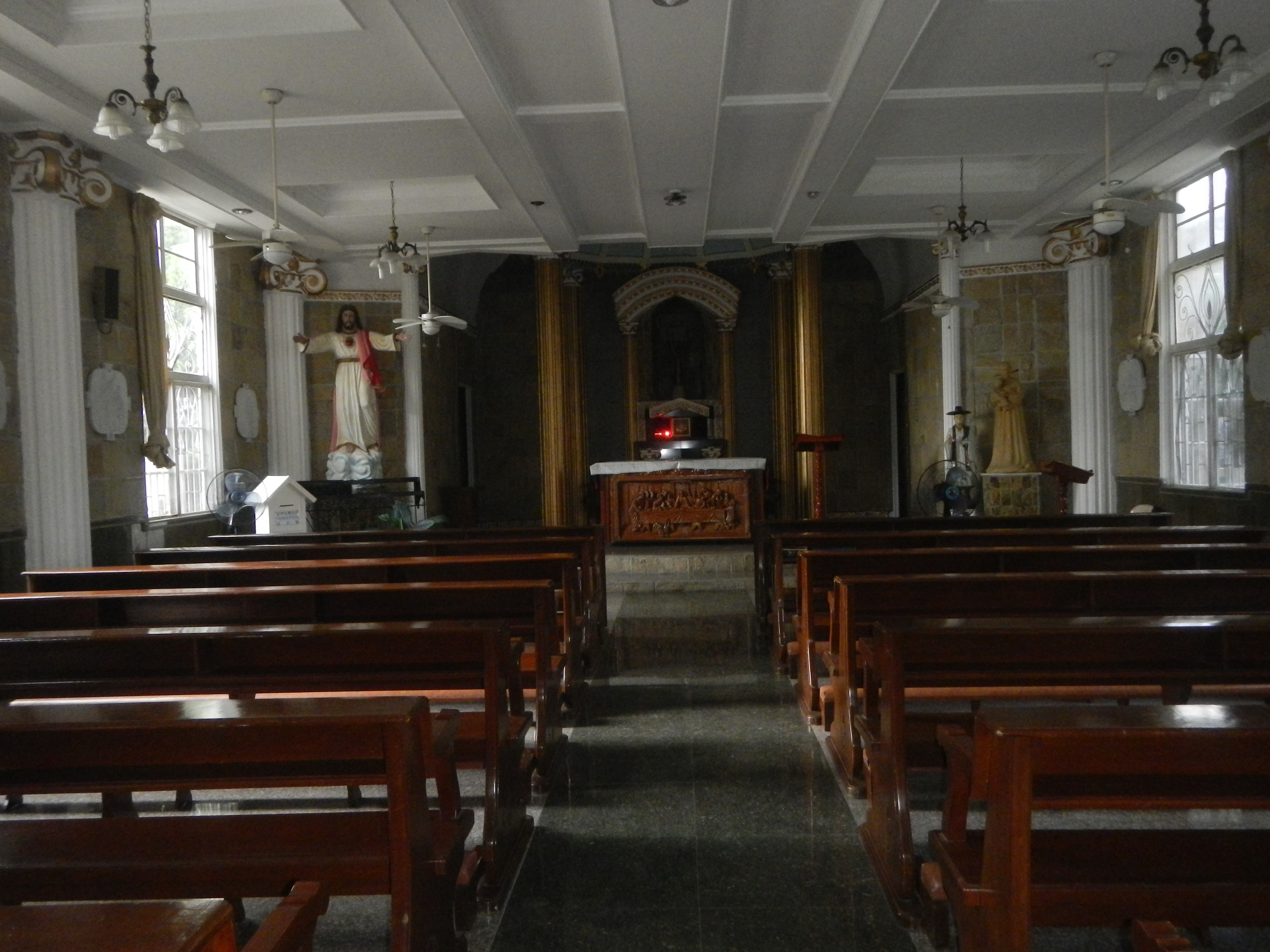
Church interior in 2017

The Parish of Santo Cristo was established in 1959. The parish was made the sister parish in Korea in 1986, and a new shrine was determined to be dedicated to Saint Andrew Kim Taegon. Stephen Cardinal Kim, the Archbishop of Seoul at the time, gave a statue of Saint Andrew Kim Taegon to the parish, the statue was first enshrined on the old church building, later moved to the new shrine.

The construction of the new church building, called Project Pangarap, began in 2001 under the parish priest Father Avel Sampana. The construction coincided with the 50th anniversary of the parish. The shrine was completed in 2015 when the parish priest is Father Vicente "Vic" Robles, the former rector and parish priest of the National Shrine of the Divine Mercy in Marilao, Bulacan.

The church is to be dedicated to the Korean Saint Andrew Kim Taegon, the first Korean-born Catholic priest. He was born in the early 19th century. During the Joseon Dynasty, where Christianity was suppressed and many Christians were persecuted. Kim fled to Lolomboy in Bocaue in the Philippines where he lived as a seminarian before he moved to Macau to study further and ordained as a priest. After the ordination in Shanghai, Kim led a group of French missionaries to Joseon to convert people to Christianity in Korea. He was arrested and executed in 1846. He was beatified by Pope Pius XI in 1925 and canonized by Pope John Paul II in May 1984.
