= Saint Martin of Tours Parish Church (Bocaue) =

Roman Catholic church in Bulacan, Philippines

St. Martin of Tours Parish
- St. Martin of Tours Parish and Diocesan Shrine of Mahal na Poon ng Krus sa Wawa
- Parokya ni San Martin ng Tours at Pandiyosesis na Dambana ng Mahal na Poong Krus sa Wawa (Filipino)
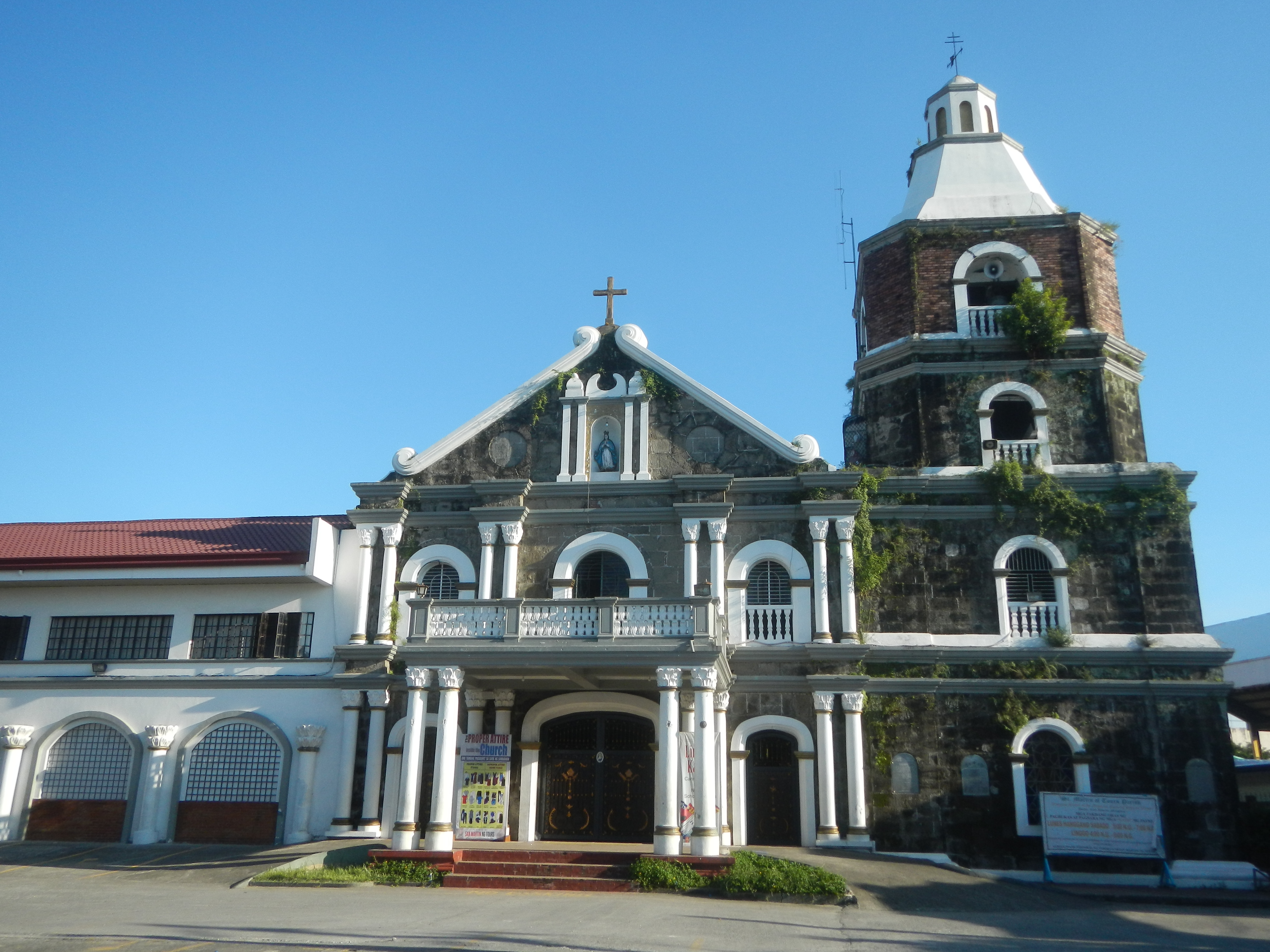
- Church facade in 2017

- Location in Bulacan Location in Luzon Location in the Philippines
- 14°47′44″N 120°55′33″E
- Location: Poblacion, Bocaue, Bulacan
- Country: Philippines
- Denomination: Roman Catholic
- Religious order: Franciscans

History
- Status: Diocesan Shrine
- Founded: 1606
- Dedication: Martin of Tours

Architecture
- Architectural type: Church building

Administration
- Province: Manila
- Diocese: Malolos
- Deanery: St. Martin of Tours
- Parish: St. Martin of Tours

Clergy
- Priest: Rev. Fr. Mario Jose C. Ladra (2021-present)

Saint Martin of Tours Parish Church, also known as the Diocesan Shrine of Mahal na Poon ng Krus sa Wawa, is a Roman Catholic church in Bocaue, Bulacan, Philippines. It is under the jurisdiction of the Diocese of Malolos. The church is one of the oldest in Bulacan, having been founded by Franciscan missionaries in 1606. It hosts the Holy Cross of Wawa, a wooden relic believed to be miraculous by devotees, which is the centerpiece of the recurring Bocaue River Festival.

In 1969, the parish founded a church-based credit union cooperative known as the St. Martin of Tours Credit and Development Cooperative (SMTCDC).

The church houses the venerated image of "Nuestra Señora de las Flores", which devotion started way before World War II, but the current image was only introduced to public in 1984. The image was canonically crowned on November 21, 2020, by His Excellency, Most Reverend Dennis Villarojo.

== Gallery ==
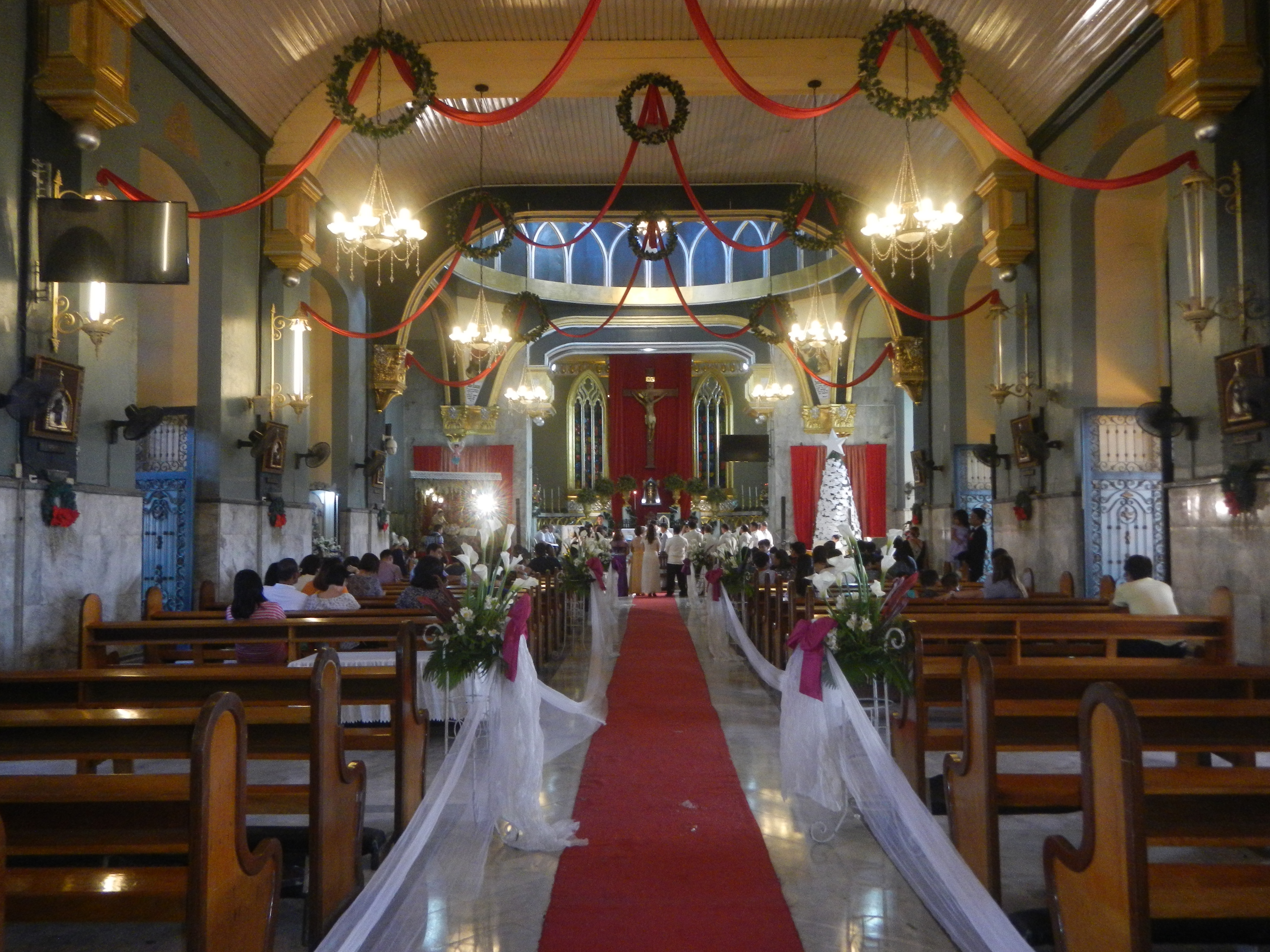
Church interior during a wedding in 2016

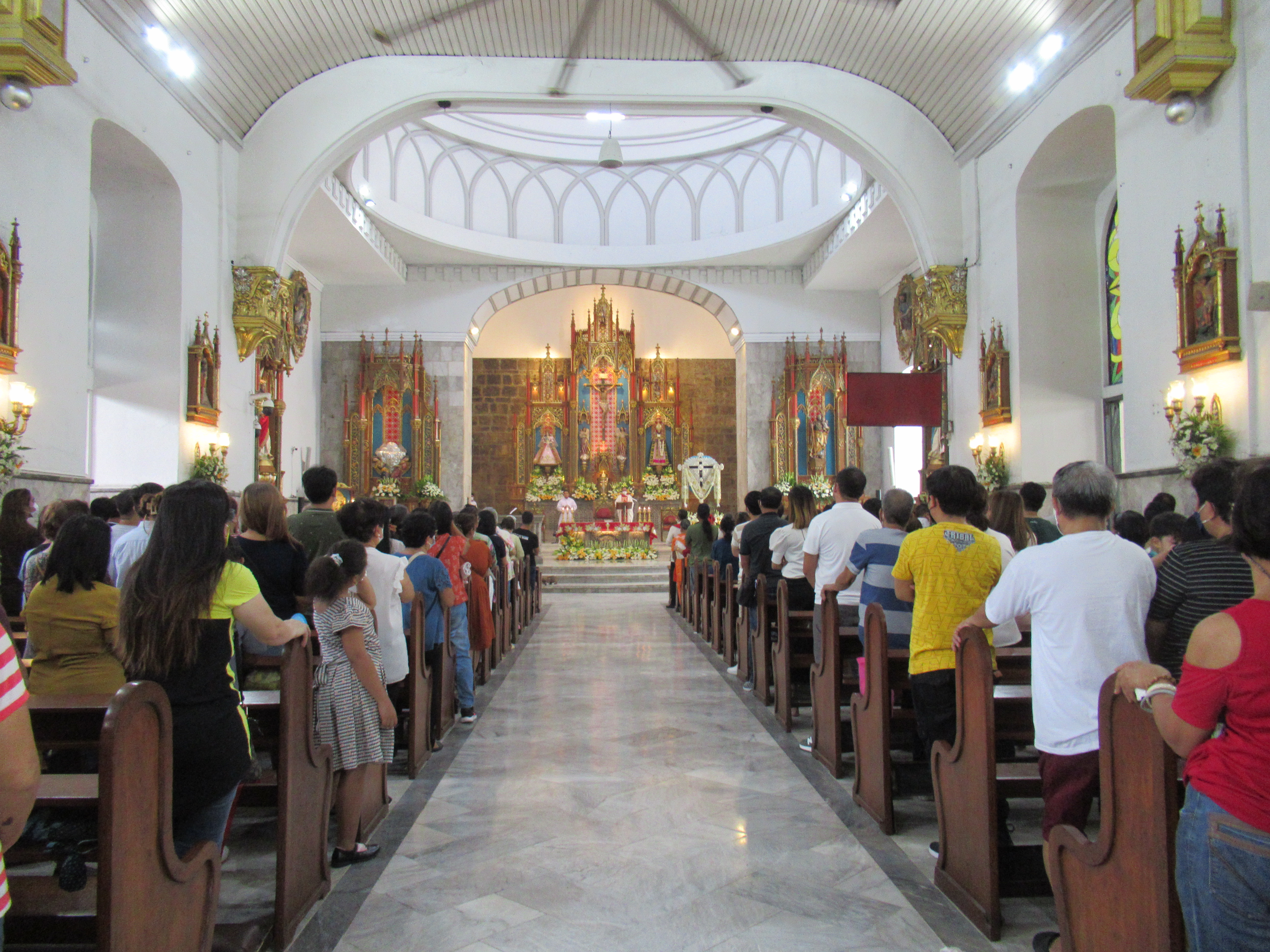
Church interior in 2022

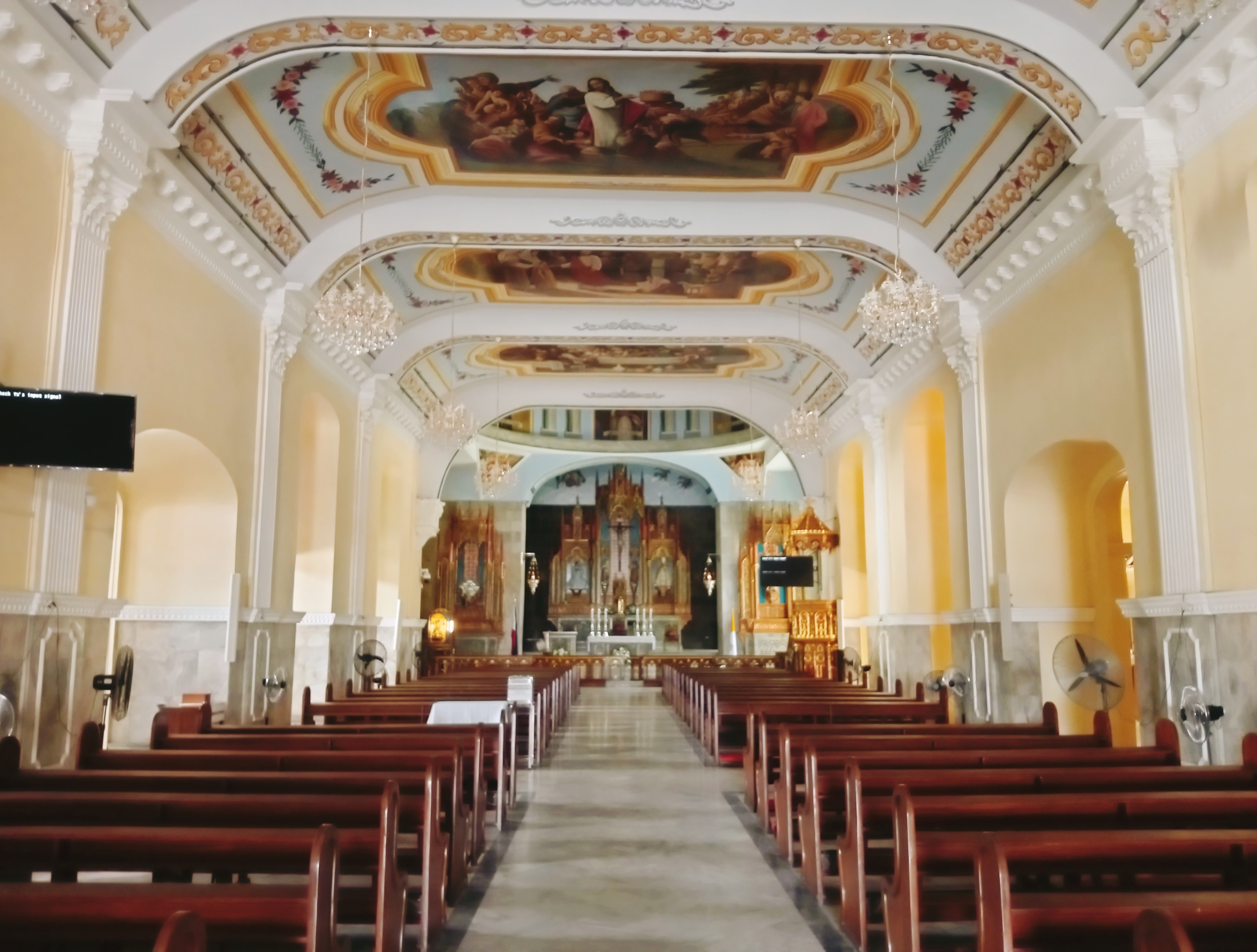
Church interior in 2024

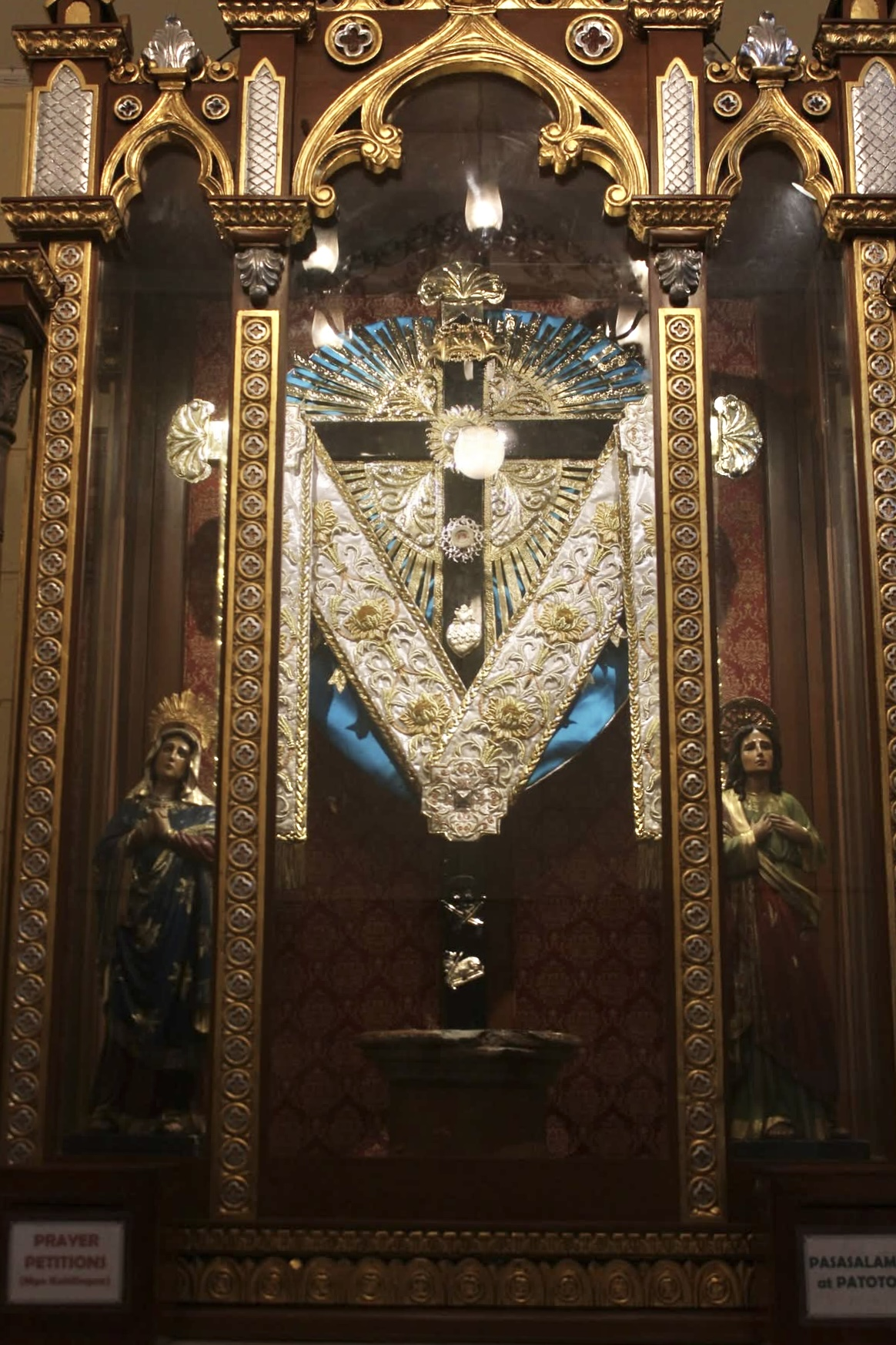
Ang Krus sa Wawa

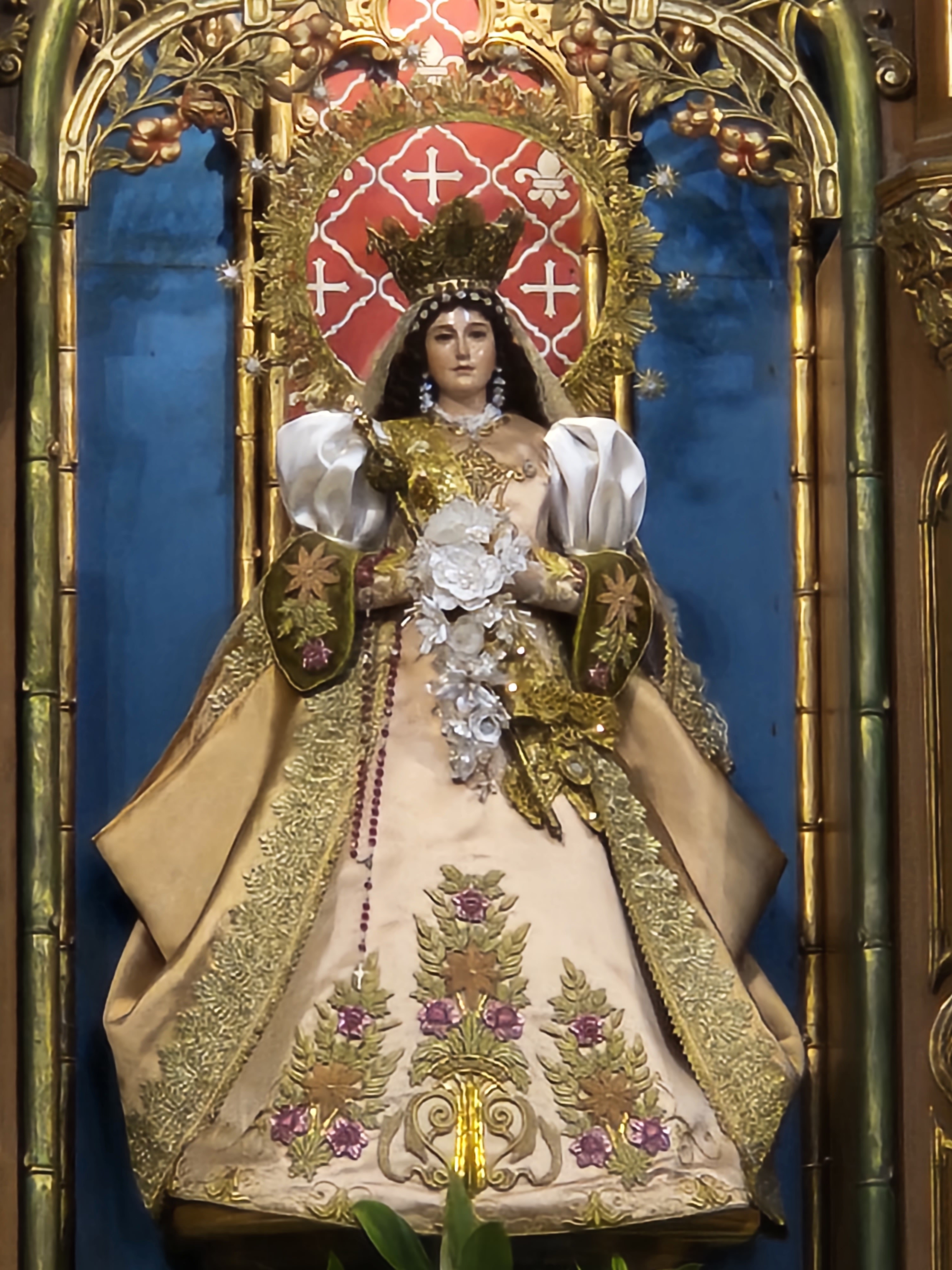
The image of Virgen de las Flores, "Ang Birhen sa Bocaue", was episcopally crowned in 2020.

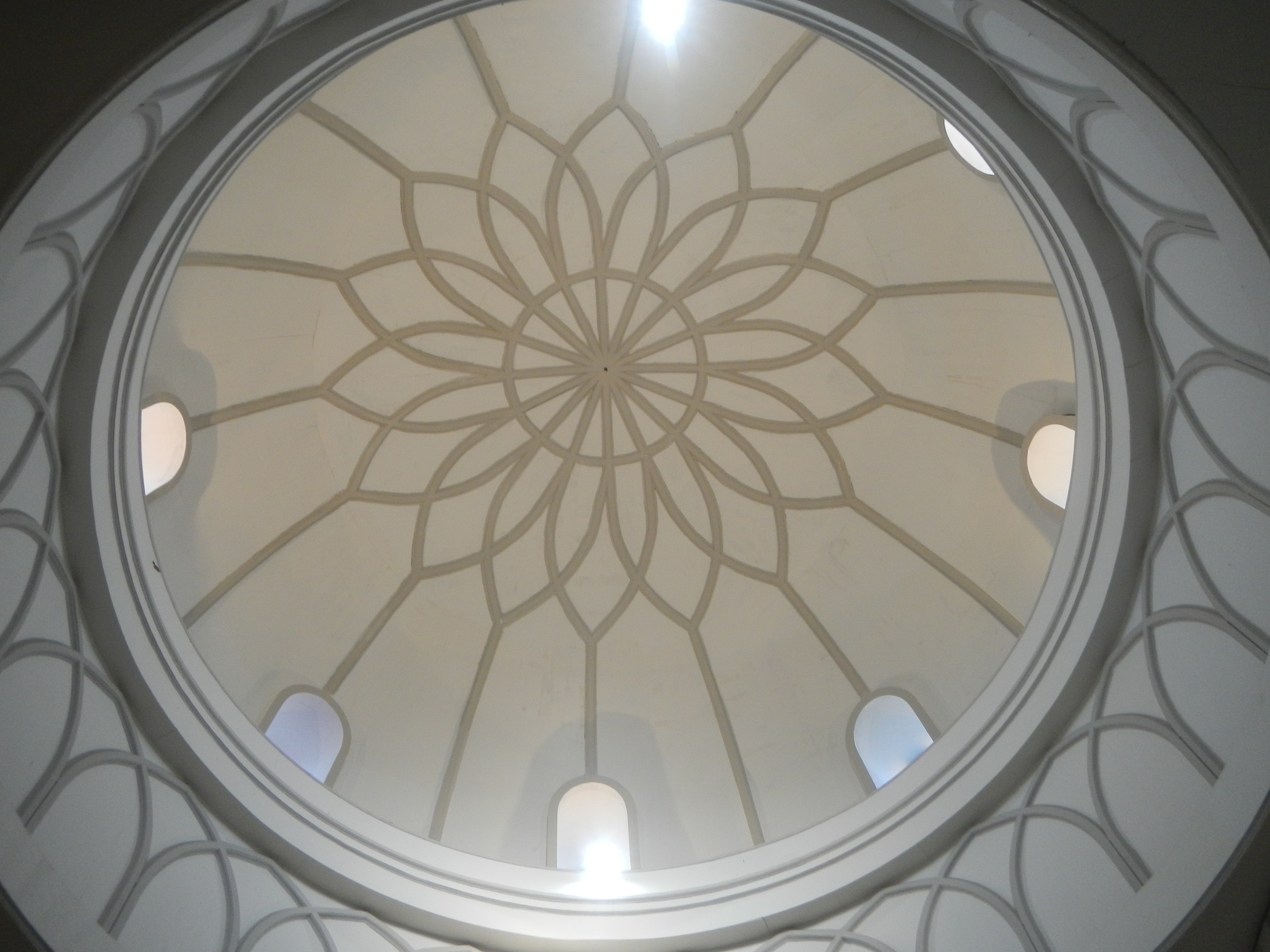
Dome interior and clerestories
