= San Jose del Monte =

Component city in Bulacan, Philippines

- Component city
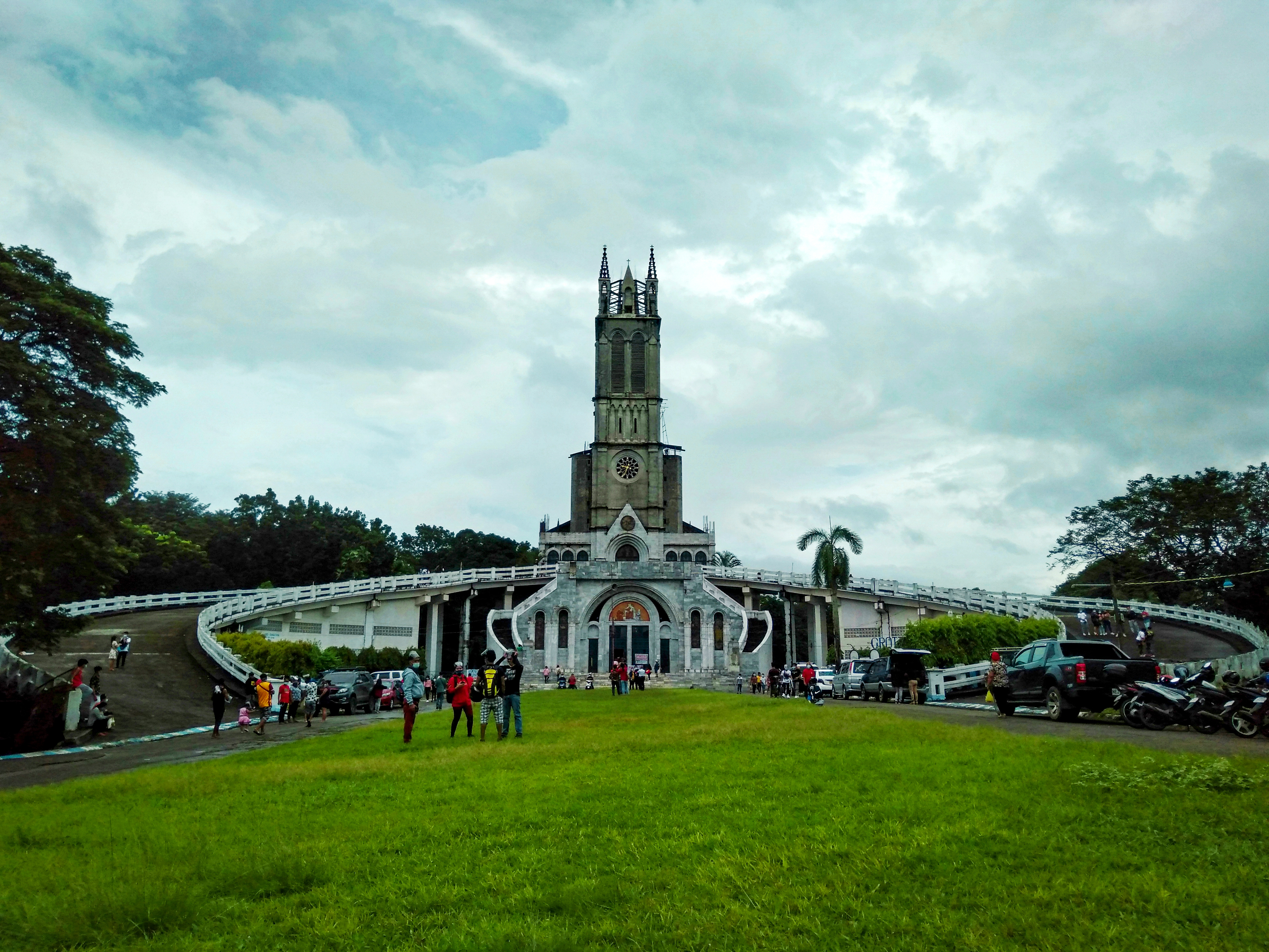
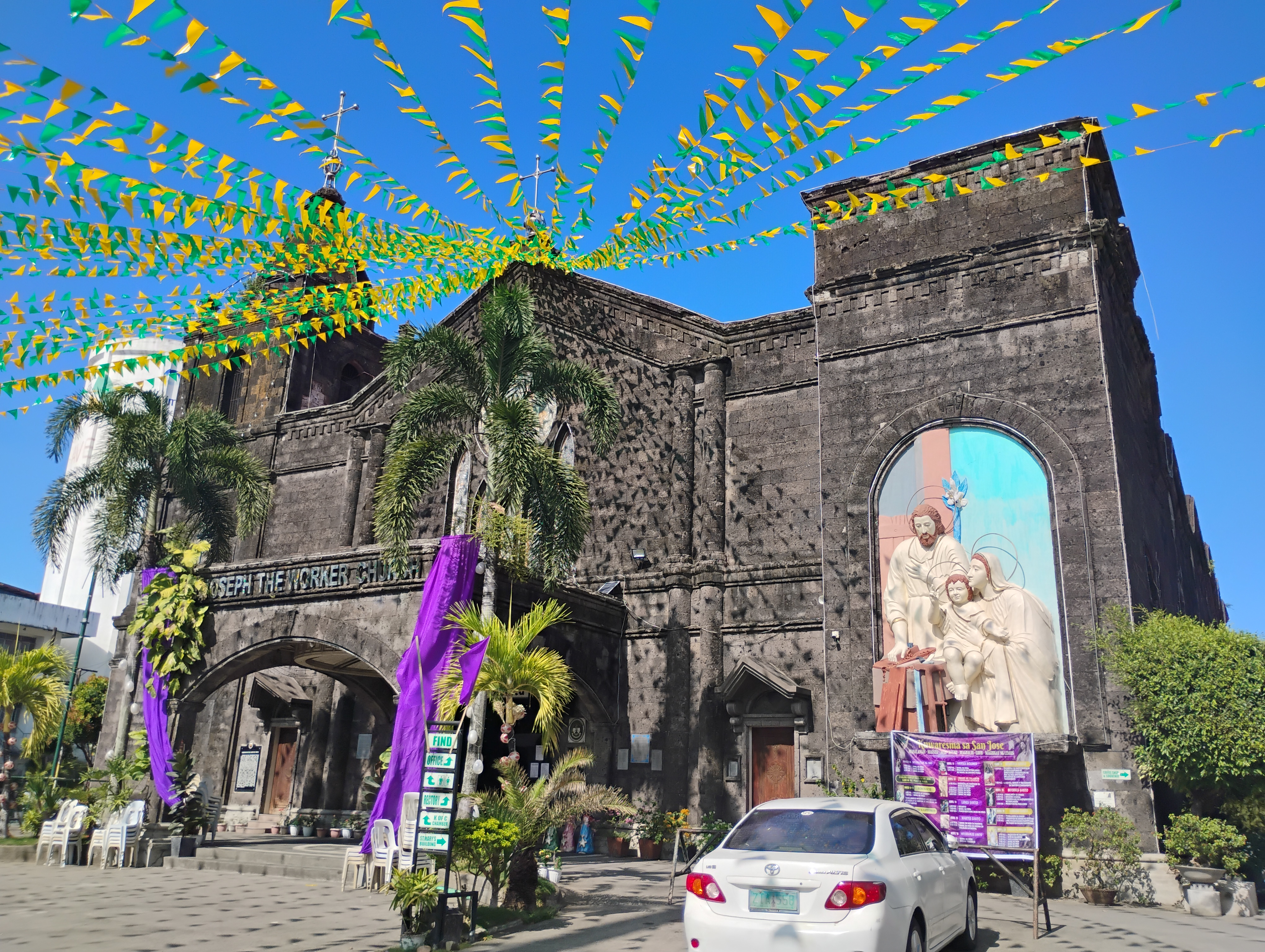
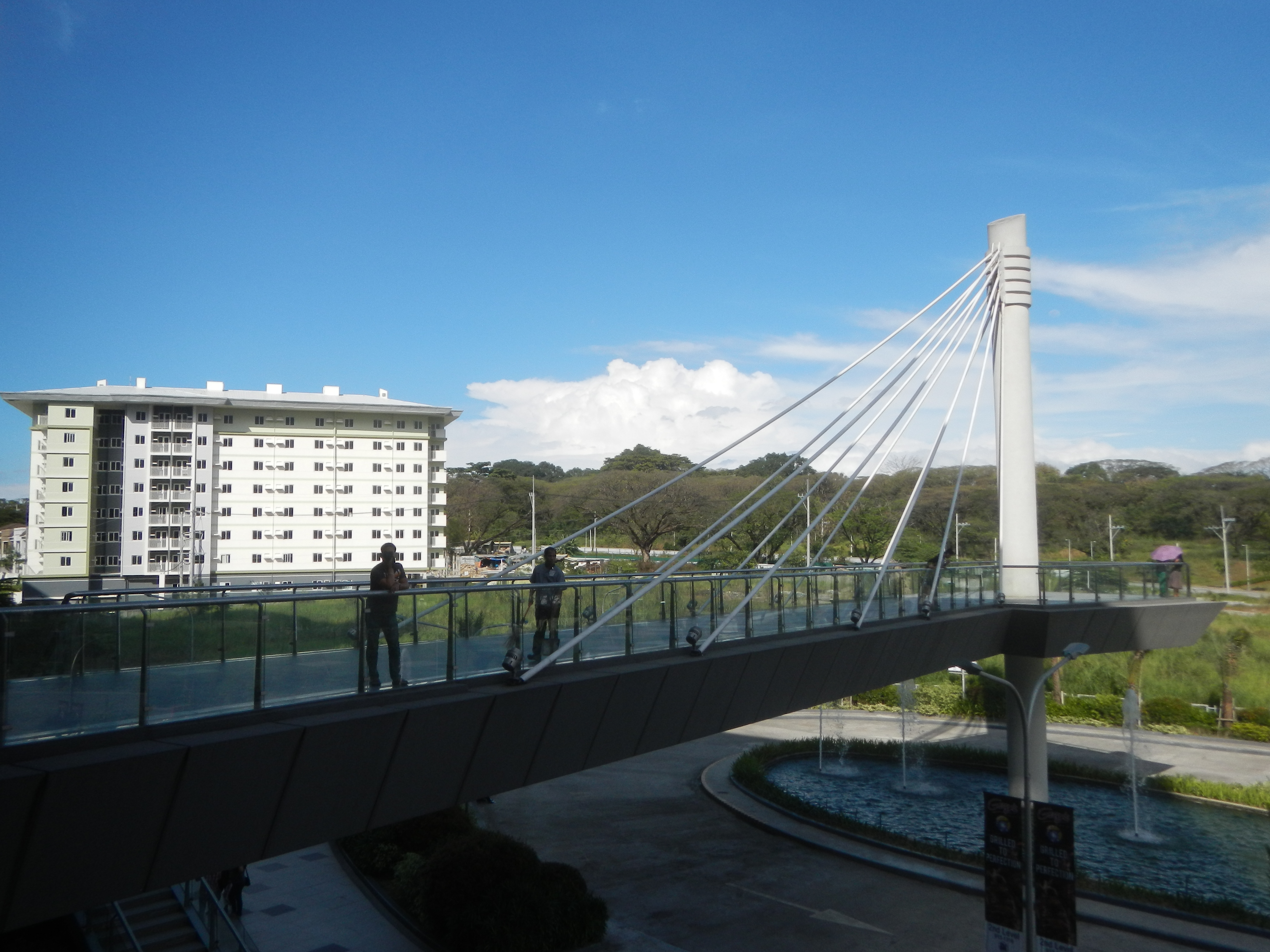
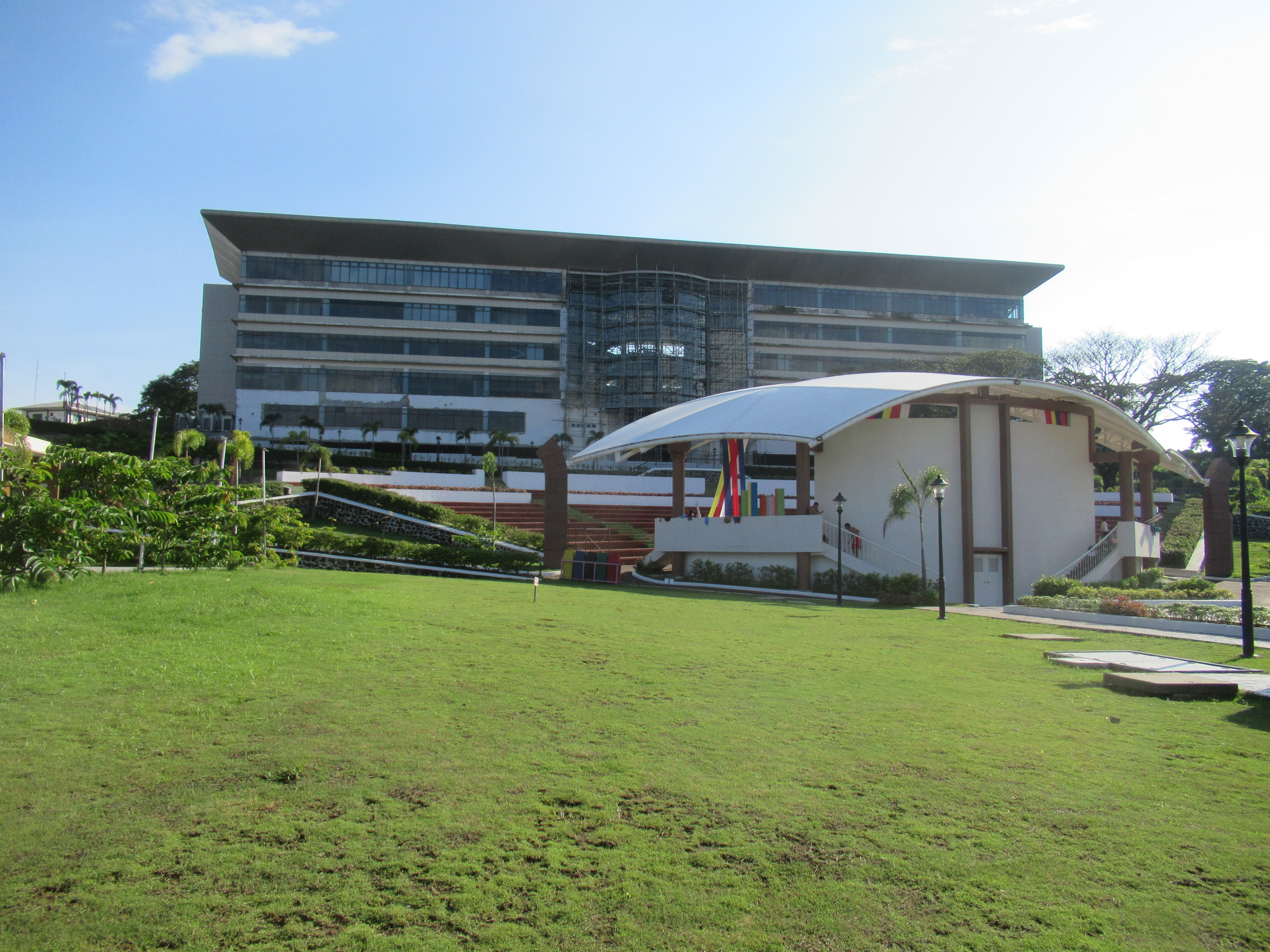
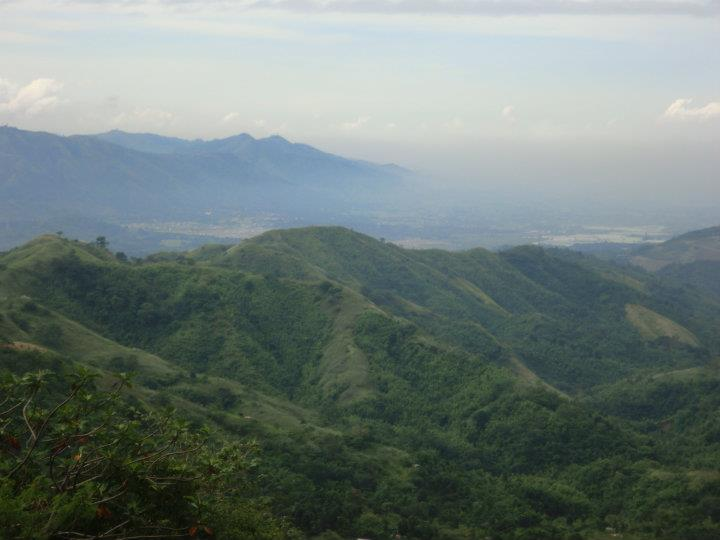
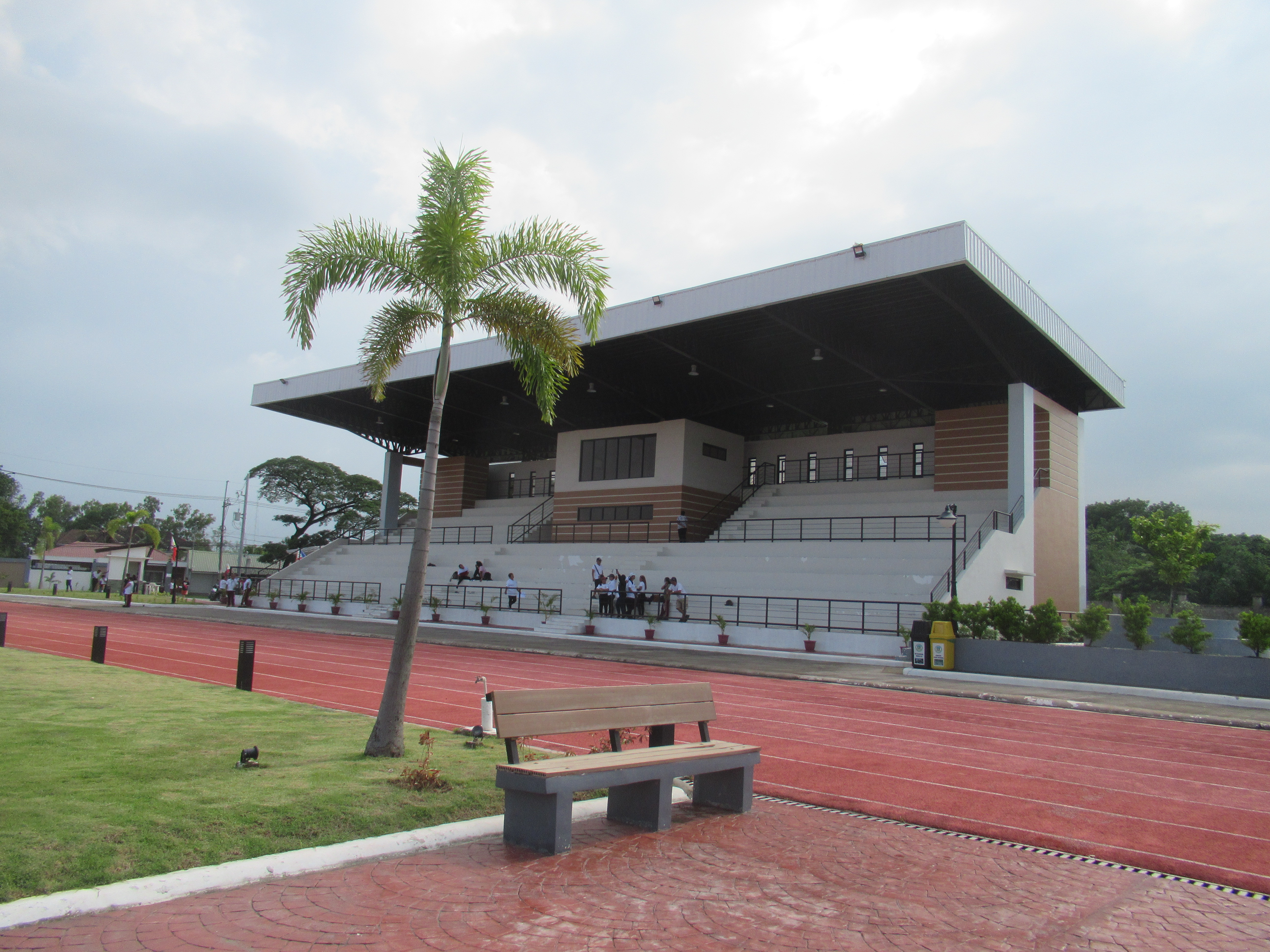
- Our Lady of Lourdes Grotto Shrine St. Joseph the Worker Parish QualiMed Hospital viewed from SM City San Jose del Monte New City Hall and River Esplanade Mount Balagbag People's Park & Sports Complex

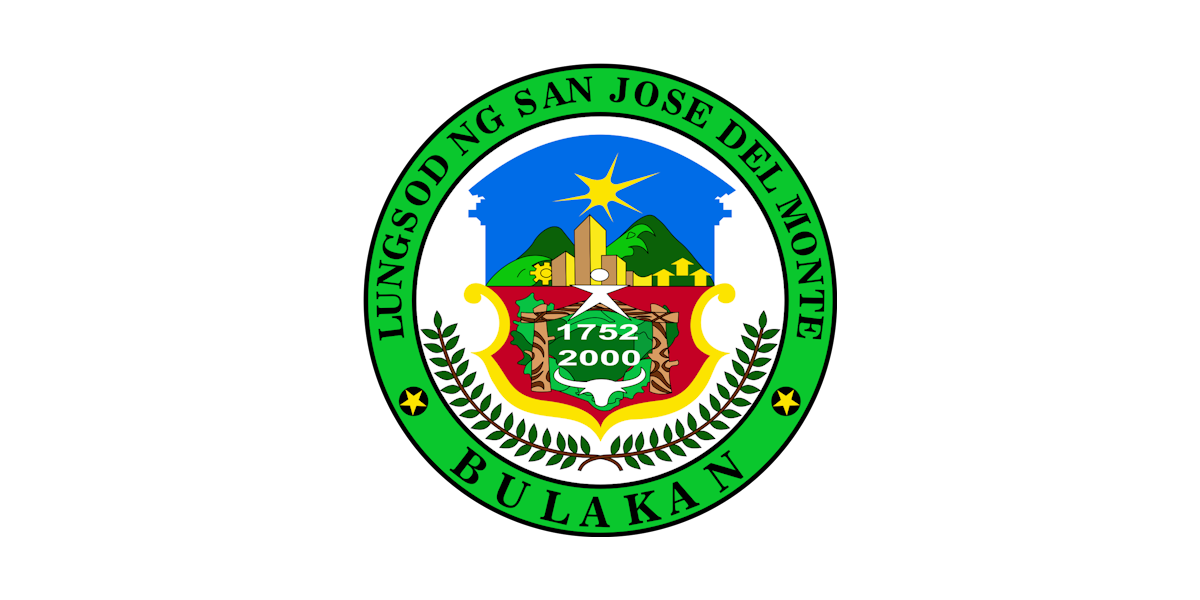
- Flag Seal
- Motto: Arya San Joseño!
- Anthem: San Jose del Monte Hymn
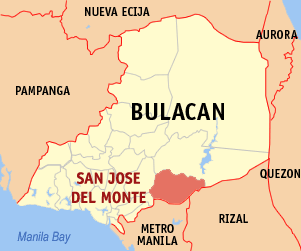
- Map of Bulacan with San Jose del Monte highlighted
- Interactive map of San Jose del Monte
- Location within the Philippines
- Coordinates: 14°48′36″N 121°02′51″E
- Country: Philippines
- Region: Central Luzon
- Province: Bulacan
- District: Lone district
- Founded: March 2, 1752
- Cityhood: September 10, 2000
- Lone district: December 18, 2003
- Named for: Saint Joseph
- Barangays: 59 (see Barangays)

Government
  - Type: Sangguniang Panlungsod
  - Mayor: Florida L. Pérez-Robes
  - Vice Mayor: Arlene C. Bartolomé-Arciaga
  - Representative: Arturo B. Robes
  - City Council: Members: 1st District; José J. Abela; Janet D. Reyes; Rosalyn C. Cabuco; Glenn M. Villano; Liezl N. Aguirre-Abat; Richard Maurice M. Robes; 2nd District; Romeo N. Agápito; Benjamín G. Acibal Jr.; Ryan B. Elfa; Celso G. Francisco; Argel Joseph V. Drio; Vanessa Michelle S. Roquero
  - Electorate: 310,314 voters (2025)

Area
  - Total: 105.53 km^{2} (40.75 sq mi)
- Elevation: 122 m (400 ft)
- Highest elevation: 1,179 m (3,868 ft)
- Lowest elevation: −1 m (−3.3 ft)

Population (2024 census)
  - Total: 685,688
  - Density: 6,497.6/km^{2} (16,829/sq mi)
  - Households: 156,871
- Demonym: San Joseño

Economy
  - Income class: 1st city income class
  - Poverty incidence: 12.44% (2023)
  - Revenue: ₱ 2,945 million (2024)
  - Assets: ₱ 5,792 million (2024)
  - Expenditure: ₱ 2,852 million (2024)
  - Liabilities: ₱ 1,201 million (2024)

Utilities
  - Electricity: Manila Electric Company (Meralco)
  - Water: San Jose del Monte City Water District
- Time zone: UTC+8 (PST)
- ZIP Code: 3023, 3024
- PSGC: 0301420000
- IDD : area code: +63 (0)44
- Native languages: Tagalog
- Catholic diocese: Diocese of Malolos
- Website: csjdm.gov.ph

San Jose del Monte (SJDM), officially the City of San Jose del Monte (Tagalog: Lungsod ng San José del Monte; Tagalog pronunciation: [ˌsɐn hoˌsɛ dɛl ˈmonte]), is a component city in the province of Bulacan, Philippines. According to the 2024 census, it has a population of 685,688 people, making it the largest local government unit within the province of Bulacan and Central Luzon, and the 18th most populated city in the Philippines.

It was proclaimed as a component city on 10 September 2000, through Republic Act No. 8797. Its conversion into a highly urbanized city was by virtue of Proclamation No. 1057 issued by President Rodrigo Duterte on 4 December 2020; the conversion was rejected on a referendum held on 30 October 2022, by the voters of Bulacan including the concerned city.

San José del Monte derived its name from Saint Joseph, whose statue was found in a veritable forest. The hunters called it as such, which means “Saint Joseph of the Mountain” in Spanish.

== History ==
Early accounts of the founding of the city, as gathered from the old people, contend that it was formerly a part of the town of Meycauayan. This is supported by a decree from the Archbishop of Manila dated March 1750 on the creation of new municipalities. The municipality of San Jose del Monte was then officially founded on 2 March 1752.

The decree included the list of families who volunteered to be relocated. These families, most if not all from Lagulo (now Malhacan) in Meycauayan, brought with them rice, wine, nganga, and salt in exchange for the wild pigs, deer, yantok, and almasigan of the Itas and Dumagats, the native inhabitants of the area. Solares, including intended lots for main roads, were peacefully distributed to the new occupants after being measured and surveyed.

In all probability, the hunters reported their findings to the parish priest of Meycauayan. It was said that the priest built a stone church at the site where the town proper is now located. The statue was installed in the new church. Extant Catholic Church records reveal that the first parish priest was Father Antonio de Moral. He took charge of the parish in 1845.

During the revolt against Spain, the town became a battleground between the Katipuneros and the Spanish forces. The revolutionaries lost and the vengeful Spanish soldiers burned down the settlement. The townspeople fled for their lives to nearby towns. At the advent of American rule, it was made a part of Santa Maria until 1918 when the town was recreated and Ciriaco Gallardo appointed the first municipal president. Public schools were opened at the start of the American regime but due to the scarcity of the population, the highest grade organized was at the fourth grade.

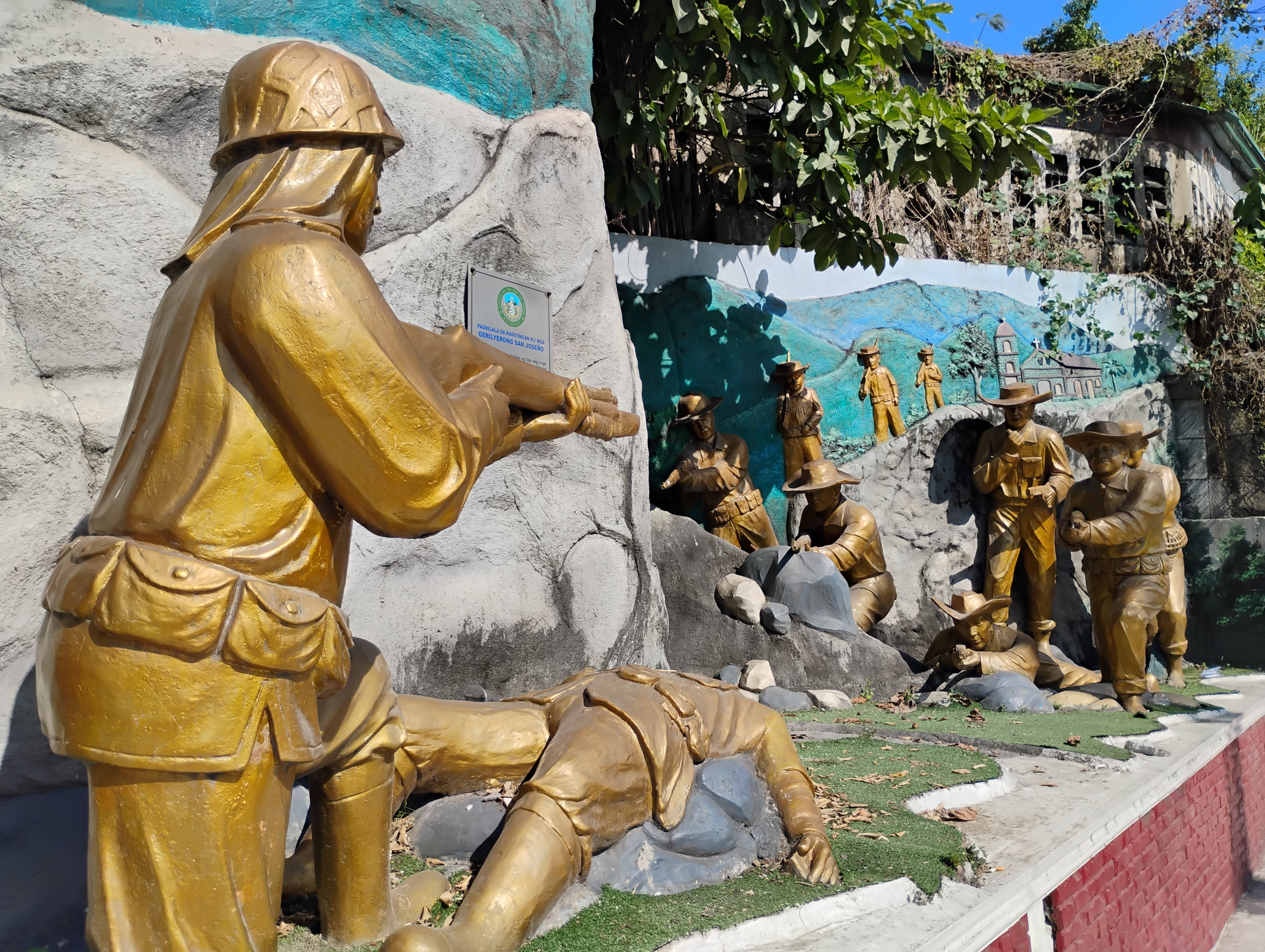
Gerilyerong San Joseño monument, which symbolizes the locals' resilience during the Japanese occupation

During the Japanese occupation, the town became an ideal hiding place for the locally recognized guerrillas because of the town's hilly and wooden terrain. The Japanese Imperial Army took over the local government of San Jose del Monte from 1942 to 1943. In resistance, the municipality formed its guerrilla unit. San Jose del Monte experienced large casualties when the Americans bombed the town center on 11 January 1945, and again on 14 January 1945. When the combined Filipino and American troops came, peace reigned but not for long.

At the height of the Hukbalahap Rebellion, the town was raided on 10 October 1950. The Huks burned down the town hall. The town was raided for the second time on 21 March 1951. The Huks did not succeed because of the precautionary measures instituted by the town officials after which the Huks were gradually eliminated.

In the 1980s, thousands of informal settlers from Metro Manila were relocated to San Jose del Monte. Due to the large number of residents, Bulacan Governor Roberto Pagdanganan recalled in 1996 that the relocation did not ensure new livelihoods for its informal settlers, thus turning many squatters toward criminality; he noted that the town had the highest crime rate in the province according to police reports.

In 1988, Eduardo Roquero was elected mayor of the municipality by a margin of eight votes against his closest opponent, reelectionist Reynaldo Villano.

=== Cityhood ===
==== 2000 plebiscite and later events ====
In December 1999, congressman Angelito Sarmiento filed the bill converting the then municipality of San Jose del Monte into a component city. This was approved on July 15, 2000 as Republic Act No. 8797.

San Jose del Monte cityhood plebiscite
Choice	Votes	%
For	20,331	62.30
Against	12,304	37.70
Total	32,635	100.00
Valid votes	32,635	100.00
Invalid/blank votes	0	0.00
Total votes	32,635	100.00
Registered voters/turnout	120,380	27.11

A plebiscite was held on September 10, 2000. Despite a low turnout, the cityhood was approved mostly by migrants, mainly from Metro Manila which composed 70% of the residents by then; only nine of the 59 villages voted against the bill. The official proclamation was held in the evening. San Jose del Monte became the first city in Bulacan since Malolos failed in the cityhood bid in December 1999. Malolos was eventually declared a city in 2002 by the Commission on Elections which had reversed the official result following a recount. It was also recorded as the country's 86th chartered city.

Through RA No. 9230, amending the city charter and approved on December 18, 2003, the city was granted its own legislative district, the province's first lone district, while barangays were classified into two districts for purposes of representation in the Sangguniang Panlungsod. Officers were first elected in 2004.

==== Highly urbanized city ====
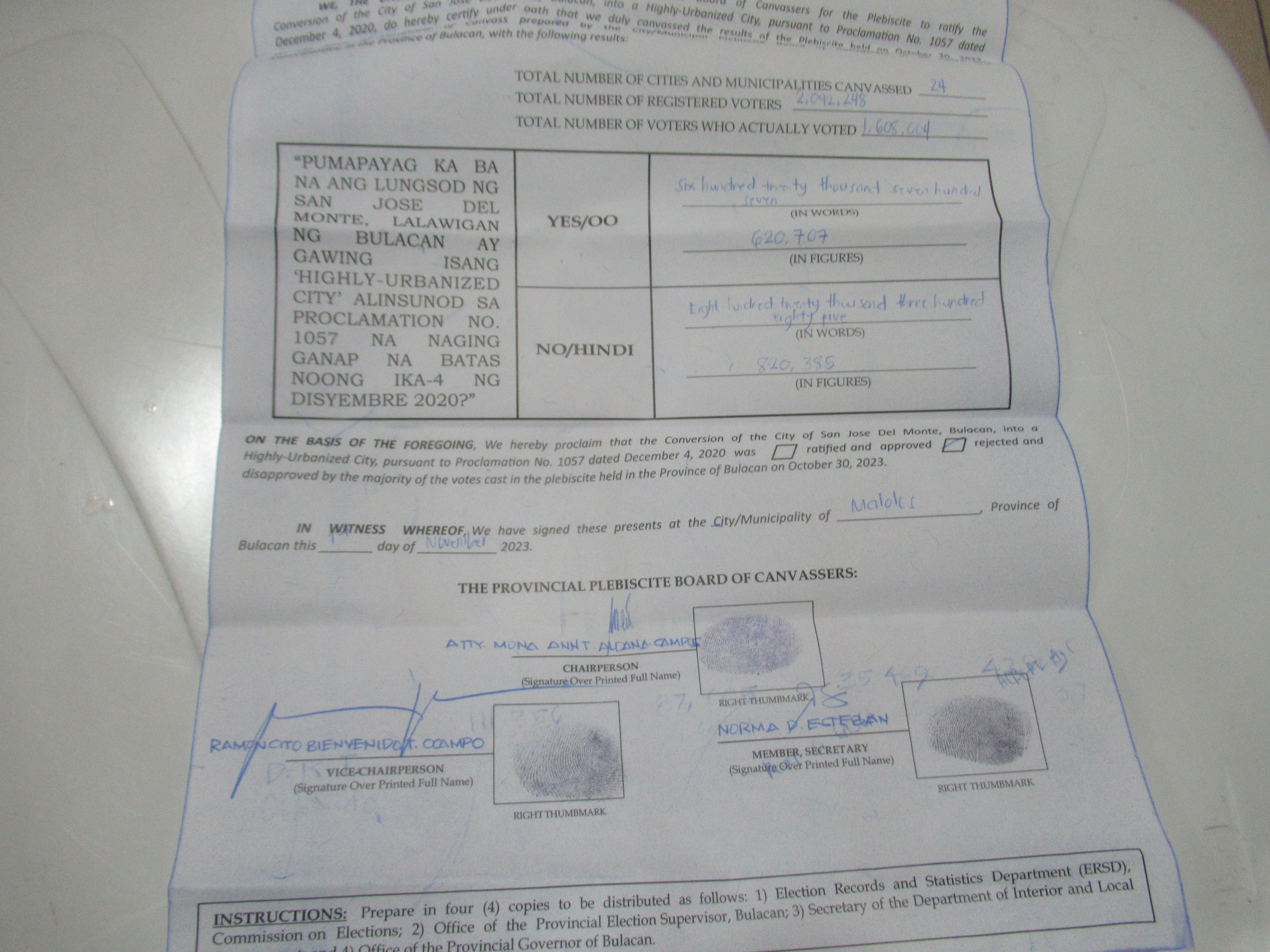
Certificate of Canvass of Votes and Proclamation

On 4 December 2020, President Rodrigo Duterte declared San Jose del Monte as a highly urbanized city through Proclamation No. 1057. However, it required a plebiscite to ratify its city charter. It was supposed to be held four months after the 2022 general elections but was not held. Hence, the proclamation remained pending. On 11 September 2023, COMELEC released a resolution that synchronized the plebiscite on 30 October 2023, along with the barangay and Sangguniang Kabataan elections.

The majority of voters in the Province of Bulacan rejected the conversion, as declared by the COMELEC two days after the plebiscite. Meanwhile, a tenth of those who joined did not vote, leaving blank ballots.

== Geography ==
The elevation of the city ranges from approximately 40 to 900 meters (130 to 2,950 ft) above sea level; the relief transitions from warm lowland to cool upland as one goes eastward. This is because the city is part of the Sierra Madre mountain range. Plains and river valley flats characterize the western and southwestern quadrant. The central portion and much of its eastern section are made up of undulating hills with low relief. High relief areas and moderate slopes best describe its extreme eastern and northwestern quadrant. Slopes of 3%-8% are extensively found in the city, particularly in the western half. Slopes of 30%-50% comprise the smallest portion of the total land area.

The rivers and creeks that flow in San Jose del Monte are from the Sierra Madre mountain range. Major natural waterways of San Jose del Monte are the Kipungok, Santo Cristo, and Santa Maria River systems. Kipungok River separates San Jose del Monte from Caloocan and Rodriguez. It is directly connected to the Marilao River, which flows downwards to Manila Bay. Draining to these rivers are creeks and streams, which act as catchment areas for the surface water runoff of the city. Among these are the Bigte, Kantulot, Katinga, and Salamin creeks.

Located in the southeast of the province, it is bordered by the cities of Caloocan and Quezon City in Metro Manila to the south, by the municipality of Rodríguez in Rizal to the east, the municipalities of Santa María and Marilao to the west and Norzagaray to the north. San Jose del Monte is 65 kilometres (40 mi) from Malolos and 30 kilometres (19 mi) from Manila.

The city is home to some of the biggest resettlement areas in the Philippines like the Sapang Palay resettlement area spread over 36 barangays in second district, Pabahay 2000 in Barangay Muzon South, San Jose Del Monte Heights in Barangay Muzon East, Towerville I-V in Barangay Minuyan Proper, and Towerville VI in Barangay Gaya-Gaya. Most of the city's population come from former informal settlers along the creeks, esteros, riverbanks and railway tracks of Metro Manila. Many private residential subdivisions have also been established in the city.

=== General Land Use ===
Growing commercial, residential, and light industrial areas, are found all over the city at major road intersections and along major thoroughfares. However, the bulk of San Jose del Monte's built-up areas are mostly west of Quirino Highway at the primary level to gently sloping 8% terrain, dividing the city into a heavily built-up western section and the largely agricultural eastern section. Most of the city's schools, government institutions, commercial developments, industries, and other urban amenities are in this section. The largest contiguous built-up area is at Sapang Palay Resettlement Project area, followed by the conurbation in Tungkong Mangga and Muzon.

The developments east of the Quirino Highway are mostly scattered residential areas and agricultural lands. However, there are a few subdivisions that are some distance away from Ciudad Real and take advantage of its secluded and rural atmosphere. These are the Blessed Sacrament Seminary and an Augustinian convent.

In between the built-up clusters are pockets of agricultural lands, which are continuously converted into built-up uses. Planted in these lands are crops such as rice and corn. The clustering pattern for both built-up and agricultural uses is partly due to the decisions made by settlers about the hilly conditions that dominate the topography. Most households in the western half of San Jose del Monte opted to convert their lands to residential uses while others maintained the farms. This left upland uses, such as those about forest use, more common towards the easternmost zones.

Most vegetative outgrowths are in areas that are difficult to build on. But there are instances when these outgrowths are integrated into the built-up areas, usually found in the West: several heavily vegetated areas. Supplementing these are mini forest projects of the city government. The City Agriculture Office maintains a 1.65-hectare (4.1-acre) Mini Forest Project in Barangay Muzon along the San Jose del Monte–Marilao Road and a mahogany planting site.

=== Climate ===
Climate data for San Jose del Monte City, Bulacan
Month	Jan	Feb	Mar	Apr	May	Jun	Jul	Aug	Sep	Oct	Nov	Dec	Year
Mean daily maximum °C (°F)	29 (84)	30 (86)	32 (90)	34 (93)	33 (91)	31 (88)	30 (86)	29 (84)	29 (84)	30 (86)	30 (86)	29 (84)	31 (87)
Mean daily minimum °C (°F)	20 (68)	20 (68)	21 (70)	23 (73)	24 (75)	25 (77)	24 (75)	24 (75)	24 (75)	23 (73)	22 (72)	21 (70)	23 (73)
Average precipitation mm (inches)	7 (0.3)	7 (0.3)	9 (0.4)	21 (0.8)	101 (4.0)	152 (6.0)	188 (7.4)	170 (6.7)	159 (6.3)	115 (4.5)	47 (1.9)	29 (1.1)	1,005 (39.7)
Average rainy days	3.3	3.5	11.1	8.1	18.9	23.5	26.4	25.5	24.5	19.6	10.4	6.4	181.2
Source: Meteoblue

=== Barangays ===
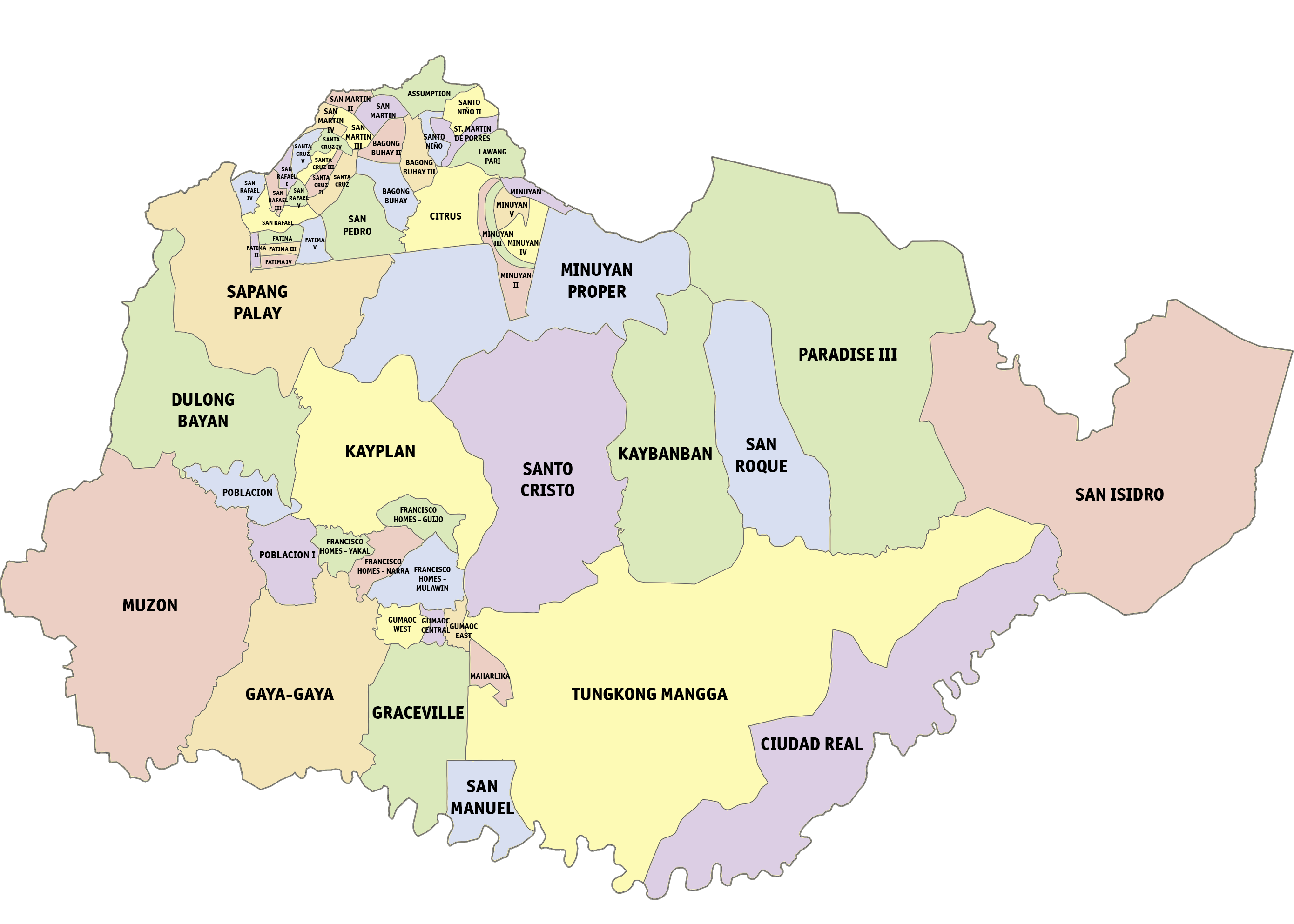
Political Map of San Jose del Monte (prior to the split of Barangay Muzon in 2023)

San Jose del Monte is politically subdivided into 62 barangays, as shown in the matrix below. Each barangay consists of puroks and some have sitios.

It was originally made up of only five barangays: Población, Halang (Muzon), Sapang Palay, Santo Cristo, and Gaya-Gaya. Over time, these five mother barangays were divided to provide better accommodation for the people, particularly in the Sapang Palay Resettlement Area (Hacienda de Sapang Palay), which stretches to Minuyan.

There is an ongoing land dispute with the municipality of Norzagaray, Bulacan regarding both territories. Such disputes can be located in the upper portion of Assumption, the eastern portion of Santo Niño II, the eastern portion of San Martín de Porres, the eastern portion of Lawang Pari, the eastern portion of Minuyan Proper, Kaybanban, San Roque, Paradise III, San Isidro, the upper portion of Tungkong Mangga, the upper portion of Ciudad Real barangays in San José del Monte and lower portion of Tigbe, the lower portion of Bitungol, the lower portion of Minuyan, lower portion of Bigte, lower portion of San Mateo (Sitio Karahume), mountainous portion of San Lorenzo in Norzagaray.

Historical maps of Bulacan, before the creation of Doña Remedios Trinidad, indicate that both territories of San José del Monte and Norzagaray stretch up to Tayabas province.

These barangays are grouped into two districts, the first with a ZIP Code of 3023, and the second with 3024. Twenty-six (26) barangays comprise the first district while the 36 barangays located in Sapang Palay compose the second district.

The city's former administrative center was located in Población 1, which is now transferred to Dulong Bayan, which is now the city's new seat of government. San Jose del Monte has 4 major urban centers, called nodes: Muzon node (consisting of the four barangays of Muzon), Poblacion node (consisting of the two barangays of Población), Sapang Palay node (consisting of the barangays surrounding Sampol Market), and Tungkong Mangga node.

The most recently created barangays are Muzon Proper, Muzon East, Muzon West, and Muzon South created by dividing Barangay Muzon. The four barangays were made through the approval of a law on 25 March 2023 through a referendum.

Barangay	District	Population	Area (in ha.)	Density (per ha.)	ZIP Code
Ciudad Real	First	1,826	1414	1	3023
Dulong Bayan	First	11,008	407.5	27	3023
Francisco Homes-Guijo	First	6,972	44.58	156	3023
Francisco Homes-Mulawin	First	11,226	82.01	137	3023
Francisco Homes-Narra	First	8,293	45.57	182	3023
Francisco Homes-Yakal	First	3,721	31.66	118	3023
Gaya-Gaya	First	56,896	511.3	111	3023
Graceville	First	42,207	254.5	166	3023
Gumaoc Central	First	4,123	11.23	367	3023
Gumaoc East	First	5,376	13.7	392	3023
Gumaoc West	First	8,885	31.29	284	3023
Kaybanban	First	3,245	401.1	8	3023
Kaypian	First	46,045	464.6	99	3023
Maharlika	First	3,057	24.63	124	3023
Muzon East	First	127,506	959.6	133	3023
Muzon Proper	First	127,506	959.6	133	3023
Muzon West	First	127,506	959.6	133	3023
Muzon South	First	127,506	959.6	133	3023
Paradise III	First	5,318	1,108	5	3023
Población	First	2,273	62.94	36	3023
Población I	First	5,617	83.86	67	3023
San Isidro	First	4,282	1134	4	3023
San Manuel	First	11,432	92.52	124	3023
San Roque	First	2,492	268.4	9	3023
Santo Cristo	First	49,579	769.2	64	3023
Tungkong Mangga	First	16,324	1652	10	3023
Sapang Palay Proper	Second	5,804	432.0	13	3024
Area A - Minuyan Proper	Second	46,171	810.2	57	3024
Area A - Minuyan I	Second	3,333	14.52	230	3024
Area A - Minuyan II	Second	5,977	8.025	745	3024
Area A - Minuyan III	Second	2,673	16.84	159	3024
Area A - Minuyan IV	Second	4,769	33.82	141	3024
Area A - Minuyan V	Second	2,200	14.38	153	3024
Area B - Bagong Buhay I	Second	7,264	42.92	169	3024
Area B - Bagong Buhay II	Second	4,175	26.81	156	3024
Area B - Bagong Buhay III	Second	5,698	20.08	284	3024
Area C - San Martín I	Second	4,095	20.63	198	3024
Area C - San Martín II	Second	3,527	10.22	345	3024
Area C - San Martín III	Second	3,695	12.14	304	3024
Area C - San Martín IV	Second	4,085	15.81	258	3024
Area D - Santa Cruz I	Second	4,854	22.43	216	3024
Area D - Santa Cruz II	Second	3,405	9.938	342	3024
Area D - Santa Cruz III	Second	3,029	10.20	297	3024
Area D - Santa Cruz IV	Second	3,175	14.36	221	3024
Area D - Santa Cruz V	Second	3,811	7.942	480	3024
Area E - Fátima I	Second	3,109	10.1	308	3024
Area E - Fátima II	Second	1,890	6.423	294	3024
Area E - Fátima III	Second	1,922	5.915	325	3024
Area E - Fátima IV	Second	2,121	8.337	254	3024
Area E - Fátima V	Second	2,195	20.96	105	3024
Area F - San Pedro	Second	16,439	77.15	213	3024
Area G - Citrus	Second	22,893	89.76	255	3024
Area H - San Rafael I	Second	3,362	26.27	128	3024
Area H - San Rafael II	Second	8,139	9.617	846	3024
Area H - San Rafael III	Second	2,718	10.35	263	3024
Area H - San Rafael IV	Second	6,447	16.50	391	3024
Area H - San Rafael V	Second	2,844	6.798	418	3024
Area I - Assumption	Second	4,362	24.68	177	3024
Area I - Lawang Pari	Second	5,075	26.82	189	3024
Area I - Santo Niño I	Second	2,610	24.16	108	3024
Area I - Santo Niño II	Second	3,746	20.60	182	3024
Area I - San Martín de Porres	Second	2,470	18.48	134	3024

== Demographics ==
Population census of San Jose del Monte
Year	Pop.	±% p.a.
1903	1,378	—
1918	3,141	+5.65%
1939	5,826	+2.99%
1948	5,363	−0.92%
1960	9,329	+4.72%
1970	18,704	+7.19%
1975	59,021	+25.92%
1980	90,732	+8.98%
1990	142,047	+4.59%
1995	201,394	+6.76%
2000	315,807	+10.12%
2007	439,090	+4.65%
2010	454,553	+1.27%
2015	574,089	+4.55%
2020	651,813	+2.71%
2024	685,688	+1.22%
Source: Philippine Statistics Authority

In the 2020 census, the population of San Jose del Monte was 651,813 people, with a density of 6,200 inhabitants per square kilometer or 16,000 inhabitants per square mile. This makes it the largest local government unit in Bulacan province. It is also the largest city in Central Luzon (Region III).

With the coming of settlers to San Jose del Monte, its population increased tremendously. Its population increased dramatically since the 1950s as the population tended to move from rural areas to towns and cities. Its proximity to Manila allowed it to accommodate its spillover population. This is further hastened by the development of nearby Quezon City and the accompanying increase in population and infrastructure.

The forced relocation of informal settlers and the lure of government to provide them with their own homes allowed the town to continue to grow despite the lack of government facilities. As such, San Jose del Monte exhibited an increasing percentage share of the provincial population from as low as 2% in 1960 to 9% in 1990 and then to 17% in 2015. The town surpassed the population of Meycauayan in the 1980 census and Malolos in the 1990 census, then the largest towns of Bulacan. By 2015, it has more than two times the population of the now second place Santa María town (256,454 people in the 2015 Census).

If current population growth holds (2010-2015, +4.55%), the population of San Jose del Monte is expected to double and breach one million by the 2030 Census.

=== Languages ===
The city, along with the municipalities of San Miguel, Doña Remedios Trinidad, and Norzagaray, is the homeland of the Dumagat Kabuloan or Alta Kabuloan, the first inhabitants of Bulacan, with a language named exactly as their people. Their language is currently endangered and is in dire need of local government intervention. The majority of residents in the town are native speakers of the Tagalog language.

== Economy ==
Poverty incidence of San Jose del Monte (%)

Source: Philippine Statistics Authority

=== Agriculture ===
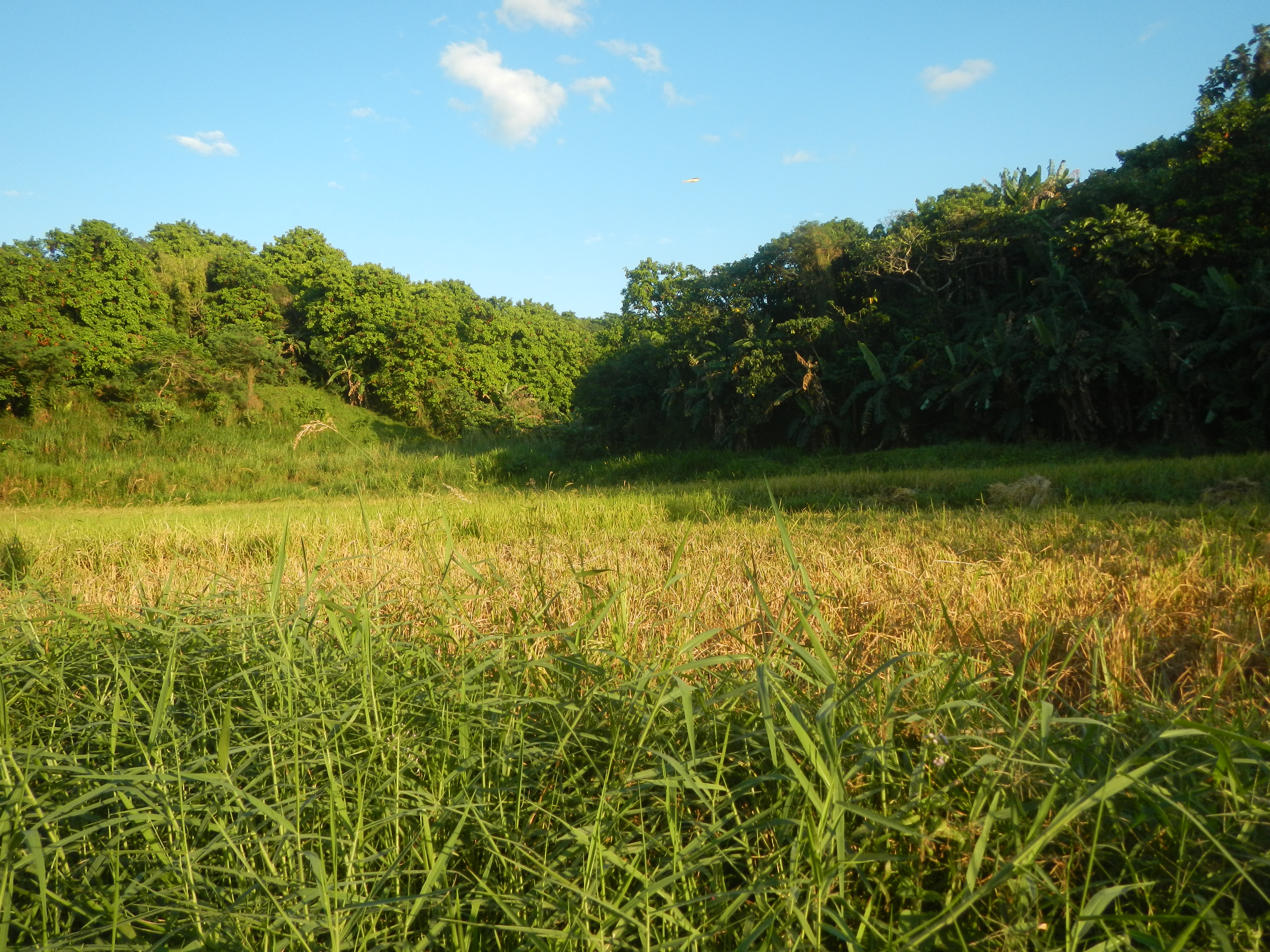
Paddy field in San Jose del Monte

Major crops are leafy vegetables, root crops (cassava as its OTOP), pineapple, mango, and coffee beans.

=== Livestock and poultry ===
The major income earner is large- and small-scale swine production. There are 60 commercial livestock and poultry farms in the city. The major poultry producers are RFM Corporation, Vitarich, and FELDAN.

=== Trade and commerce ===
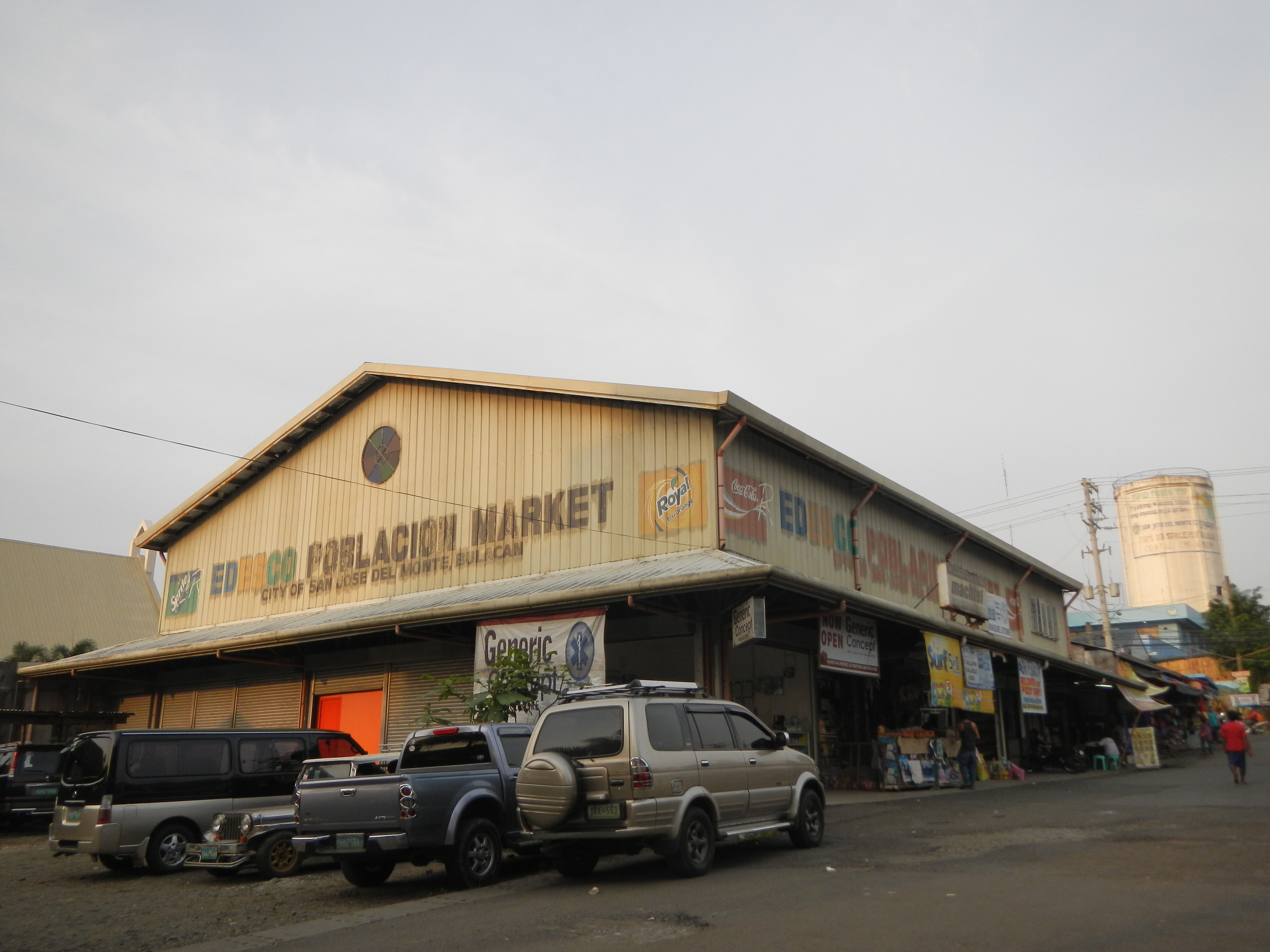
Poblacion Public Market

The city has three major business district growth areas: Tungkong Mangga, Muzon, and Sapang Palay (Sampol). They are in wholesale and retail trade.

The minor business districts include Towerville in Minuyan Proper, Palmera in Kaypian, Northgate in Santo Cristo, Citrus, Poblacion 1, Grotto in Graceville, Francisco Homes, Gumaoc, and San Rafael III.

Commercial and thrift banks, pawnshops, and cooperatives provide financial services. There are two major malls: Starmall San Jose del Monte in Palmera and SM City San Jose del Monte in Tungkong Mangga.

=== Tourism ===
- Mount Balagbag and Kaytitinga Falls (Barangay San Isidro) are the main tourist attractions in the city. A portion of the Angat Watershed Forest Reserve also extends to San Jose del Monte.
- VS Orchids Farm (Santo Cristo) is the biggest orchids nursery and ornamental plants farm in Bulacan owned by Rolita Spowart, 3 Manila Seedling Bank Foundation, Quezon City. Hundreds of orchids species are nurtured in this 1.8 hectars flora haven.
- The Our Lady of Lourdes Grotto Shrine (Graceville) is a Roman Catholic pilgrimage site often visited by devotees during Holy Week.
- Saint Joseph the Worker Parish Church (Poblacion 1) is the main historical pilgrimage site in the heart of the city.
- People's Park of San Jose del Monte (Sapang Palay Proper)
- River Park Esplanade (Dulong Bayan)
- The Rising Heart and Padre Pio Mountain of Healing (Paradise III)
- Grotto Vista Resort (Graceville)
- Los Arcos de Hermano Resort and Events (Tungkong Mangga)
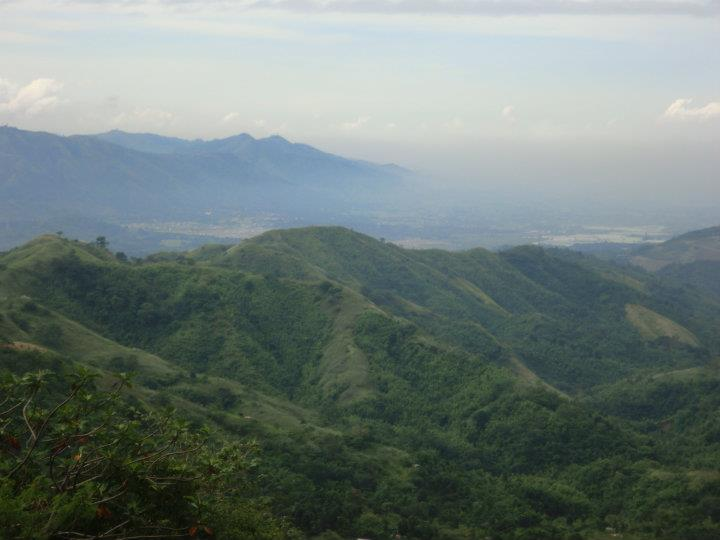
Mount Balagbag

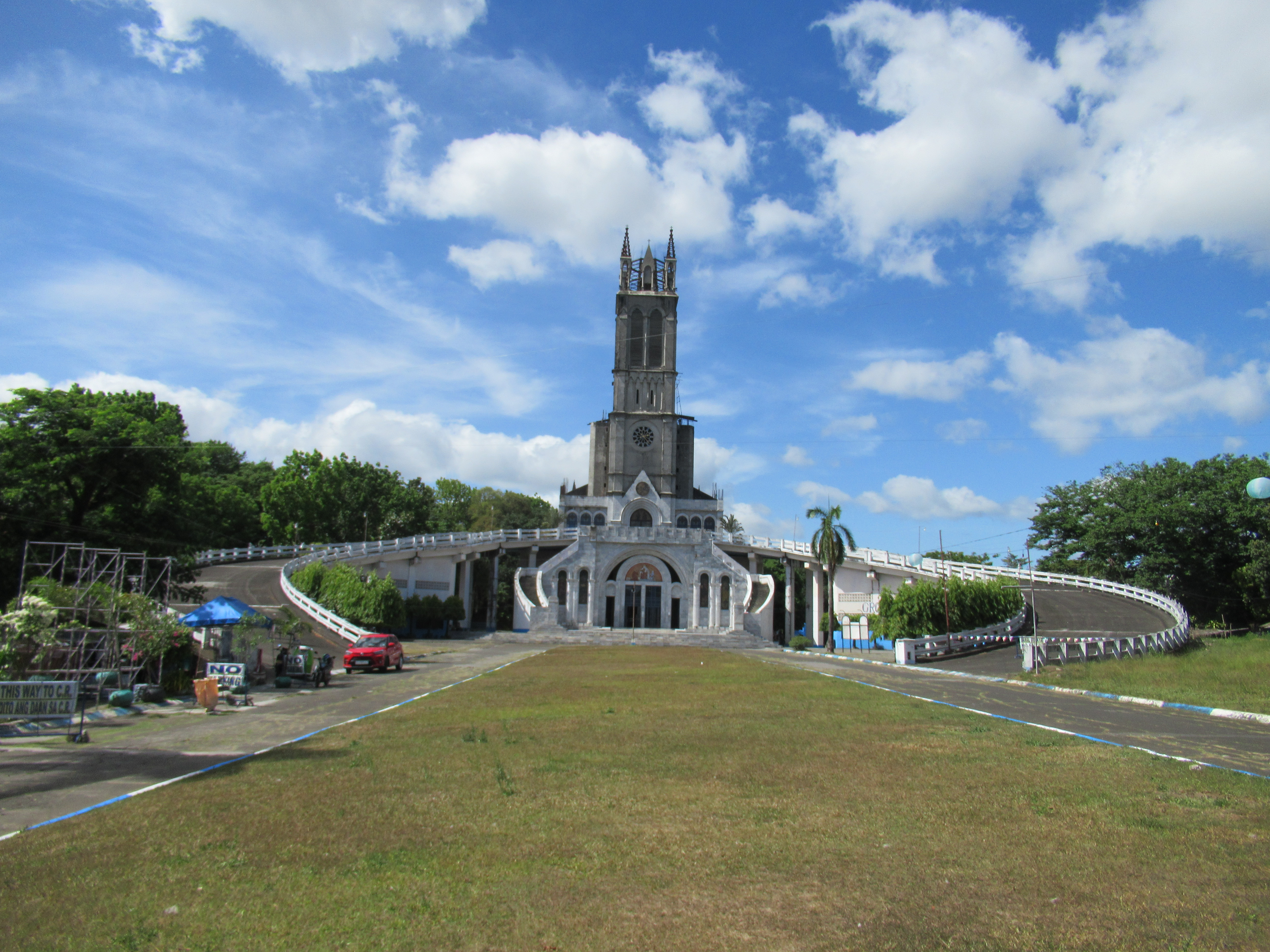
Grotto of Our Lady of Lourdes

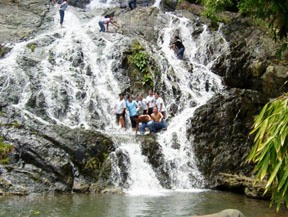
Kaytitinga Falls

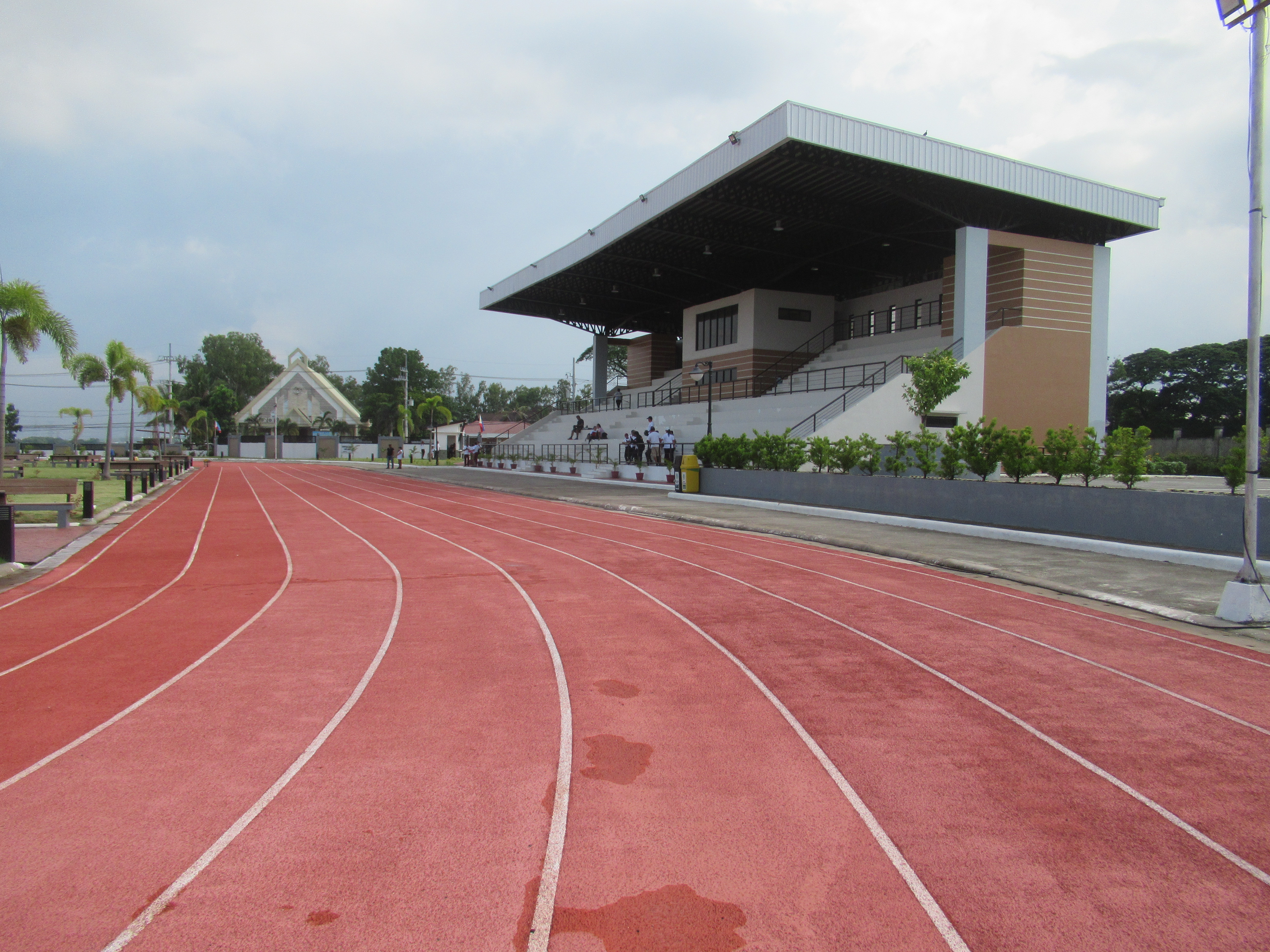
San Jose del Monte People's Park & Sports Complex

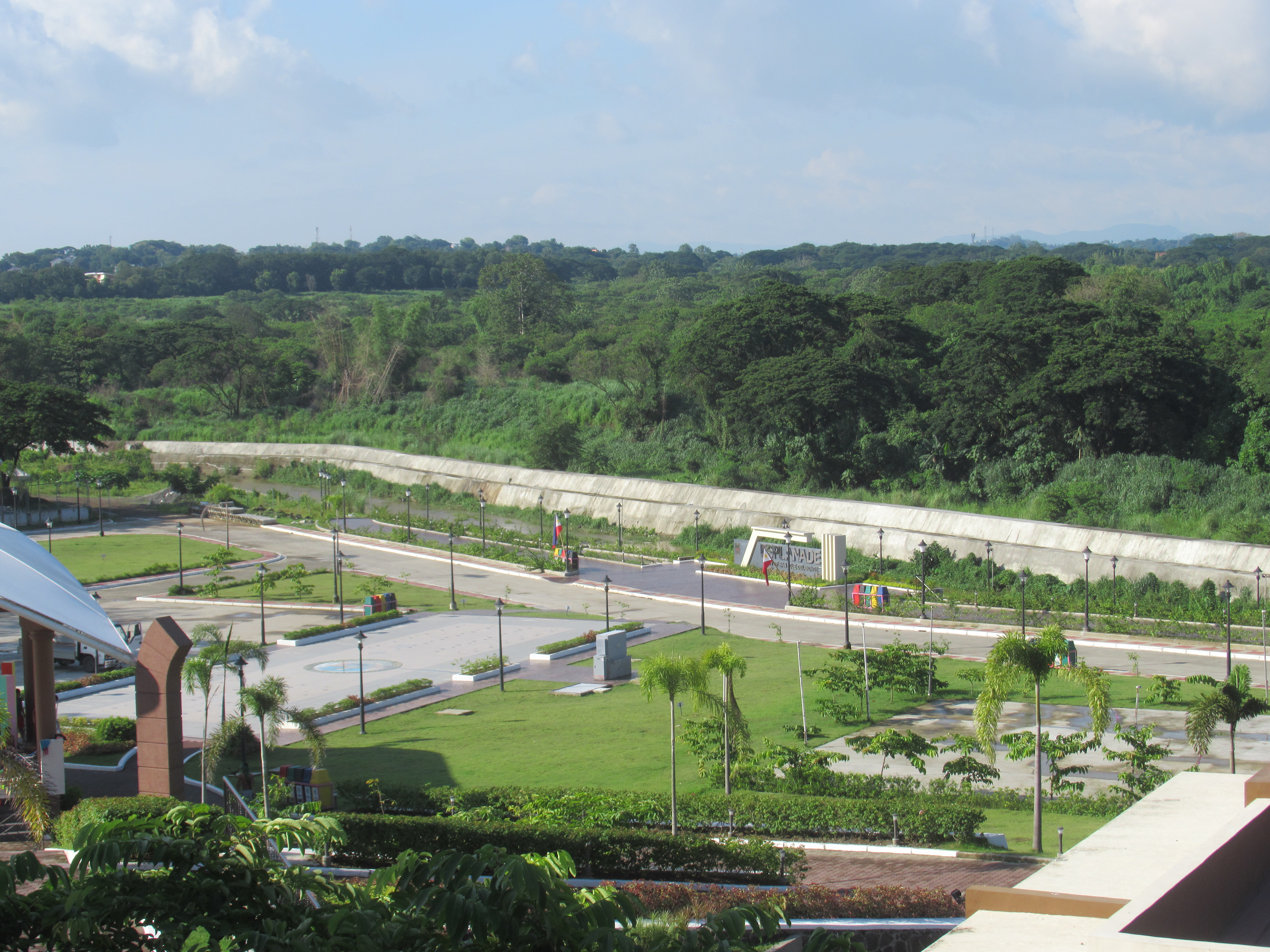
San Jose del Monte City River Park Esplanade

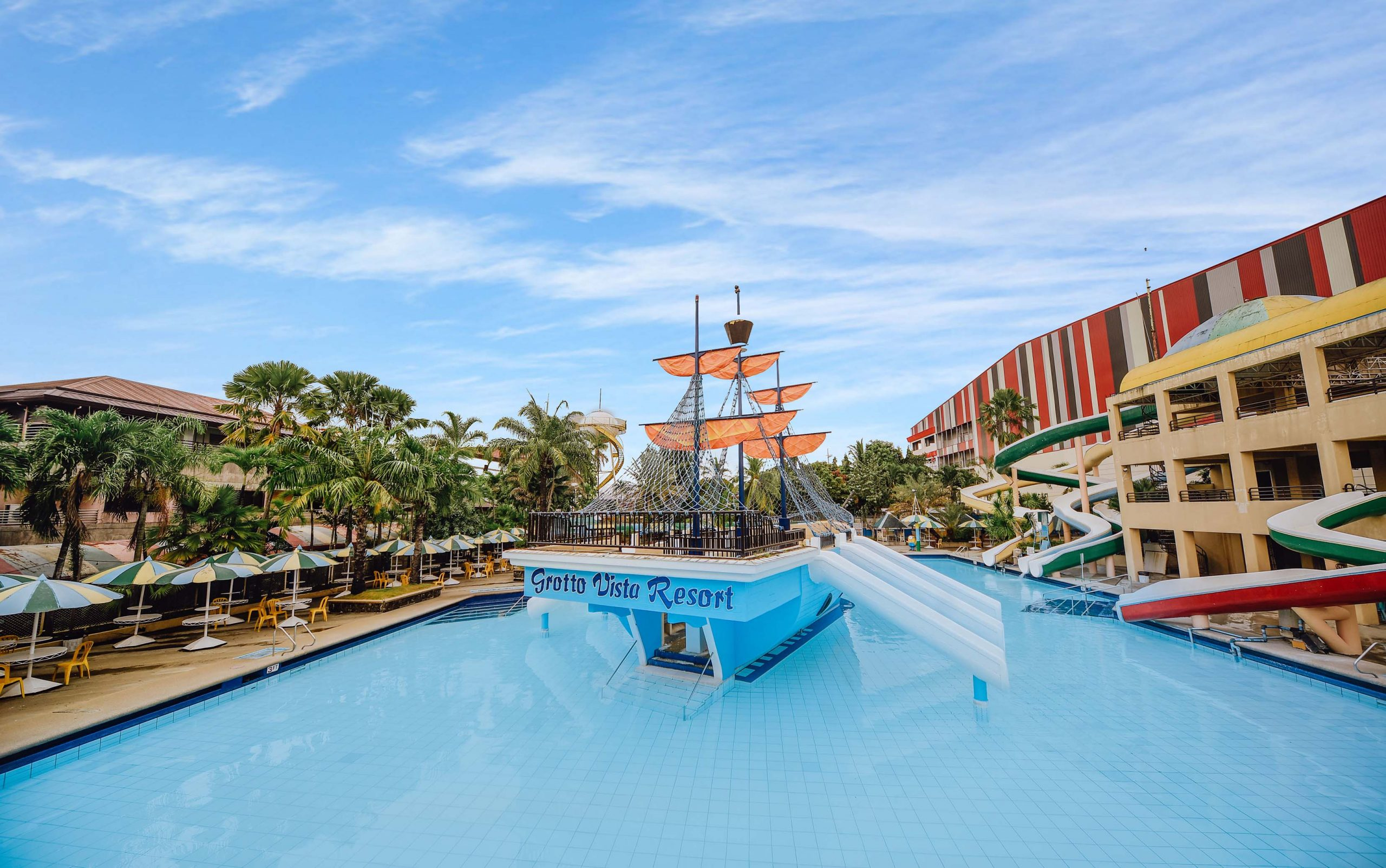
Grotto Vista Resort

== Infrastructure ==
=== Transportation ===
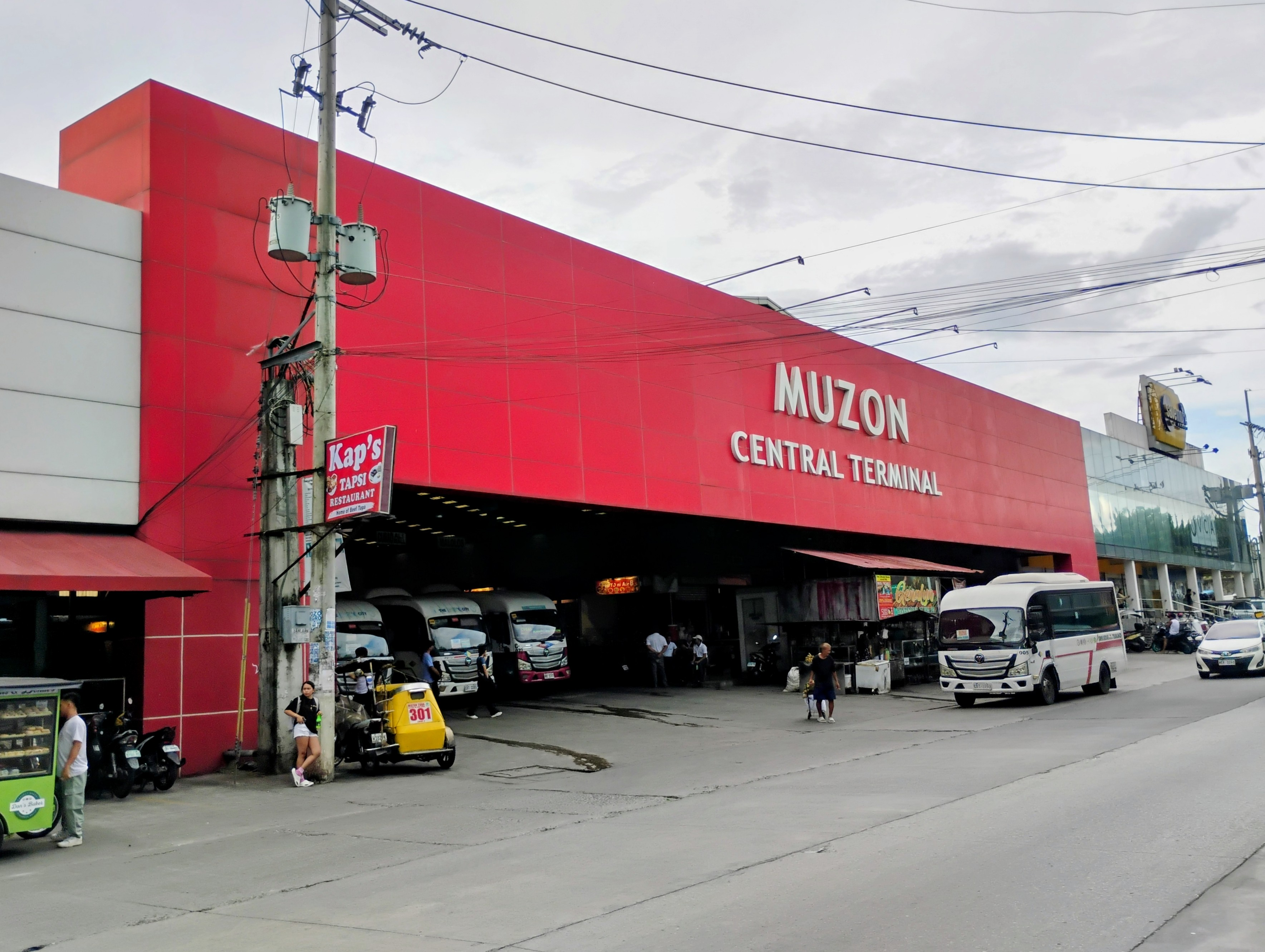
Muzon Central Terminal

The city is serviced by bus routes going to and from Parañaque (PITX), Santa Cruz in Manila, Quezon City, and Ninoy Aquino International Airport. Jeepney, modern-jeepney, and minibus routes also ply the roads between the city and neighboring cities and towns in Metro Manila and Bulacan.

==== Road Network ====
San Jose del Monte's road network has a total length of 211.43 kilometers (131.38 mi). The following are the main arteries of San Jose del Monte's road network which link the 59 barangays with Metro Manila and the rest of Bulacan.

- Quirino Highway is a national road that stretches from the town of Norzagaray (Bigte Rotonda) to Quezon City (Balintawak).
- Bocaue–San Jose Road, also called Gov. Fortunato Halili Avenue, is a provincial road that links the city from Quirino Highway in Tungkong Mangga (Tungko) via Gaya-Gaya and Muzon to the town of Santa María, Bocaue and to the North Luzon Expressway.
- Sapang Palay–Santa Maria Road links the Sapang Palay Resettlement Project to the town of Santa María passing through Barangay Bulac, Barangay Catmon, and Barangay San José Patag in the said town.
- San Jose–Marilao Road, also referred to as Miguel Villarica Road, and formerly, but still used commonly, Carriedo Street, links the city from Poblacion San Jose, passing through Muzon with the municipality of Marilao and to the North Luzon Expressway.
- Dr. Eduardo V. Roquero Avenue links the Sapang Palay Resettlement Project to Quirino Highway and in the opposite end in San Jose-Norzagaray Road in Sapang Palay Proper.
- San Jose-Norzagaray Road, is a provincial road that links the Poblacion San Jose via Dulong Bayan and Sapang Palay Proper to the town of Norzagaray passing through Barangay Tigbe in Norzagaray.
- Igay Provincial Road connects Quirino Highway to Rodríguez, Rizal, passing through Santo Cristo, Kaybanban, San Roque, Paradise III, and San Isidro.
- Kaypian Road connects San Jose-Norzagaray Road in Barangay Dulong Bayan to Starmall–San Jose del Monte via Barangay Kaypian and links to Quirino Highway.
- Circumferential Road 6 (C6) bypasses the city of San Jose del Monte that the project initially would link Metro Manila with the provinces of Bulacan in the north, Rizal in the east, and Cavite in the south via Phase 2, passing through the cities of Pasig, Taguig, and Muntinlupa.
- North Luzon East Expressway (NLEE) bypasses through the city of San Jose del Monte and connects to Cabanatuan in Nueva Ecija.

==== Railway Network ====
The city is also the site of the under-preparation terminus of Manila Metro Rail Transit (MRT) Line 7. The initial location of the said station, named San Jose del Monte Station, would be located near the area of Colinas Verdes, a subdivision in Tungkong Mangga, San Jose del Monte, passing through Tala, North Caloocan, and barangay Ciudad Real.

However, due to the appeals the residents of Pangarap Village in Tala over years of land dispute and right-of-way issues, in 2021, the railway leading to the station was realigned, now passing through Quirino Highway instead of passing through the said disputed residential community, and the new site of San Jose del Monte station would now be located on a vast vacant lot alongside Skyline Hospital and Medical Center.

=== Water ===
The bulk of the city's water requirement is being served by the San José del Monte City Water District, together via Joint Venture Agreement to PrimeWater Corporation.

=== Power ===
Power distribution is being undertaken by the Manila Electric Company (Meralco). The city hosts the biggest National Grid Corporation of the Philippines (NGCP) sub-station in the country in Barangay Dulong Bayan.

=== Telecommunications/communications ===
Landline telephone systems are provided by the PLDT and Globe.

Internet service is available through SPC Cable Network, PLDT Home Fiber and DSL, Globe Fiber, Red fiber, Streamtech and Converge Fiber X.

Mobile telephone services are provided by Smart Communications, Globe Telecom, and Dito Telecommunity.

== Education ==
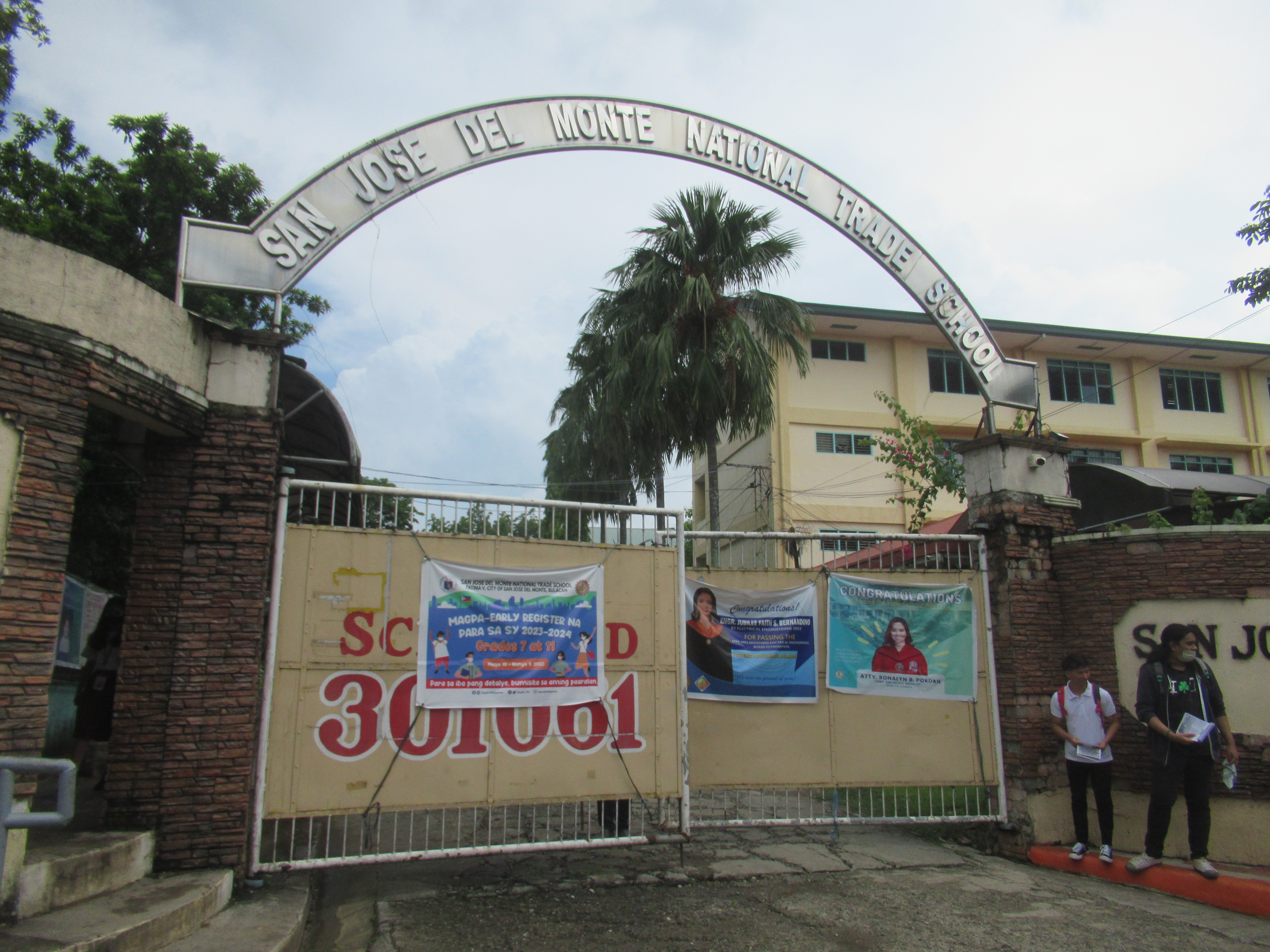
San Jose del Monte National Trade School

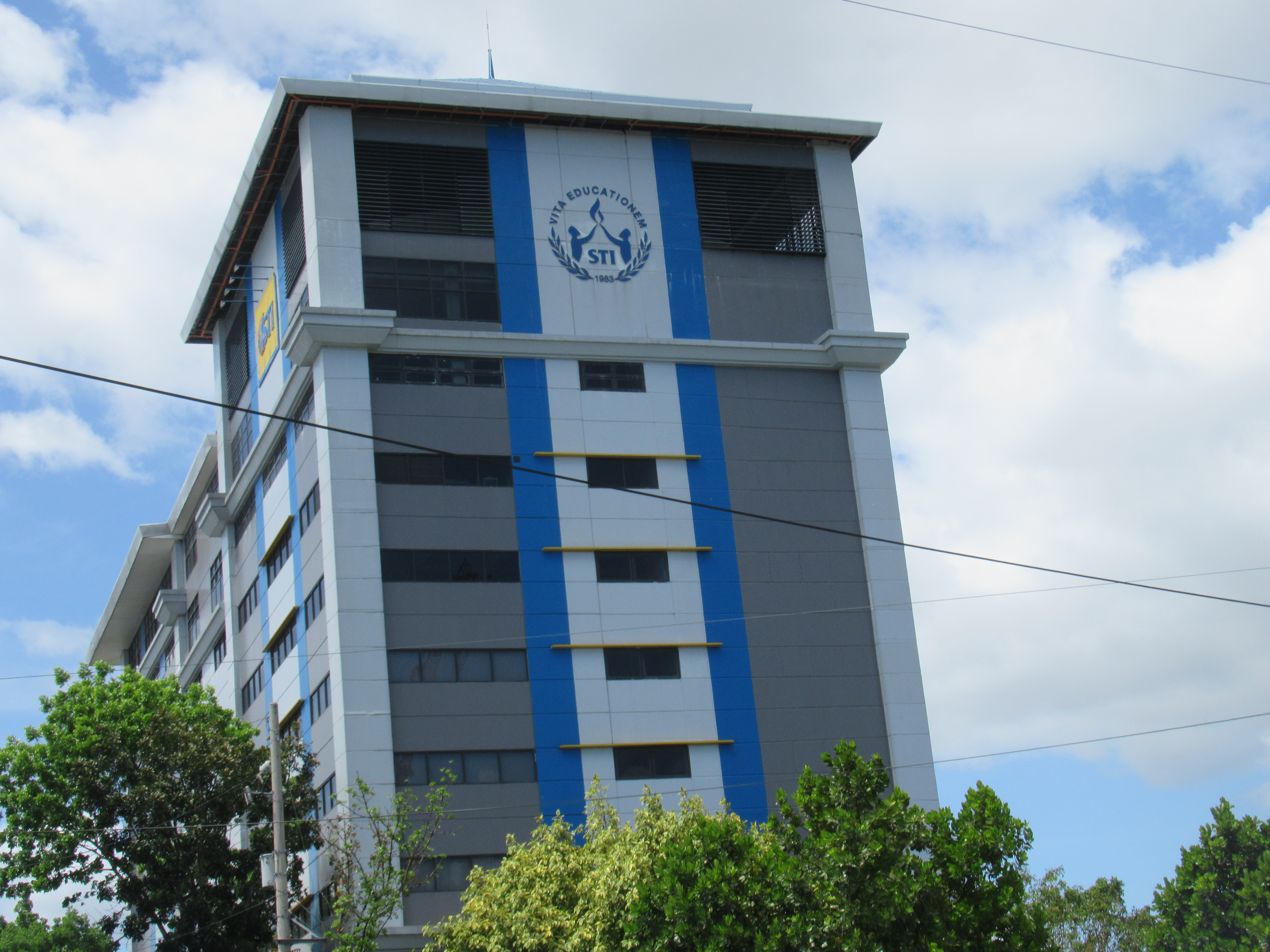
STI Academic Center San Jose Del Monte

=== Public Universities ===
- Bulacan State University, Sarmiento Campus

=== Colleges ===
- Bulacan Polytechnic College, San José del Monte Campus
- Bestlink College of the Philippines, Bulacan
- City College of San Jose del Monte
- Colegio de San Gabriel Arcangel
- Colegio San Agustin, Bulacan
- College of Saint Anthony
- First City Providential College
- Golden Valley Colleges
- Headwaters College
- Jesus the Greatest Name Christian College
- La Concepcion College
- Siena College of San Jose
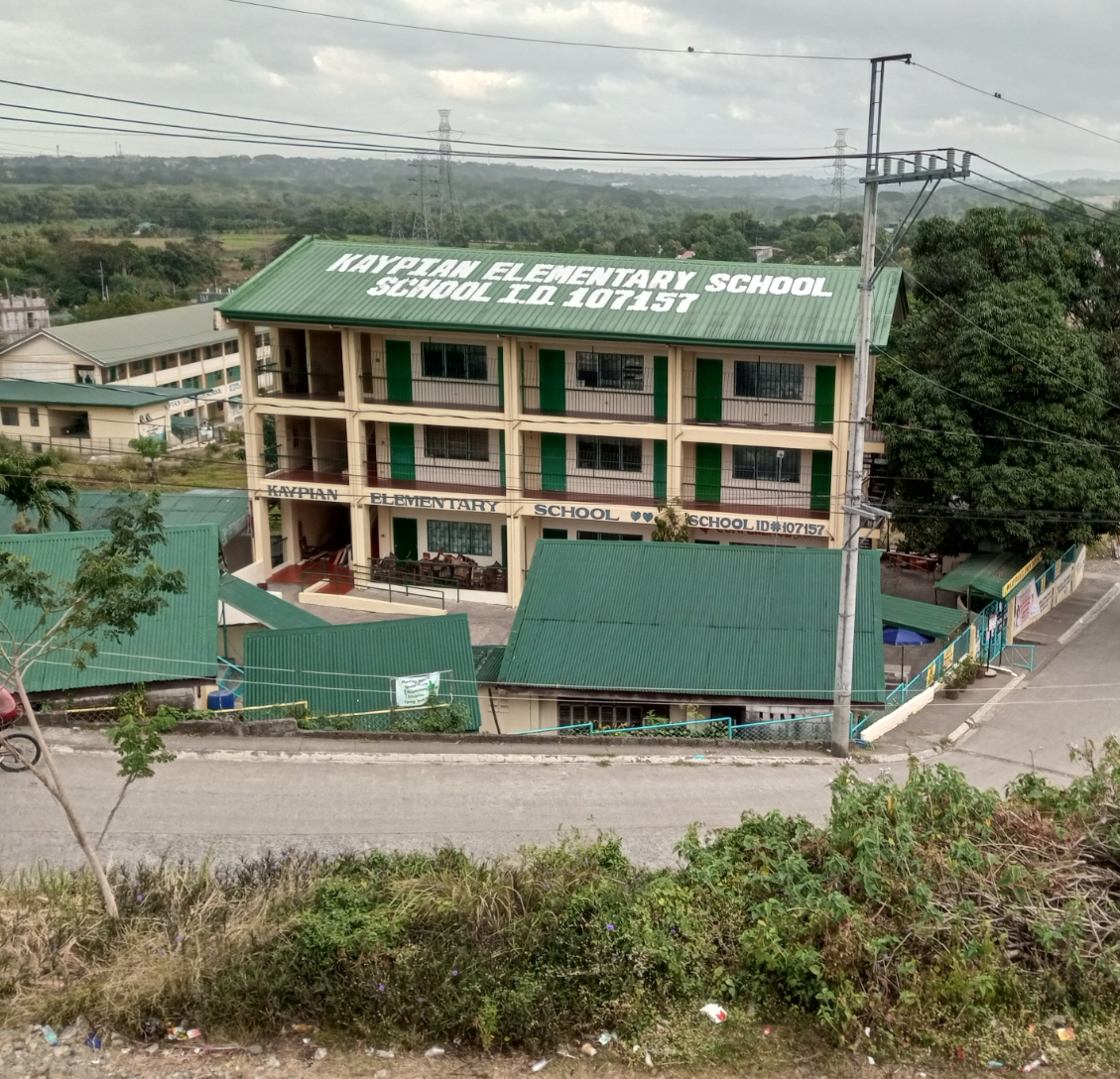
  Kaypian Elementary School in Barangay Kaypian, San Jose del Monte
- SJDM Cornerstone College, Inc.
- STI Academic Center San José del Monte
- Village Montessori School and Colleges
- Christian Ecclesiastical School

=== Public high schools ===
- Angelito M. Sarmiento High School
- Citrus National High School
- City of San José del Monte National Science High School
- Graceville National High School
- Kakawate National High School
- Kaypian National High School
- Marangal National High School
- Minuyan National High School
- Muzón Harmony Hills High School
- Paradise Farms National High School
- San José del Monte Heights High School
- San José del Monte National High School
- San José del Monte National Trade School
- San Manuel National High School
- San Martín National High School
- San Rafael National High School
- Santo Cristo National High School
- Sapang Palay National High School
- Towerville National High School

== Government ==
=== Local government ===
Current city hall in Dulong Bayan

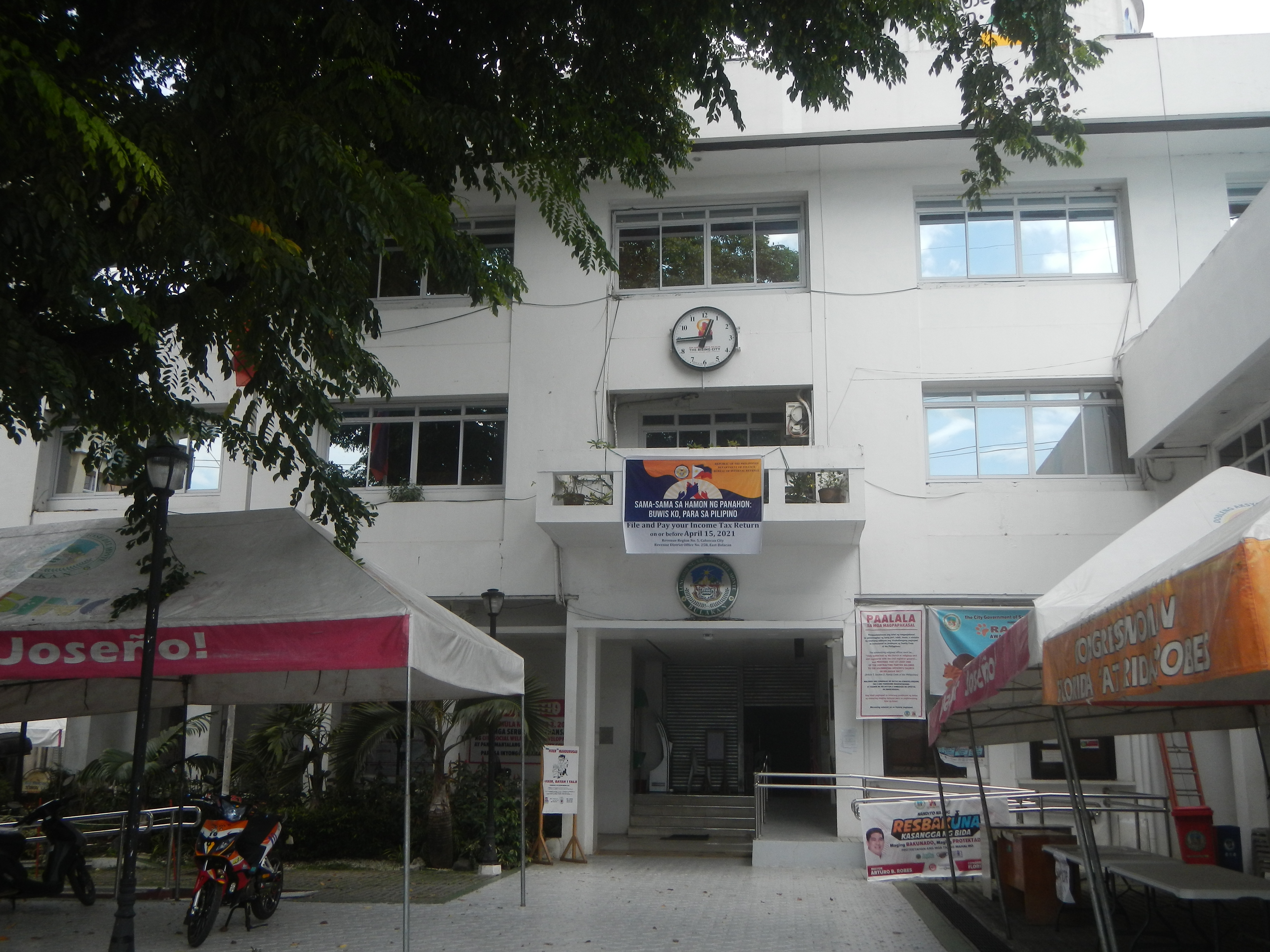
Old city hall in Poblacion 1

The city halls of San Jose del Monte

Like other cities in the Philippines, San Jose del Monte is governed by a mayor and vice mayor elected to three-year terms. The mayor is the executive head and leads the city's departments in executing the city ordinances and improving public services. The vice mayor heads a legislative council consisting of 12 members: 6 from District I and 6 from District II. The council is in charge of creating the city's policies.

=== Government officials (2025–28) ===
Elected local officials, such as the representative, mayor, vice mayor, and twelve councilors, are currently serving their terms that last from 2025 to 2028.

Position	Name	Party
Mayor	Florida L. Pérez-Robes	Partido Federal ng Pilipinas
Vice Mayor	Arlene C. Bartolomé-Arciaga	Arangkada San Joseño
Representative	Arturo B. Robes	Lakas-CMD
1st District
Councilors	Rosalyn C. Cabuco	Arangkada San Joseño
Councilors	Allan Ray A. Baluyut	National Unity Party
Councilors	Julieta D. Abela	Arangkada San Joseño
Councilors	Nolly D. Concepción	Arangkada San Joseño
Councilors	Oliver M. Robes	Arangkada San Joseño
Councilors	Victorino H. Gerona Jr.	Arangkada San Joseño
2nd District
Councilors	Reina Rhodora I. Capa	Arangkada San Joseño
Councilors	Ronalyn B. Pordan	Akbayan
Councilors	Criztopher B. Tiu	Arangkada San Joseño
Councilors	Vanessa Michelle S. Roquero	Arangkada San Joseño
Councilors	Celso G. Francisco	Arangkada San Joseño
Councilors	Benjamín G. Acibal Jr.	Arangkada San Joseño
Ex-Officio Members
ABC President	Zosimo Lorenzo (Barangay Kaypian)	
SK President	Zymond Kiel D. Ipio (Barangay Muzon East)	
Barangay Chairpersons
DISTRICT I
Población	Emilia M. Pasco	
Población 1	Laarnie M. Contreras	
Francisco Homes-Narra	Philip Oicenev G. Villar	
Francisco Homes-Mulawin	Herson Paul Hayo	
Francisco Homes-Yakal	Leonor Escuro	
Francisco Homes-Guijo	Celso Apatan	
Gumaoc East	Rommel B. Pitalbo	
Gumaoc West	Manolito B. Blen	
Gumaoc Central	Manuel M. Gabion	
Graceville	Melencio I. Garcia	
Gaya-Gaya	Enry L. Santos	
Santo Cristo	Eufronio B. Avena	
Tungkong Mangga	Alexander dS. Medina	
Dulong Bayan	Gerardo A. Aguirre	
Ciudad Real	Benjamín de León	
Maharlika	Andro Batingan	
San Manuel	Gilbert Baptista	
Kaypian	Zosimo Lorenzo	
San Isidro	Mario N. Balmaceda	
San Roque	Matias Walinsundin	
Kaybanban	Eriberto Belisano, Jr.	
Paradise III	Gloria Cardona	
Muzon Proper	Elizabeth dC. Valerio	
Muzon East	Elena Joy B. Celis	
Muzon West	Paolo Martin P. Mateo	
Muzon South	Edgar E. Celis	
DISTRICT II
Minuyan Proper	Irene A. Biteng	
Minuyan I	Alberto P. Lachica	
Minuyan II	Vilma F. Barrientos	
Minuyan III	Kristian Ed M. Espinosa	
Minuyan IV	Antonio Madrilejos	
Minuyan V	Roberto Q. Arguilles	
Bagong Buhay I	Rogelio Elfa	
Bagong Buhay II	Emma DV. De Leon	
Bagong Buhay III	Angelina Batiguas	
San Martín I	Arlando A. Disamburun	
San Martín II	Alma P. Palacay	
San Martín III	Remedios A. Joseph	
San Martín IV	Christian P. Tamayo	
Santa Cruz I	Ruben J. Gammad	
Santa Cruz II	Reynaldo G. Budac	
Santa Cruz III	Genelyn C. Piano	
Santa Cruz IV	Raymundo Arriesgado	
Santa Cruz V	Marcelino H. Abing	
Fatima I	George Tablan Jr.	
Fatima II	Pedro Padilla Jr.	
Fatima III	Roberto R. Managabat	
Fatima IV	Ronnie Tabuzo	
Fatima V	Ronalyn B. Pordan	
Citrus	Larry Demo	
San Pedro	Criztopher Tiu	
Sapang Palay Proper	Paulo A. Sta. Maria	
San Martín de Porres	Myrna M. Manzano	
Assumption	Bienvenido Punzal	
Santo Niño I	Ricardo Semilla, Jr.	
Santo Niño II	Reynaldo C. Francisco	
Lawang Pare	Hilario D. Dabu	
San Rafael I	Edmon P. Daluz	
San Rafael II	Sonny Canonce	
San Rafael III	Zenaida S. Dela Cruz	
San Rafael IV	Victorel C. Roxas	
San Rafael V	Ma. Flor Cerera	
Sangguniang Kabataan Barangay Chairpersons
DISTRICT I
Población	Mico B. Andes	
Población 1	Lee Martin P. Mendoza	
Francisco Homes-Narra	Harvey Salboro	
Francisco Homes-Mulawin	Annie Rita G. Cabrera	
Francisco Homes-Yakal	Kurt Louie Q. Alison	
Francisco Homes-Guijo	Mherinolle S. Obias	
Gumaok East	Daniel C. Costales	
Gumaok West	Angelo DC. Bonifacio	
Gumaok Central	Louise Venus Danell S. Trajia	
Graceville	Gianelle P. Flores	
Gaya-Gaya	Mark Angelo G. Aguirre	
Santo Cristo	Jennica R. Francisco	
Tungkong Mangga	Mary Ann C. Dungan	
Dulong Bayan	Jhervee H. German	
Ciudad Real	Kristine Emerald S. Oliva	
Maharlika	Maria Cassandrah J. Malapit	
San Manuel	Emmanuel Kenneth R. Bernas	
Kaypian	Precious Izza C. de Vera	
San Isidro	Marlou F. Aljecera	
San Roque	Leony B. Marquez	
Kaybanban	Micaela F. Tan	
Paradise III	Tristan James Toledo	
Muzon Proper	Aleana Marie F. Concepción	
Muzon East	Zymond Kiel DV. Ipio	
Muzon West	John Clarenz C. Valerio	
Muzon South	Katrina dC. Cortez	
DISTRICT II
Minuyan Proper	Kyla Martin O. Bacaron	
Minuyan I	Lheslyn Mae I. Bermejo	
Minuyan II	John Dave E. Hizole	
Minuyan III	Alyssa D. Remolador	
Minuyan IV	Armando Y. Victoriano	
Minuyan V	Grazellyn V. Silvestre	
Bagong Buhay I	Angelie Argota	
Bagong Buhay II	Shennecka Sheill de la Vega	
Bagong Buhay III	Andrew T. Esquivel	
San Martín I	Brian P. Pelegrino	
San Martín II	Janine Kyla C. Nevado	
San Martín III	Ana Julianna P. Baylon	
San Martín IV	Girlhea Mae M. Hayagan	
Santa Cruz I	Kailah Rose L. Silverio	
Santa Cruz II	Samuel C. Suello	
Santa Cruz III	Michaela G. Evangelio	
Santa Cruz IV	Mark Jone A. Andoy	
Santa Cruz V	Roselle DP. Constantino	
Fátima I	Charles Andrei S. Castro	
Fátima II	John Harold P. Manzanero	
Fátima III	Katrina C. Cendaña	
Fátima IV	Carizza L. Bonghanoy	
Fátima V	Christian Kyle N. Pallares	
Citrus	Cris Beth T. Badeo	
San Pedro	Soah Paula A. Uy	
Sapang Palay Proper	Jan Chezter H. Cataniag	
San Martín de Porres	Sofia Almira D. Sansano	
Assumption	Honeylyn G. Besáñez	
Santo Niño I	Jervy S. Sierte	
Santo Niño II	Louwell B. Rabacio	
Lawang Pare	Maja Jhamie C. Santos	
San Rafael I	Janisse T. Turla	
San Rafael II	Mc John Gerryll E. Zamora	
San Rafael III	Rachelle Mae B. Nagales	
San Rafael IV	Julius I. Salva	
San Rafael V	Angelo L. Pangilinan	

=== Congress representation ===
The city has a lone legislative district, being represented in the country's House of Representatives.

== Gallery ==
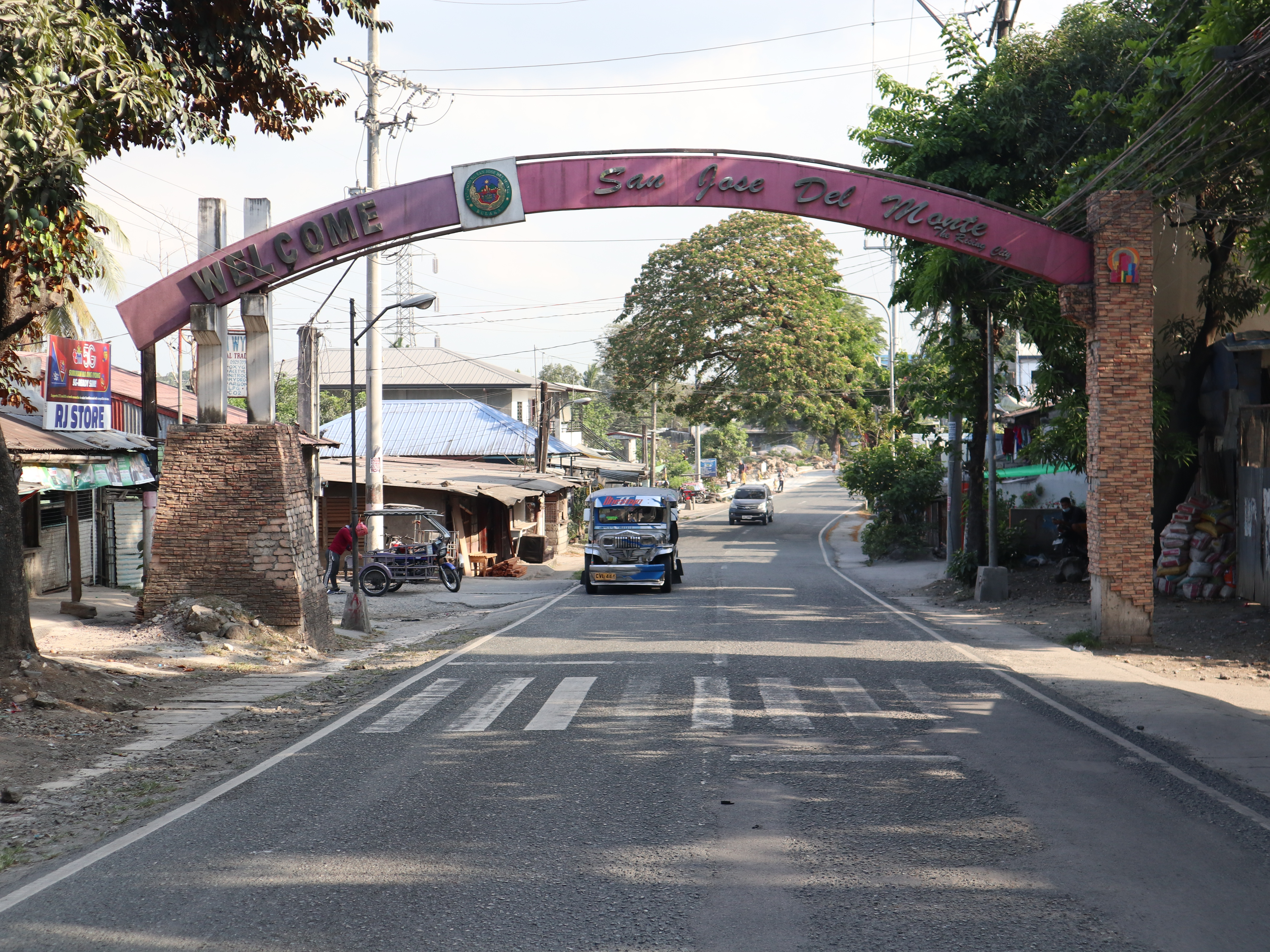
Welcome arch

Convention Center

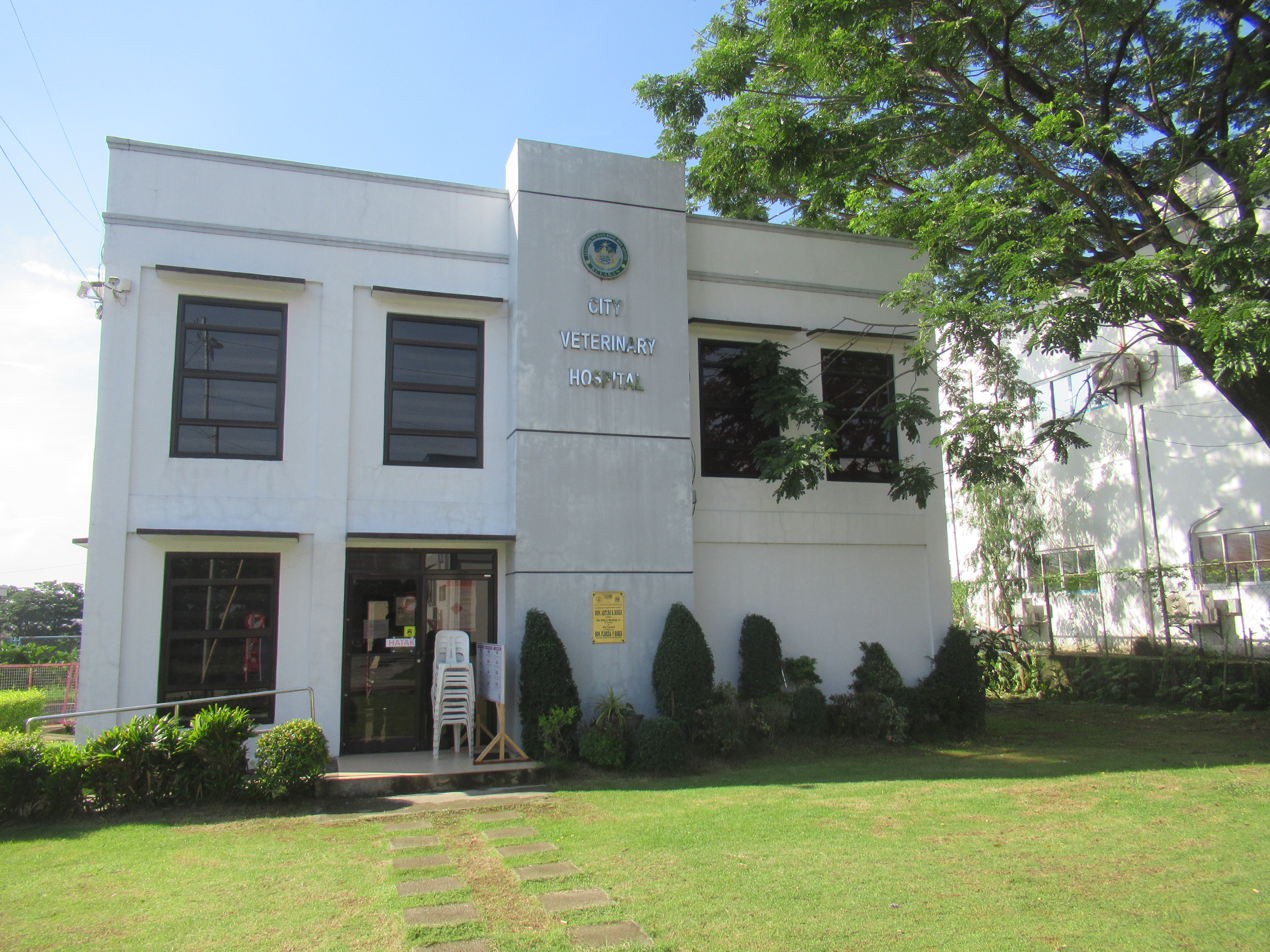
Veterinary Hospital

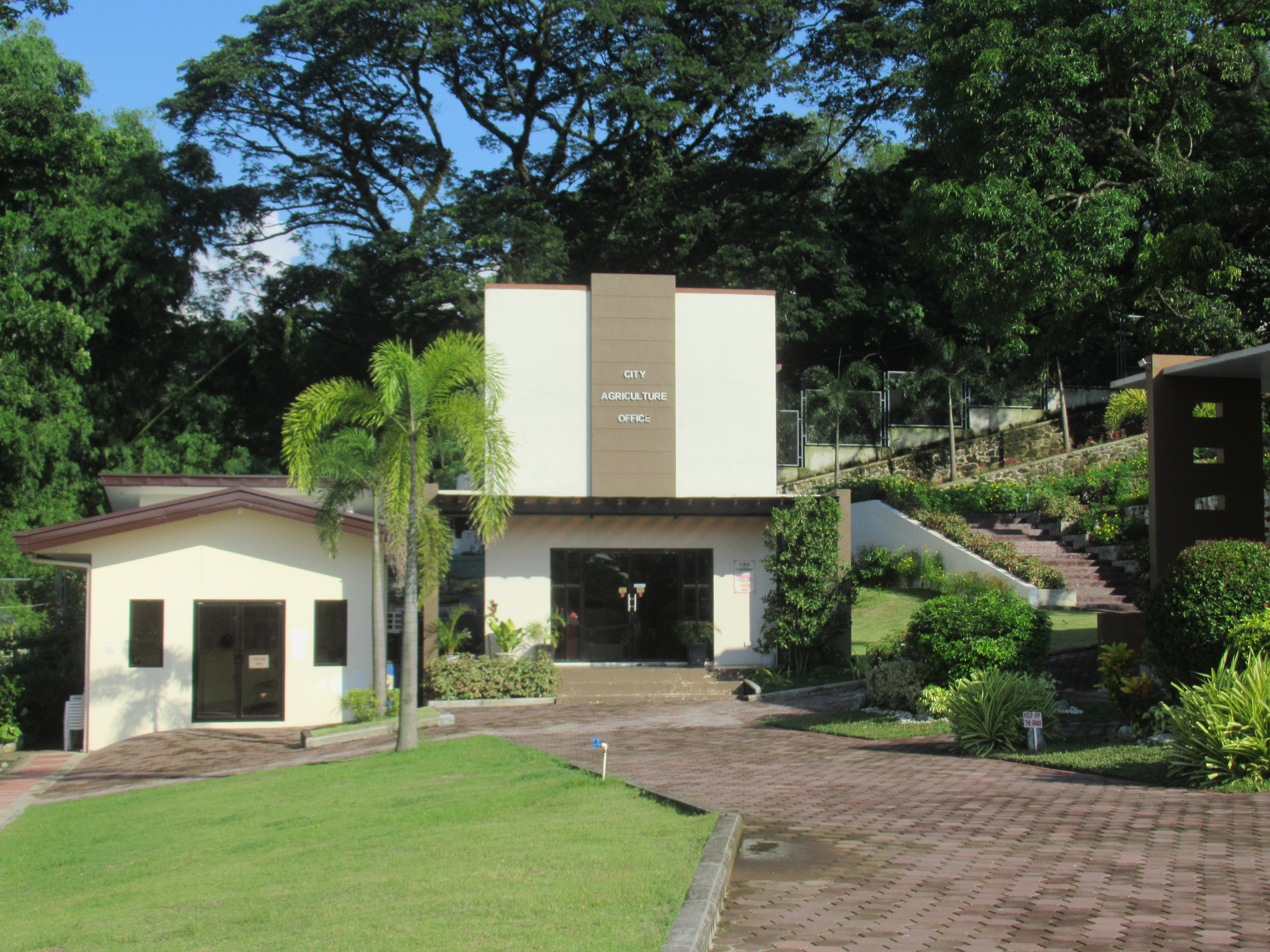
City Agriculture Office

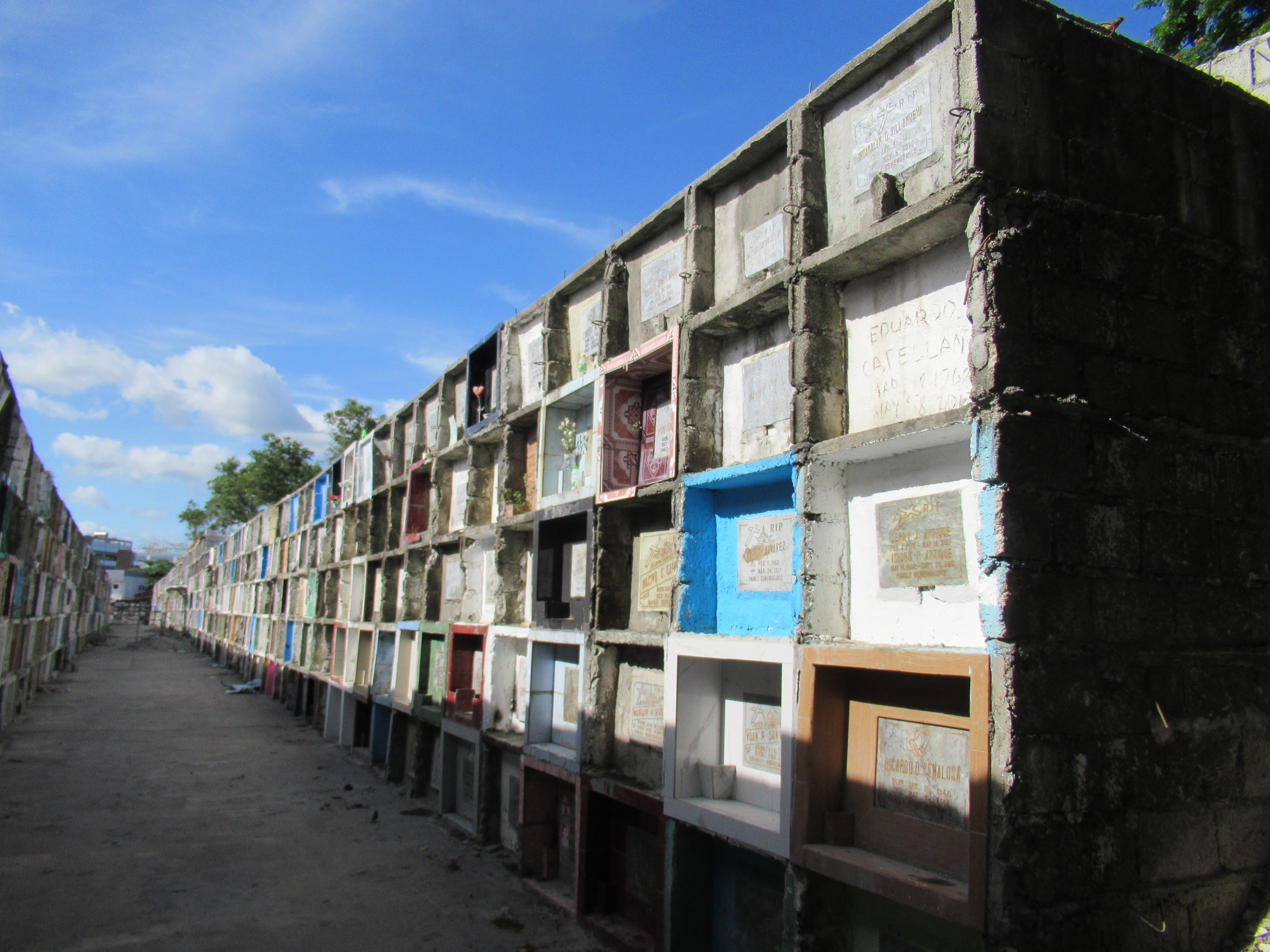
San Jose del Monte Public Cemetery

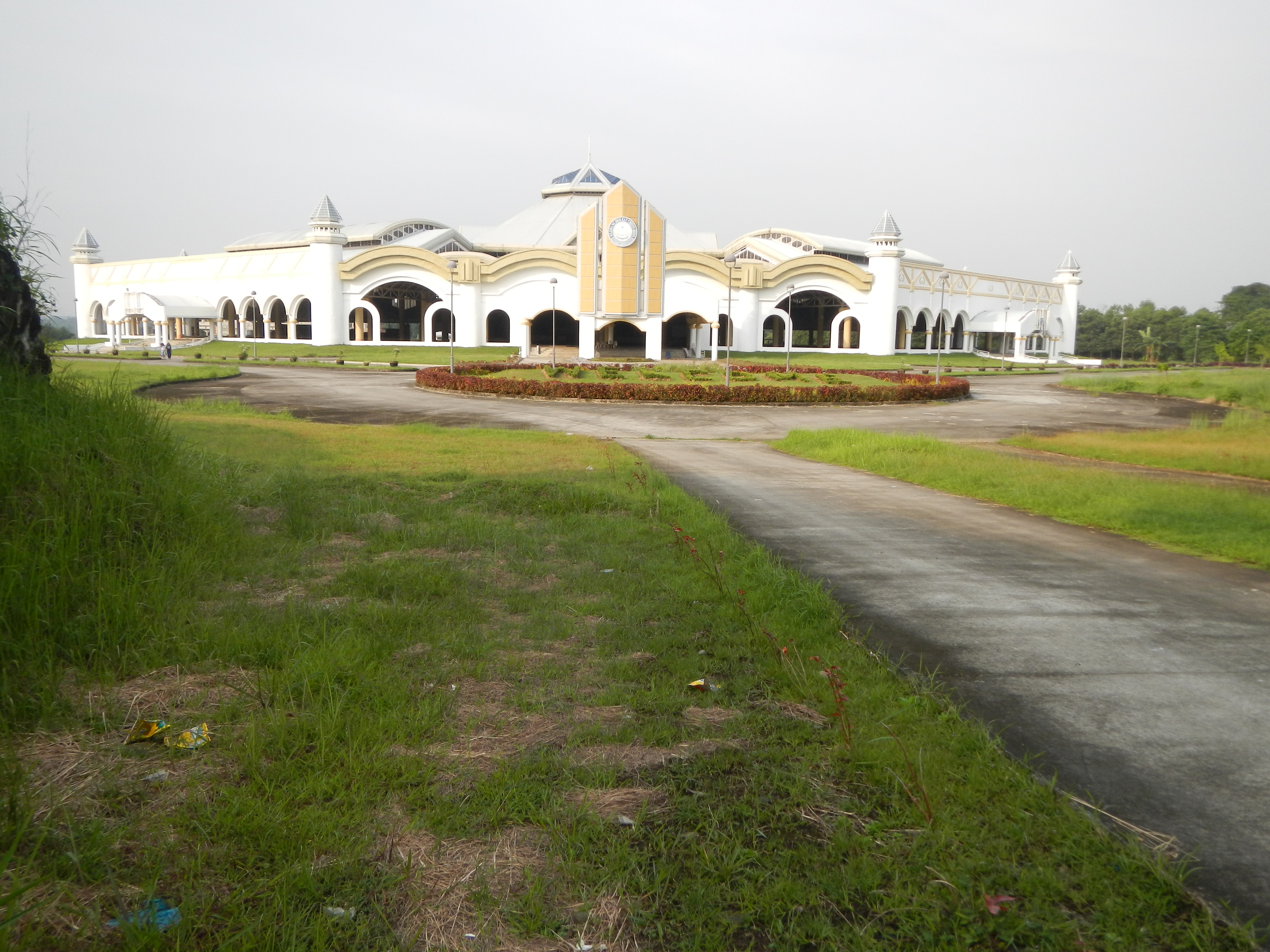
Iglesia ng Dios na Buhay kay Cristo Jesus church

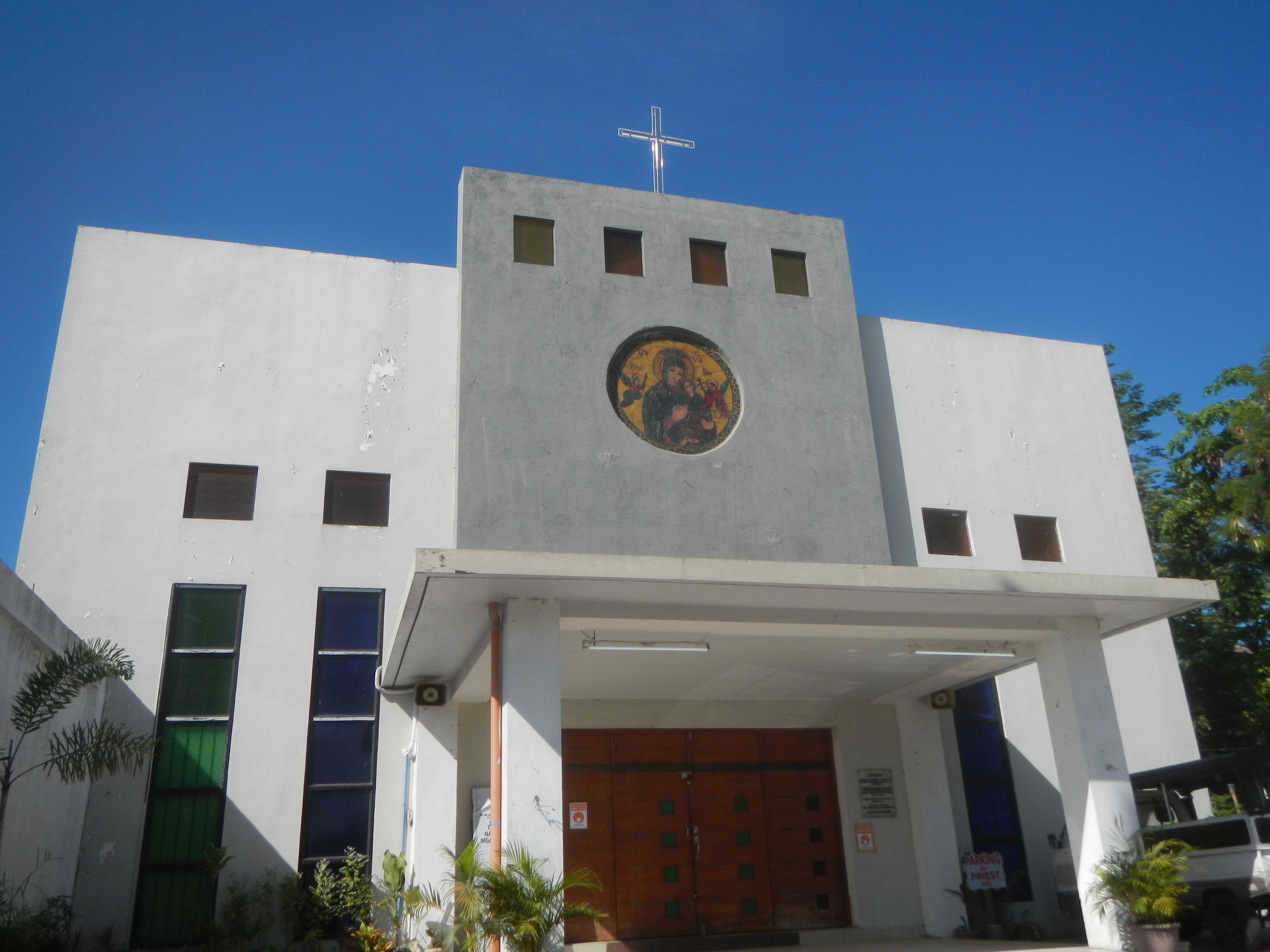
Mother of Perpetual Help Quasi-Parish in Gaya-gaya

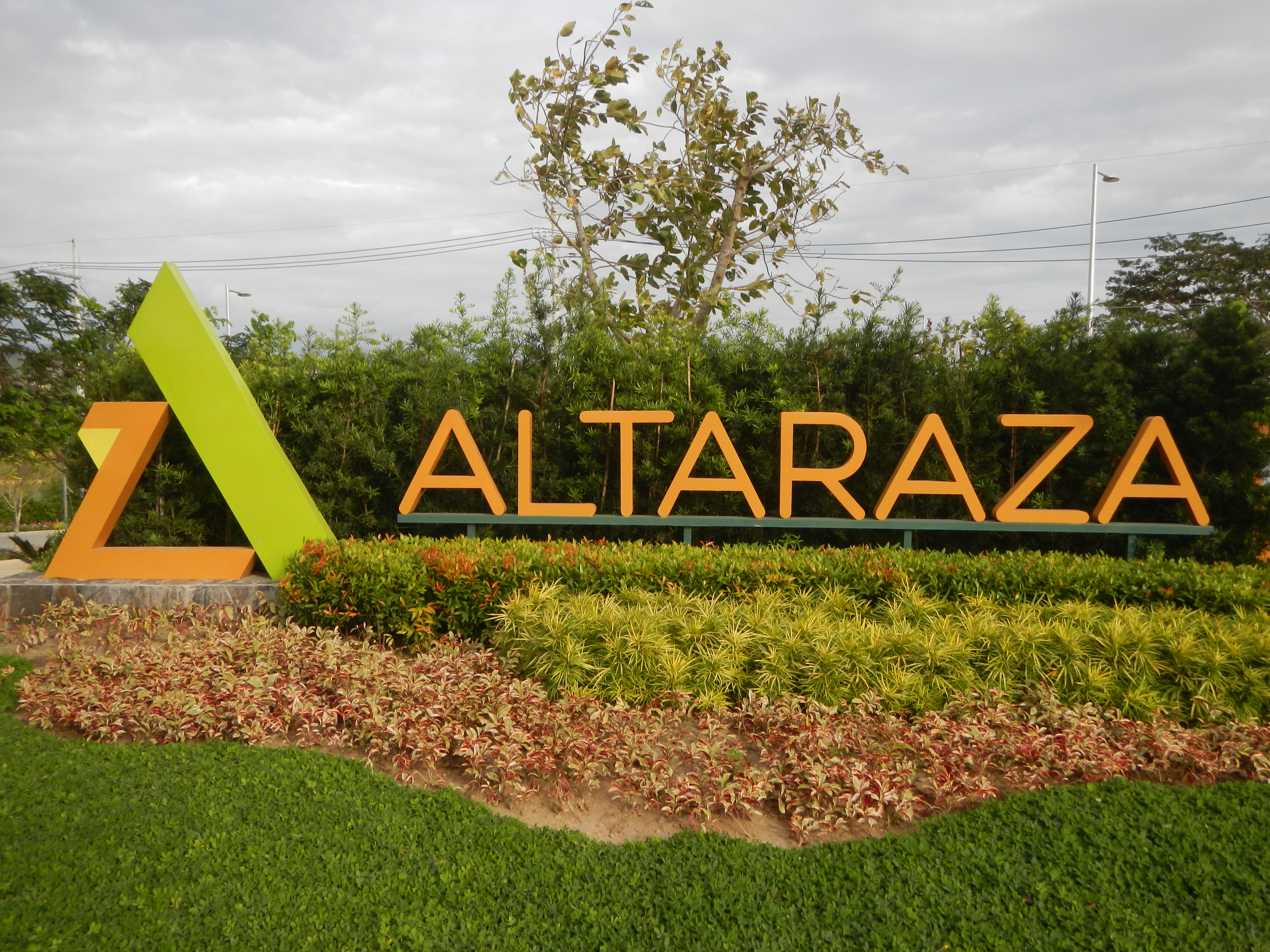
Altaraza

SM City San Jose Del Monte

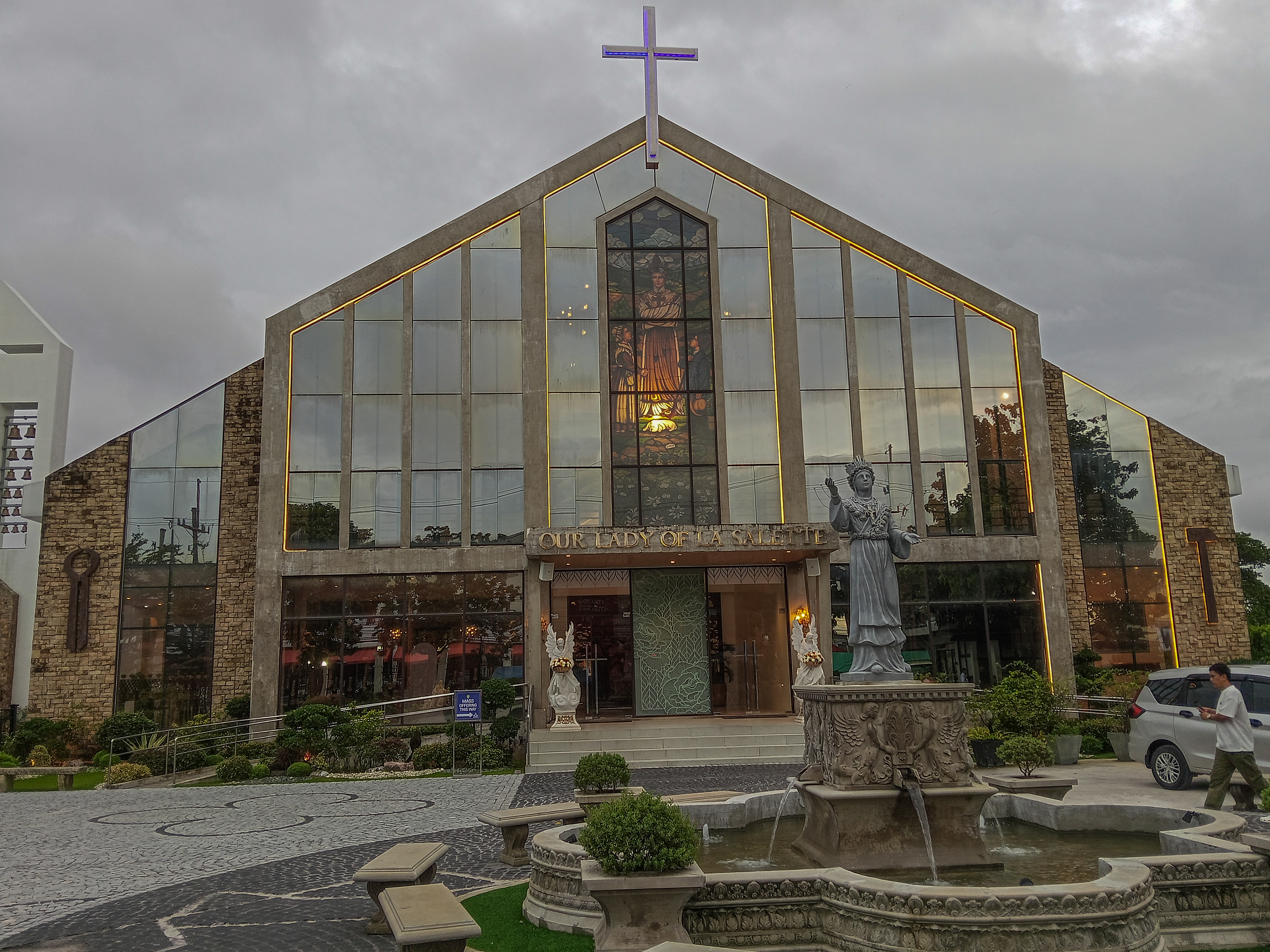
Our Lady of La Salette Quasi-Parish

== Notable personalities ==
=== Politics ===
- Angelito Sarmiento, politician, former mayor and representative for Bulacan's 4th district
- Arthur Robes, politician, former mayor and incumbent representative for the city's lone district
- Florida Robes, politician, former representative for the city's lone district and incumbent mayor
- Crispin Beltran, activist, politician, and former representative for Bayan Muna partylist
- Eduardo Roquero, politician, former mayor and representative for the city's lone district

=== Sports ===
- Angeli Tabaquero, volleyball player

=== Music, Film, and Television ===
- Chesster Chay, television personality
- Imelda Papin, singer
