= San Jose del Monte National Trade School =

Public high school in Bulacan, Philippines

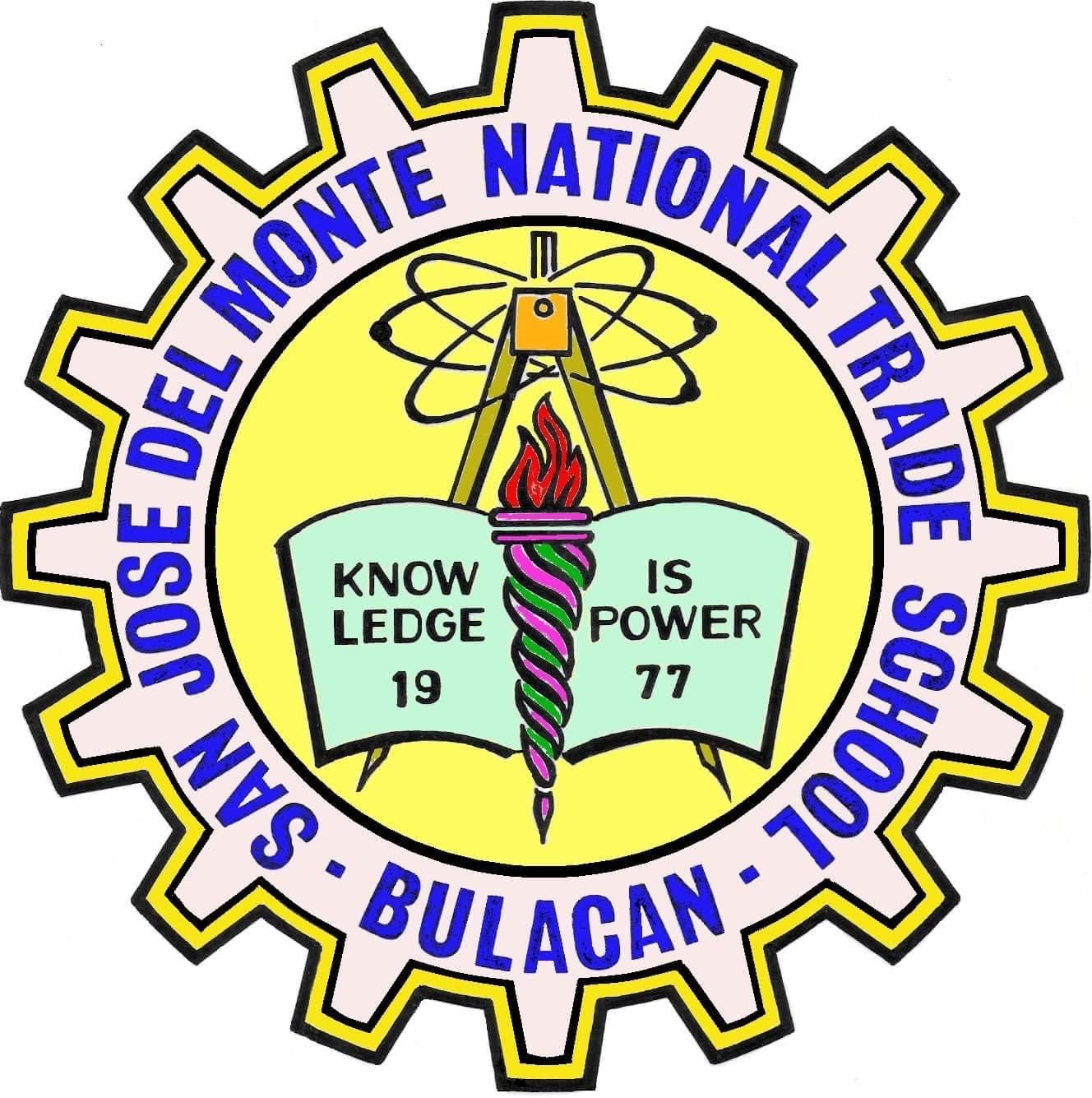

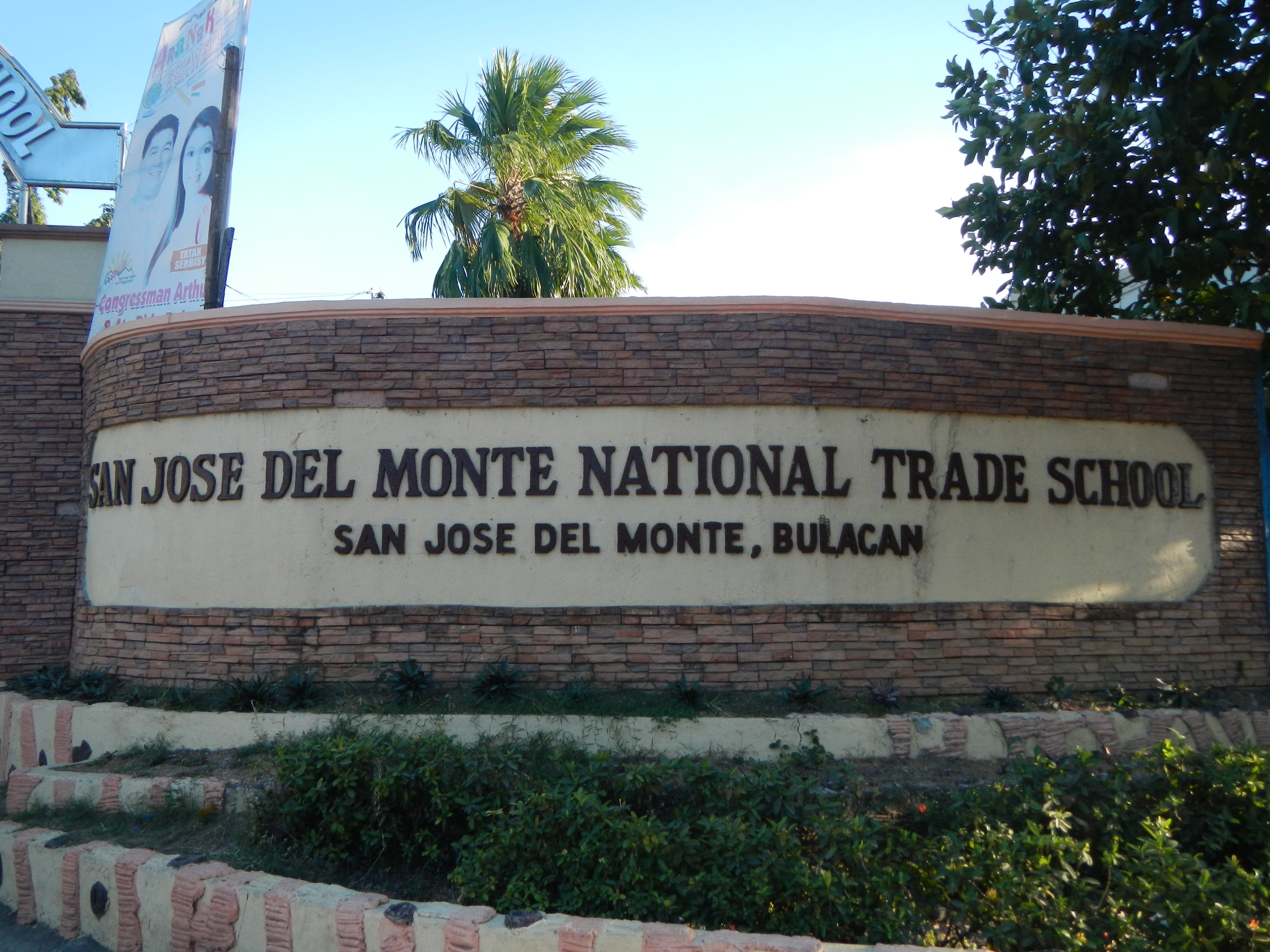

Location
- Barangay Fatima V, Area E San Jose del Monte City, Philippines, Bulacan 3023; Philippines
- Coordinates: 14°50′53″N 121°3′1″E

Information
- School type: Vocational School
- Established: 1977
- School number: 301061
- Principal: Annie C. Joaquin; Principal IV
- Academic Heads: Peachy Fernandez, Head Teacher III; Ricardo Guanzon, Head Teacher IV, STVE
- Song: "SJDMNTS Hymn"
- Newspaper: Lunduyan and The Settlers

San Jose del Monte National Trade School (SJDMNTS) is a public secondary and the only technical vocational school in the city of San Jose del Monte, Bulacan, Philippines. Located at Barangay Fatima V, Area E, It was established by virtue of Republic Act. 5666.
