= Jesus the Greatest Name Christian College =

Christian school in Bulacan, Philippines

Information
- Established: 2003; 23 years ago
- Enrollment: 285

Jesus the Greatest Name Christian College (JGNCC) is an educational institution in San Jose del Monte, Bulacan in the Philippines. Established in 2003 by Mr. and Mrs. Pedro Maguad, the school population (comprising Pre-elementary, Elementary, and High School pupils and students) has grown to its present size of 285.

True to its identity as a Christian school, it also serves as the Pleasant Hills Cell Church of Jesus Christ the Savior International Assemblies (JCSIA).

== Scholarships ==
JGNCC has been awarded 46 Educational Service Contracting (ESC) scholarships by the Fund for Assistance to Private Education in July 2008. The program grants five thousand-peso tuition and school fees subsidy to graduates from public elementary schools. Grantees enjoy the scholarship for their entire stay in high school provided that they do not incur failing marks and/or disciplinary violations.
