= 2016 Meycauayan local elections =

Meycauayan city election results

2016 Meycauayan City local elections
- May 9, 2016
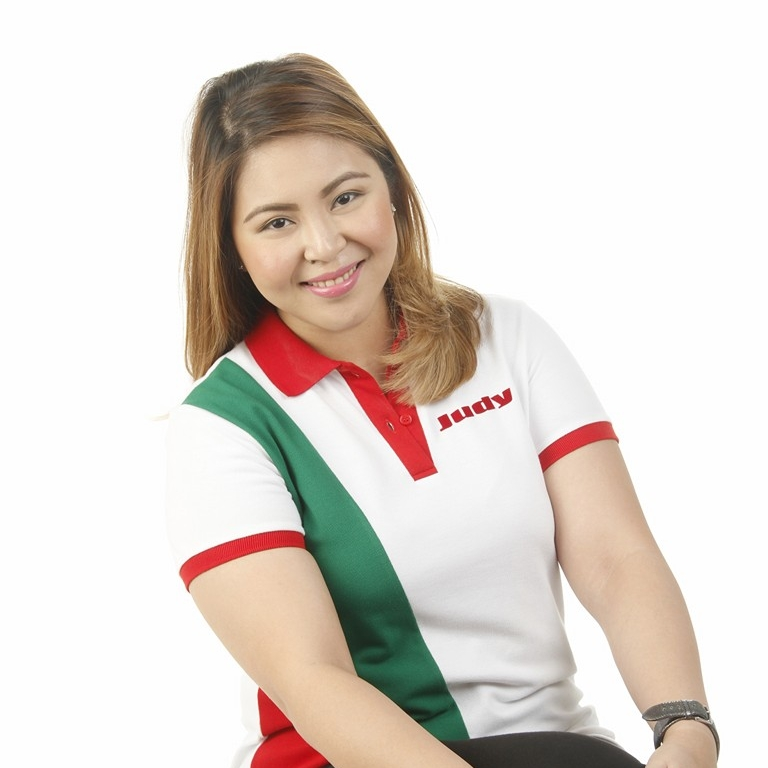
| Nominee | Henry Villarica | Judy Alarilla | Pabling Milan |
| Party | Liberal | NPC | Independent |
| Running mate | Jojo Manzano | Barbell Aguirre | N/A |
| Popular vote | 67,588 | 23,923 | 503 |
| Percentage | 73.5% | 26.0% | 0.5% |
Mayor before election
Joan Alarilla
NPC
Elected mayor
Henry Villarica
Liberal

Local elections were held in Meycauayan City, Bulacan on May 9, 2016, within the Philippine general election. The voters will elect for the elective local posts in the city: the mayor, vice mayor, and ten councilors.

== Mayoral and vice mayoral election ==
Due to term limitation, Incumbent City Mayor Joan Alarilla is taking her luck to be the next House Representative of 4th District of Bulacan. She will facing the incumbent 4th District House Representative Linabelle Villarica.

While in Meycauayan City, the daughter of Joan Alarilla, Judy Alarilla is running for City mayor under the Nationalist Peoples Coalition and her opponent, the Husband of House Representative Linabelle Villarica, Attorney Henry Villarica whose running for Liberal Party. The other candidate is Pabling Milan, an independent candidate.

== Results ==
The candidates for mayor and vice mayor with the highest number of votes wins the seat; they are voted separately, therefore, they may be of different parties when elected.

=== Mayoral & Vice Mayoral Candidates ===
List of Candidates as of March 2016

Meycauayan City Mayoralty election
| Party | Candidate | Votes | % |
|---|---|---|---|
| Liberal | Henry Villarica | 67,588 | 73.5% |
| NPC | Judy Alarilla | 23,923 | 26.0% |
| Independent | Pabling Milan | 503 | 0.5% |
| Total votes | | 92,014 | 100% |

Meycauayan City Vice Mayoralty election
| Party | Candidate | Votes | % |
|---|---|---|---|
| Liberal | Jojo Manzano | 61,385 | 70.5% |
| NPC | Mario Aguirre | 25,649 | 29.5% |
| Total votes | | 87,034 | 100% |

=== City Council election ===
Election is via plurality-at-large voting: A voter votes for up to ten candidates, then the ten candidates with the highest number of votes are elected.

Nationalist People's Coalition/
| Name | Party |
|---|---|
| | NPC |
| | NPC |
| | NPC |
| | NPC |
| | NPC |
| | NPC |
| | NPC |
| | NPC |
| | NPC |
| | NPC |

==== Team Villarica ====
Liberal Party/Team Villarica
| Name | Party |
|---|---|
| Cathy Abacan | Liberal |
| Raoul Atadero | Liberal |
| Totoy Certeza | Liberal |
| Cocoy Dulalia | Liberal |
| Kat Hernandez | Liberal |
| Elmer Paguio | Liberal |
| Mekok Ramirez | Liberal |
| Tom Rosales | Liberal |
| Bunny Velasco | Liberal |
| Jojie Violago | Liberal |

Meycauayan City Council election
| Party | Candidate | Votes | % |
|---|---|---|---|
| Liberal | Jojie Violago | 56,493 | |
| Liberal | Raoul Atadero | 54,594 | |
| Liberal | Elmer Paguio | 53,702 | |
| Liberal | Cathy Abacan | 50,854 | |
| Liberal | Cocoy Dulalia | 50,772 | |
| Liberal | Kat Hernandez | 48,498 | |
| Liberal | Mekok Ramirez | 44,120 | |
| Liberal | Bunny Velasco | 37,414 | |
| Liberal | Tom Rosales | 36,310 | |
| NPC | Mario Berboso | 35,524 | |
| Liberal | Danilo Certeza | 35,044 | |
| NPC | Celing Lunaria | 32,832 | |
| NPC | Tikboy San Pablo | 30,196 | |
| NPC | Phoebe Kate Lacsamana | 27,464 | |
| NPC | Paolo Lopez | 23,642 | |
| NPC | Cesar Banigued | 16,914 | |
| NPC | Dennis Bautista | 15,886 | |
| NPC | Boy Magkasi | 15,594 | |
| Independent | Bunso Lunaria | 12,334 | |
| NPC | Rolly Bulan | 11,350 | |
| NPC | Allan Mañez | 10,789 | |
| Independent | Bobby Palomares | 7,209 | |
| Independent | Leng Reyes | 4,620 | |
| Independent | Greg San Juan | 4,183 | |
| Independent | Matias Galimba Jr. | 2,200 | |
| Total votes | | | 100.00 |
