= 2010 Meycauayan local elections =

2010 Meycauayan mayoral elections
- May 10, 2010
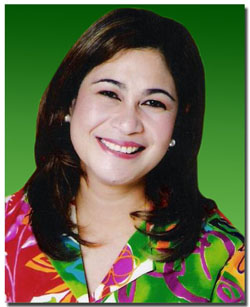

Nominee	Joan Alarilla	Salvador "Bogs" Violago Sr.	Adriano "Dan" Daez
Party	NPC	Nacionalista	Liberal
Running mate	Rafael Manzano Jr.	Tomas Rosales	Manuel Dennis Carlos
Popular vote	43,661	33,168	3,784
Percentage	54.05%	41.06%	4.68%
Mayor before election
Joan Alarilla
NPC
Elected mayor
Joan Alarilla
NPC

Local elections was held in Meycauayan City, Bulacan on May 10, 2010 within the Philippine general election. The voters will elect for the elective local posts in the city: the mayor, vice mayor, and ten councilors.

== Mayoral and vice mayoral election ==
Incumbent Mayor Joan Alarilla is running for second term, along with her running mate Rafael Manzano Jr. She faced Salvador Violago Sr. and former mayor Adriano Daez.

== Results ==
The candidates for mayor and vice mayor with the highest number of votes wins the seat; they are voted separately, therefore, they may be of different parties when elected.

=== Mayoral & Vice Mayoral Candidates ===
List of Candidates as of March 2010

Meycauayan City Mayoral Election
Party	Candidate	Votes	%
NPC	Joan Alarilla	43,661	54.05
Nacionalista	Salvador "Bogs" Violago Sr.	33,168	41.06
Liberal	Adriano "Dan" Daez	3,784	4.68
Independent	Rosita "Rosy" Perez	165	0.20
Total votes		80,778	100.00
NPC hold			

Notes:

- The Liberal Party are in coalition with the party Aksyon Demokratiko of Sonia Roco.

Meycauayan City Vice Mayoral Election
Party	Candidate	Votes	%
NPC	Rafael Manzano Jr.	34,805	45.12
Liberal	Manuel Dennis Carlos	24,433	31.68
Nacionalista	Tomas Rosales	12,627	16.37
Independent	Mauro Del Rosario	4,755	6.16
Independent	Pablo Milan	514	0.67
Total votes		77,134	100.00
NPC hold			

Notes:

- The Liberal Party are in coalition with the party Aksyon Demokratiko of Sonia Roco.

=== City Council election ===
Election is via plurality-at-large voting: A voter votes for up to ten candidates, then the ten candidates with the highest number of votes are elected.

Party	Votes	%	Seats
Nationalist People's Coalition	286,163	43.45	7
Nacionalista Party	220,140	33.42	3
Liberal Party	144,679	21.97	0
Independent	7,657	1.16	0
Ex officio seats			2
Total	658,639	100.00	12
Total votes	83,379	–	

Meycauayan City council election
Party	Candidate	Votes	%
NPC	Raoul Atadero	39,748	47.67
NPC	Danilo Abacan Sr.	37,217	44.64
NPC	Susan Dulalia	36,578	43.87
Nacionalista	Elmer Paguio	36,240	43.46
NPC	Mario Aguirre	32,086	38.48
NPC	Carlo Villarico	31,724	38.05
NPC	Celing Lunaria	26,546	31.84
Nacionalista	Cesardo Banigued	25,818	30.96
NPC	Agustin Alarilla	24,779	29.72
Nacionalista	Rolando Abacan	23,582	28.28
NPC	Rene Ponciano	20,873	25.03
Nacionalista	Celso Legaspi Jr.	20,350	24.41
Nacionalista	Eladio Seminiano	19,913	23.88
Nacionalista	Manuel Aldaba	19,608	23.52
Nacionalista	Lourdes Avendaño	19,419	23.29
Nacionalista	Albert Joseph Cruz	18,882	22.65
Nacionalista	Reynaldo Ang	18,746	22.48
NPC	Abelardo Aban	18,628	22.34
NPC	Alexander Ramos	17,984	21.57
Nacionalista	Lilibeth Pila	17,582	21.09
Liberal	Ramon Tobias	8,497	10.19
Liberal	Ernesto Go	7,944	9.53
Liberal	Francisco Camilon Jr.	7,864	9.43
Liberal	Placida Delos Reyes	7,466	8.95
Liberal	Gaudencio Jimenez Jr.	5,271	6.32
Independent	Joseph Burgos	4,991	5.99
Liberal	Danilo Calderon	4,863	5.83
Liberal	Pio Francisco	4,416	5.30
Liberal	Ernesto Oliva	4,207	5.05
Liberal	Perpetua Marita Bayer	4,121	4.94
Liberal	Lorenzo Galera	3,405	4.08
Independent	Estelita Macarasig	2,666	3.20
Total votes			

Notes:

- The Liberal Party are in coalition with the party Aksyon Demokratiko of Sonia Roco.
