= Antonio Z. Atienza Jr. =

Filipino silversmith

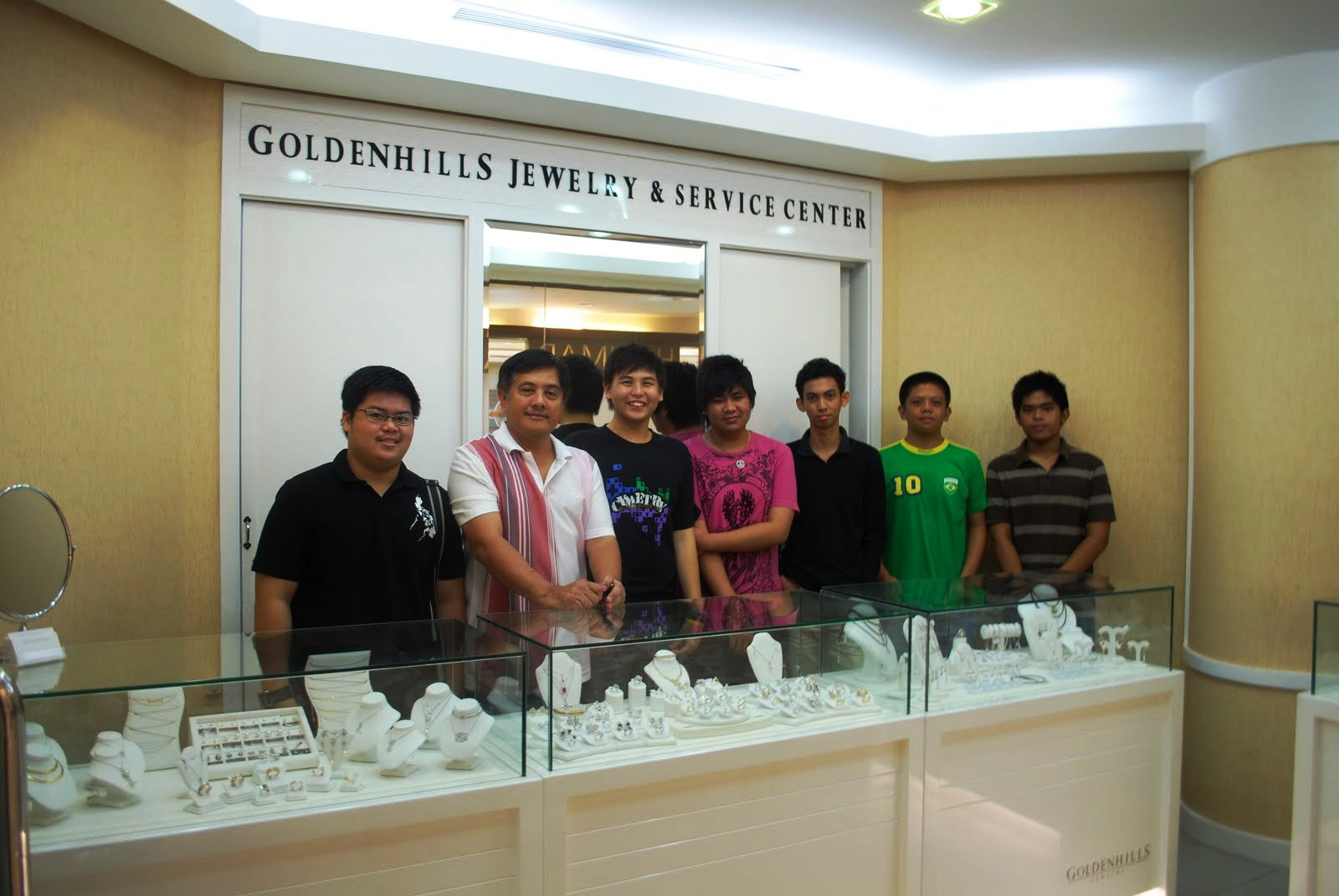
Antonio Z. Atienza Jr., Filipino jeweler.

Antonio Z. Atienza Jr. (born August 30, 1959) is a Filipino jeweler. As a manufacturer, exporter, and retailer of fine jewelry products, he is the owner of Goldenas Jewelry, Inc. He is a member of the Guild of Philippine Jewelers, Inc. The Guild's mission as a national organization is to promote the transformation and growth of the Philippine jewelry industry.

== Early life and education ==
In 1973, Atienza, a Meycauayan College student and resident of Barangay Zamora, Meycauayan, was trained in business by his father Antonio, a pawnshop partner. Atienza earned his Bachelor of Science general studies at the University of Santo Tomas. In 1976, he worked with his uncle's shop, due to the insolvency of his parents’ business.

== Career ==
A horseshoe ring which he sold for P15,000 signaled the start of his jewelry business. Atienza, Jr.'s Goldenas metamorphosed from Boy Atienza Jewel Art, a jewelry contracting shop, which started in 1982 with only three goldsmiths, and one polisher. In 2003, it was incorporated as Goldenas, Inc. with the slogan “Proudly Philippine Made.” Atienza, Jr.'s Goldenhills Jewelry showcases wedding bands, engagement rings and other bride and her entourage jewelry. It opened its first store on June 30, 2004, at the 2nd Floor of The Jewellery, Greenhills Shopping Center, and at present, has a total of 6 branches. Atienza, Jr., as premiere designer, is a creator of one-of-a-kind adornment like his “Secret Promise” wedding ring. It is white gold with two-tone wedding band embedded with 56 diamonds (one carat and 26 points). His unique “Heritage Collection” is handmade using gold and precious gems. It is an anthology of lightweight jewelry with fusion of antique-moderne designs and injection of a theme inspired by spirals, flowers, leaves, and waves.

== Awards ==
In November 2005, Goldenas garnered two awards during the Fifth Philippine Fine Jewelry Design Competition at the Metro Comedy Bar in Quezon City. The design competition is an annual event organized by the Meycauayan Jewelry Industry Association, Inc. (MJIAI) in partnership with the Product Development and Design Center of the Philippines (Design Center).

"Eternal Love" was the top placer for the Wedding Category. Marie Liza DJ Cayana, the designer, works for Goldenas Jewelry, sponsor of the prototype. Christina Maris J. Juan of the University of Santo Tomas submitted the winning design for the Chic category with her "Down to Earth" entry. The necklace, according to Christina, is something you can take from work to play. Goldenas Jewelry also created the prototype. Goldenas, as a Philexport member, joined the Buy Pinoy goes to San Francisco from November 15 to 20, 2005 at the Philippine Center, 447 Sutter St.

In 2012, Antonio Z. Atienza Jr. (1979 Accounting) was named one of the Outstanding Alumni - Diamond Awardees of the University of Santo Tomas College of Commerce and Business Administration.

== Kidnap for ransom ==
On March 24, 1997, Atienza Jr. was abducted by five armed men at Dona Mercedes subdivision, Libis, Iba, Meycauayan, Bulacan. After a series of negotiations between the armed men and his wife Consolacion A. Atienza, his mother Virginia Atienza and brother Alfredo Atienza, he was released in Pasig, Metro Manila on March 27, 1997, upon payment of P 2.2 million ransom and P 1.5 million after several days. Atienza Jr. sought the assistance of police operatives (who created a special task force under Joseph Cabato, Military Intelligence Group, under PTFIC). CIG Chief superintendent Efren Fernandez arrested 2 suspects (at a Meycauayan gas station): Felipe Montaos and Eduardo Soriano who pointed to Gerardo Roperez alias Boy Sabater, as mastermind. The other 3 suspects were later caught: Armando Pablo Mando, Rudy Depas Rudy Bigote, and Pablo Anora. In July 1997 and March 2001, Criminal cases were filed with the Office of the Provincial Prosecutor of Bulacan, and the case was docketed as "People versus Armando Pablo, Rudy Depas and Roperez, et al." for kidnapping with ransom and robbery in band. Meanwhile, Atienza Jr., his wife Connie and all their children migrated to Australia due to the trauma. The remaining 2 other suspects were later arrested. On April 19, 2007, the Philippine Court of Appeals rendered a Decision penned by Justices Mariflor Castillo, Rodrigo Cosico and Rosemarie Carandang, affirming with modification the September 3, 2003, judgment of the Malolos City, Bulacan Court. Felipe Montaos and Eduardo Soriano were released for lack of evidence while Gerardo Roperez was acquitted and ordered released. Accused Pablo, Depas and Anora were found guilty of the crimes of kidnapping with ransom and simple robbery and meted the capital punishment of Reclusion Perpetua or life imprisonment and indeterminate penalty of 6 months as minimum to maximum of six years, respectively. They were ordered to pay Atienza Jr. P 3.7 million as actual damages.

Meanwhile, Atienza, Jr.'s jewelry business continued at his office at Saluysoy, Meycauayan, Bulacan. He returned to the Philippines in 2001 to testify in the case and brought home his family from Australia after 7 years.

On or about June 2020, Atienza, Jr. tested positive for COVID-19, following the release of the result of his RT-PCR test. He was rushed to the St. Luke's Medical Center – Quezon City intensive care unit and suffered a 50/50 chance — fight, but later recovered.
