= 2019 Meycauayan local elections =

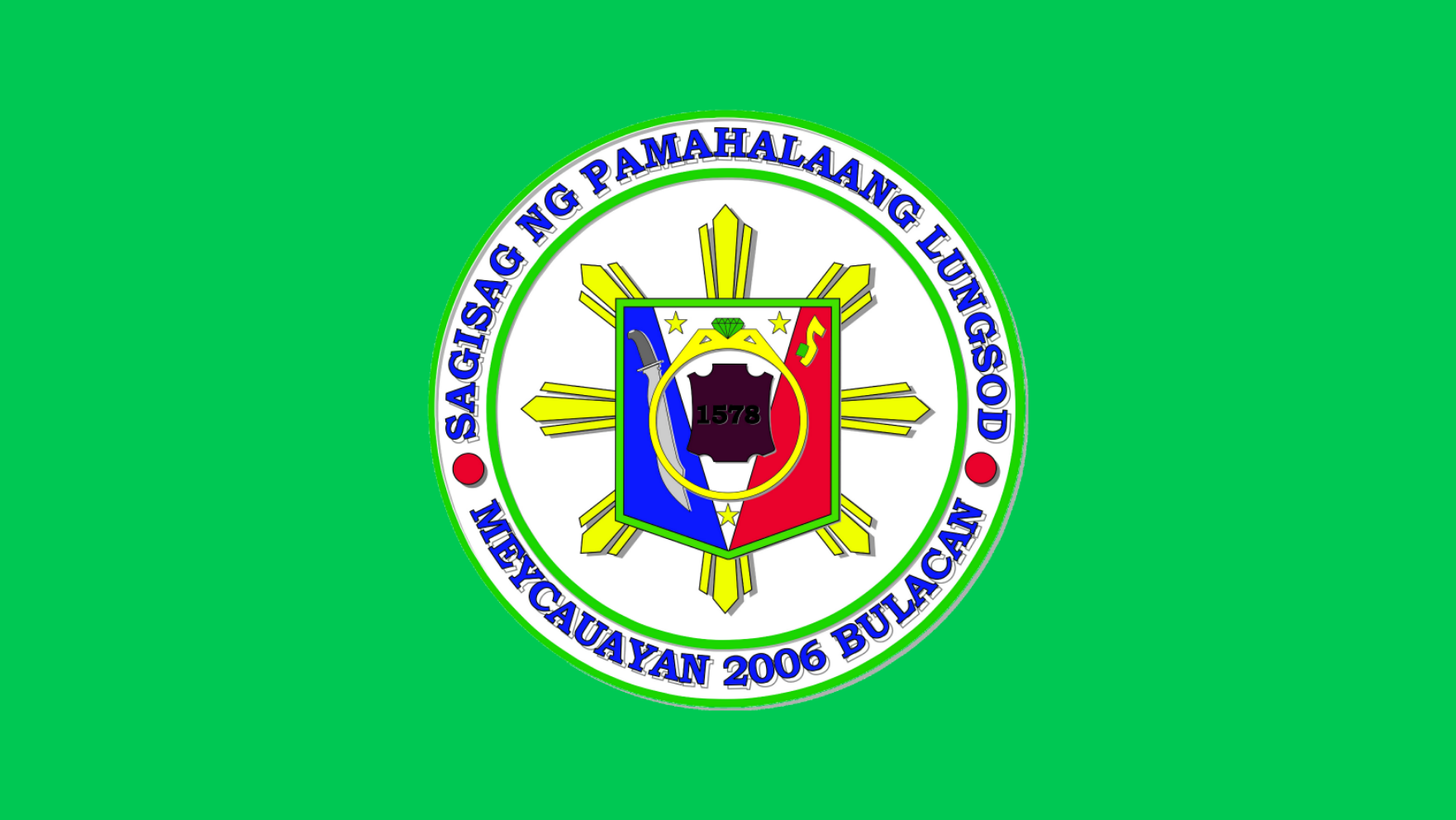
- May 13, 2019
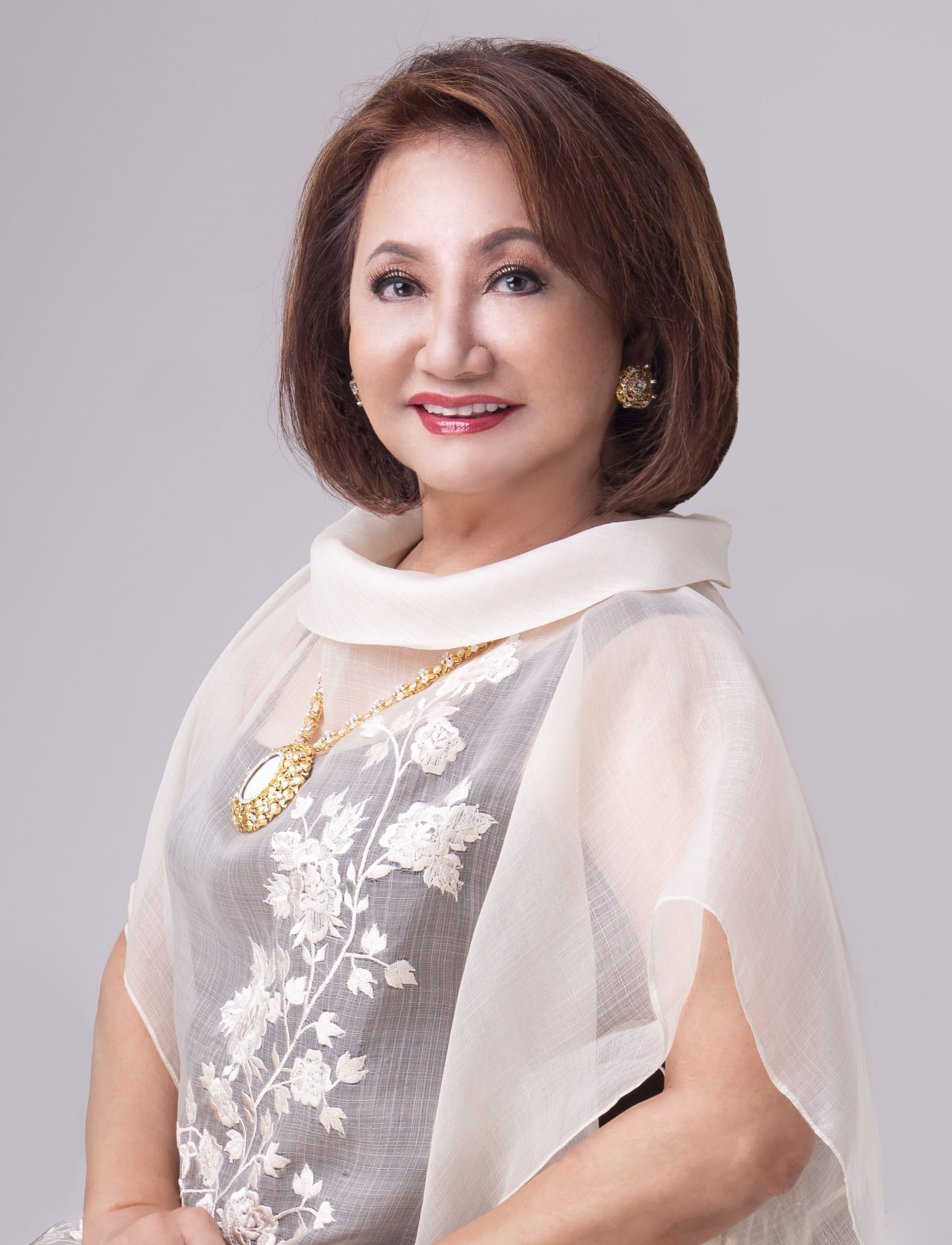
Nominee	Linabelle Villarica	Klaus Meine Ryan Cayanan
Party	PDP–Laban	Independent
Running mate	Jojie Violago	N/A
Popular vote	44,774	40,848
Percentage	52.29	47.70
Mayor before election
Henry Villarica
Liberal
Elected mayor
Linabelle Villarica
PDP–Laban

Local elections were held in Meycauayan, Bulacan on May 13, 2019 within the Philippine general election in 2019 Bulacan local elections. The voters will elect for the elective local posts in the municipality: the mayor, vice mayor, and ten councilors.

== Mayor ==
Incumbent Mayor Henry Villarica is running for Congressman of 4th district; his wife, Deputy Speaker and Congresswoman Linabelle Villarica will be running for Mayor.

Meycauayan City mayoral election
Party	Candidate	Votes	%
PDP–Laban	Linabelle Villarica	44,774	52.29
Independent	Klaus Meine Ryan Cayanan	40,848	47.70
Total votes		85,592	100.00
PDP–Laban hold			

== Vice Mayor ==
Incumbent Vice Mayor Rafael "Jojo" Manzano is term-limited, his party nominates incumbent Councilor Jojie Violago and will run unopposed.

Meycauayan City Vice mayoral election
Party	Candidate	Votes	%
PDP–Laban	Jojie Violago	66,791	100.00
Total votes		66,791	100.00
PDP–Laban hold			

== City Council election ==
Election is via plurality-at-large voting: A voter votes for up to ten candidates, then the ten candidates with the highest number of votes are elected.

Meycauayan City Council election
Party	Candidate	Votes	%
PDP–Laban	Kat Hernandez	60,193	9.91
PDP–Laban	Cathy Abacan	57,201	9.41
PDP–Laban	Cocoy Dulalia	51,379	8.45
PDP–Laban	Mario Aguirre	49,788	8.19
PDP–Laban	Cindy Paguio	47,140	7.76
PDP–Laban	Bunny Velasco	43,835	7.21
PDP–Laban	Mar Berboso	42,885	7.06
Independent	Done Manzano-Bañez	39,000	6.42
PDP–Laban	Atty. Lara Abracero	38,951	6.41
Independent	Kap Ching Macatulad	33,680	5.54
PDP–Laban	Tomas Rosales	33,656	5.54
PDP–Laban	ABC Duya	33,199	5.46
Independent	Celso Legaspi, Jr.	21,087	3.47
Independent	Bunso Lunaria	19,936	3.28
Lakas	Cesar Banigued	18,964	3.12
Lakas	Abelardo Aban	16,446	2.70
Total votes		607,340	100.00
