= Bulacan's 4th congressional district =

House of Representatives of the Philippines legislative district

- Constituency for the House of Representatives of the Philippines
- Boundary of Bulacan's 4th congressional district in Bulacan
- Location of Bulacan within the Philippines
- Province: Bulacan
- Region: Central Luzon
- Population: 540,104 (2020)
- Electorate: 287,554 (2025)
- Major settlements: 3 LGUs: Cities; Meycauayan; Municipalities; Marilao; Obando
- Area: 117.94 km^{2} (45.54 sq mi)

Current constituency
- Created: 1987
- Representative: Linabelle Villarica
- Political party: PFP
- Congressional bloc: Majority

Bulacan's 4th congressional district is one of the seven congressional districts of the Philippines in the province of Bulacan. It has been represented in the House of Representatives since 1987. The district consists of the city of Meycauayan and adjacent municipalities in southern Bulacan, namely Marilao and Obando. It also consisted the city of San Jose del Monte until 2004 and the municipality of Santa Maria until 2022. It is currently represented in the 20th Congress by Linabelle Villarica of the Partido Federal ng Pilipinas (PFP).

== Representation history ==
#	Image	Member	Term of office		Congress	Party	Electoral history	Constituent LGUs
#	Image	Member	Start	End	Congress	Party	Electoral history	Constituent LGUs
=== Bulacan's 4th district for the House of Representatives of the Philippines ===
District created February 2, 1987.
1		Rogaciano M. Mercado	June 30, 1987	November 13, 1989	8th	Lakas ng Bansa	Elected in 1987. Died.	1987–2004; Marilao, Meycauayan, Obando, San Jose del Monte, Santa Maria
2		Angelito M. Sarmiento	June 30, 1992	March 26, 2001	9th	Lakas	Elected in 1992.	1987–2004; Marilao, Meycauayan, Obando, San Jose del Monte, Santa Maria
2		Angelito M. Sarmiento	June 30, 1992	March 26, 2001	10th	Lakas	Re-elected in 1995.	1987–2004; Marilao, Meycauayan, Obando, San Jose del Monte, Santa Maria
2		Angelito M. Sarmiento	June 30, 1992	March 26, 2001	11th	Lakas	Re-elected in 1998. Resigned on appointment as Presidential Adviser on Agricultural Modernization.	1987–2004; Marilao, Meycauayan, Obando, San Jose del Monte, Santa Maria
-	vacant		March 26, 2001	June 30, 2001	11th	No special election to fill vacancy.		1987–2004; Marilao, Meycauayan, Obando, San Jose del Monte, Santa Maria
3		Reylina G. Nicolas	June 30, 2001	June 30, 2010	12th	Lakas	Elected in 2001.	1987–2004; Marilao, Meycauayan, Obando, San Jose del Monte, Santa Maria
3		Reylina G. Nicolas	June 30, 2001	June 30, 2010	13th	Lakas	Re-elected in 2004.	2004–2022; Marilao, Meycauayan, Obando, Santa Maria
3		Reylina G. Nicolas	June 30, 2001	June 30, 2010	14th	Lakas	Re-elected in 2007.	2004–2022; Marilao, Meycauayan, Obando, Santa Maria
4		Linabelle R. Villarica	June 30, 2010	June 30, 2019	15th	Liberal	Elected in 2010.	2004–2022; Marilao, Meycauayan, Obando, Santa Maria
4		Linabelle R. Villarica	June 30, 2010	June 30, 2019	16th	Liberal	Re-elected in 2013.	2004–2022; Marilao, Meycauayan, Obando, Santa Maria
4		Linabelle R. Villarica	June 30, 2010	June 30, 2019	17th	PDP–Laban	Re-elected in 2016.	2004–2022; Marilao, Meycauayan, Obando, Santa Maria
5		Henry R. Villarica	June 30, 2019	June 30, 2022	18th	PDP–Laban	Elected in 2019.	2004–2022; Marilao, Meycauayan, Obando, Santa Maria
(4)		Linabelle R. Villarica	June 30, 2022	Incumbent	19th	PDP–Laban	Elected in 2022.	2022–present Marilao, Meycauayan, Obando
(4)		Linabelle R. Villarica	June 30, 2022	Incumbent	20th	PFP	Re-elected in 2025.	2022–present Marilao, Meycauayan, Obando

== Election history ==
=== 2025 ===
Candidate	Party	Votes	%
Linabelle Villarica (incumbent)	PFP	155,351	70.64
Andre Santos	NUP	43,012	19.56
Abe Bordador	Independent	14,611	6.64
Demy Bautista	Independent	4,113	1.87
Ferdie Victolero	Independent	1,441	0.66
Ernesto Padernos	Independent	1,389	0.63
Total		219,917	100.00
Registered voters/turnout		287,554	–
PFP hold			
Source: Commission on Elections

=== 2022 ===
2022 Philippine House of Representatives election in Bulacan's 4th District
Party	Candidate	Votes	%
PDP–Laban	Linabelle Villarica	180,067	91.01
Aksyon	Raquel Guardiano	11,476	5.80
PRP	Ferdy Victolero	6,303	3.18
Total votes		197,846	100
PDP–Laban hold			

=== 2019 ===
2019 Philippine House of Representatives election in Bulacan's 4th District
Party	Candidate	Votes	%
PDP–Laban	Atorni Henry Villarica	191,992	100
Total votes		191,992	100
PDP–Laban hold			

=== 2016 ===
2016 Philippine House of Representatives election in Bulacan 4th District.
Party	Candidate	Votes	%
Liberal	Linabelle Villarica	216,963	84%
NPC	Joan Alarilla	40,043	16%
Total votes		257,006	100%
Liberal hold			

=== 2013 ===
2013 Philippine House of Representatives election at Bulacan's 4th district
Party	Candidate	Votes	%
Liberal	Linabelle Villarica	183,983	90.82%
Independent	Jovel Lopez	18,598	9.18%
Margin of victory			
Rejected ballots			
Turnout		202,581	100%
Liberal hold			

=== 2010 ===
Philippine House of Representatives election at Bulacan's 4th district
Party	Candidate	Votes	%
Liberal	Linabelle Villarica	178,643	81.01
Lakas–Kampi	Salvador Pleyto	27,072	12.28
PDP–Laban	Jovel Lopez	14,807	6.71
Total votes		244,859	100.00
Liberal gain from Lakas–Kampi			

=== 2007 ===
Philippine House of Representatives election at Bulacan's 4th district
Party	Candidate	Votes	%
Lakas	Reylina Nicolas	88,121	48.94
KAMPI	Salvador Pleyto	60,260	33.47
UNO	Rudolph Bryan De Silva	31,666	17.59
Total votes		180,047	100.00
Lakas hold			

== See also ==
- Legislative districts of Bulacan
