= Linabelle Villarica =

Filipino politician (born 1949)

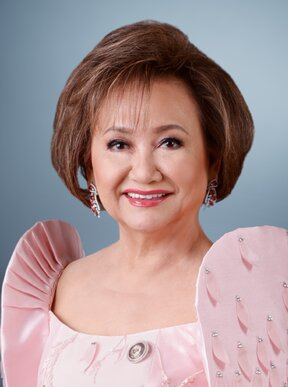
- Official portrait, 2026

Member of the Philippine House of Representatives from the Bulacan's 4th congressional district
- Incumbent
- Assumed office June 30, 2022
- Preceded by: Henry Villarica
- In office June 30, 2010 – June 30, 2019
- Preceded by: Reylina Nicolas
- Succeeded by: Henry Villarica

Deputy Speaker of the House of Representatives
- In office August 9, 2017 – June 30, 2019 Serving with several others
- House Speaker: Pantaleon Alvarez; Gloria Macapagal Arroyo

Mayor of Meycauayan
- In office June 30, 2019 – June 30, 2022
- Vice Mayor: Josefina Violago
- Preceded by: Henry Villarica
- Succeeded by: Henry Villarica

Personal details
- Born: July 25, 1949 (age 77) Banna, Ilocos Norte, Philippines
- Party: PFP (2023–present)
- Other political affiliations: PDP–Laban (2017–2023); Liberal (2009–2017)
- Spouse: Henry Villarica
- Children: 4
- Education: University of the Philippines Diliman (BA)

Linabelle Ruth Ramos Villarica (born July 25, 1949) is a Filipino politician who currently serves as the member of the House of Representatives from the 4th District of Bulacan since 2022 and previously from 2010 to 2019. She previously served as mayor of Meycauayan from 2019 to 2022.

== Early life and education ==
Linabelle Villarica was born on July 25, 1949, in Espiritu (now Banna), Ilocos Norte. She graduated at the University of the Philippines Diliman with a course of Bachelor of Arts in speech and drama.

== Political career ==
=== Congresswoman for the 4th District (2010–2019) ===
Villarica served as the member of the House of Representatives from the 4th District for nine years. She filed many house bills, including House Bill 4113 (100-Day Maternity Leave Bill). She served three terms in the House and also formerly served as Deputy Speaker.

=== Mayor of Meycauayan (2019–2022) ===
Villarica ran for mayor of Meycauayan in 2019 and won. She switched places with her husband Henry Villarica, who ran for congressman. She was sworn in on June 30, 2019.

=== Congresswoman for the 4th District (2022–present) ===
Villarica ran for a return to Congress, switching places once again with her husband Henry Villarica. They eventually won the elections.

== Personal life ==
Villarica is married to Henry Villarica, a former mayor of Meycauayan and now congressman from Bulacan's 4th district. Their family runs the Villarica Pawnshop. They have four children together.

On March 26, 2020, after her husband tested positive for COVID-19, she was placed under home quarantine.
