= Uniqueness =

State or condition wherein someone or something is unlike anything else in comparison

Uniqueness is a state or condition wherein someone or something is unlike anything else in comparison, or is remarkable, or unusual. When used in relation to humans, it is often in relation to a person's personality, or some specific characteristics of it, signalling that it is unlike the personality traits that are prevalent in that individual's culture. When the term uniqueness is used in relation to an object, it is often within the realm of product, with the term being a factor used to publicize or market the product in order to make it stand out from other products within the same category.

== See also ==
- Loner
- Scarcity
