= Joan Alarilla =

Filipino politician

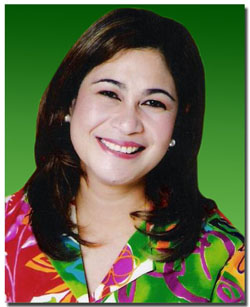

Mayor of Meycauayan
- In office June 30, 2007 – June 30, 2016
- Preceded by: Eduardo Alarilla
- Succeeded by: Henry Villarica

Personal details
- Born: Joan Velasco Philippines
- Party: NPC (2009-2012; 2015-present)
- Other political affiliations: Liberal (2012-2015); KAMPI (2007-2009)
- Spouse: Eduardo Alarilla Jr. (died 2009)
- Children: Judy Alarilla

Joan Velasco Alarilla is a Filipino politician who was mayor of Meycauayan from 2007 until 2016. Alarilla ran for the congressional seat for the 4th District in the 2016 elections, but she lost to Linabelle Villarica.

== Controversy ==
In March 2017, the Sandiganbayan found Alarilla guilty of serious dishonesty and grave misconduct. These include 'ghost projects', including the construction of basketball courts, kindergarten, and more. Following that, Ombudsman Conchita Carpio-Morales barred her from holding public office.

== Personal life ==
Alarilla was married to Eduardo Alarilla Jr., the former mayor of their city. He died of a lingering sickness on March 5, 2009.
