= Meycauayan College =

Private college in Bulacan, Philippines

- Dalubhasaan ng Meycauayan (Filipino)
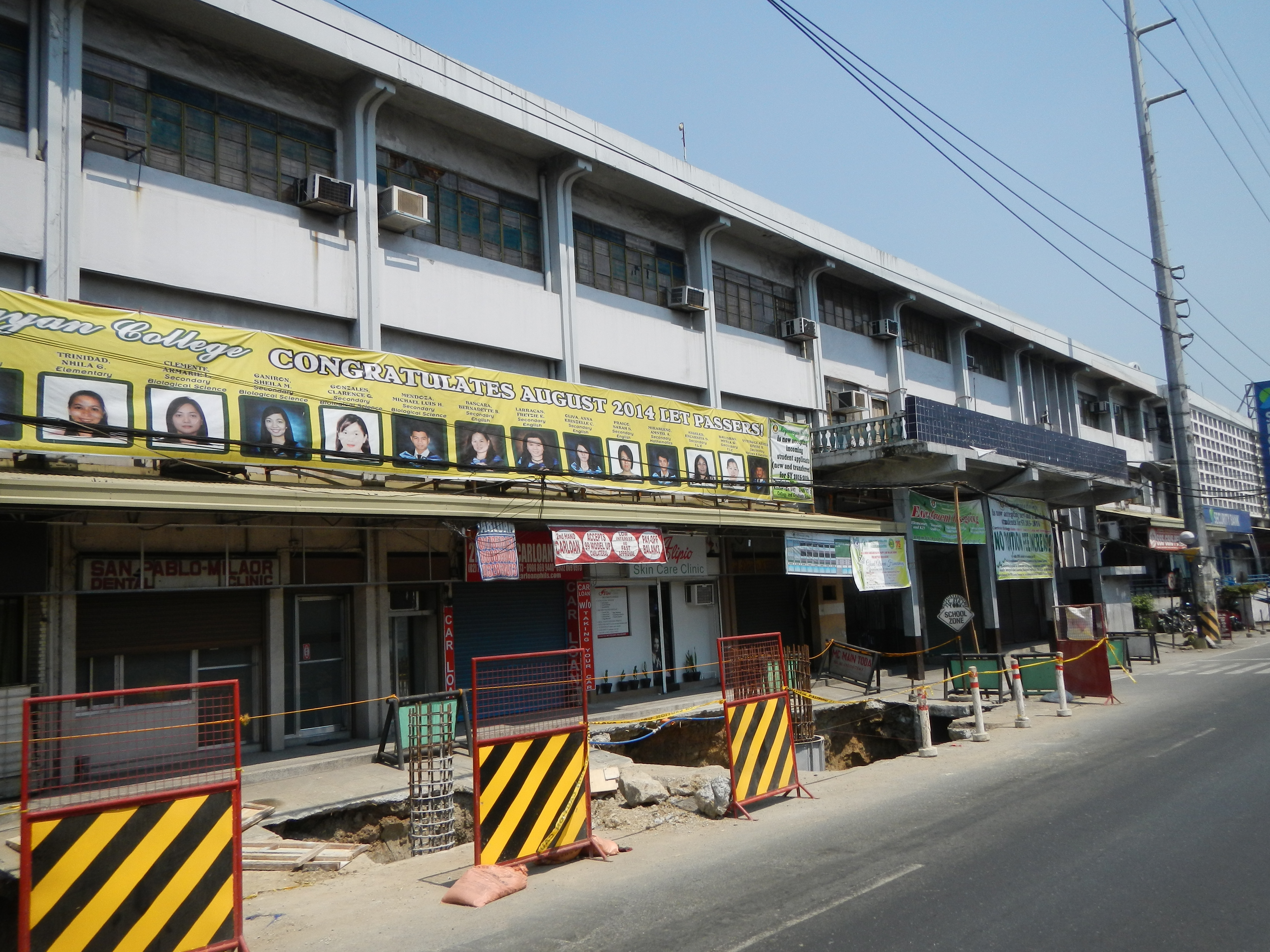
- Facade
- Other name: MC
- Former name: Meycauayan Institute (1925-1980)
- Type: Private Non-sectarian basic and higher education institution
- Established: 1925
- Chairman: Marcos S.C. Hermoso, CPA
- President: Renato Ocampo
- Dean: Atty. Aristeo Cruz, CPA
- Location: Meycauayan, Bulacan, Philippines; 14°44′01″N 120°57′42″E
- Campus: Calvario, Meycauayan Main Campus | Malhacan, Meycauayan City Annex Campus
- Medium of instruction: English & Filipino
- Colors: Green and Gold
- Website: meyc-college.edu.ph
- Location in Bulacan Location in Luzon Location in the Philippines

Meycauayan College, is a private, non-sectarian basic and higher education institution in Meycauayan City, Philippines. It was established in 1925 and initially named Meycauayan Institute.

== History ==
Meycauayan College then named Meycauayan Institute is the first private high school in the then municipality of Meycauayan, Bulacan.

In 1980, the Meycauayan Institute was renamed Meycauayan College. The first college graduation was held in May 1981. From 1981 to 2004, the College Department has graduated 4,422 alumni and produced certified public accountants (CPAs) and licensed teachers. The Department of Education, Culture and Sports granted a permit to Meycauayan College to open its Child Study Center in 1985. Consequently, the Elementary Department was established.

A few years later, in the tertiary level, new courses were added — Bachelor in Elementary Education (1987) and Bachelor of Science in Accountancy (1990) — to replace BSC major in Accounting. In 1991, the Banking and Finance Course was changed to Financial Management. In 1993, Master of Arts in Education major in Psychology, English, Mathematics, Administration and Supervision, Physical Education and Educational Management was offered to cater the growing demands for higher education.

The school was granted permission by the Commission on Higher Education (CHED) to offer Bachelor of Science in Computer Science (BSCS) in 1995. In 2003, the college offered Associate in Computer Technology, a two-year course in computer science. In April 2008, the revised and ladderized curriculum of BSCS was approved.

October 2008, the CHED gave 'Government Recognition' to operate Bachelor of Science in Hospitality Management (BSHM). A 'Government Permit' was granted to Meycauayan College to operate the first and second year levels of the Bachelor of Science in Travel Management (BSTRM) program and Bachelor of Science in Accounting Technology (BSAT).

Additional courses were added in the academic programs such as Bachelor of Science in Legal Management (BSLM), Bachelor of Science in Social Work (BSSW), Bachelor of Science in Criminology (BSCrim), Bachelor of Library and Information Science (BLIS), and Bachelor of Physical Education (BPE).

== Academic programs ==
=== Basic education ===
- Elementary Level
- Secondary Level (Official Testing Center of UPCAT – University of the Philippines College Admission Test Regular and Special Science Class)
- Child Study Center

=== Tertiary education ===
==== Accountancy ====
- Bachelor of Science in Accountancy
- Bachelor of Science in Accounting Technology (BSAT)
- Bachelor of Science in Legal Management (BSLM)

==== Business Administration ====
- Bachelor of Science in Business Administration (BSBA) with majors in* Financial Management, Management, and Marketing.

==== Education, Arts and Sciences ====
- Bachelor in Elementary Education (BEED): Pre-School Education (PSEd), Generalist
- Bachelor of Secondary Education (BSE): Biological Science, English, Filipino, Mathematics
- Bachelor of Arts in Psychology (AB Psych)
- Bachelor of Science in Social Work (BSSW)
- Bachelor of Library Information Science (BLIS)
- Bachelor of Physical Education (BPE): School PE, Sports and Wellness Management
- Continuing Professional Teacher Education (CPTE) 18 Units

==== Computer Studies ====
- Bachelor of Science in Computer Science (BSCS)
- Associate in Computer Technology (ACT) (two-year course)

==== Hospitality Management and Related Programs ====
- Bachelor of Science in Hospitality Management (BSHM)
- Bachelor of Science in Travel Management (BSTrM)

==== Criminal Justice Education ====
- Bachelor of Science in Criminology (BSCrim)

=== Graduate school ===
==== Master of Arts in education ====
Majors in:

- Administration and Supervision
- Educational Management
- English (Language Teaching)
- Filipino
- Mathematics
- Physical Education
- Psychology

== Student organizations ==
- Supreme Student Council(SSC)
- The College Chronicle(TCC)
- Junior Philippine Institute of Accountants(JPIA)
- Junior Accounting Technology Society(JATS)
- Psychology Society(PSYCHSOC)
- Hotelier Society of Meycauayan College(HSMC)
- Future Mentors' Society(FMS)
- Vanguards of Peace and Justice(VOPJ)
- Junior Council of Business Executives(JCBE)
- Junior Financial Executives(JFINEX)
