= Henry Villarica =

Filipino lawyer and politician

Mayor of Meycauayan
- Incumbent
- Assumed office June 30, 2022
- Vice Mayor: Jojie Violago
- Preceded by: Linabelle Villarica
- In office June 30, 2016 – June 30, 2019
- Vice Mayor: Rafael Manzano Jr.
- Preceded by: Joan Alarilla
- Succeeded by: Linabelle Villarica

Member of the Philippine House of Representatives for the Bulacan's 4th congressional district
- In office June 30, 2019 – June 30, 2022
- Preceded by: Linabelle Villarica
- Succeeded by: Linabelle Villarica

Personal details
- Born: Henry Resurreccion Villarica; August 5, 1945 (age 81) Meycauayan, Bulacan, Philippines
- Party: PFP (2023–present)
- Other political affiliations: PDP–Laban (2016–2023); Liberal (2015–2016)
- Spouse: Linabelle Villarica
- Education: University of the Philippines
- Occupation: Businessman, politician
- Profession: Lawyer

Henry Resurreccion Villarica (born August 5, 1945), also known as Atorni Henry, is a Filipino lawyer, businessman, and politician who is currently serving as City Mayor of Meycauayan. He previously served as Mayor from 2016 until 2019, and served as the member of the Philippine House of Representatives from the 4th District of Bulacan from 2019 until 2022. He is also the president of Villarica Pawnshop, which was founded by his parents.

== Early life and education ==
Henry Villarica was born on August 5, 1945, in Meycauayan, Bulacan. He is the son of Quirino Villarica and Paz Resurreccion Villarica. His mother was a councilor of then-municipality of Meycauayan. His parents founded Villarica Pawnshop in 1954. Its first branch was set up in Manila. After the death of his mother, Villarica was assisted by his wife, Linabelle Villarica, in opening a second outlet in Makati in 1982, which is called Tiffany House of Jewels. The pawnshop is expanding in the rest of the country.

Villarica was a topnotcher in the 1971 Philippine Bar Examination, receiving the score of 92.40 percent. He was surpassed by students in the next bar exams, including incumbent senator Koko Pimentel. Villarica worked as an attorney.

== Political career ==
=== Mayor of Meycauayan (2016–2019) ===
Villarica, along with vice mayor Rafael Manzano Jr. and all candidates for councilor, was running under the Liberal Party banner in 2016. On May 9, 2016, Villarica won the election by landslide, receiving 73.5 of the votes. He defeated Judy Alarilla, the daughter of mayors Eduardo and Joan Alarilla. He was sworn in as Mayor on June 30, 2016.

=== Congressman for 4th District (2019–2022) ===
Villarica did not stand for a second term, giving away to his wife, congresswoman Linabelle Villarica, who got term-limited for standing for reelection for fourth term. He ran unopposed for congressman for 4th District instead, while his wife ran for mayor. Villarica won his election as congressman on May 13, 2019.

One of his solutions is to convert the municipality of Santa Maria, which has the largest population and income, into a component city in the province of Bulacan.

== Personal life ==
Villarica is married to incumbent mayor Linabelle Villarica, a native of Banna, Ilocos Norte. They have four children living with them. He resides in Meycauayan, Bulacan.

=== Health ===
On March 18, 2020, Villarica was hospitalized in a private hospital, after he experienced pneumonia. House Secretary General Luis Montales announced on March 26, that Villarica was tested positive for COVID-19. He also said that Villarica was last reported for work on March 4. He recovered on March 31.

His wife, mayor Linabelle Villarica, despite the fact that she did not exhibit any symptoms, was quarantined at their home, after her close contact with him.
