= Meycauayan =

Component city in Bulacan, Philippines

- Component city
- City of Meycauayan
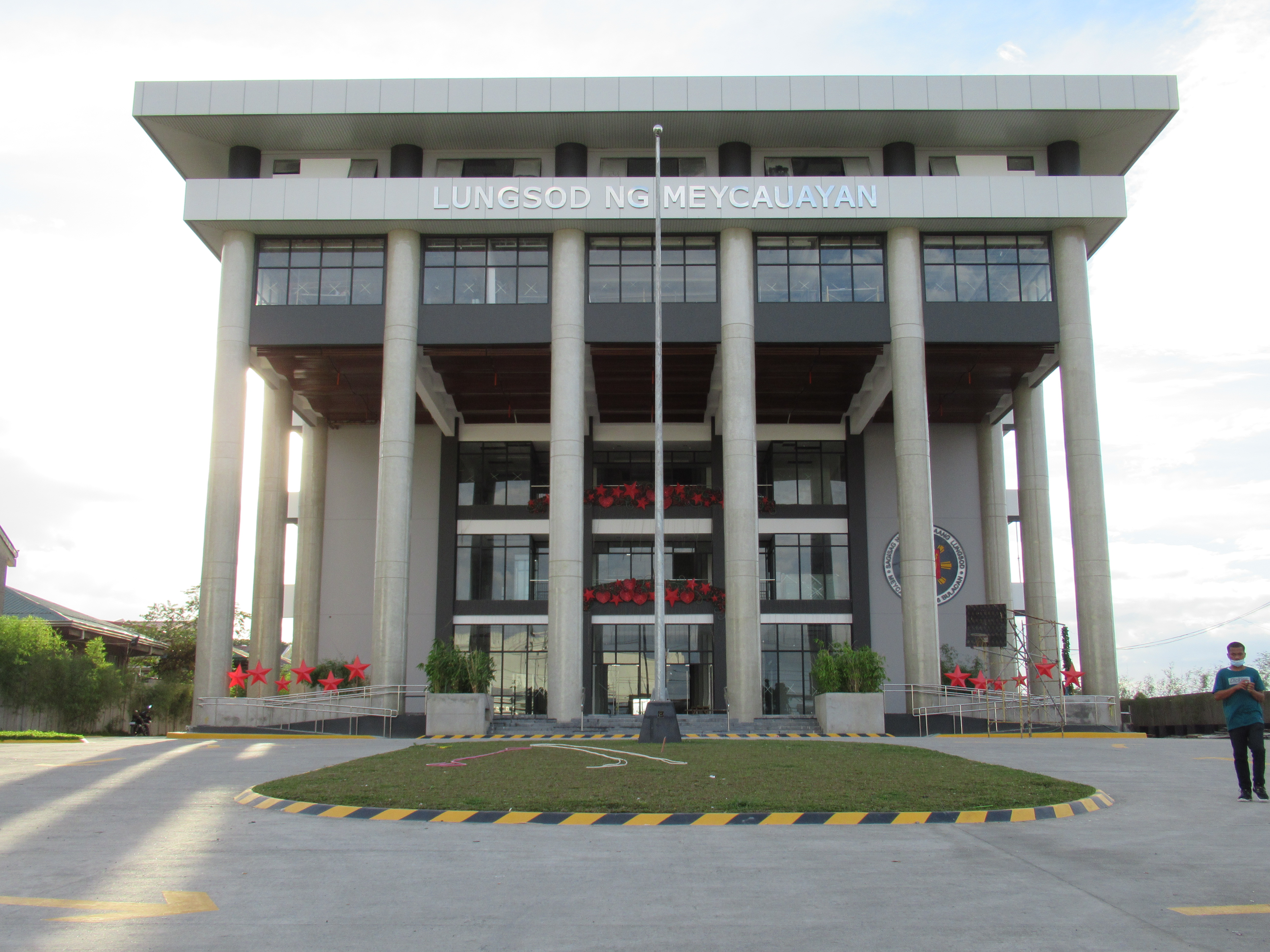
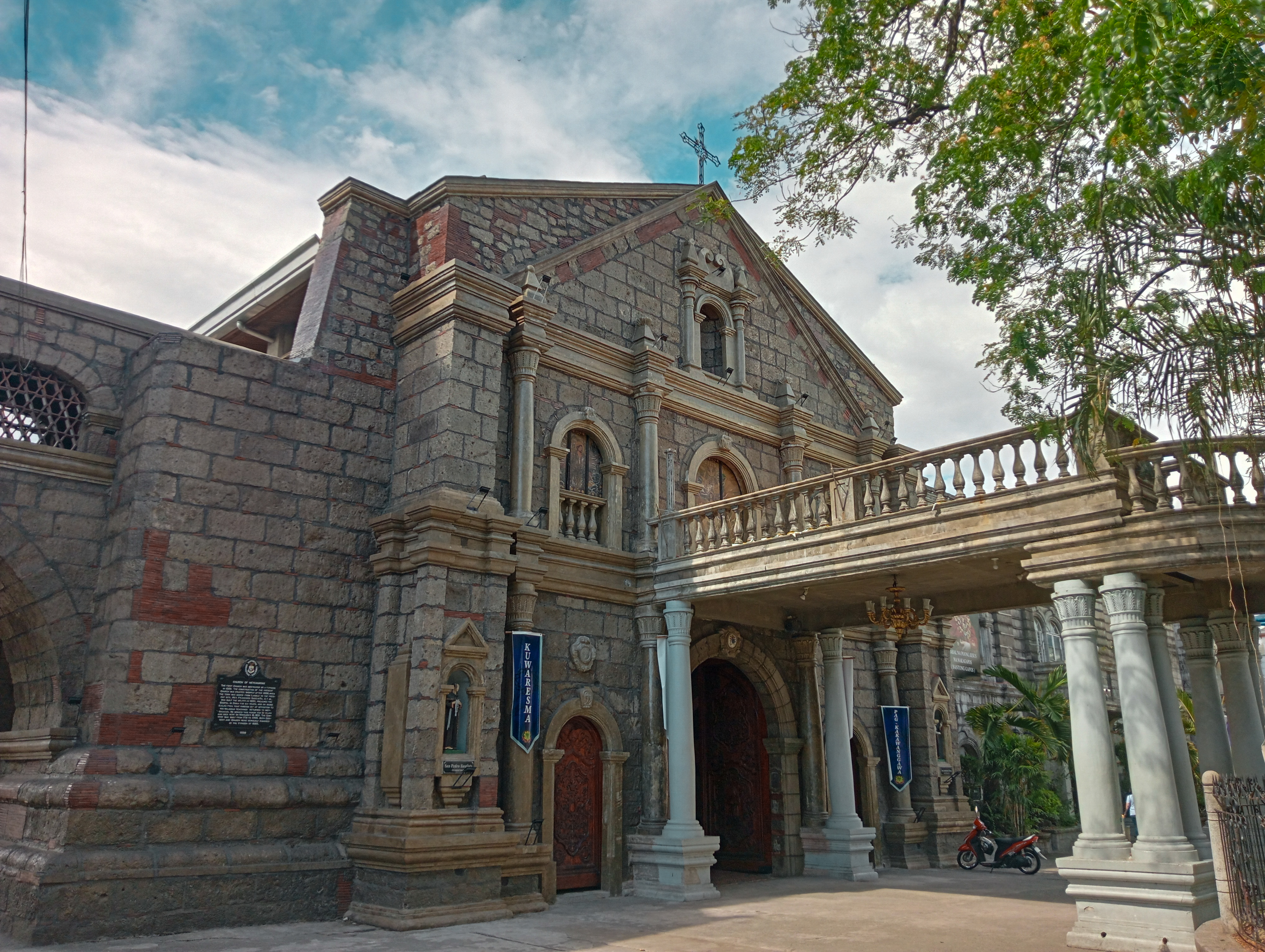
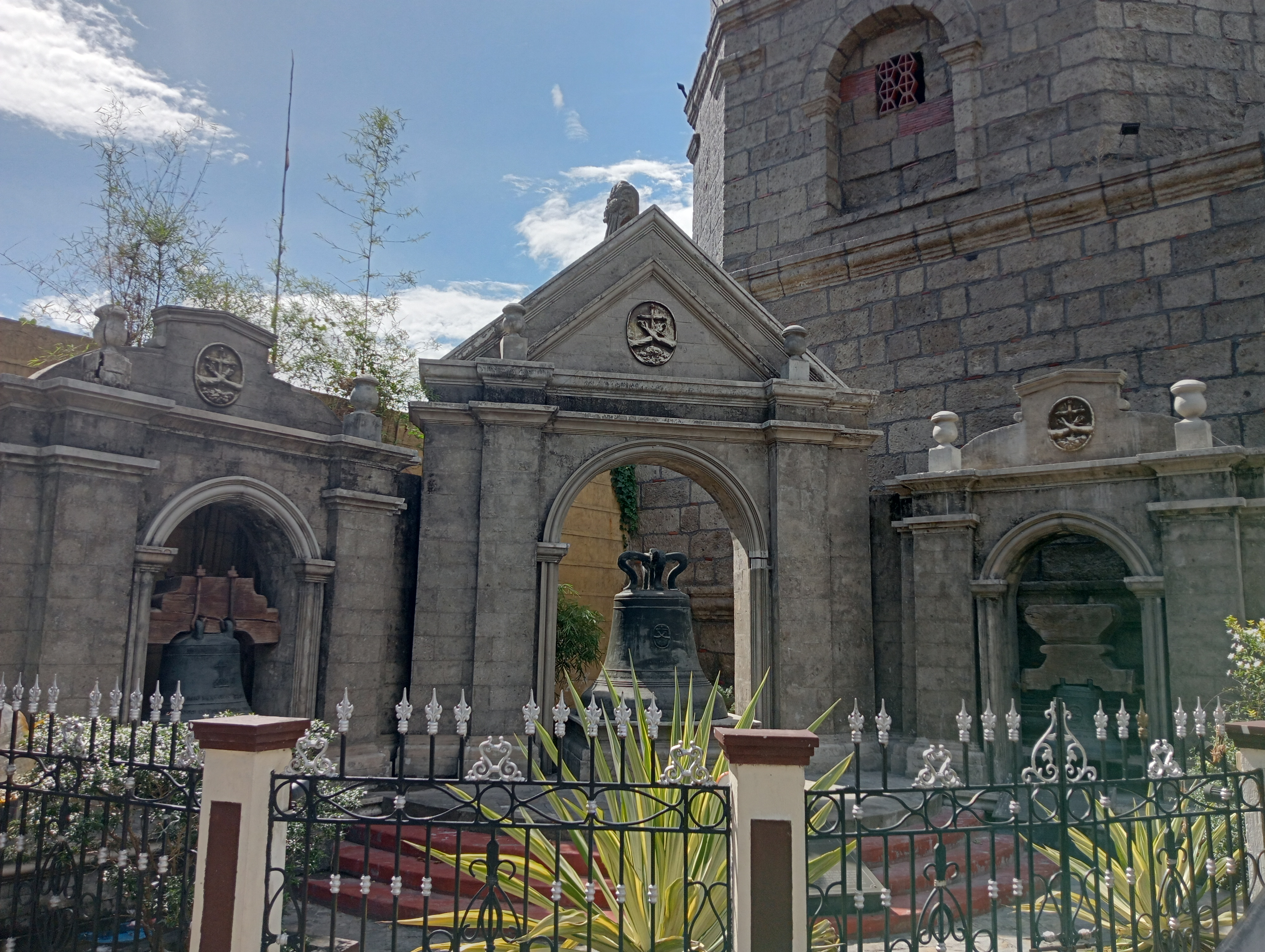
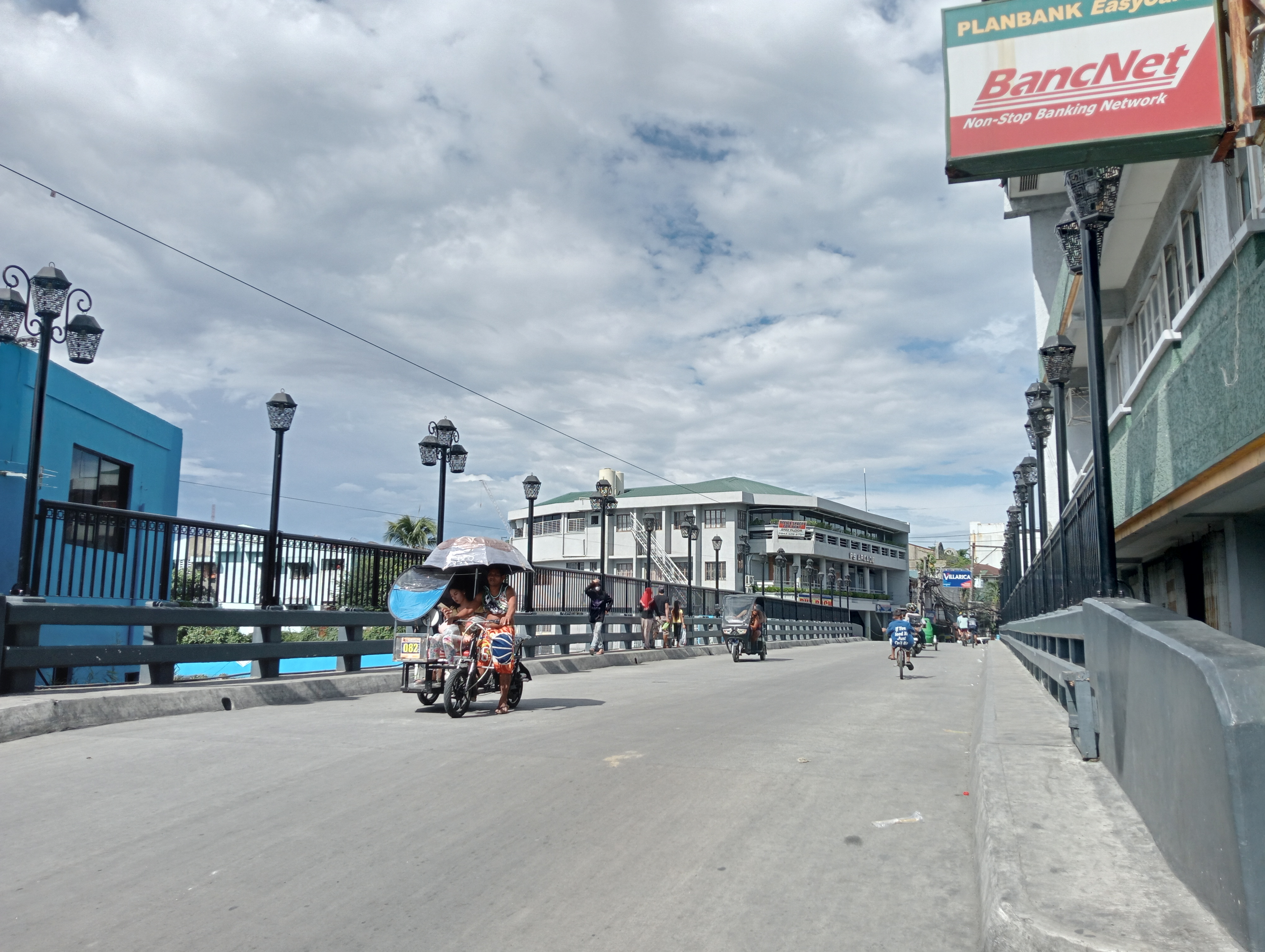
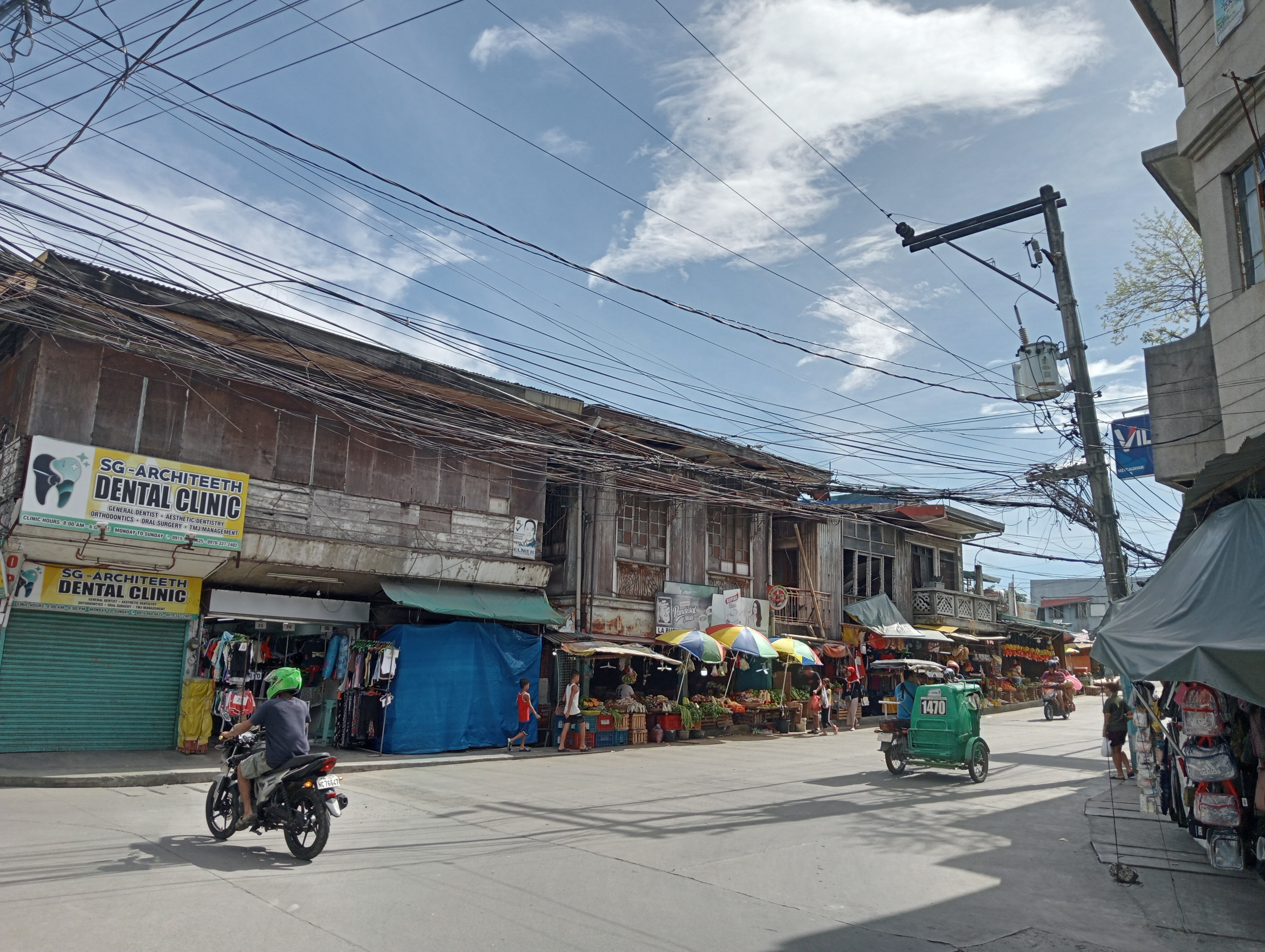
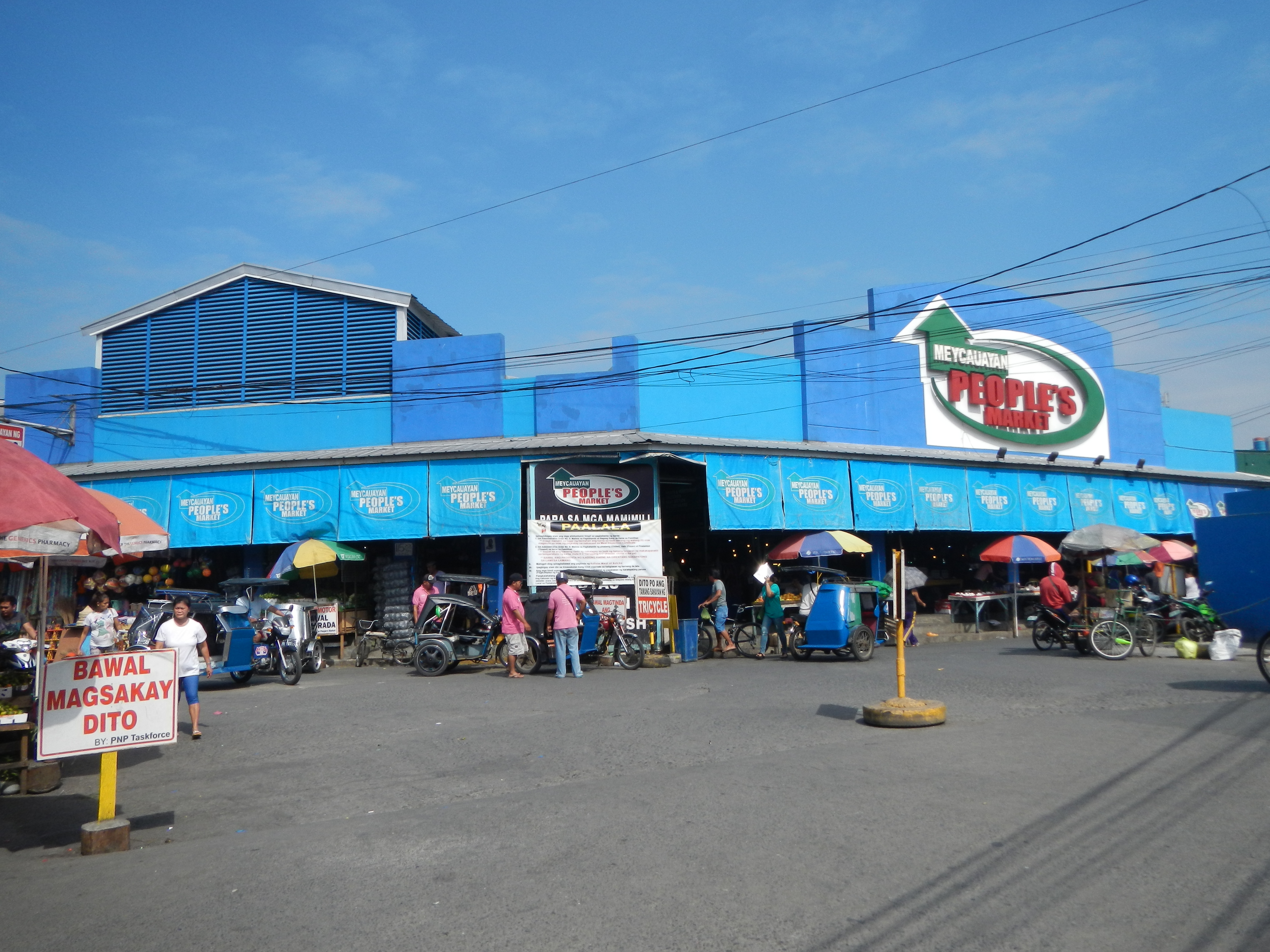
- (From top, left to right: Meycauayan City Hall • St. Francis of Assisi Parish Church • Meycauayan Church Three Bells • Poblacion Bridge • Meycauayan Poblacion • Meycauayan People's Market)

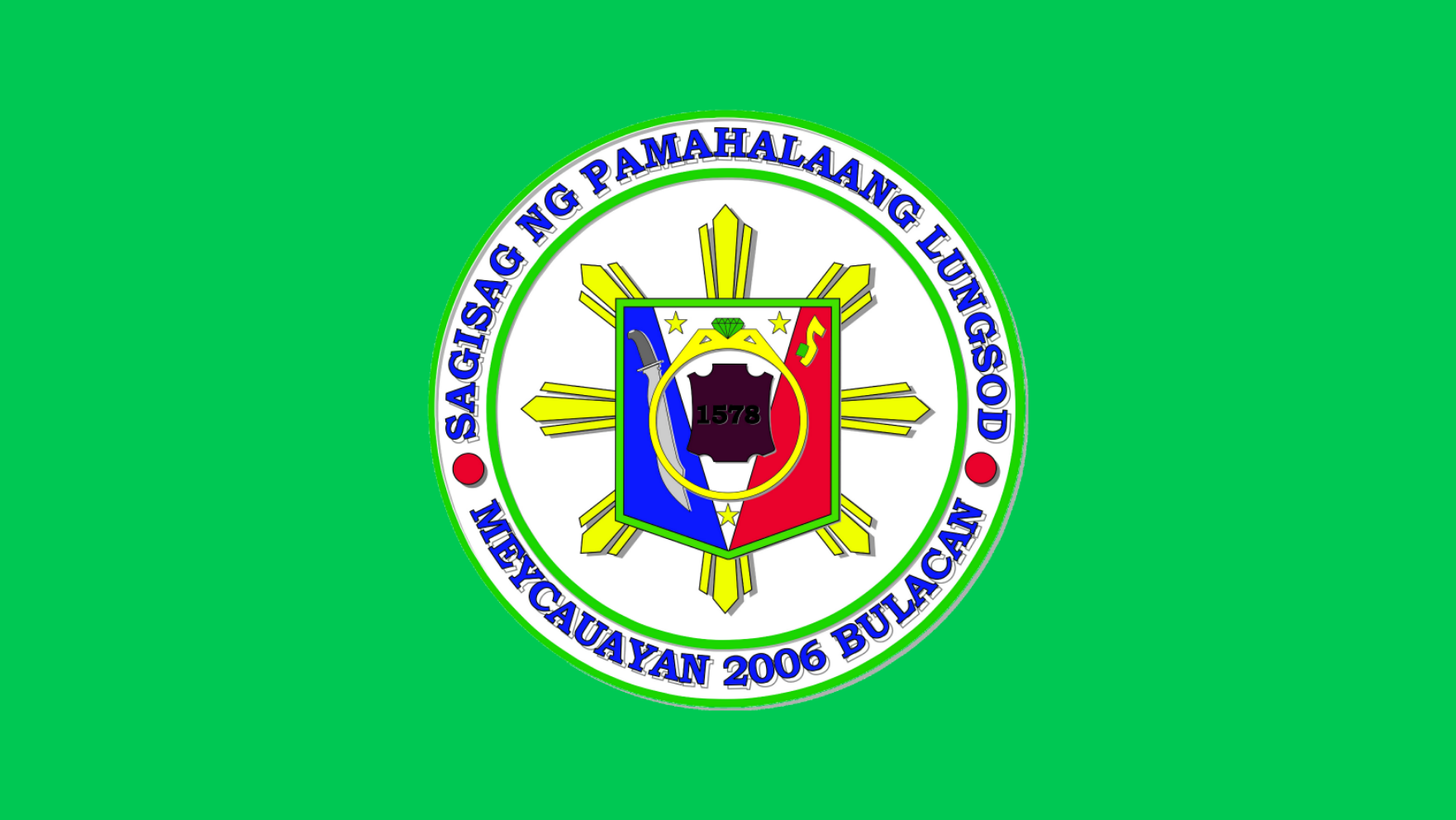
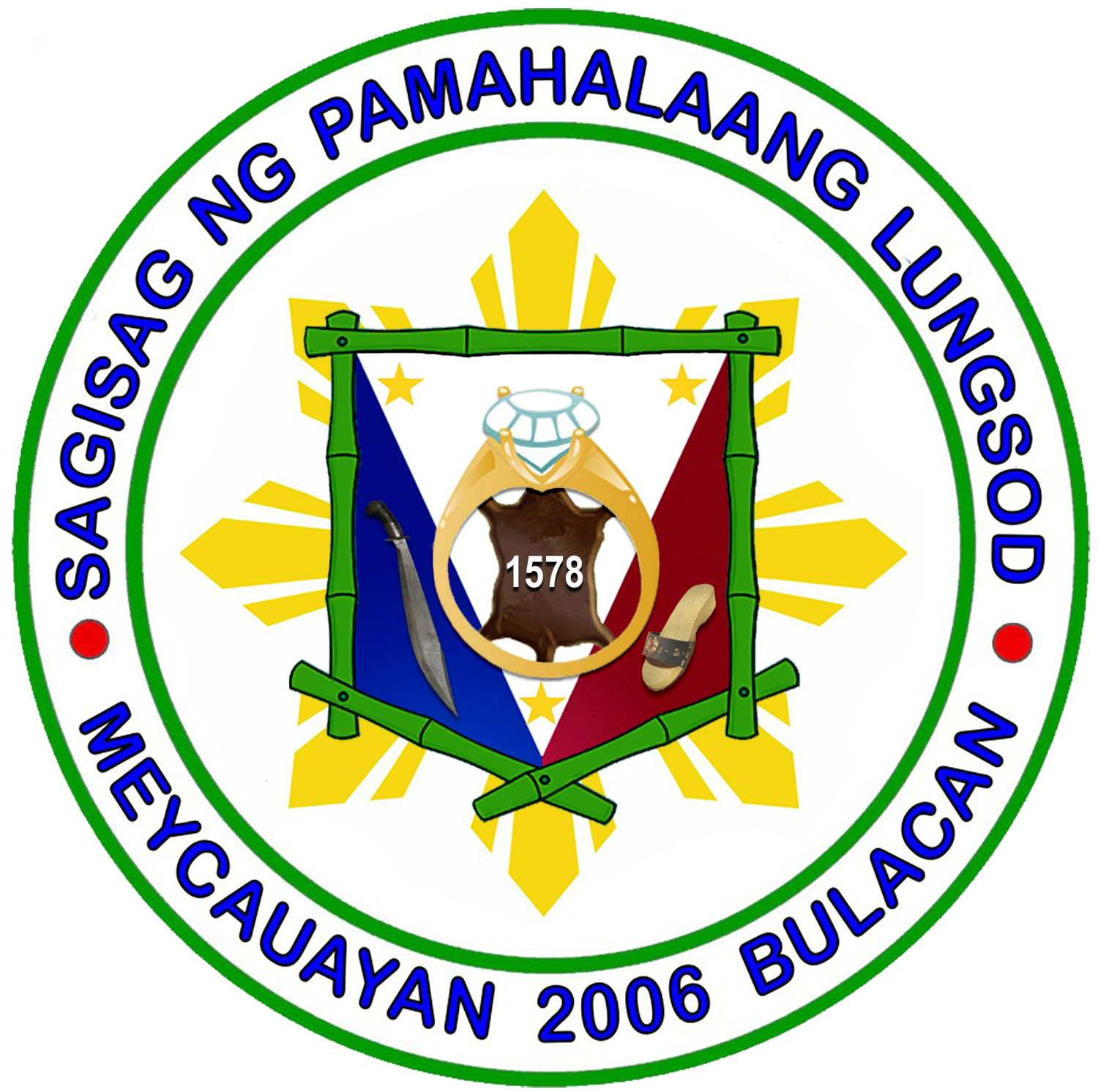
- Flag Seal
- Nickname: The Fine Jewelry Center of the Philippines
- Motto(s): "May Magandang Buhay sa Meycauayan"; English: "There is a Beautiful Life in Meycauayan"
- Anthem: Awit ng Meycauayan (English: Song of Meycauayan)
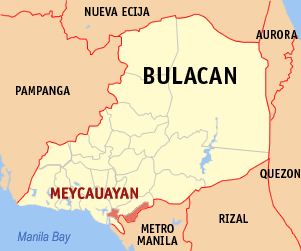
- Map of Bulacan with Meycauayan highlighted
- Interactive map of Meycauayan
- Location within the Philippines Meycauayan (Philippines)
- Coordinates: 14°44′N 120°58′E
- Country: Philippines
- Region: Central Luzon
- Province: Bulacan
- District: 4th district
- Founded: October 4, 1578
- Cityhood: December 10, 2006
- Barangays: 26 (see Barangays)

Government
  - Type: Sangguniang Panlungsod
  - Mayor: Henry R. Villarica (PFP)
  - Vice Mayor: Josefina O. Violago (PFP)
  - Representative: Linabelle Ruth R. Villarica (PFP)
  - City Council: Members: Henry Lester R. Villarica; Ronald S. Palomares; Christian M. Velasco; Catherine C. Abacan; Raoul M. Atadero; Georgina Marie S. Dulalia; Wilfredo DS. Macatulad; Mary Christine Z. Paguio; Larissa A. San Diego; Danilo B. Abacan Jr.
  - Electorate: 134,340 voters (2025)

Area
  - Total: 32.10 km^{2} (12.39 sq mi)
- Elevation: 20 m (66 ft)
- Highest elevation: 93 m (305 ft)
- Lowest elevation: −5 m (−16 ft)

Population (2024 census)
  - Total: 228,023
  - Density: 7,104/km^{2} (18,400/sq mi)
  - Households: 60,570

Economy
  - Income class: 1st city income class
  - Poverty incidence: 7.29% (2023)
  - Revenue: ₱ 2,579 million (2024)
  - Assets: ₱ 9,834 million (2024)
  - Expenditure: ₱ 1,570 million (2024)
  - Liabilities: ₱ 2,387 million (2024)

Utilities
  - Electricity: Meralco
- Time zone: UTC+8 (PST)
- ZIP code: 3020
- PSGC: 031412000
- IDD : area code: +63 (0)44
- Native languages: Tagalog
- Website: www.meycauayan.gov.ph

Meycauayan [meɪkɐˈwajan], officially the City of Meycauayan (Filipino: Lungsod ng Meycauayan), is a component city in the province of Bulacan, Philippines. According to the 2024 census, it has a population of 228,023 people.

The place got its name from the Tagalog words may kawayan which is literally translated to English as there is bamboo. It was formerly known as Mecabayan [mekəˈbajən], a Kapampangan name, and alternatively as Meycawayan.

== History ==
During the Spanish colonization of the country, the town of Meycauayan was established as a settlement by a group of Spanish priests belonging to the Franciscan Order. In 1578, its early inhabitants came into contact with Christianity. In that same year, Father Juan de Placencia and Diego Oropesa built the first church structure, which was believed to be made of nipa and bamboo. Common to all Spanish settlements in that period was the adoption of a patron saint for the newly opened town. Meycauayan has St. Francis of Assisi as the patron saint. It was only in 1668, however, that a concrete church structure was erected.

The 1818 Spanish census recorded the area having 2,375 native families and 16 Spanish-Filipino families. Meycauayan was then one of the largest towns in the province of Bulacan. The towns, which fell under its political jurisdiction, were San Jose del Monte, Bocaue, Valenzuela (formerly Polo), Obando, Marilao, Santa Maria and Pandi. It was also regarded as the unofficial capital of the province, being the hub of activities brought about by the establishment of the market center and the presence of the Spanish military detachment. During the Philippine Revolution, Meycauayan contributed its share in the fight against the Spanish colonizers. Among the residents who figured prominently in the revolution were: Andres Pacheco, Ciriaco Contreras, Guillermo Contreras, Guillermo Bonque, Tiburcio Zuela, and Liberato Exaltacion. There were many others who had joined the revolution and had displayed their exceptional heroism until 1898, when the country gained its independence from Spain.

Between 1901 and 1913, Marilao became part of Meycauayan.

In 1949, a big fire razed the market center and several business establishments in the town, causing setbacks to the development of the municipality. It took several years to recover from the destruction. However, in the 1960s and early part of 1970s, reconstruction and rehabilitation of infrastructure facilities were made possible through the assistance of the provincial and national governments. A more sound economic base was established and crop production more than doubled.

=== Cityhood ===
Meycauayan attempted cityhood twice. The first was filed by district representative Angelito Sarmiento, seeking the conversion of the then-municipality of Meycauayan into a component city, which was signed by President Gloria Macapagal Arroyo on March 5, 2001, as Republic Act No. 9021.

The plebiscite for the ratification, along with that of Cauayan, Isabela (by virtue of RA No. 9017 dated February 28), was scheduled by the Commission on Elections on March 30. The bid however failed, and Meycauayan remained a municipality. Meanwhile, affirmative votes won in the separate plebiscite in Cauayan.

For the second time, in another attempt for conversion, district representative Reylina Nicolas authored House Bill 4397 (dated July 24, 2006), which was later signed into law by President Arroyo as RA No. 9356 on October 2, 2006.

Meycauayan cityhood plebiscites
Choice	2001 1st attempt		2006 2nd attempt	
Choice	Votes	%	Votes	%
Yes	8,109	35.42%	8,247	59.01%
No	14,788	64.58%	5,728	40.99%
Total (valid) votes	22,897	100%	13,975	100%
Registered voters/turnout	—N/a	—N/a	118,339	11.81%
Result	No		Yes	
Sources				

A plebiscite was held on December 10, where the cityhood was eventually ratified and the proclamation was made in the evening. It was noted that compared to the first plebiscite, the second showed that only a little more than a hundred voters were added to those in favor of the conversion, as well as a sharp decline in the number of those who were against.

With the ratification, Meycauayan became Bulacan's third component city, following San Jose del Monte in 2000, and Malolos, whose loss in its cityhood bid in 1999 was reversed following a recount.

=== Contemporary ===
Today, Meycauayan has transformed into a major economic and industrial hub in the province of Bulacan and the rest of Central Luzon.

== Geography ==
The City of Meycauayan is generally surrounded with plain land and gentle rolling hills. Meycauayan is named for the Filipino phrase may kawayan that means "with bamboo". Averaging 20 meters above sea level, this terrain is an interweaving of greenery and concrete road network. The slope of the land dips towards a west to north westerly direction. River, natural lake and drainage waterways envelope and criss-cross the area.

The city is located 19 kilometers (12 mi) north of Manila and 26 kilometers (16 mi) south of Malolos City, the provincial capital city. It is bounded by the town of Marilao to the north, the two Metro Manila cities of Valenzuela to the south and Caloocan (North) to the east, and the town of Obando to the west.

=== Barangays ===
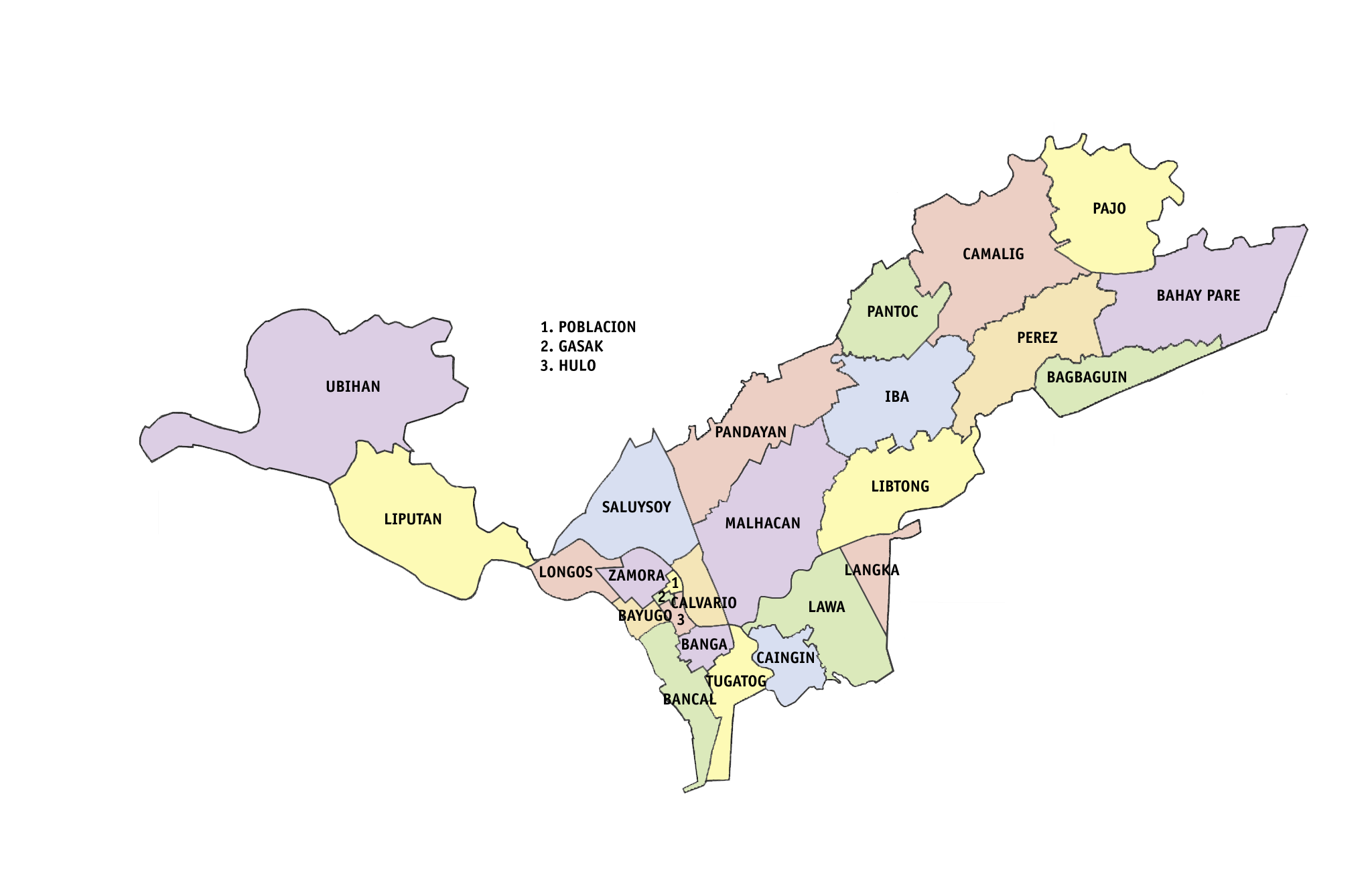
Political map of Meycauayan

Meycauayan is administratively subdivided into 26 urban barangays, as shown in the matrix below. Each barangay consists of puroks and some have sitios.

PSGC	Barangay	Population			±% p.a.	
		2024		2010		
031412001	Bagbaguin	3.4%	7,760	6,908	▴	0.81%
031412002	Bahay Pare	5.1%	11,568	10,221	▴	0.87%
031412003	Bancal	5.5%	12,589	14,242	▾	−0.86%
031412004	Banga	1.3%	2,913	2,911	▴	0.00%
031412005	Bayugo	8.1%	18,560	17,982	▴	0.22%
031417026	Caingin	2.4%	5,443	4,763	▴	0.93%
031412006	Calvario	2.3%	5,317	5,009	▴	0.42%
031412007	Camalig	3.9%	8,972	8,042	▴	0.76%
031412008	Hulo	0.7%	1,675	1,636	▴	0.16%
031412009	Iba	3.5%	8,032	7,450	▴	0.53%
031412010	Langka	1.7%	3,871	3,179	▴	1.38%
031412011	Lawa	5.6%	12,854	13,392	▾	−0.29%
031412012	Libtong	4.6%	10,552	10,190	▴	0.24%
031412013	Liputan	0.7%	1,584	1,546	▴	0.17%
031412014	Longos	1.5%	3,412	3,300	▴	0.23%
031412015	Malhacan	9.7%	22,205	20,914	▴	0.42%
031412016	Pajo	2.7%	6,166	5,168	▴	1.24%
031412017	Pandayan	6.7%	15,264	14,703	▴	0.26%
031412018	Pantoc	5.2%	11,804	10,554	▴	0.78%
031412019	Perez	7.6%	17,251	15,779	▴	0.62%
031412020	Poblacion	0.2%	348	239	▴	2.65%
031412021	Saluysoy	4.5%	10,347	10,603	▾	−0.17%
031412022	Saint Francis (Gasak)	0.6%	1,288	1,286	▴	0.01%
031412023	Tugatog	1.9%	4,407	4,288	▴	0.19%
031412024	Ubihan	1.0%	2,225	2,279	▾	−0.17%
031412025	Zamora	2.4%	5,443	2,570	▴	5.36%
	Total		228,023	199,154	▴	0.95%

=== Climate ===
Climate data for Meycauayan City, Bulacan
Month	Jan	Feb	Mar	Apr	May	Jun	Jul	Aug	Sep	Oct	Nov	Dec	Year
Mean daily maximum °C (°F)	29 (84)	30 (86)	32 (90)	34 (93)	33 (91)	31 (88)	30 (86)	29 (84)	29 (84)	30 (86)	30 (86)	29 (84)	31 (87)
Mean daily minimum °C (°F)	20 (68)	20 (68)	21 (70)	23 (73)	24 (75)	25 (77)	24 (75)	24 (75)	24 (75)	23 (73)	22 (72)	21 (70)	23 (73)
Average precipitation mm (inches)	7 (0.3)	7 (0.3)	9 (0.4)	21 (0.8)	101 (4.0)	152 (6.0)	188 (7.4)	170 (6.7)	159 (6.3)	115 (4.5)	47 (1.9)	29 (1.1)	1,005 (39.7)
Average rainy days	3.3	3.5	11.1	8.1	18.9	23.5	26.4	25.5	24.5	19.6	10.4	6.4	181.2
Source: Meteoblue

== Demographics ==
Population census of Meycauayan
Year	Pop.	±% p.a.
1903	9,742	—
1918	11,285	+0.99%
1939	16,082	+1.70%
1948	21,695	+3.38%
1960	32,234	+3.35%
1970	50,977	+4.68%
1975	60,225	+3.40%
1980	83,579	+6.77%
1990	123,982	+4.02%
1995	137,081	+1.90%
2000	163,037	+3.79%
2007	196,569	+2.61%
2010	199,154	+0.48%
2015	209,083	+0.93%
2020	225,673	+1.62%
2024	228,023	+0.25%
Source: Philippine Statistics Authority

In the 2020 census, the population of Meycauayan was 225,673 people, with a density of 7,000 inhabitants per square kilometer or 18,000 inhabitants per square mile.

== Government ==
=== Local government ===
The Sangguniang Panlungsod is the legislature of the government of Meycauayan. As defined by the Local Government Code of 1991, the legislature has legislative and quasi-judicial powers and functions. The members of the Sangguniang Panlungsod, often referred to as councilors, are either elected or ex-officio and include a city's vice mayor who serves as the presiding officer.

2025-2028 Meycauayan City Officials
Position	Name	Party
Mayor	Henry R. Villarica	PFP
Vice Mayor	Josefina O. Violago	PFP
Councilors	Henry Lester R. Villarica	PFP
Councilors	Ronald S. Palomares	PFP
Councilors	Christian M. Velasco	PFP
Councilors	Catherine C. Abacan	PFP
Councilors	Raoul M. Atadero	PFP
Councilors	Georgina Marie S. Dulalia	PFP
Councilors	Wilfredo DS. Macatulad	PFP
Councilors	Mary Christine Z. Paguio	PFP
Councilors	Larissa A. San Diego	PFP
Councilors	Danilo B. Abacan Jr	PFP
Ex Officio City Council Members
ABC President	Carlito O. Magno (Tugatog)	Nonpartisan
SK Federation President	Jin Marie Eugenie L. Misuse (Malhacan)	Nonpartisan
Barangay Chairpersons
Bagbaguin	Crispulo D. Rivera	
Bahay Pare	Joel E. Bernardino	
Bancal	Francisco M. Pacheco	
Banga	Mar R. Biunas	
Bayugo	Joey M. Uy	
Calvario	Apolinar S. Del Rosario	
Camalig	Mark Joseph O. Violago	
Hulo	Paul John P. Prudon	
Iba	Agustin O. Seminiano	
Langka	Joselito L. Beniza	
Lawa	Richard A. Dela Cruz	
Libtong	Carlos M. Evangelista	
Liputan	Oliver R. Dumalay	
Longos	Arnel C. Gutierrez	
Malhacan	Delfin B. San Pablo IV	
Pajo	Gilbert P. De Vera	
Pandayan	Arsenio B. Lunaria	
Pantoc	Crisanto Niño D. Caparas	
Perez	Job D. Doroja	
Poblacion	Mary Grace T. Portento	
Saluysoy	Arnaldo R. Velasco	
Saint Francis (Gasak)	Homer J. Evangelista	
Tugatog	Carlito O. Magno	
Ubihan	Niño Joseph P. Villadoz	
Zamora	Bryan M. San Pedro	
Caingin	Melanio D. Alcantara	

=== Past officials ===
List of mayors of Meycauayan
No.	Presidente Municipal	Took office	Left office
1	Tomas Testa	1902	1903
2	Aquedo Noriega	1903	1905
3	Dalmacio Ferrer	1906	1907
4	Aquedo Noriega	1907	1909
5	Cedistino Juson	1910	1916
6	Liberato Exaltacion	1917	1921
7	Jose Peñas	1921	1922
8	Hermogenes Lim	1922	1925
9	Maximo Albaño	1925	1928
10	Moises Buñing	1928	1931
11	Hermogenes Lim	1931	1934
12	Perfecto Reyes Lim	1934	1937
No.	Alcalde	Took office	Left office
1	Enrique Legaspi	1938	1942
2	Dr. Restituto Calaguas	1942	1945
3	Patricio Alcaraz	1945	1945
4	Marcelo Lucero	1945	1945
5	Jacinto Legaspi	1945	1945
No.	Municipal Mayors	Took office	Left office
1	Dr. Lope Daez	1946	1951
2	Dr. Lope Daez	1956	1959
3	Pedro Carreon	1960	1963
4	Celso Legaspi	1964	1978
5	Jose Catajan	1980	1982
6	Adriano Daez	1982	1986
7	Ernesto Cabigas	1986	1987
8	Oscar Legaspi	1987	1987
9	Rolando Liwanag	1987	1988
10	Florentino Blanco	1988	1992
11	Edgardo Nolasco	1995	1998
12	Eduardo Alarilla	1998	2006
No.	City Mayors	Took office	Left office
1	Eduardo Alarilla	2006	2007
2	Joan Alarilla	2007	2016
3	Henry Villarica	2016	2019
4	Linabelle Villarica	2019	2022
3	Henry Villarica	2022	incumbent

== Economy ==
Poverty incidence of Meycauayan

Source: Philippine Statistics Authority

The City of Meycauayan is the economic, industrial, commercial, financial and educational center of southern Bulacan. The city is known for its jewelry and leather industries. For years, Meycauayan has been the hub of jewelry production in the Philippines and in Asia. It is known for its low-priced jewelry. The locality also produces leather goods. Shoes, bags, and leather products of every kind have traditionally been manufactured here. A number of leather tanneries still operate in Meycauayan, which over the years have converted the city into a hub for leather goods.

In 2016, the total net income for Meycauayan was worth ₱6.875 billion, making it the richest in the province of Bulacan and 18th-highest-income city in the Philippines.

=== Industrial compounds and parks ===
The City of Meycauayan is also home to many industrial parks and compounds.

- Meycauayan Industrial Subd. I, II, III & IV
- Meridian Industrial Compound
- Muralla Industrial Park
- First Valenzuela Industrial Compound
- Sterling Industrial Park Phase I, II, III & IV

== Education ==
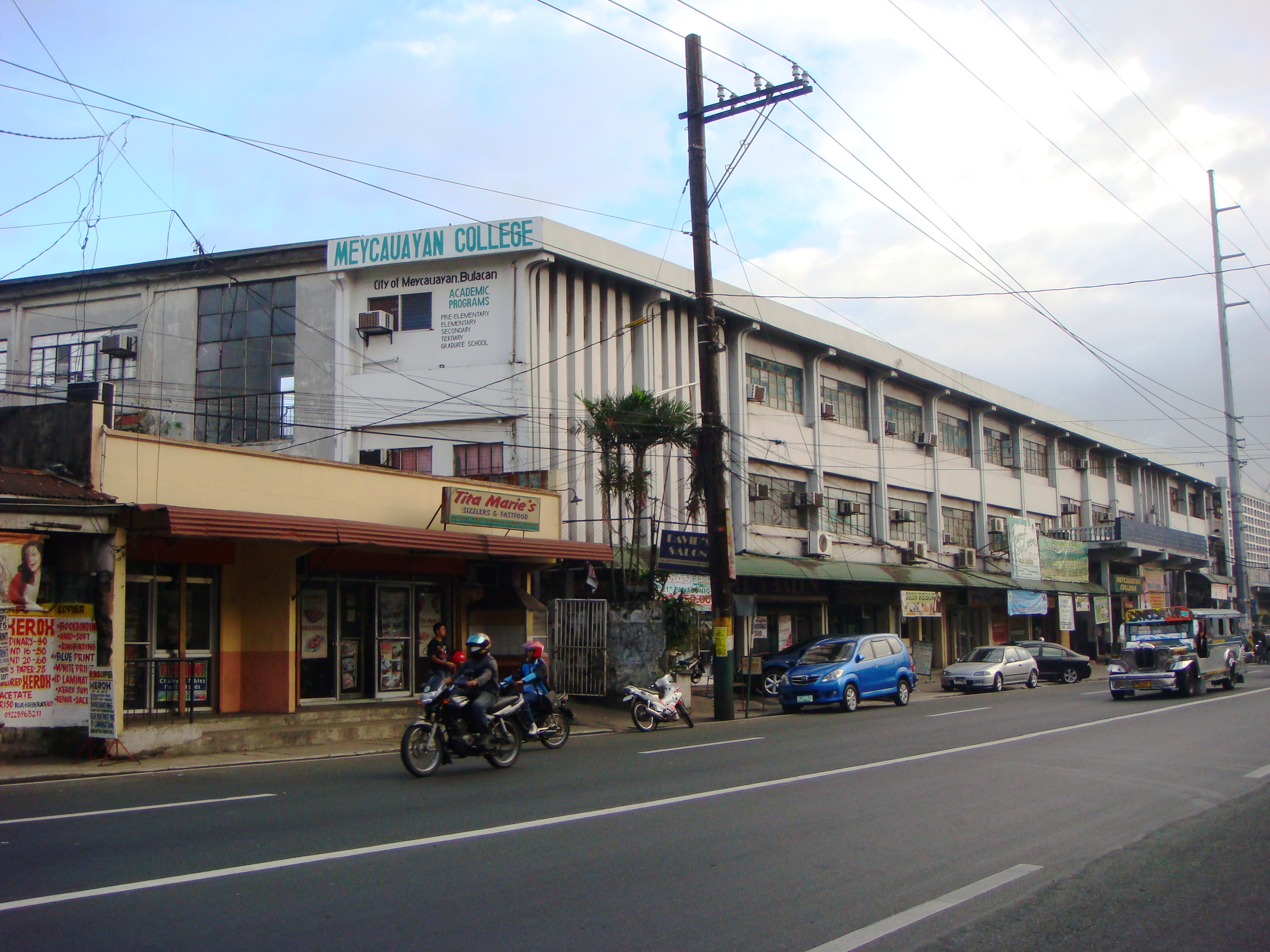
Meycauayan College building

Meycauayan City has its own division of schools since January 2013. The City Schools Division of Meycauayan has two districts, Meycauayan West District and Meycauayan East District.

There are 24 public elementary schools and 4 public high schools as well as 11 private schools in the city.

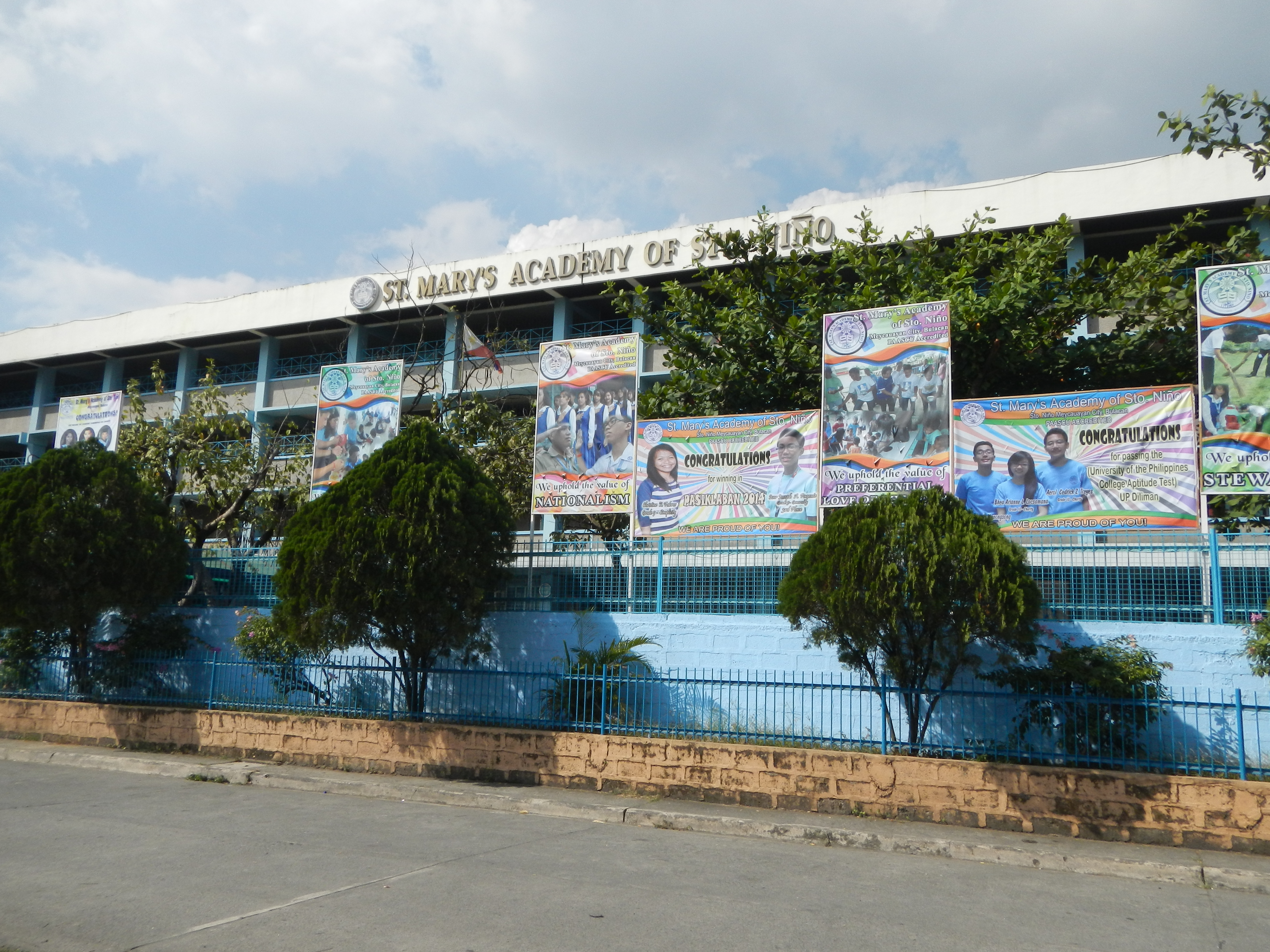
Facade of St. Mary's Academy of Santo Niñomy

St. Mary's Academy of Sto. Niño is the first Catholic school built in the fast-growing Las Villas de Sto. Nino Subdivision of Meycauayan City. In September 1983, the developer of the subdivision, Geronima Que, invited Sister Maria Virginia Banez, RVM, to build a school in the heart of Las Villas de Sto. Niño. In October 1983, the Ministry of Education, Culture and Sports (MECS) erected a school on the hectare of land donated by Que, along with the RVM congregation's purchase of another one and a half hectares to give more space for expansion. It has been expanded and renovated several times since.

There are also tertiary schools in Meycauayan.

Polytechnic College of the City of Meycauayan is under the funding and management of the City Government, currently located at Pag-asa Street, Barangay Malhacan. Meycauayan College is a private educational institution in Barangay Calvario and Malhacan. It was established in 1925 as Meycauayan Institute.

== Religion ==
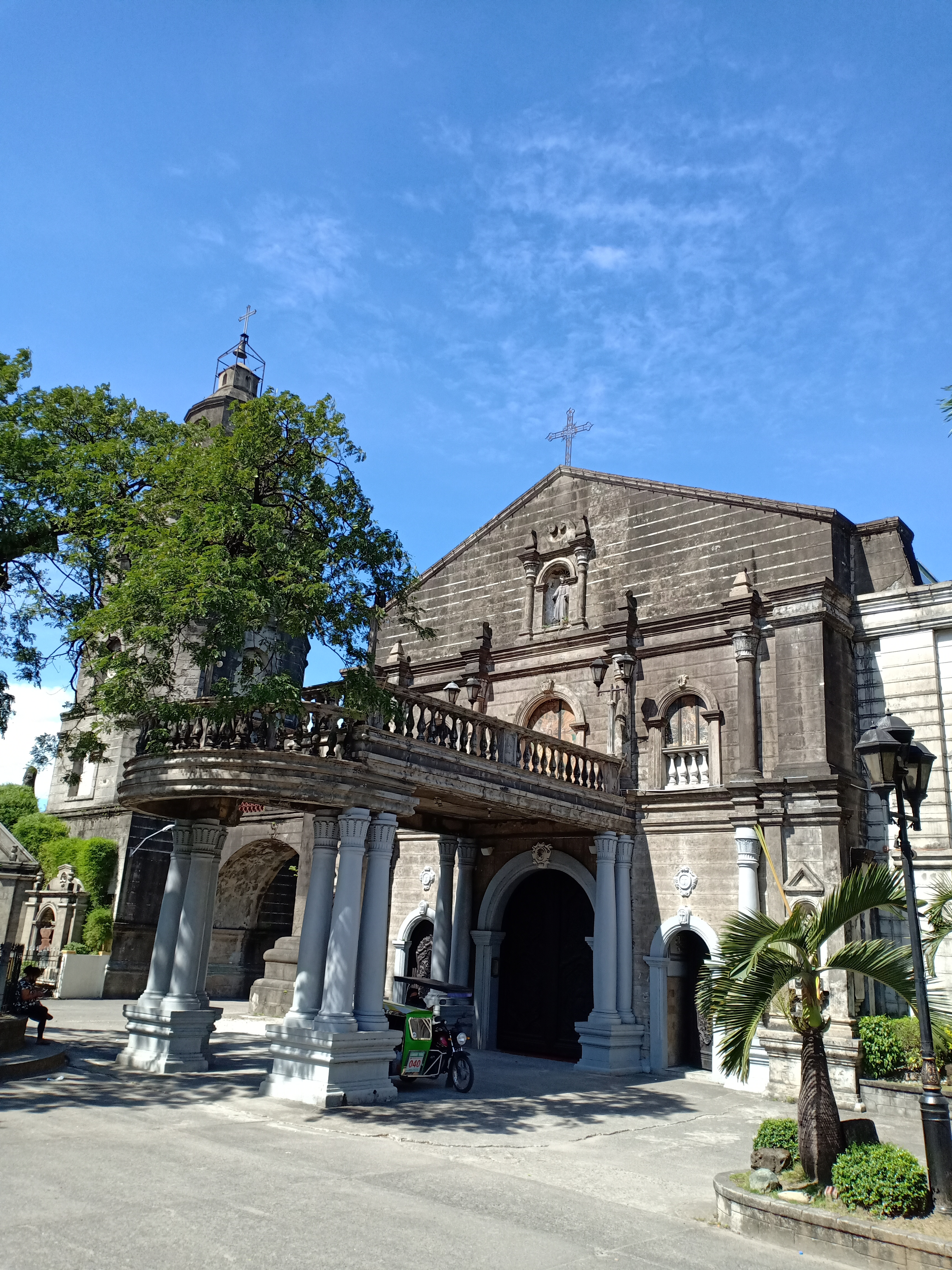
Meycauayan Church, also known as St. Francis of Assisi Parish Church

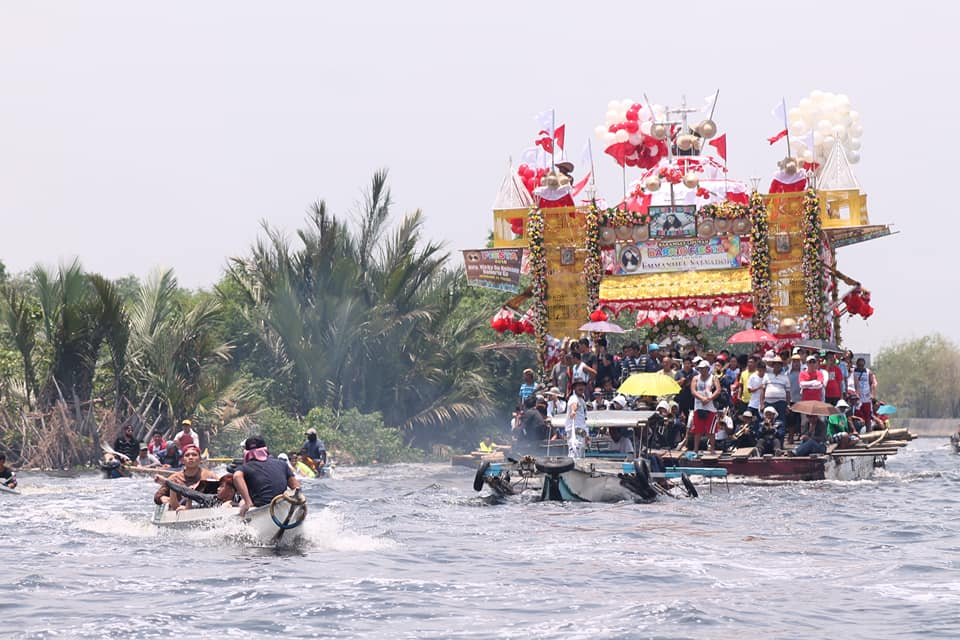
Decorated fluvial float (pagoda) carrying the image of the Mahal na Señor of Liputan, Meycauayan City on its feast day every May.

Saint Francis of Assisi Parish Church, commonly known as the Meycauayan Church, is a Roman Catholic church located in Meycauayan, Philippines. It is one of the oldest parishes in Bulacan, which even predates the Malolos Cathedral established in 1580 and the Barasoain Church established in 1859. It is also the province's largest parish with an estimated population of about 80,000 parishioners. The church is the seat of the vicariate of St. Francis of Assisi in the Diocese of Malolos.

=== Feasts ===
Liputan Barrio Fiesta

This festival takes place every 2nd Sunday of May in Barangay Liputan. After a nine-day novena, the fiesta culminates with a colorful fluvial procession in honor of the "Mahal na Señor", an image of the Crucified Christ venerated on the island of Liputan. The image, along with those of the Virgin and St. Joseph, are placed on a pagoda, a makeshift bamboo bier constructed on boats and decorated with buntings. The images are then taken to the old church in the town center of Meycauayan for a mass.

Feast of St. Francis of Assisi

It is a celebration held in the oldest church in Meycauayan, the St. Francis of Assisi Parish Church in Barangay Poblacion, which commemorates the foundation of the city in 1578 by the Franciscans. Before, it has come to be known as the "Kawayanan Festival", and includes an animal parade, street dancing, and other related cultural activities. It is held every fourth of October.

=== Religious organizations/denominations ===
Like other cities and municipalities in the Philippines, Meycauayan hosts no official religion as the 1987 Constitution mandates that there shall be no state religion and that it provides for the separation of church and state.

Church buildings and related structures from various sects and denominations are scattered in Meycauayan. They come mostly from Christians with their religious denominations and orders like the Catholic Church, the Born-again, the Baptists, the Jehovah's Witnesses and the Iglesia ni Cristo, while the city also has mosques and centers for Islam.

There are Light Church Meycauayan and Jesus Is Lord Church Meycauayan Chapter as well.

== Environment ==
In 2007, Meycauayan and the neighboring town of Marilao in Bulacan were included in the list of the world's 30 most polluted places in the developing world drawn up by the private New York-based institute Pure Earth. In its report, "The World’s Worst Polluted Places" for 2007, Pure Earth said: "Industrial waste is haphazardly dumped into the Meycauayan, Marilao and Obando River system, a source of drinking and agricultural water supplies for the 250,000 people living in and around" the Meycauayan-Marilao area.

== Gallery ==
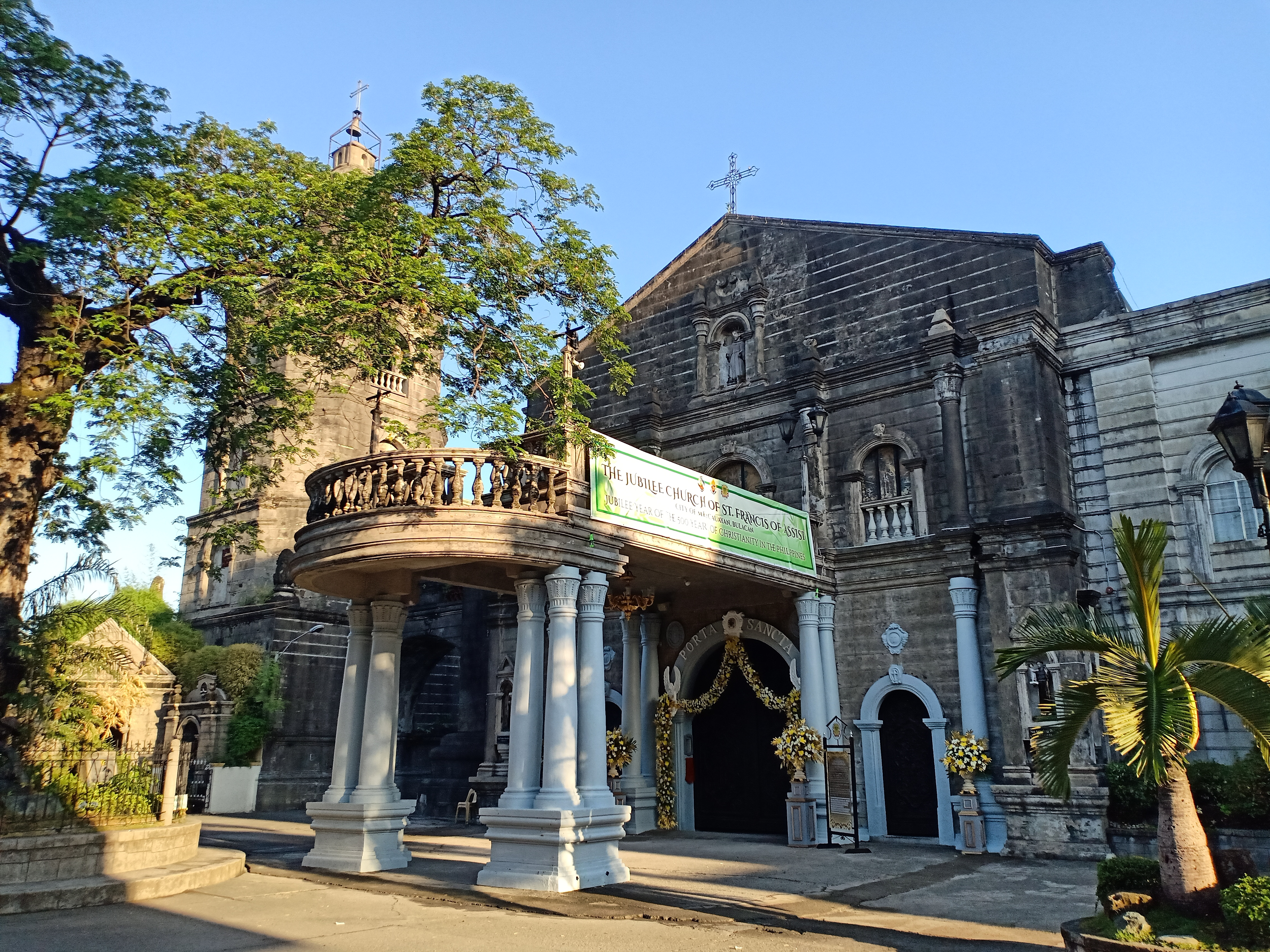
The Parish Church of St. Francis of Assisi

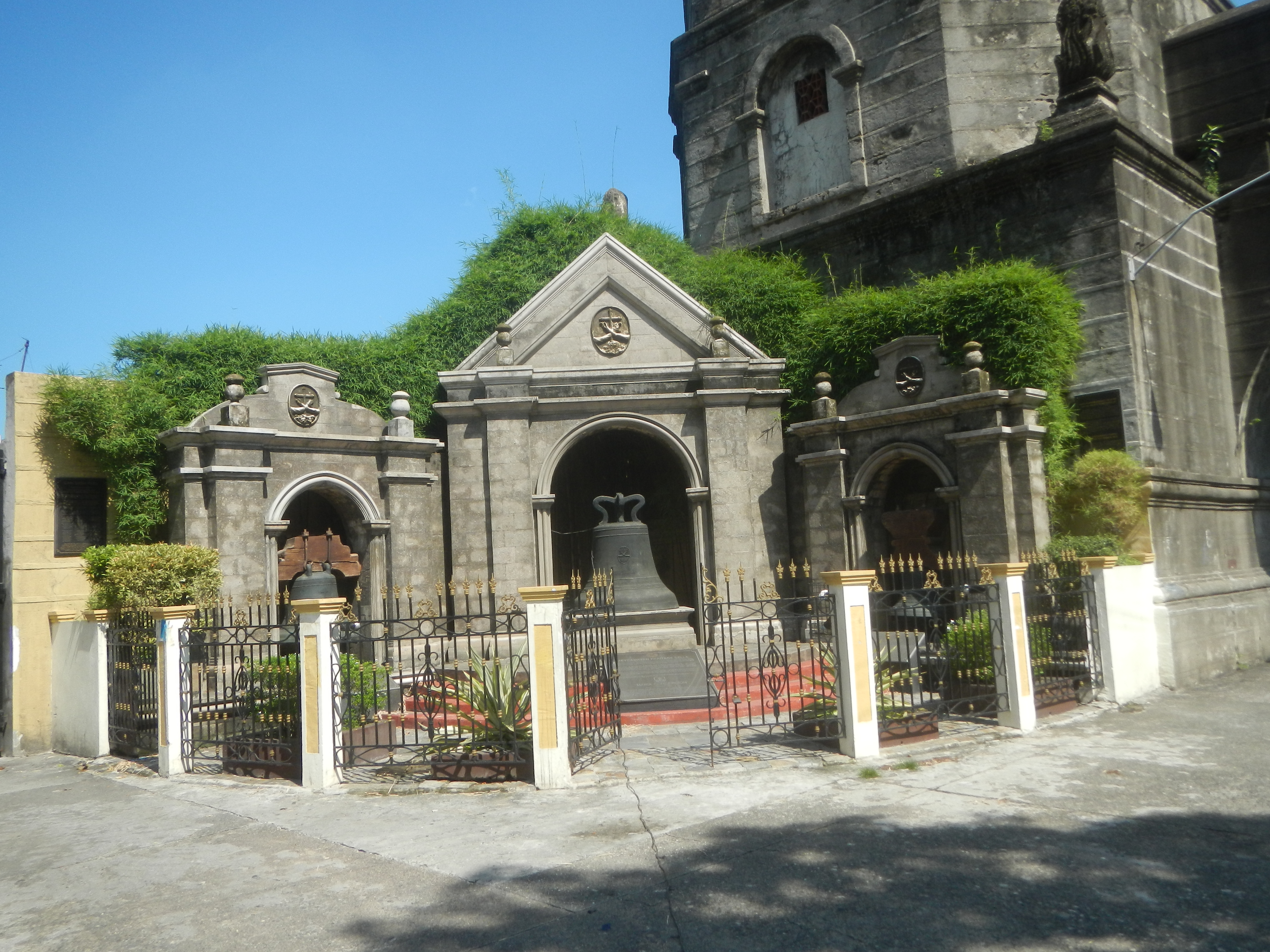
Meycauayan Heritage Bells

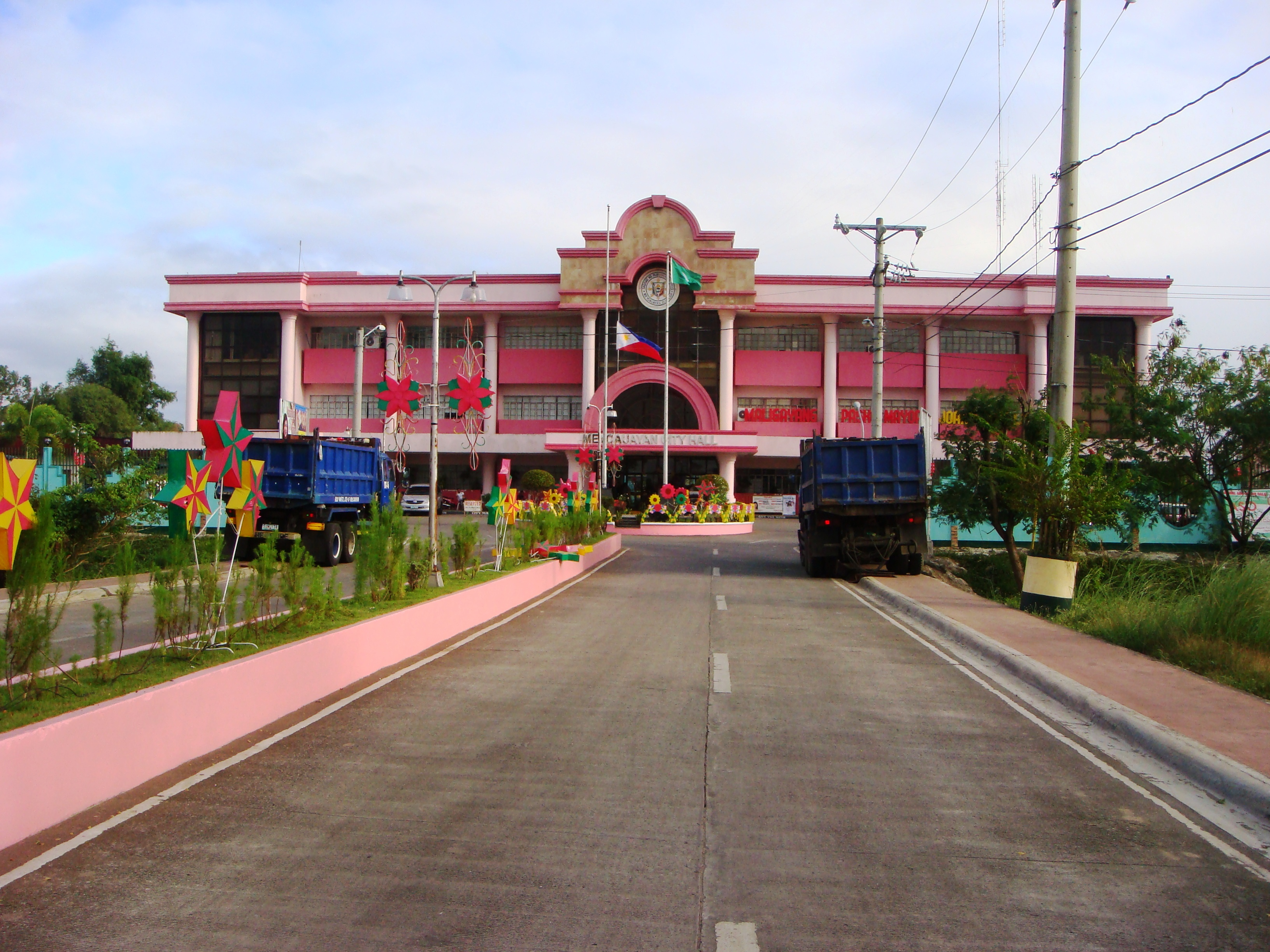
2005 Meycauayan City Hall (Camalig)

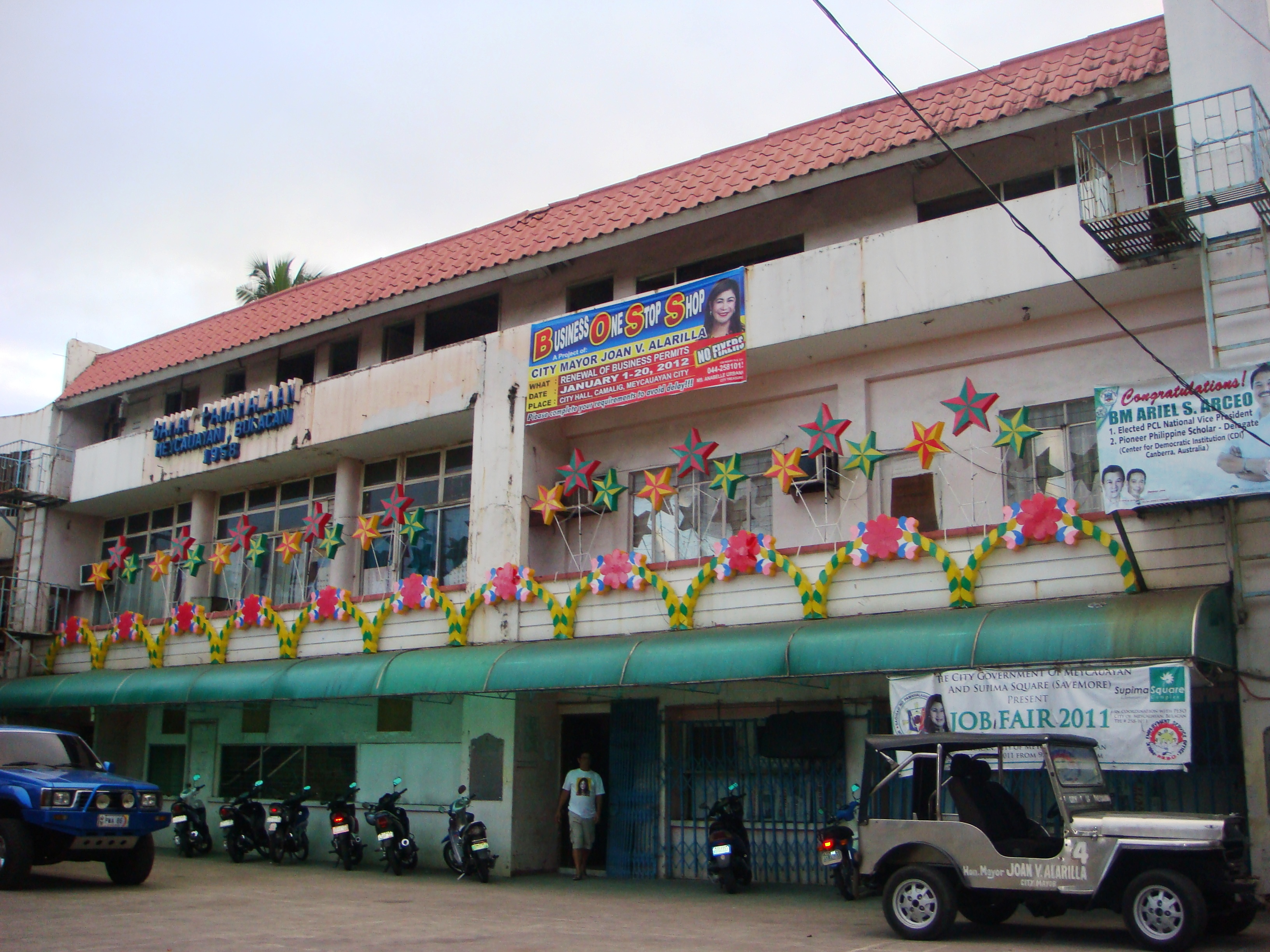
Old Municipal Hall in Poblacion (later demolished and replaced by Meycauayan Convention Center)

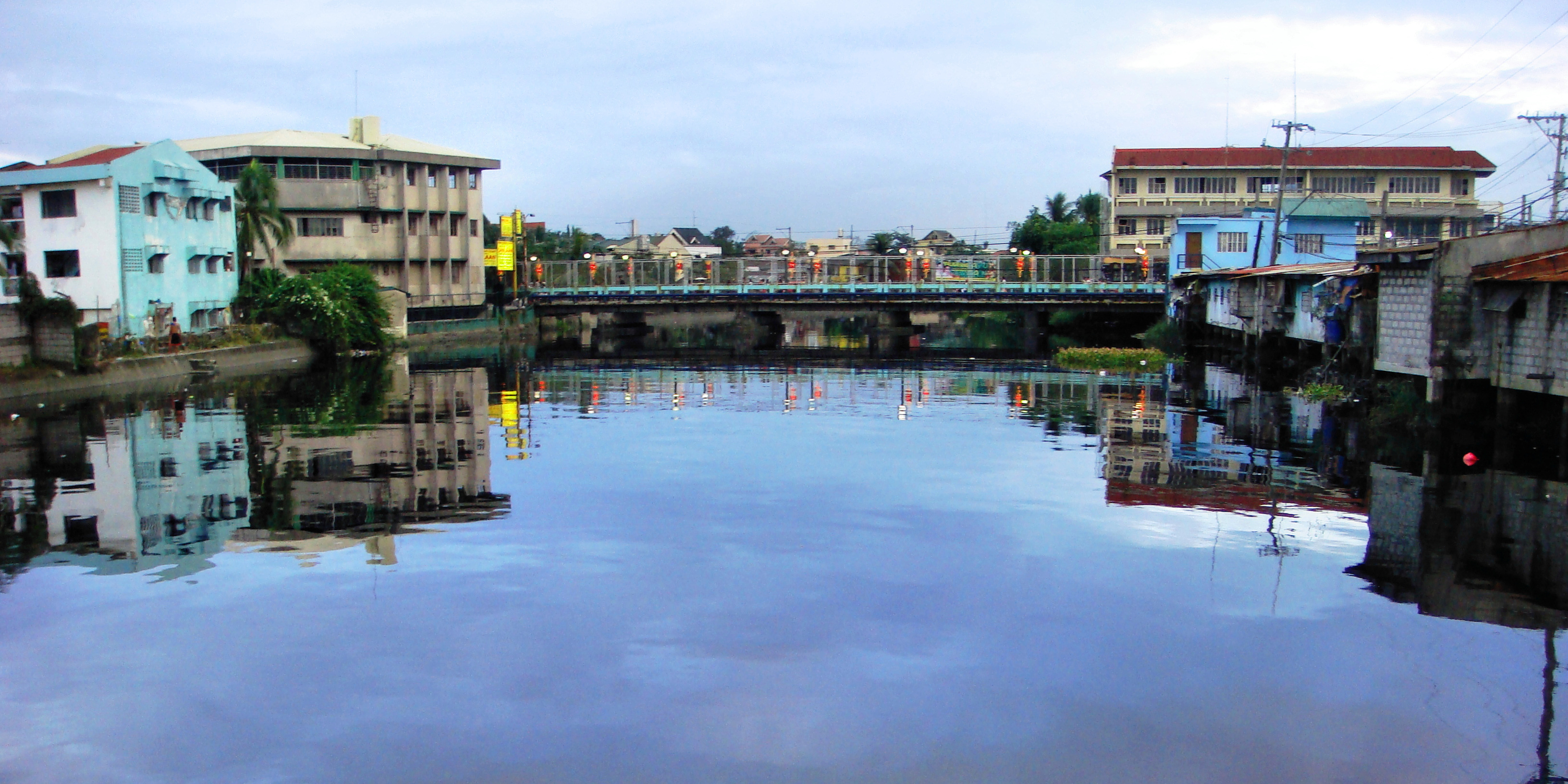
Meycauayan River

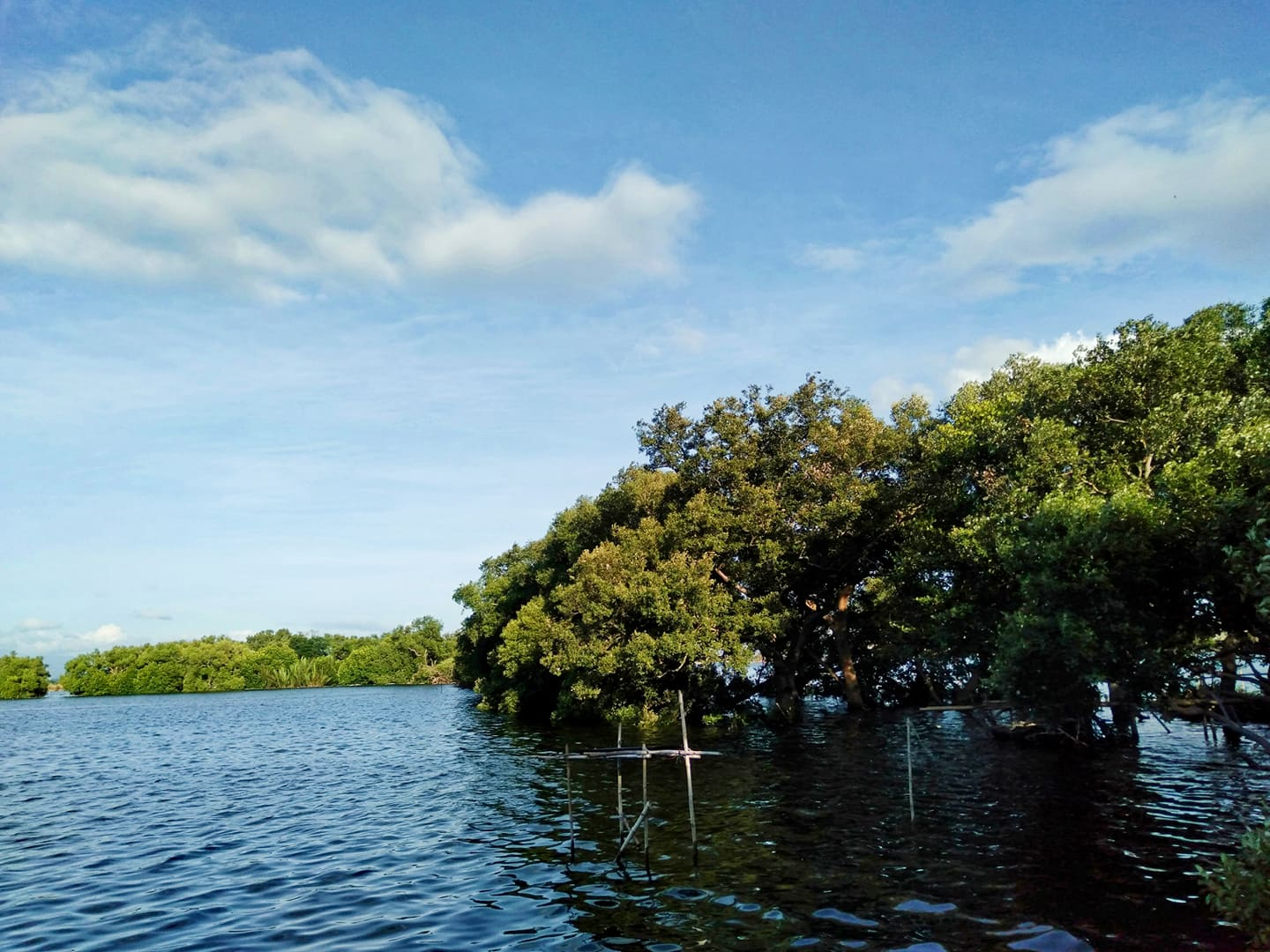
Mangroves in Barangay Ubihan

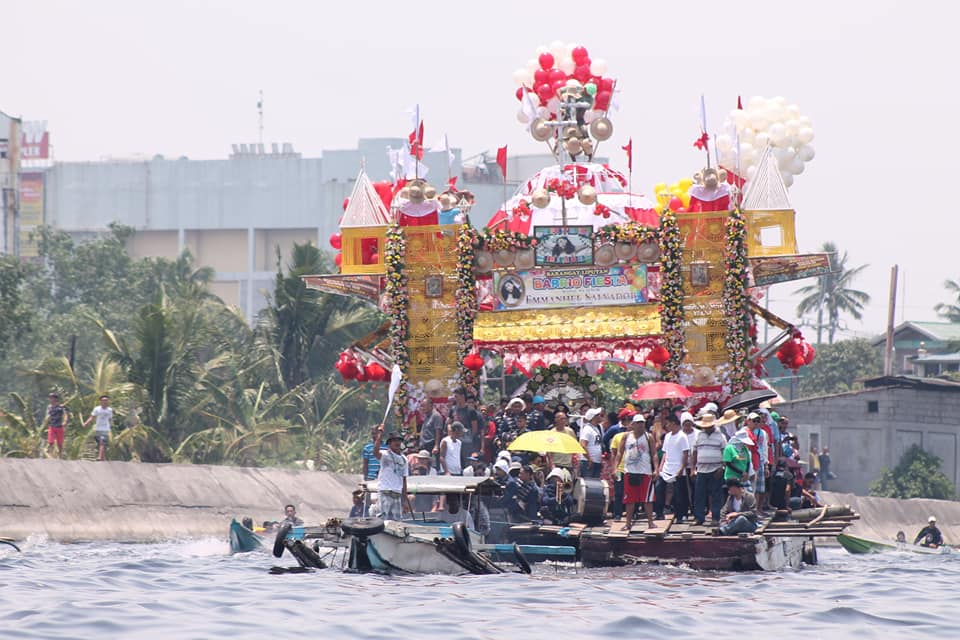
Pagoda ng Mahal na Señor ng Liputan

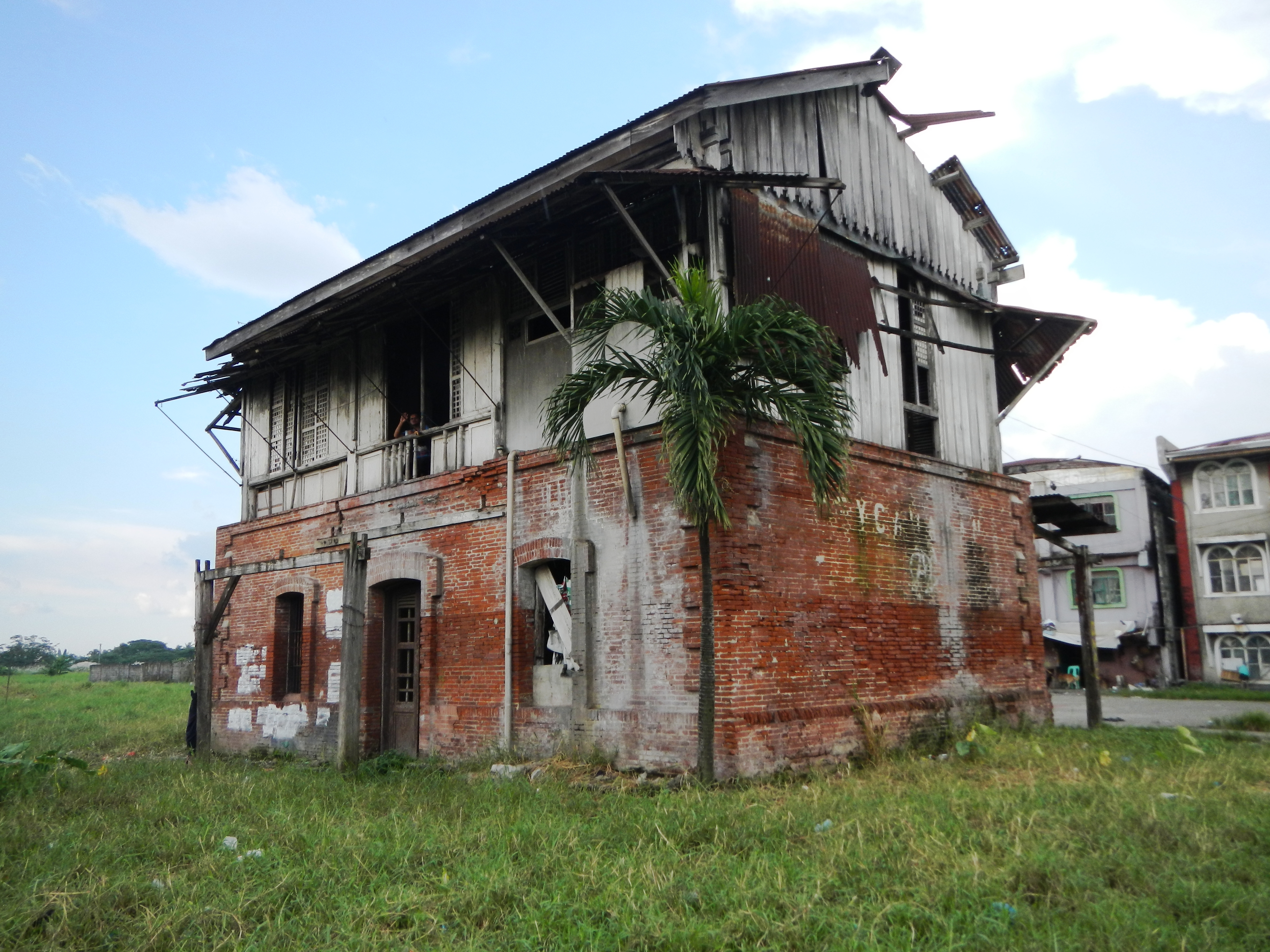
Old Meycauayan Train Station

== Notable people ==
- Lydia de Vega – track and field athlete, Asian Games medalist
- Rans Rifol – actress, former member of MNL48
- Antonio Z. Atienza Jr. — jeweler
- Roel Cortez – singer, songwriter
- Chelsea Manalo – beauty pageant titleholder, Miss Universe Philippines 2024
- Rey Valera – singer, songwriter
- Euwenn Mikaell - child actor
- Ina Raymundo - actress
