= 2019 Santa Maria, Bulacan, local elections =

Philippine election

2019 Santa Maria, Bulacan local elections
← 2016	May 13, 2019	2022 →
Nominee	Yoyoy Pleyto	Omeng Ramos	Jesus Mateo
Party	PDP–Laban	NUP	PFP
Running mate	Ricky Buenaventura	Nelson Luciano	N/A
Popular vote	41,872	38,812	19,305
Percentage	41.87	38.81	19.30
Mayor before election
Yoyoy Pleyto
NPC
Elected mayor
Yoyoy Pleyto
PDP–Laban

Local elections will be held in Santa Maria, Bulacan on May 13, 2019 within the Philippine general election in 2019 Bulacan local elections. The voters will elect for the elective local posts in the municipality: the mayor, vice mayor, and eight councilors.

== Mayoralty Election ==
List of certified candidates running for seats in Santa Maria.

=== Mayor ===
Incumbent mayor Russel Pleyto is running for his 2nd term, his opponents are former mayors Bartolome Ramos and Ato Mateo.

Santa Maria, Bulacan mayoral election
Party	Candidate	Votes	%
PDP–Laban	Yoyoy Pleyto	41,872	41.87
NUP	Omeng Ramos	38,812	38.81
PFP	Jesus Mateo	19,305	19.30
Total votes		99,989	100.00

=== Vice Mayor ===
Incumbent vice mayor Ricky Buenaventura is running for his 2nd term, his opponent is incumbent councilor Nelson Luciano.

Santa Maria, Bulacan Vice mayoral election
Party	Candidate	Votes	%
PDP–Laban	Ricky Buenaventura	55,944	59.15
NUP	Nelson Luciano	38,623	40.84
Total votes		94,567	100.00

=== Sangguniang Bayan election ===
Election is via plurality-at-large voting: A voter votes for up to eight candidates, then the eight candidates with the highest number of votes are elected.

Councilors Nelson Luciano, Oscar Morales and Obet Perez are term-limited, while incumbent Froilan Caguiat is term-limited and running for Board Member in the Fourth district. Councilors Rogelio Barcial, Jun Mateo and Marissa Tuazon will run for their second terms, while Jay de Guzman, will run for his third and final term.

Santa Maria, Bulacan Sangguniang Bayan election
Party	Candidate	Votes	%
PDP–Laban	Reymalyn Castro	61,406	9.25
Independent	Kaye Martinez	55,537	8.36
PDP–Laban	Marisa Tuazon	50,312	7.58
NUP	Rico Sto. Domingo	47,940	7.22
PDP–Laban	Jay de Guzman	43,828	6.60
PDP–Laban	Jun Mateo	39,063	5.88
NUP	Fe Ramos	38,010	5.72
PDP–Laban	Chito Villacorte	35,348	5.32
PDP–Laban	Oje Morales	34,557	5.20
NUP	Lito Jacinto	30,758	4.63
NUP	Ansing Santos	29,598	4.45
PDP–Laban	RGB Barcial	29,250	4.40
PDP–Laban	Jojo del Rosario	29,120	4.38
NUP	Elmer Clemente	27,398	4.12
NUP	Sir Mel Manuel	23,815	3.58
NUP	Jimmy Enriquez	21,915	3.30
NUP	Boots Nicolas	18,246	2.74
Independent	Pastor Jun del Rosario	15,802	2.38
Independent	Mary Jane Garcia	15,311	2.30
LM	Jelo Lopez	7,712	1.16
LM	Cesar Nepomuceno	4,726	0.71
Independent	Arnel Villar	4,006	0.60
Total votes		663,658	100.00
