= Fortunato Halili =

Filipino politician and businessman

Governor of Bulacan
- In office 1946–1951
- President: Manuel Roxas; Elpidio Quirino

Personal details
- Born: Fortunato F. Halili Santa Maria, Bulacan, Philippines
- Occupation: Politician, businessman

Fortunato Flores Halili (February 28, 1898 Santa Maria, Bulacan - December 29, 1966) was a Filipino politician and business magnate who served as the Governor of the province of Bulacan in the Philippines from 1943 to 1944 and from 1946 to 1951. Prior to his political career and throughout the mid-20th century, Halili founded and managed F.F. Halili Enterprises, a massive conglomerate known for operating Halili Transit and manufacturing Halili Beer.

== Business career ==
Halili established F.F. Halili Enterprises, which grew into a prominent industrial empire in the Philippines following World War II.

=== Halili Transit ===
He operated Halili Transit, one of the largest and most ubiquitous bus operators in the country during the mid-20th century. The transportation company maintained extensive routes connecting Manila to various northern provincial destinations, including Bulacan, making it a critical asset in post-war public transport.

=== Halili Brewery ===
In addition to public transportation, Halili ventured into the beverage and brewing industry. He established a large brewery along Balintawak in Quezon City. Through a franchise agreement with the Mission Dry Corporation ("California Crushed Fruit Corporation") in Los Angeles, his company was initially given the exclusive right to bottle and distribute Mission beverages in the Philippines.

The brewery's most famous proprietary product was Halili Beer, which became a formidable competitor to the leading brands in the local market during the 1960s. The brewery also produced Goody Rootbeer. Production eventually ceased largely due to Halili's declining health, he was reportedly afflicted with infantile paralysis, which left the company without firm leadership and led to the closure of the brand. Today, surviving first-generation Halili Beer bottles are considered rare and highly valued historical artifacts among Filipino antique collectors.

== Political career ==
Following the end of World War II, Halili was appointed Governor of Bulacan in 1946 when Manuel Roxas assumed the presidency. Two years later, he won the gubernatorial election and served a full term until 1951.

His administration was heavily focused on the post-war rehabilitation and infrastructure development of the province. During his tenure, the Bulacan Provincial Capitol was fully rehabilitated at the cost of ₱121,800.00. He oversaw the extensive repair of the province's road network, including 29 kilometers of the Valenzuela-Malolos road and 13 kilometers connecting Apalit and Malolos. Multiple bridges were also constructed in Calumpit, Plaridel, Meycauayan, Bocaue, and his hometown of Santa Maria.

In the sector of public health and utilities, Governor Halili spearheaded the repair of the Bulacan Provincial Hospital's administration building, funded the San Miguel Emergency Hospital, and improved the waterworks systems across various municipalities including Hagonoy, Paombong, Malolos, and Obando. He also heavily invested in education by establishing two new public schools in San Miguel and Santa Maria, rehabilitating several elementary schools in Norzagaray, San Jose, and Obando, and establishing the Bulacan branch library.

== Legacy ==
Several infrastructure projects and educational institutions in Bulacan were named in honor of his contributions to the province:

- Governor Fortunato F. Halili Avenue: An 18.1-kilometer (11.2 mi) national highway that serves as a major thoroughfare traversing the municipalities of Bocaue and Santa Maria, extending up to the city of San Jose del Monte.
- Fortunato F. Halili National Agricultural School: A public agricultural institution located in Barangay Guyong, Santa Maria. It was officially renamed from the Philippine National Agricultural School on March 31, 1992, through Republic Act No. 7331, to honor the former governor.
