= Bagbaguin =

Bagbaguin may refer to:

- Barangay Bagbaguin, Santa Maria, Bulacan, Philippines
- Barangay Bagbaguin in Valenzuela City, Metro Manila, Philippines
