= Geography of Santa Maria, Bulacan =

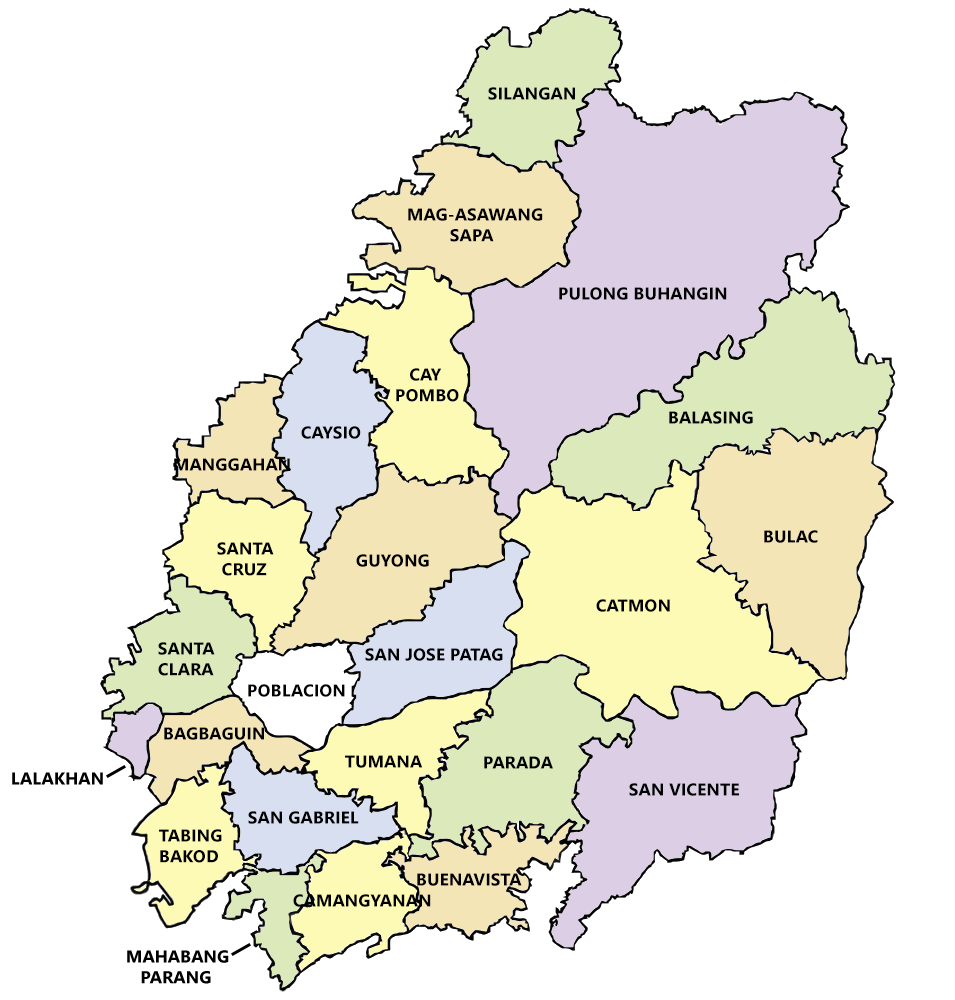
Barangay map of Santa Maria

Santa Maria is a landlocked municipality in the province of Bulacan, Philippines comprising 24 barangays with a total land area of 90.925 square kilometers (35.106 sq mi).

The geographic location of Santa Maria may be regarded favorable with respect to its relative distance from the National Capital Region (NCR) and the Provincial Capitol. Lying at the eastern portion of Bulacan, which is just 32 kilometers away from Manila. In terms of location relative to its neighboring towns, Santa Maria is bounded on the north by the municipalities of Angat and Pandi; portion of San Jose del Monte City on the south; Norzagaray and other portions of San Jose del Monte City on the east; and municipalities of Marilao and Bocaue on the western side.

== Topography ==
The topography of Santa Maria is generally flat, however, it is hilly towards the north. This area covers the barangays of Silangan, Mag-asawang Sapa, Pulong Buhangin and some parts of Balasing with landscape ranging from 8 to 18 percent slope. The rest of the barangays have a slope range from level to undulating.

Network of small rivers can be found all throughout the municipal territory. Flowing downstream from the north, these tributaries converge into the Santa Maria River. This river plays a vital role in the physical configuration of Santa Maria and adjacent towns of Norzagaray and San Jose del Monte City as it drains water from these areas.

== Climate ==
Santa Maria, Bulacan

Climate chart (precipitation, max. and min. temperature)
J	F	M	A	M	J	J	A	S	O	N	D
17 29 20	7 31 19	5 32 21	24 34 22	153 34 23	355 31 23	504 30 23	516 30 23	374 30 23	225 30 22	163 30 21	68 29 20
- █ Average max. and min. temperatures in °C
- █ Precipitation totals in mm
- Source: Weathrebase
Imperial conversion
J	F	M	A	M	J	J	A	S	O	N	D
0.7 84 68	0.3 88 66	0.2 90 70	0.9 93 72	6 93 73	14 88 73	20 86 73	20 86 73	15 86 73	8.9 86 72	6.4 86 70	2.7 84 68
- █ Average max. and min. temperatures in °F
- █ Precipitation totals in inches

Santa Maria has a climate “first type” which is defined as having two pronounced seasons: Dry from November to April and wet during the rest of the year. During the dry months, precipitation is less because of the prevailing easterly wind blow to produce rainfall in its leeward side.

The Köppen climate system classifies Santa Maria climate as tropical monsoon (Am) due to its location and precipitation characteristics. This means that the municipality has two pronounced seasons: dry and wet seasons.

Santa Maria's most perceptible months start from May and may have its maximum in August, which gradually decreases until December. During these most months, thunderstorms and rain showers causes precipitation in May and June while the rest is primarily due to the southeast monsoon that prevails on this particular part of the year. Others which occur in November and December are caused by tropical cyclones that pass through the area.

=== Temperature ===
The annual mean temperature in the area is 27.7 °C (81.9 °F). The warmest month is May with mean temperature of 29 °C (84 °F) while the coldest is January at 25.2 °C (77.4 °F).

=== Relative humidity ===
The mean annual relative humidity in the area is 77%, which is under a normal condition. The mean monthly relative humidity is lowest in March at 64% and highest in September at 84%.

== Ground water ==
The source of potable water of Santa Maria is purely dependent from its aquifer underneath it. Although the town is not rich in surface water, its ground water resources has sufficiently provide Santa Maria with their present requirement. Ground water in Santa Maria is essentially under shallow well areas, which means that fresh water can be easily found at a depth of about 20 meters below the ground surface. However, at present, potable water is sourced at 100 meters above. On the contrary, this finite resource has been badly contaminated by infiltration of sewage in some shallow wells at barangays San Jose Patag, Catmon, Pulong Buhangin, Santa Clara and Bagbaguin.

== Soil ==
=== Soil suitability ===
The soils in Santa Maria is classified under three (3) categories namely soils of the Alluvial Landscape, soils of the Piedmont Landscape and soils of the Hilly Landscape.

==== Alluvial landscape ====
Soils range from clayey to fine clayey somewhat poorly to poorly drained deep soils. These soils are principally grown to paddy rice and can be used for fishpond during rainy season. This landscape is composed of two (2) minor landform units as follows:

1. River terraces and levees – Narrow river terraces are topographic surfaces, which mark former valley floor levels and resulting from seasonal stream. The levels are elevated landforms slightly above the narrow river terraces. Some areas are subject to slight to moderate seasonal flooding in some years.

2. Low Alluvial terraces and depressions – It consists of the slightly dissected broad low alluvial terraces depressions and narrow alluvial valleys.

Moreover, soil series of the Alluvial Landscape consists of the Batia and Tagulod Series. Both series has low to adequate organic matter content and inherent fertility. However, Batia Series can be found on a relative steeper slopes covering the barangays of Lalakhan, Bagbaguin and Santa Clara. Tagulod Series on the other hand, covers the barangays of Manggahan, Caysio, Caypombo, Camangyanan, Tumana and Parada which is regarded to be generally utilized under rice production during wet season.

==== Piedmont landscape ====
It consists of gently undulating to rolling tuffaceous and sedimentary foot slopes slightly above and adjacent to the plain and free from local flooding hazard. This landscape, however, is composed of two soils series namely the Pulong Buhangin Series and Maysan Series. Pulong Buhangin Series has deficient organic matter content and high to moderate inherent fertility. This is principally utilized for paddy rice and built-up areas. Non-irrigated paddy rice constitutes the principal crop during wet season. These soils are left fallowed during dry season due to lack of irrigation and rainfall. These areas can be found in the central to upper portion of Santa Maria. Meanwhile, the Maysan series consists of very gently sloping to gently undulating shallow moderately drained soils that is formed on degraded tuffaceous sandstone footslopes. This series is mainly utilized for paddy ricefields during wet season and generally left idle during dry season

==== Hilly landscape ====
These soils are primarily in rolling sedimentary hills. The drainage is good with low to medium natural fertility. These areas can be found at barangays Pulong Buhangin, Mag-asawang Sapa, Balasing, Bulac, San Vicente and Guyong. These soils are primarily under pasture grass. Some cultivated areas are grown to diversified cropping.

== Soil fertility ==
=== Soil pH ===
Soil pH measures the level of acidity of the soil – the lower the pH, the more acidic the soil. Most parts of Santa Maria are medium acidic ranging from 5.6 to 6.0 pH. Includes the barangays of Silangan, Mag-asawang Sapa, Caypombo, Caysio, Manggahan, Santa Cruz, Poblacion, Guyong, Balasing, Bulac, Catmon, San Gabriel, San Vicente, Camangyanan and Buenavista. The barangays of Pulong Buhangin, Santa Clara, Lalakhan, Tumana and Parada are strongly acidic ranging 5.1 to 5.5 pH and slightly acidic for the barangay of San Jose Patag ranging from 6.1 to 6.5 pH.

=== Available phosphorus ===
Most parts of Santa Maria are low in phosphorus ranging from 0 ppm to 9 ppm. It includes the barangays of Silangan, Mag-asawang Sapa, Caypombo, Caysio, Manggahan, Santa Cruz, Santa Clara, Lalakhan, Poblacion, Guyong, Balasing, Bulac, San Jose Patag, Tumana, San Gabriel, Parada and San Vicente. Other barangays such as Pulong Buhangin, Camangyanan and Buenavista are medium in phosphorus ranging from 9.0 ppm to 20.0 ppm.

=== Available potassium ===
Most parts of Santa Maria are sufficient in Potassium ranging from 100 ppm and above. It includes the barangays of Mag-asawang Sapa, Santa Clara, Poblacion, Guyong, Balasing, Bulac, San Jose Patag, Parada, San Vicente, Camangyanan and Buenavista. However, Silangan, Caypombo, Caysio, Manggahan, Santa Cruz, Tumana, San Gabriel and Pulong Buhangin are deficient in Potassium ranging from 0 ppm to 100 ppm.

== Geology ==
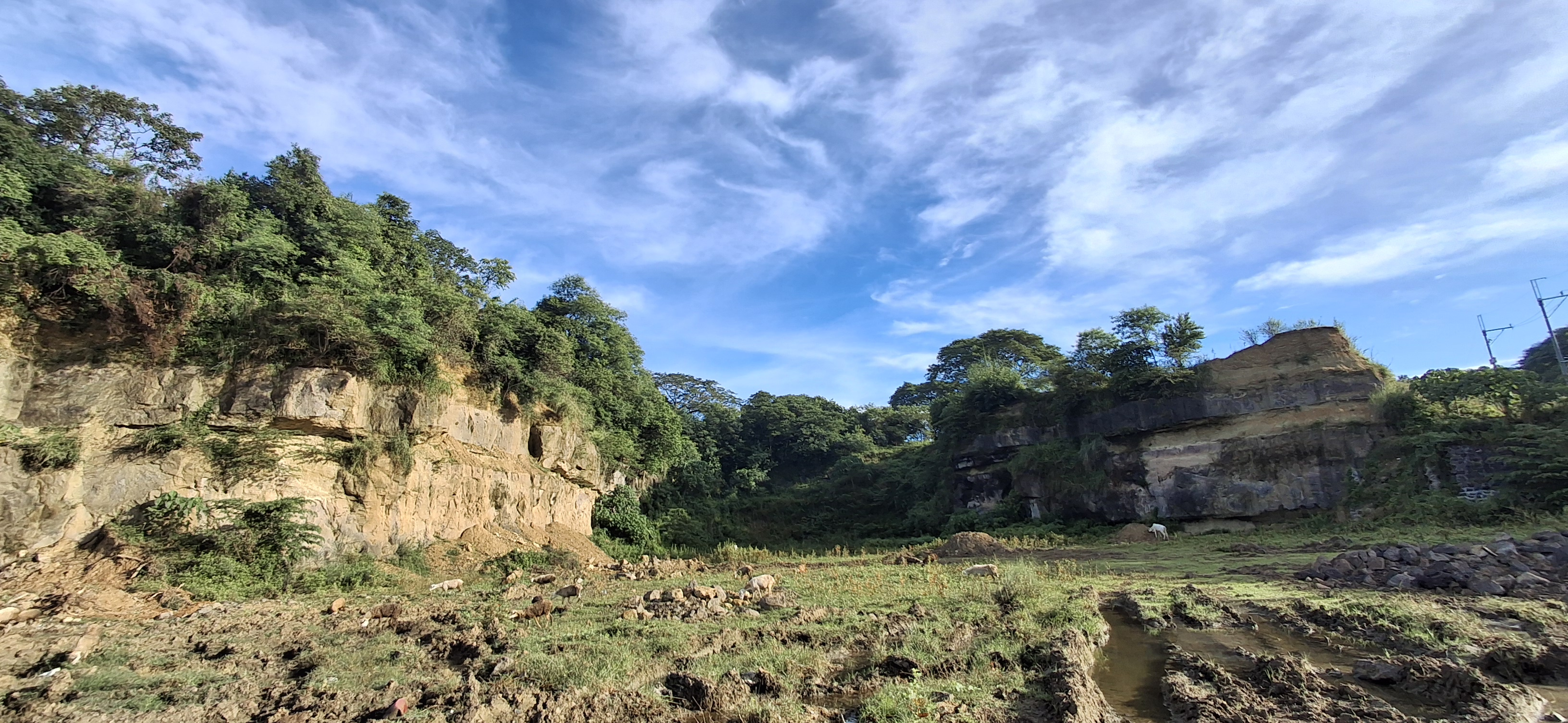
The rocky outcrop of the Guadalupe formation exposed in a quarry at Tibagan, Caypombo, Santa Maria, Bulacan

Guadalupe Formation is the major underlying geological structure present in the territory of the municipality of Santa Maria.This is made up of two formations namely Alat Conglomerate and Diliman Tuff. Alat Conglomerate is characterized by its consolidated pebbles, gravel or boulder beds composition. While Diliman Tuff is generally made up of an almost flat-lying sequence of vitric tuffs and welded volcanic breccias with subordinate amounts of tuffaceous, fine- to medium-grained sandstone. It also underlies areas between Sta. Maria and Bulu rivers in Bulacan. Based on this makeup, the whole area of Santa Maria is regarded to be very suitable to hold structures necessary for urban development.

=== Ground shaking ===
The primary hazard or danger that can be brought by an earthquake is the effect of ground shaking. Buildings or properties can be damaged by the shaking itself or by the ground beneath them settling to a different level than it was before the earthquake. Santa Maria is fortunate to be free from fault lines. The nearest fault line is found at San Jose del Monte City which is just 17 kilometers away from its city proper. However, ground shaking can still be experienced by the town which can pose hazard to properties. Using the Rapid Earthquake Damage Assessment System (REDAS), the planning team was able to simulate the effect of ground shaking at Santa Maria if the nearest fault line located at San Jose del Monte City would move at magnitude 7 and 5 meter depth earthquake. The side effect is estimated to incur slight damage.
