= Fortunato Halili Avenue =

Major road in Bulacan, Philippines

Governor Fortunato F. Halili Avenue
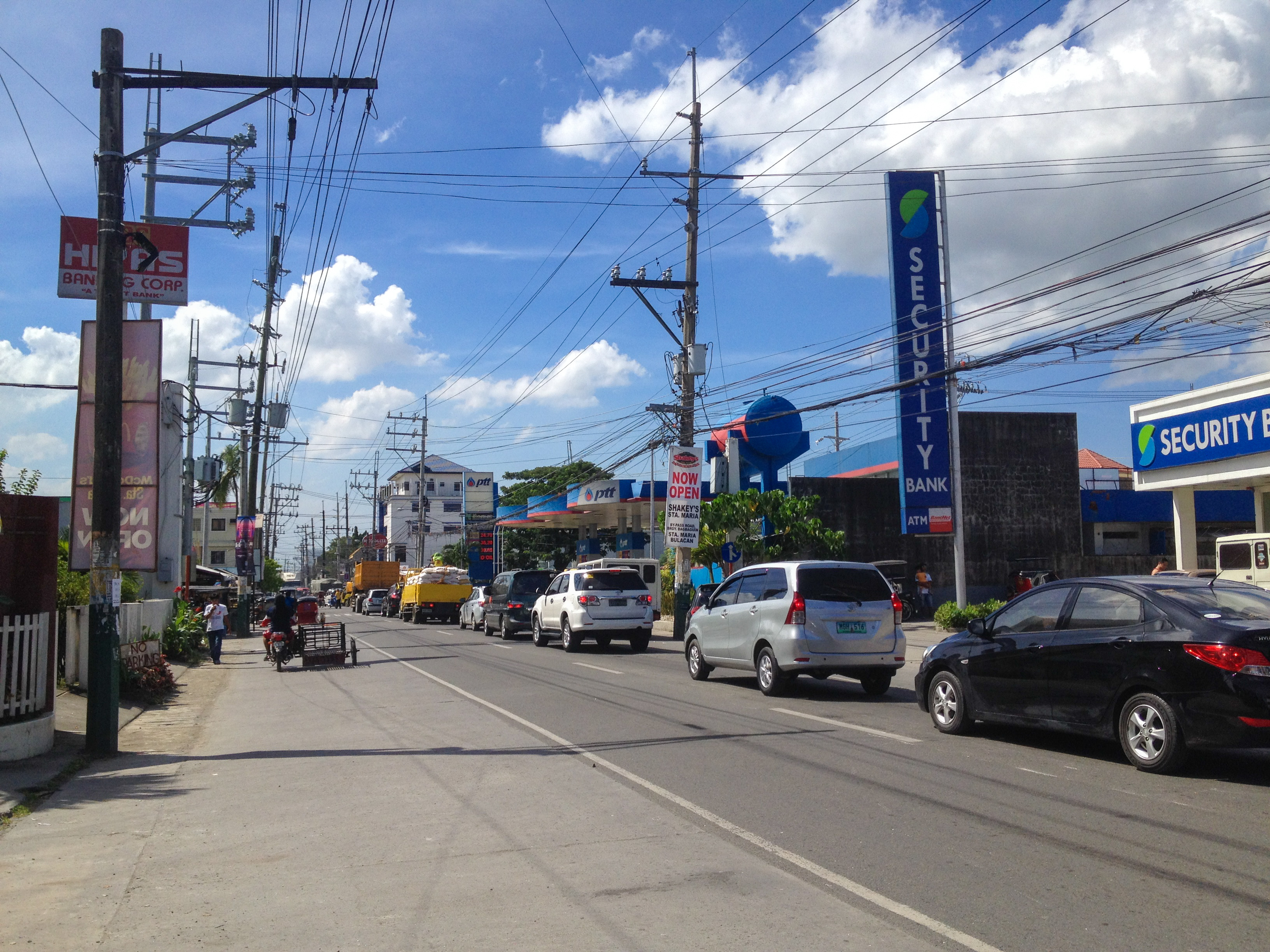
- The road in Bagbaguin, Santa Maria, Bulacan

Route information
- Maintained by Department of Public Works and Highways (Note: Excluding the road's section west of MacArthur Highway in Bocaue.)
- Length: 18.1 km (11.2 mi)

Major junctions
- East end: N127 (Quirino Highway) in San Jose del Monte (Note: Eastern end as Santa Maria-Tungkong Mangga Road)
- Miguel Villarica Road in San Jose Del Monte; Santa Maria Bypass Road in Santa Maria; AH 26 (E1) (North Luzon Expressway in Bocaue; N1 (MacArthur Highway) in Bocaue)
- West end: J.P. Rizal Street & Biñang 1st Road in Bocaue

Location
- Country: Philippines
- Provinces: Bulacan
- Major cities: San Jose del Monte (Note: The section of the avenue from Santa Maria to San Jose del Monte is also called Santa Maria-Tungkong Mangga Road)
- Towns: Santa Maria; Bocaue

Highway system
- Roads in the Philippines; Highways; Expressways; List

The Governor Fortunato F. Halili Avenue, simply known as the Governor Halili Avenue, is a two-to-four lane national road and one of the major thoroughfares of the city of San Jose del Monte and the municipalities of Santa Maria and Bocaue in Bulacan, Philippines. It named after Fortunato Halili, a native of Santa Maria who served as governor of Bulacan from 1943 to 1944 and from 1946 to 1951.

== Route description ==
Fortunato Halili Avenue starts at the intersection with J.P. Rizal Street and Biñang 1st Road in the municipality of Bocaue in Bulacan. Running in parallel to the Santa Maria River, it then crosses MacArthur Highway and the North Luzon Expressway's Bocaue Exit. It enters Santa Maria after NLEX. It was bisected near the Santa Maria bridge and continues as Santa Maria–Tungkong Mangga Road. It enters San Jose del Monte after a few meters. It then intersects with the San Jose del Monte–Marilao Road, also known as Miguel Villarica Road, and then terminates at the Quirino Highway in Barangay Tungkong Mangga, San Jose del Monte, where it is continued by a small street named Bocaue Road.

Its section from Bocaue to Muzon, San Jose del Monte is also known as Bocaue–San Jose Road, while its remaining section up to Quirino Highway is also known as Muzon–Tungkong Mangga Road and íts section from Santa Maria westwards is also known as Santa Maria–Tungkong Mangga Road.
