= Polytechnic University of the Philippines Santa Maria =

Public university in Bulacan, Philippines

Polytechnic University of the Philippines Santa Maria Campus
- Politeknikong Unibersidad ng Pilipinas Santa Maria (Filipino)
- Motto: Tanglaw ng Bayan
- Type: state university
- Established: 2005
- Campus Director: Dr. Arman DC. Santos
- Location: Santa Maria, Bulacan, Philippines; 14°52′11″N 120°59′57″E
- Newspaper: Iskolarium
- University hymn: Imno ng PUP
- Colors: Maroon and Gold
- Website: www.pup.edu.ph
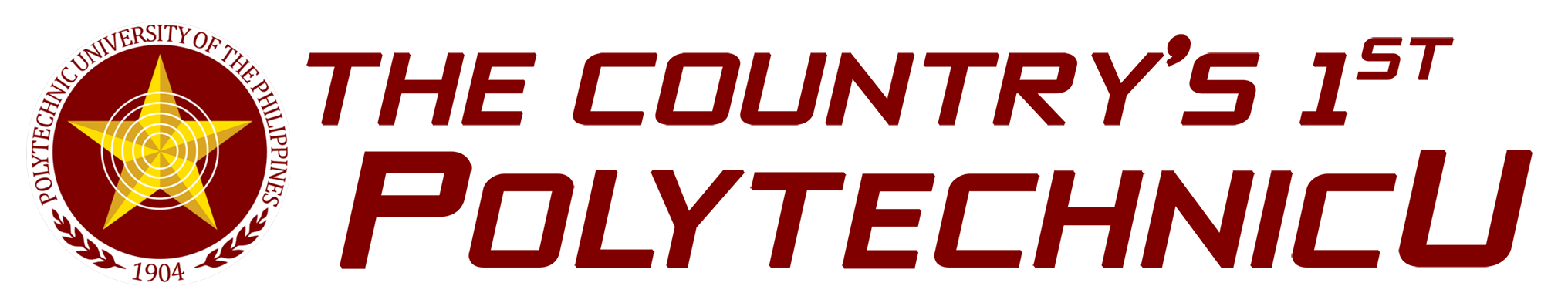

- Location in Bulacan Location in Luzon Location in the Philippines

Polytechnic University of the Philippines, Santa Maria, Bulacan Campus or PUP-SMBC (Filipino: Politeknikong Unibersidad ng Pilipinas, Sudlong ng Santa Maria) is a PUP extension campus in Sitio Gulod, Brgy. Pulong-Buhangin, municipality of Santa Maria, Bulacan province, Philippines, offering undergraduate programs.

The extension was created through a Memorandum of Agreement between the university and the Santa Maria Municipality government. Professor Emilia C. Mateo, MAT, MBE served as the extension's first directress, followed by Prof. Arlene R. Queri then Prof. Orlando Batongbakal (as OIC), Engr. Aureluz L. Torres, Prof. Kathryn Placido (as Acting Director), Lualhati dela Cruz, Prof. Jose M. Abat and Prof. Ricardo F. Ramiscal took the position followed by Prof. Artemus G. Cruz, Dr. Marissa Baybay, Dr. Marilyn Isip, and Dr. Arman DC. Santos serving as the current director of the campus

In May 2026, PUP Santa Maria Bulacan Campus celebrated its 21st Founding Anniversary with the theme “Sambisig sa Ika-21."

== Courses ==
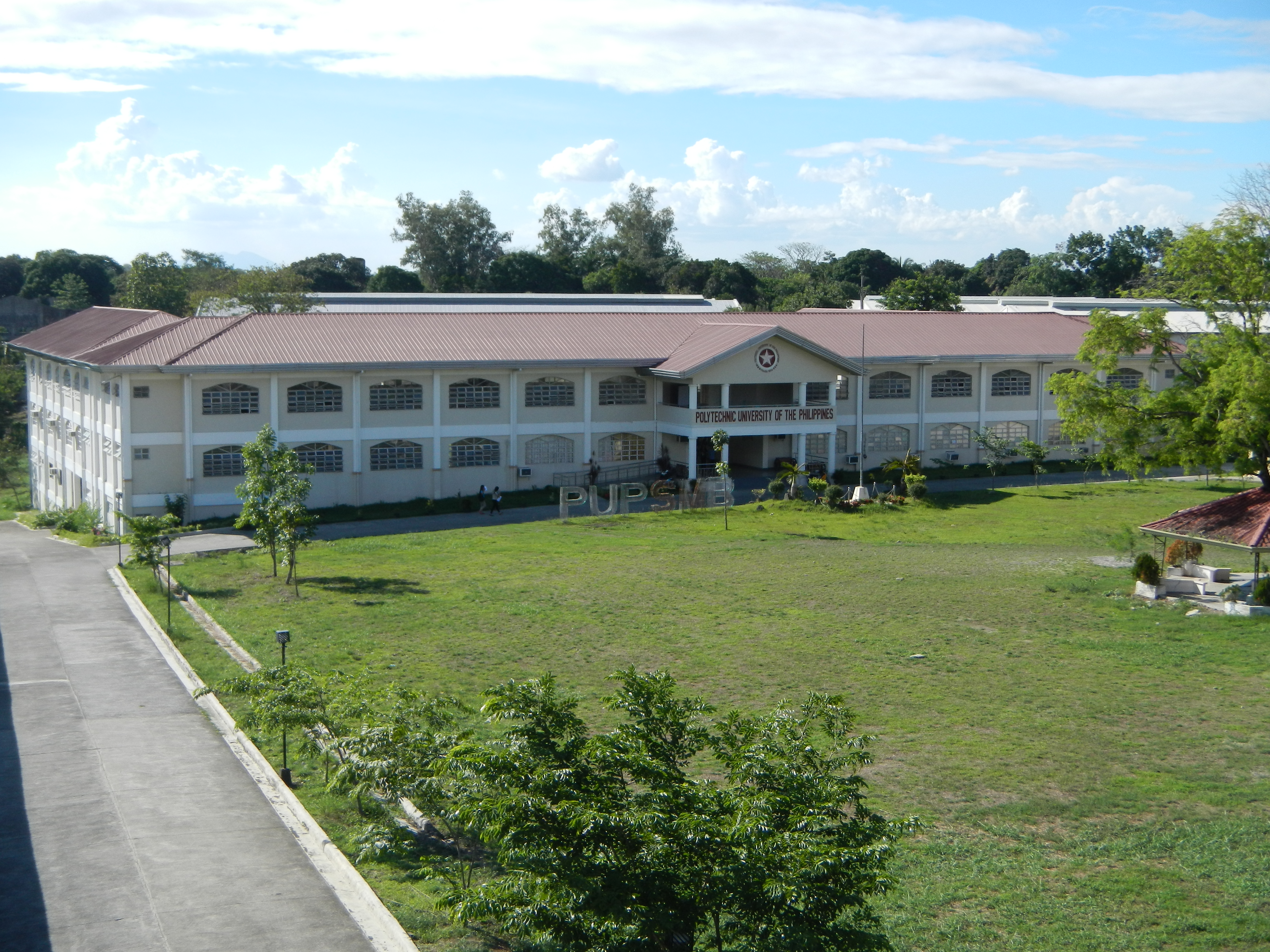
Facade

College of Accountancy (COA)

- Bachelor of Science in Accountancy (BSA)

College of Business (CB)

- Bachelor of Science in Entrepreneurship (BSEntrep)

College of Engineering (CE)

- Bachelor of Science in Computer Engineering (BSCpe)

College of Education (COED)

- Bachelor in Secondary Education Major in English (BSEd-English)
- Bachelor in Secondary Education Major in Mathematics (BSEd-Math)

College of Computer Management and Information Technology (CCMIT)

- Bachelor of Science in Information Technology (BSIT)

College of Tourism and Hotel and Restaurant Management (CTHRM)

- Bachelor of Science in Hospitality Management (BSHM)

College of Technology (CT)

- Diploma in Office Management Technology (DOMT)

== University Organizations ==
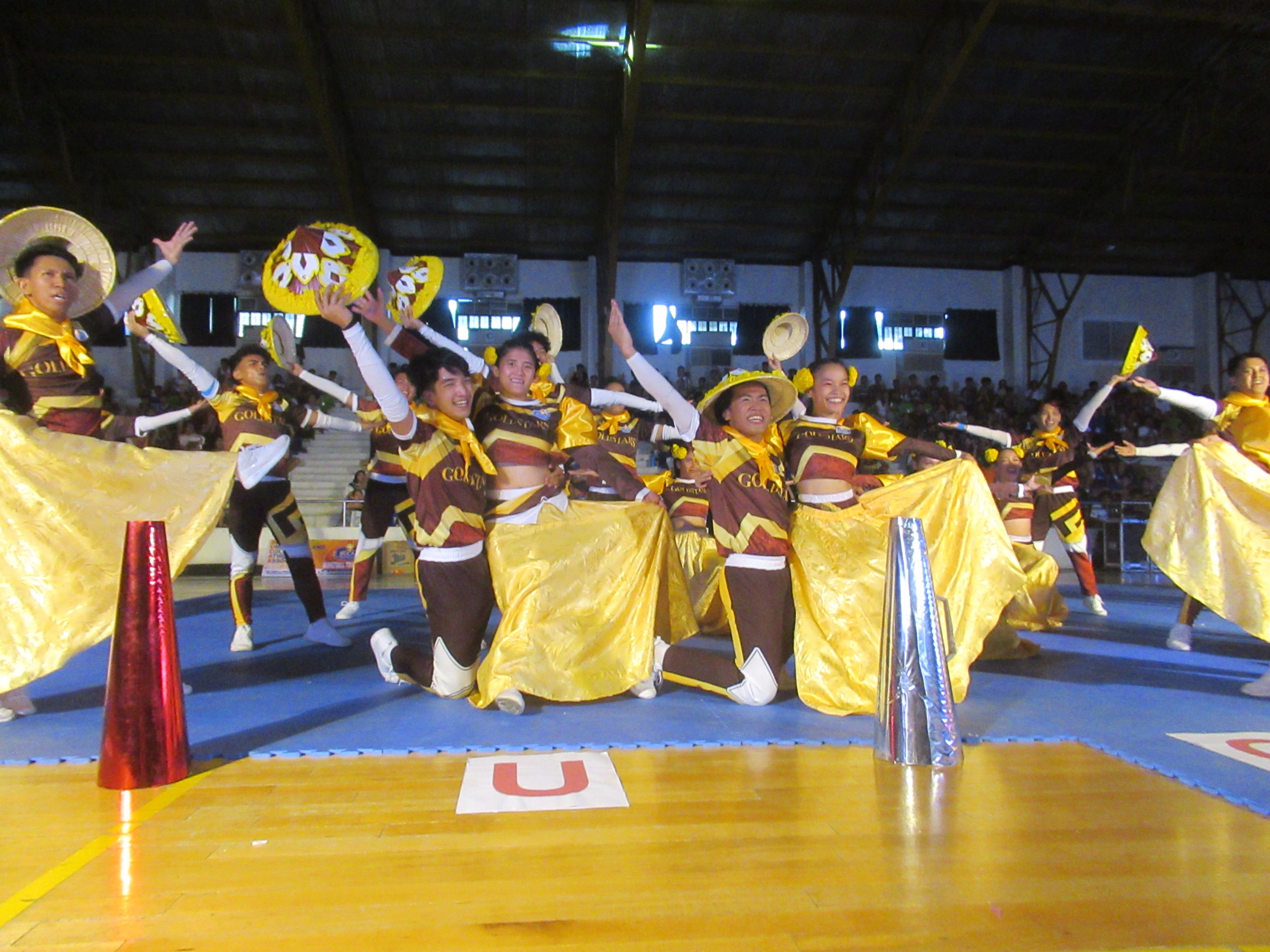
Student cheerleaders competitors, 2024

- PUP Santa Maria Bulacan Student Council
- Junior Philippine Institute of Accountants
- Philippine Institute of Civil Engineering PUP SMB Chapter
- Association of Future Teachers
- Alliance of Computer Engineering Students
- Chambers of Entrepreneurs and Managers
- Hospitality Management Society
- Integrated Students of Information Technology
- Office Management Technology Sy-Quest
- Iskolarium: Pamayanan ng Pantas at Iskolar
