= Reylina Nicolas =

Filipino politician

Reylina G. Nicolas

13th Mayor of Santa Maria, Bulacan
- In office June 30, 1992 – June 30, 2001
- Preceded by: Eriberto Ramos
- Succeeded by: Bartolome Ramos

Member of the Philippine House of Representatives from the Bulacan's 4th congressional district
- In office June 30, 2001 – June 30, 2010
- Preceded by: Angelito Sarmiento
- Succeeded by: Linabelle Villarica

Personal details
- Born: Reylina Gustavo Nicolas; February 1, 1945 (age 81) Barangay Bagbaguin, Santa Maria, Bulacan
- Party: Lakas
- Spouse: Ricardo D. Nicolas Jr.
- Occupation: Politician

Reylina "Neneng" Nicolas

Reylina "Neneng" Nicolas (born December 19, 1945) is a Filipino politician. A member of Lakas–CMD, she has been elected to three terms as the Mayor of Santa Maria, Bulacan from 1992 to 2001 and three terms as a Member of the House of Representatives of the Philippines, representing the Fourth District of Bulacan from 2001 to 2010.

Neneng is a member of the Nicolas political family of Bulacan, whose involvement in public office dates to the 1950s. Her father-in-law, Ricardo Nicolas Sr., served as mayor of Santa Maria, Bulacan, from 1956 to 1959 and again from 1964 to 1967. Her husband, Ricardo “Dick” Nicolas Jr., subsequently served as mayor of Santa Maria from 1972 to 1986 and as vice governor of Bulacan from 1986 to 1989.

Reylina Nicolas continued the family's political presence in Santa Maria. She served as a member of the Sangguniang Panlalawigan before becoming mayor of Santa Maria from 1992 to 2001. She subsequently represented Bulacan's 4th congressional district in the House of Representatives for three consecutive terms, from 2001 to 2010.

The family's political involvement continued into a fourth generation with Edward “Dingdong” Nicolas, Kirk “Kiko” Nicolas, and Myron Nicolas.

Dingdong Nicolas began his public career in the Sangguniang Kabataan, serving as SK Federation President, before becoming a municipal councilor and subsequently a member of the Sangguniang Panlalawigan.

Kiko Nicolas, a law graduate, worked as a legal researcher in the House of Representatives and later served as a congressional chief of staff before entering elective politics as a city councilor.

Myron Nicolas likewise entered public service through youth and local government, serving as a municipal councilor and president of the Bulacan Provincial SK Federation before becoming a member of the provincial board.

Political offices
Preceded by Eriberto Ramos	Mayor of Santa Maria, Bulacan; 1992–2001	Succeeded by Bartolome Ramos
House of Representatives of the Philippines
Preceded by Angelito M. Sarmiento	Representative, 4th District of Bulacan; 2001–2010	Succeeded by Linabelle Villarica
