= Santa Maria River (Philippines) =

River in Bulacan, Philippines

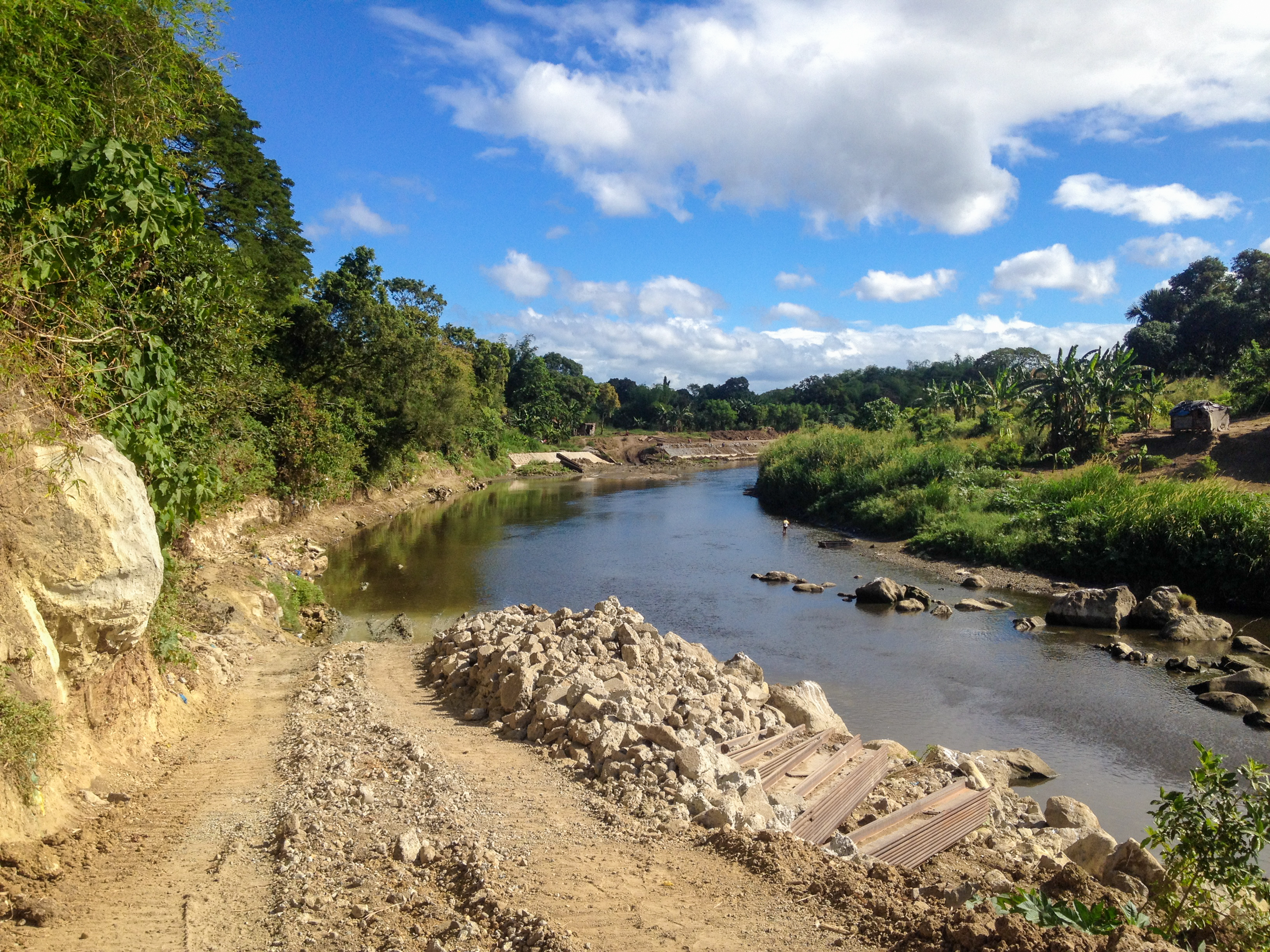
- Santa Maria River near Sitio Macaiban, Barangay Poblacion, Santa Maria

- Santa Maria River mouth Santa Maria River (Philippines) (Philippines)
- Native name: Ilog ng Santa Maria (Tagalog)

Location
- Country: Philippines
- Region: Central Luzon
- Province: Bulacan
- City/municipality: Santa Maria; San Jose del Monte; Bocaue; Bulakan

Physical characteristics
- Source: Sierra Madre mountains
  - location: Norzagaray, Bulacan
- Mouth
  - location: Bulakan
  - coordinates: 14°45′57″N 120°54′53″E
  - elevation: 0 m (0 ft)
- Length: 31 km (19 mi)

Basin features
- Tributaries
  - left: Caypombo River (Pulo River), Santa Clara River

The Santa Maria River (Filipino: Ilog Santa Maria) is a river in the province of Bulacan, Philippines. Stretching for 31 kilometres (19.3 mi), it bisects the municipalities of Santa Maria, Bocaue (in barangay Lolomboy) and the city of San Jose del Monte. Its major tributaries are the Caypombo River and an unnamed river in San Jose del Monte.
