= Mayor of Santa Maria, Bulacan =

Mayor of Santa Maria
- Incumbent; Bartolome R. Ramos since June 30, 2022
- Style: (Mr.) Mayor, Honorable Mayor
- Residence: Santa Maria Municipal Hall, Poblacion, Santa Maria, Bulacan
- Appointer: Elected via popular vote
- Term length: 3 years (maximum of three consecutive terms)
- Inaugural holder: Maximo Evidente
- Formation: 1899

The mayor of Santa Maria (Filipino: Punong Bayan ng Santa Maria) is the highest decision-maker and chief executive of the municipality of Santa Maria, Bulacan, Philippines. He leads the enforcement of municipal ordinances and improvement of public services. The mayor has a term of office of three years, but has a maximum electoral tenure of three consecutive terms. Inaugural holder of the office was Maximo Evidente (1899-1900).

The present 1987 Constitution of the Philippines defined the position, powers and responsibilities of the mayor as well as the municipal charter.

== Town of Santa Maria (1793-Present) ==
There were 82 capitanes who served the Spanish colonial administration from 1793 to 1899; 12 Presidentes from 1899 to 1937; 4 Alcaldes from 1938 to 1947 and 11 Mayors under various terms and succession from 1947 to present.

=== Spanish Era (1793-1899) ===
- 1793 Andres dela Cruz
- 1794 Juan Sarmiento
- 1795 Francisco Sarmiento
- 1796 Agustin de Jesus
- 1797 Josep Maningas
- 1798 Lorenzo Geronimo
- 1799 Lorenzo Bayani
- 1800 Nicolas Hernandez
- 1801 Juan Ramos
- 1802 Fermin Santa Maria
- 1803 Sebastian Diaz
- 1804 Jose Serapio
- 1805 Ubaldo de los Santos
- 1806 Pablo de los Santos
- 1807 Miguel Nicolas
- 1808 Blas Marcelo
- 1809 Josep Maningas
- 1810 Ventura Alday
- 1811 Pablo de los Santos
- 1812 Francisco de la Cruz
- 1813 Bonifacio Perez
- 1814 Lorenzo Isidro
- 1815 Domingo Felix
- 1816 Pascual Geronimo
- 1817 Blas Marcelo
- 1818 Vicente Policarpio
- 1819 Matias San Buenaventura
- 1820 Pedro Catahan
- 1821 Cristobal del Rosario
- 1822 Domingo Mateo
- 1823 Andres Catahan
- 1824 Andres Ignacio
- 1825 Matias San Buenaventura
- 1826 Marcos D. Guevarra
- 1827 Domingo de los Santos
- 1828 Santiago Marcelo
- 1829 Martin de la Cruz
- 1830 Antonio Toribia
- 1831 Blas del Rosario
- 1832 Pascual Enriquez
- 1833 Mariano Serapio
- 1834 Mariano Serapio
- 1835 Mariano Serapio
- 1836 Martin de Jesus
- 1837 Tomas Felix
- 1838 Santiago Marcelo
- 1839 Manuel Francisco
- 1840 Lorenzo San Buenaventura
- 1841 Felix de Jesus
- 1842 Miguel Alday
- 1843 Manuel Francisco
- 1844 Francisco Martinez
- 1845 Feliciano Ignacio
- 1846 Francisco de los Reyes
- 1847 Victor Geronimo
- 1848 Juan de la Torre
- 1849 Mariano Serapio
- 1850 Pedro de la Torre
- 1851 Roman J. de Vera
- 1852 Blas Geronimo
- 1853 Blas Geronimo
- 1854 Blas Geronimo
- 1855 Blas Geronimo
- 1856 Domingo Geraldes Cruz
- 1857 Mariano Gener Cruz
- 1858 Mariano Serapio
- 1860 Jose Serapio
- 1861 Juan Gerona Cruz
- 1862 Atanacio Mendoza
- 1863 Jose Serapio
- 1864 Jose Serapio
- 1865 Jose Serapio
- 1866 Jose Serapio
- 1867 Mariano Serapio
- 1868 Mariano Serapio
- 1869 Blas Geronimo
- 1870 Blas Geronimo
- 1871 Moises Gimeno Cruz
- 1872 Moises Gimeno Cruz
- 1873 Jose Serapio
- 1874 Jose Serapio
- 1875 Mariano Serapio
- 1876 Mariano Serapio
- 1877 Mariano Perez
- 1878 Mariano Perez
- 1879 Mariano Serapio
- 1880 Mariano Serapio
- 1881 Jose Serapio
- 1882 Jose Serapio
- 1883 Jose Serapio
- 1884 Jose Serapio
- 1885 Pascual Mateo
- 1886 Pascual Mateo
- 1887 Mariano de Leon
- 1888 Mariano de Leon
- 1889 Silvino Perez
- 1890 Domingo Diaz
- 1891 Domingo Diaz
- 1892 Silvino Perez
- 1893 Silvino Perez
- 1894 Silvino Perez
- 1895 Eugenio Alberto
- 1896 Eugenio Alberto
- 1897 Eugenio Alberto
- 1898 Pascual Mateo
- 1899 Pascual Mateo

=== 1899-Present ===
==== Presidentes ====
No.	Mayor/Presidentes/Alcaldes (Birth–Death)	Took office	Left office	Notes
1	Maximo Evidente	1899	1900	Appointed by the Americans as the municipal president (presidente municipal) of the municipality in 1899.
2	Teodoro Geronimo	1900	1901	
3	Maximo de Jesus	1901	1903	
4	Pedro Gallardo	1903	1906	
5	Juan Mendoza	1906	1910	He started the first semi-cooperative store called "Panaligan".
6	Marciano de Leon	1910	1912	
7	Bonifacio Morales	1912	1916	He belonged to the Laging Laan Party.
8	Antonio Rodriguez	1916	1919	Also a Laging Laan Party who sought jobs for the jobless specially among his co-political party.
9	Mariano Santiago	1919	1922	Another Laging Laan member. He was another towering disciplinarian who promoted peace and order during the activeness of the thieves at the time of Liberation from the Americans.
10	Cipriano de Guzman	1922	1928	A Bagong Bayan affiliate. He was the first to dig the first water deposit for the waterworks system of the municipality which was first found near the main RHU center in Poblacion. Water kept pouring to the site, an indication that the first step of water system of Poblacion was just around the corner.
11	Agustin Morales	1928	1934	He was the first to join the Liberal Party. He was a Notary Public, who during his term, the main water tank in Gulod, Poblacion was constructed. He Extended water pipes and water system in the whole Poblacion.
12	Fortunato F. Halili (1898-??)	1934	1937	Another Laging Laan, whose dedication to his service was shown by not receiving his salary. His councilmen were rotated to act as Presidente. He Served as the 22nd governor of Bulacan from 1946-1950.
13	Pedro J. Mansilla (1892-1941)	1938	1940	
14	Dr. Teofilo S. Santiago	1941	1945	He was famously known as Dr. Kamoteng Kahoy during the Japanese Occupation. To save people from hunger, he obliged every family to plant kamoteng kahoy (cassava) and have backyard poultry.
15	Ireneo Hermogenes	1945	1945	He was appointed Municipal Mayor under the Commonwealth Government.
16	Marciano Bautista	1946	1947	
17	Conrado H. Ignacio	1947	1955	He promoted peace and order against the group of dissidents called "Canaps" which was headed by Benigno Ramos.
18	Ricardo G. Nicolas, Sr.	1956	1959	He helped the poor specially of their living. Belong to Liberal Party.
19	Eriberto R. Ramos	1960	1963	Another mayor who did not personally receive his salary. He was the first to construct cemented roads in the Poblacion. He belonged to the Nacionalista Party.
20	Ricardo G. Nicolas, Sr.	1964	1967	Constructed roads specially the barangay roads.
21	Paulino Luciano, Sr.	1968	1971	He was in Nacionalista Party. Under his term, first floor of the New Municipal Building was constructed.
22	Ricardo D. Nicolas, Jr.	1972	1978	Finished the construction of the first floor of the New Municipal Building. He also launched several projects of the government like construction of artesian wells, implementation of population and nutrition programs, as well as other development projects in the municipality, be it infrastructure or social services.
23	Paulino A. Luciano, Jr. (1942-2023)	1978	1986	Second floor of the New Municipal Building was constructed. Made proposal for the construction of new public market.
24	Dr. Alfredo M. Perez	1986	1986	Appointed mayor by President Corazon Aquino.
25	Ricardo D. Nicolas, Jr.	1986	1986	Acting mayor.
26	Benjamin G. Geronimo	1987	1988	Acting mayor.
27	Atty. Ramon H. Clemente	1988	1988	Acting mayor.
28	Eriberto R. Ramos	1988	1992	
29	Reylina G. Nicolas (1945)	1992	2001	The first female mayor of Santa Maria.
30	Bartolome R. Ramos (1943)	2001	2004	
31	Jesus R. Mateo (1953-2021)	2004	2007	
(30)	Bartolome R. Ramos (1943)	2007	2016	
31	Russel Pleyto	2016	2022	
(30)	Bartolome R. Ramos (1943)	2022	incumbent	
