= Santa Maria, Bulacan =

Municipality in Bulacan, Philippines

Santa Maria
- Municipality
- Municipality of Santa Maria
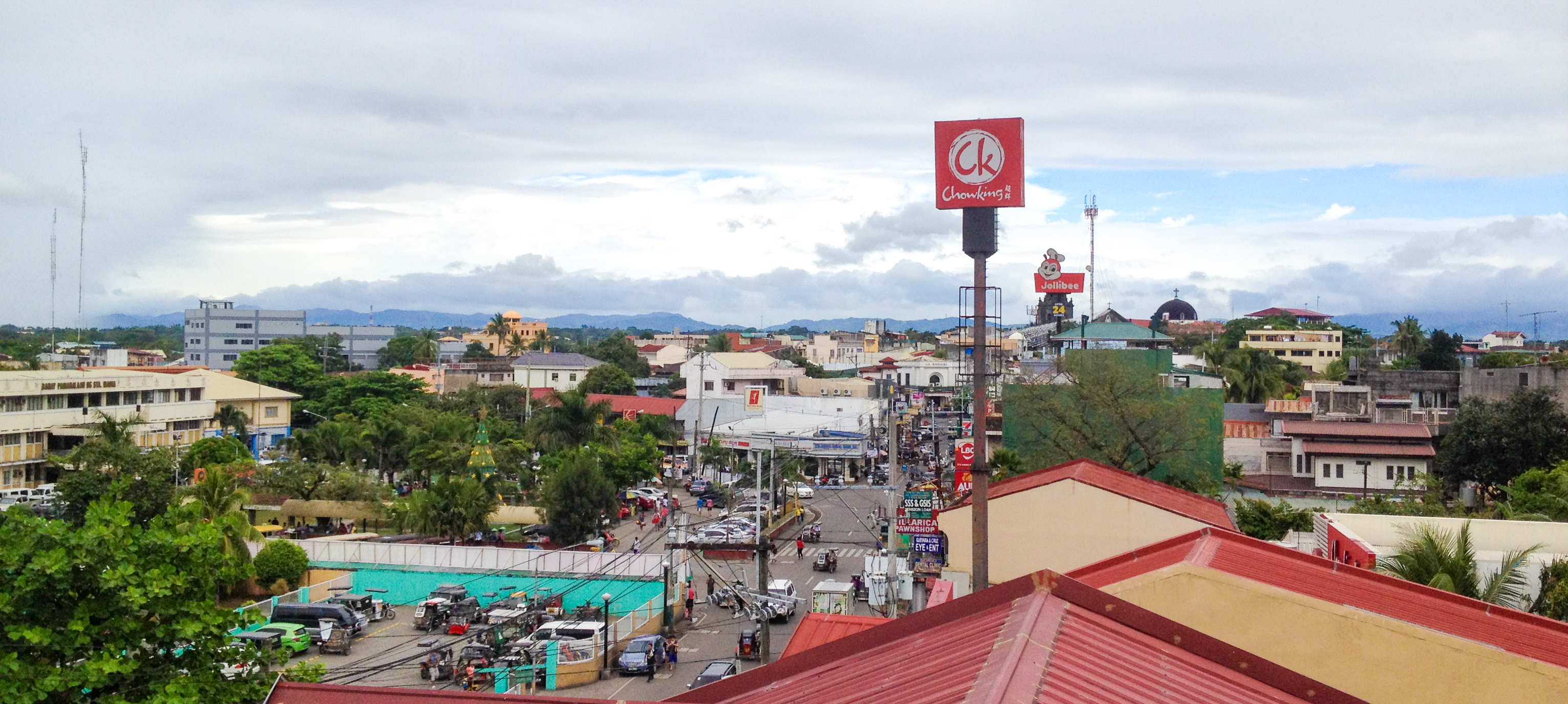
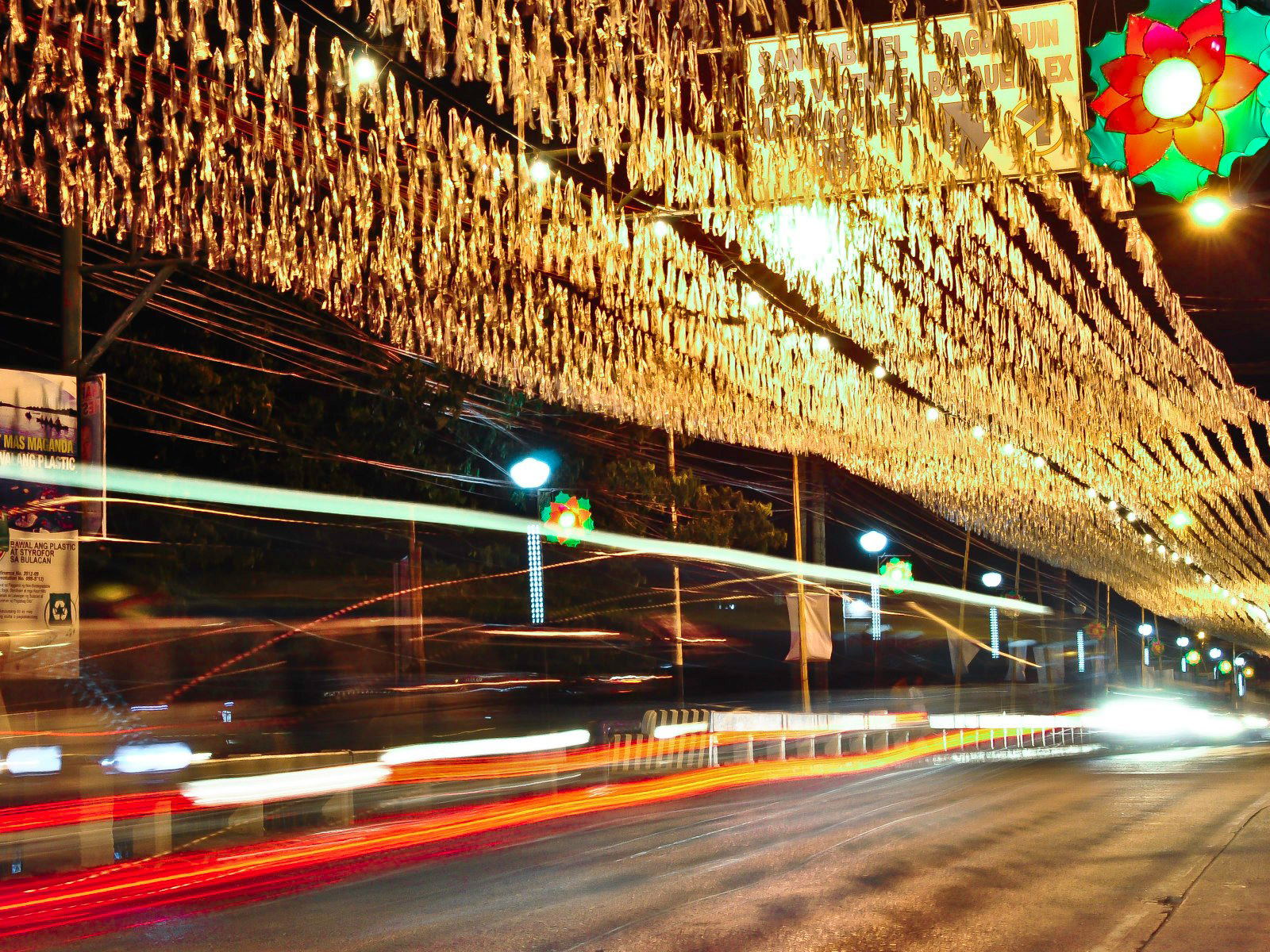
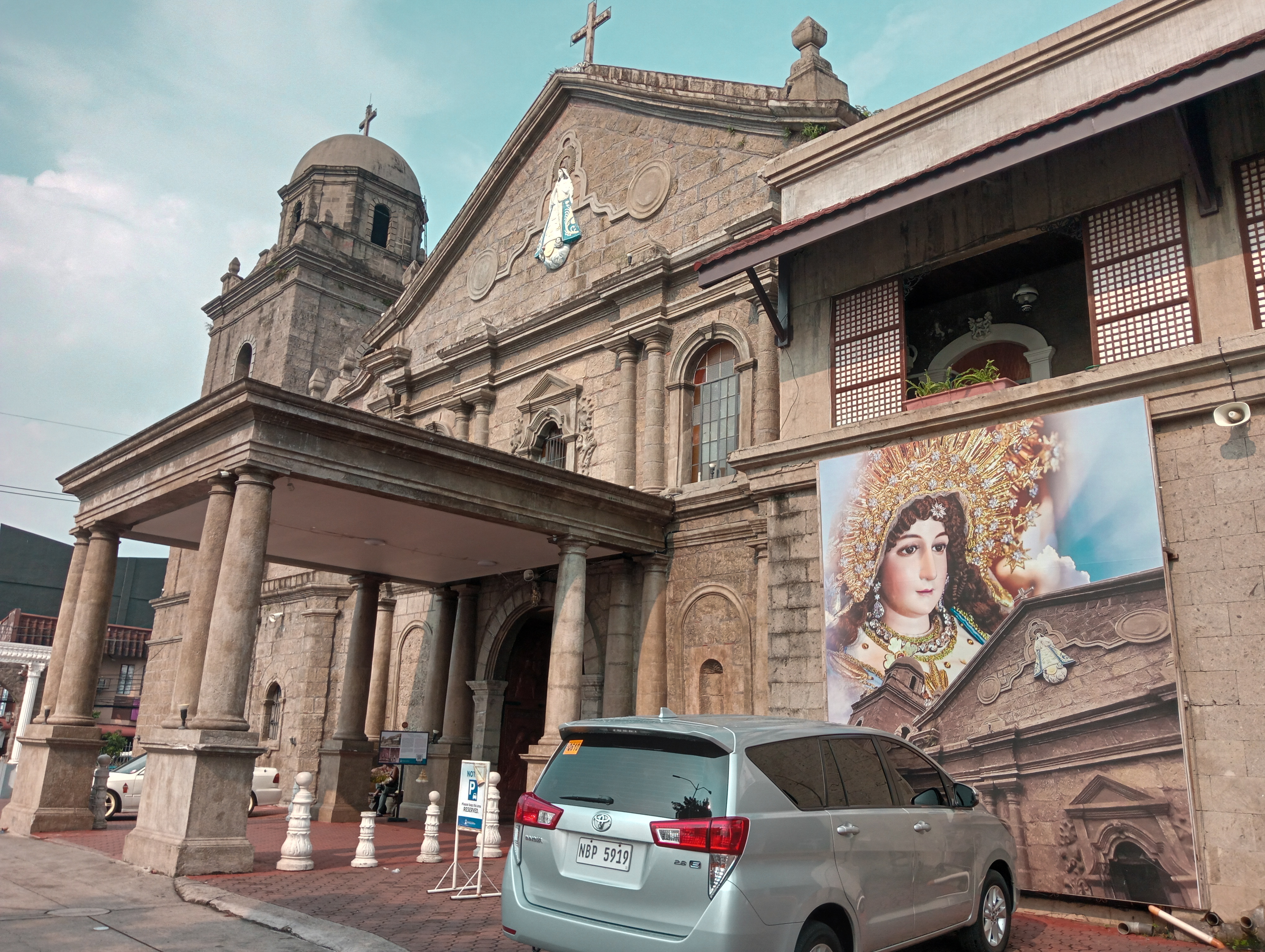
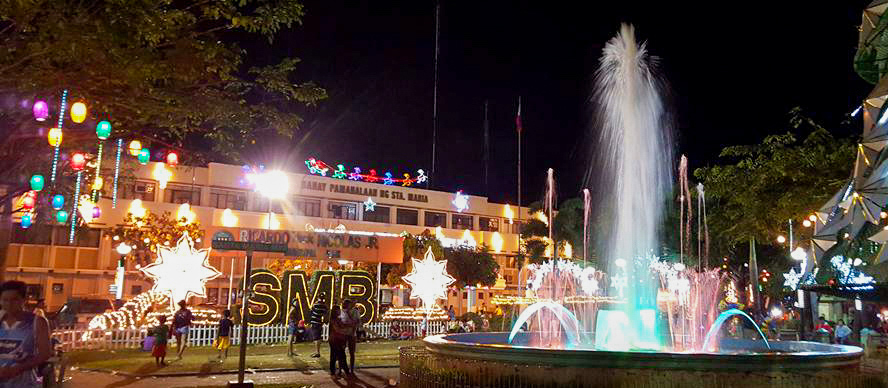
- (From top, left to right): Población skyline • Paso Bridge • Immaculate Conception Church • Philippine Arena • Municipal Hall at night

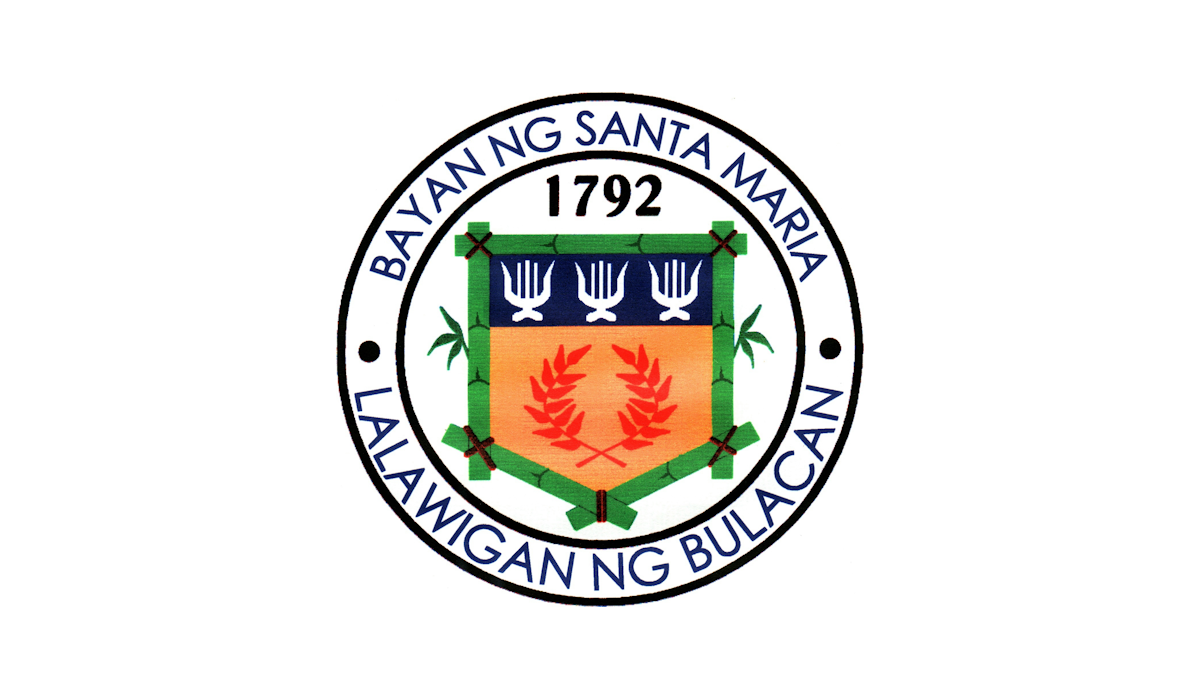
- Flag Seal
- Nickname: Chicharon Capital of the Philippines
- Motto: ONE Santa Maria, Lahat Kasama (English: ONE Santa Maria, All Together)
- Anthem: Bayan Kong Mahal (English: My Beloved Town)
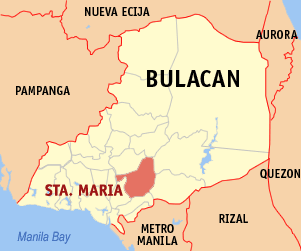
- Map of Bulacan with Santa Maria highlighted
- Interactive map of Santa Maria
- Location within the Philippines
- Coordinates: 14°49′N 120°58′E
- Country: Philippines
- Region: Central Luzon
- Province: Bulacan
- District: 6th district
- Founded: 13th century CE (part of the Kingdom of Tondo)
- Incorporated: .
  - Barrio: circa 1647
  - Hacienda: July 4, 1699
  - Pueblo: November 26, 1793
- Founder: Fray Francisco Javier OFM
- Barangays: 24 (see Barangays)

Government
  - Type: Sangguniang Bayan
  - Mayor: Bartolome R. Ramos
  - Vice Mayor: Roberto B. Perez
  - Representative: Salvador A. Pleyto Sr.
  - Municipal Council: Members: Angelito C. Jacinto; Froilan C. Caguiat; Mark Angelo R. Clemente; Eresto S. Dela Cruz; Neil B. Mateo; Carl G. Castillo; Esperanza G. Ramos; Rico Jude P. Sto. Domingo
  - Electorate: 159,429 voters (2025)

Area
  - Total: 90.92 km^{2} (35.10 sq mi)
- Elevation: 20 m (66 ft)
- Highest elevation: 62 m (203 ft)
- Lowest elevation: −1 m (−3.3 ft)

Population (2024 census)
  - Total: 322,525
  - Rank: 5 out of 1,489 Municipalities
  - Density: 3,547/km^{2} (9,188/sq mi)
  - Households: 70,619
- Demonym: Santa Maríans

Economy
  - Income class: 1st municipal income class
  - Poverty incidence: 11.73% (2023)
  - Revenue: ₱ 1,232 million (2024)
  - Assets: ₱ 2,572 million (2024)
  - Expenditure: ₱ 1,109 million (2024)
  - Liabilities: ₱ 370.3 million (2024)

Service provider
  - Electricity: Manila Electric Company (Meralco)
- Time zone: UTC+8 (PST)
- ZIP code: 3022
- PSGC: 0301423000
- IDD : area code: +63 (0)44
- Native languages: Tagalog
- Catholic diocese: Diocese of Malolos
- Patron saint: Our Lady of The Immaculate Conception

Santa Maria (/ˌsæntə məˈriːə/ SAN-tə mə-REE-ə, Tagalog: [ˈsantɐ mɐˈɾija]), officially the Municipality of Santa Maria (Tagalog: Bayan ng Santa Maria), is a municipality in the province of Bulacan, Philippines. According to the 2024 census, it has a population of 322,525 people.

Located on the banks of the Santa Maria River, Santa Maria has been a thriving settlement for almost four centuries. It was founded as a barrio of Bocaue in the early 17th century until it was established as an independent municipality on November 26, 1793, by the Spanish friar Francisco Dominguez Javier OFM. Known before as Santa Maria de Pandi (Tagalog pronunciation: [pɐnˈde]), it is named under the patronage of the Immaculate Conception (also known as La Purisima Concepcion). Its administrative center, the Poblacion, forms the historic core of the municipality. It is surrounded by four rivers and it still largely retains its 2.88 square-kilometer boundaries since the Spanish Colonial Era.

Santa Maria, with a population of 322,525, remains by a significant margin the most populous municipality in Central Luzon, as well as the 7th most populous municipality in the Philippines. It is also the 2nd most populous local government unit in Bulacan next to San Jose del Monte. The projected population for 2025 was 305,668. There are 142,380 registered voters in the municipality. In the last 2022 election, voter turnout rate is at 88.91%. The said voter turnout rate in the 2022 national elections is the fourth highest among the municipalities in the province of Bulacan.

Its downtown area consists of three highly urbanized barangays: Poblacion, Bagbaguin, and Sta. Clara. It is one of the biggest and busiest commercial centers in the province as it accounts for more than half of all economic activities in the municipality. It is also one of Bulacan's leading financial centers. According to the Bangko Sentral ng Pilipinas (BSP) and the Philippine Deposit Insurance Corporation (PDIC), Santa Maria's total bank deposits reached PHP 31.27 billion as of December 2021, this accounts for almost 75% of Eastern Bulacan's total bank deposits. Likewise, Santa Maria is the richest municipality in Bulacan with an assets totaling to PHP 1.87 billion and revenues reaching an all-time high of PHP 1.206 billion as of the 2022 report from the Commission on Audit (COA). It has a relatively high standard of living, with only 4% of the population living in poverty which is one of the lowest in the country (19 out of 1,489 municipalities).

Santa Maria was the home town of José Corazón de Jesús, a Filipino poet popularly known as "Huseng Batute", who started composing his verse as a child. Another native of Santa Maria is Francisco Santiago, a composer who wrote "Nasaan Ka Irog" and other kundiman songs. In the political arena, Santa Maria has produced three Bulacan governors: Jose Serapio (1900–1901), Trinidad Icasiano (1912–1916), Fortunato Halili (1943–1944 and 1946–1951); and three representatives of the second, fourth district, and sixth district: Rogaciano Mercado (1953–1972, 1987-1989), Reylina Nicolas (2001–2010) and Salvador "Ka Ador" Pleyto (2022 to present).

== Etymology ==
Santa Maria got its name from the Immaculate Conception (also known as La Purisima Concepcion). Formerly known as Santa Maria de Pandi, the second name Pandi was derived from pande, Kapampangan word of "blacksmith," cognate of Tagalog word "panday."

== History ==
=== Pre colonial (before 1521) ===
Before the Spaniards came to the Philippines, Santa Maria was just a vast wilderness, inhabited by wild animals and covered by thick and lush rainforests. Aetas and Dumagats are also known to inhabit the place a long time ago.

=== Spanish Era (1521–1898) ===
Santa Maria's existence can be traced as early as 1647 when it was still a barrio (village) of Bocaue. The barrio was believed to be established on the same period when the Dominicans founded the vast Hacienda de Lolomboy that extends up to the Angat River on the north, Bocaue River on the west, Marilao River on the south and the Pulo River (Pulong Buhangin) on the east.

Santa Maria was founded as an independent town by the Franciscan Fray Francisco Dominguez Javier on November 26, 1793. He began constructing the church which was completed in the early 1800s by Fray Tomas Marti. The construction of the church was viewed as the foundation of the spiritual crusade in the said locality. Natives were converted into Christianity and more people began to inhabit the place. Civil affairs started to take shape and the appointment of the first Capitan del Barrio, Andres dela Cruz, paved way for the permanent establishment of Poblacion, which was the seat of Spanish colonial government. People in those days were just renting their pieces of land. They paid their rents to the friars who were stationed in what is now known as Sta. Clara, a barangay where at present one can see the ruins of a big convento of friars. People from other nearby places such as Bigaa, Pandi, Santa Maria, and San Jose del Monte, paid their rents in this convento. Santa Maria at that time was then called "Santa Maria de Pandi". The people acquired their lands after paying certain sum to the friars and the land became "Lupang Tagalog". The 1818 Spanish census recorded the area having 1,588 native families and 17 Spanish-Filipino families.

There were 82 capitanes who served the Spanish colonial administration from 1793 to 1899.

=== American Era and Japanese Occupation (1898–1946) ===
Under the Americans, the title "captain" was changed to "presidente". The first to hold the position was Maximo Evidente, who served from 1899 to 1900. Of the 12 others who succeeded him, the most popular were Agustin Morales (1928–34) and Fortunato F. Halili (1934–37). Morales was responsible for the construction of the first main water system in the town. Halili, who never drew his salary as executive, later on became Governor of Bulacan. It was during Halili's term as provincial governor when the Capitol building at Malolos was heavily damaged in World War II. He decided to take over and resurge Casa Real de Malolos as a temporary Gubernatorial Office during the period when the Capitol building was severely damaged. It was his effort to rebuild and to reconstruct the Capitol building into its original structure.

During the Japanese Occupation, Dr. Teofilo Santiago, dubbed as Dr. Kamoteng Kahoy for his widespread campaign among the town's citizenry to plant cassava, became mayor of Santa Maria. Santiago was also responsible for the launching of the poultry industry – a livelihood project which earned for the town the distinction of being "The Egg Basket of the Philippines". He was also the "Father of Santa Maria Dairy Plant". After the Liberation, Capitan Ireneo Hermogenes was appointed Municipal Mayor from March 20, 1945, to October 1945. He was succeeded by Marciano Bautista.

From the American colonial rule until the restoration period after World War II, Santa Maria was administered by 12 Presidentes from 1899 to 1937 and 4 Alcaldes from 1938 to 1947.

=== Liberation period (1947–present) ===
The post-liberation period saw Conrado Ignacio as the first elected Mayor of Santa Maria (1947–1955). He was succeeded by prominent personalities in Santa Maria local politics such as Ricardo G. Nicolas Sr. (1956–1959/1964–1967), Eriberto Ramos, Sr. (1960–1963), Paulino M. Luciano Sr. (1968–1971), Ricardo D. Nicolas, Jr.(1972–1978) and Paulino Luciano, Jr. (1979–1986).

After the People Power Revolution in February 1986, President Corazon Aquino appointed Dr. Alfredo Perez, who was then the vice mayor of the town, as Officer-in-Charge of the municipality until May 1986, when he was replaced by Ricardo Nicolas, Jr. In December 1986, however, Nicolas was appointed OIC Vice Governor of Bulacan and was succeeded by Benjamin G. Geronimo (1987–1988) and Atty. Ramon H. Clemente (1988).

During the 1988 elections, Eriberto Ramos was elected Mayor and served until June 30, 1992. On July 1, 1992, he was succeeded by Reylina G. Nicolas. Her three terms of leadership gave the municipality various awards and citations. On July 1, 1993, the municipality rose from to second-class municipality and July 1, 1996, the income level of the municipality rose again from second-class municipality to first-class municipality. In the 2001 elections, Nicolas ran for Representative of the 4th Congressional District of Bulacan and won a landslide victory with more than 80,000 votes over her closest rival. Nicolas was succeeded by Bartolome R. Ramos.

During the 2004 elections, Jesus Mateo defeated the incumbent Ramos and became mayor of the municipality until 2007. One of Mateo's accomplishments as mayor of Santa Maria was the establishment of the Santa Maria extension campus of the Polytechnic University of the Philippines in 2005. In 2007 elections, Bartolome R. Ramos defeated Mateo and became mayor of the municipality again.

== Geography ==
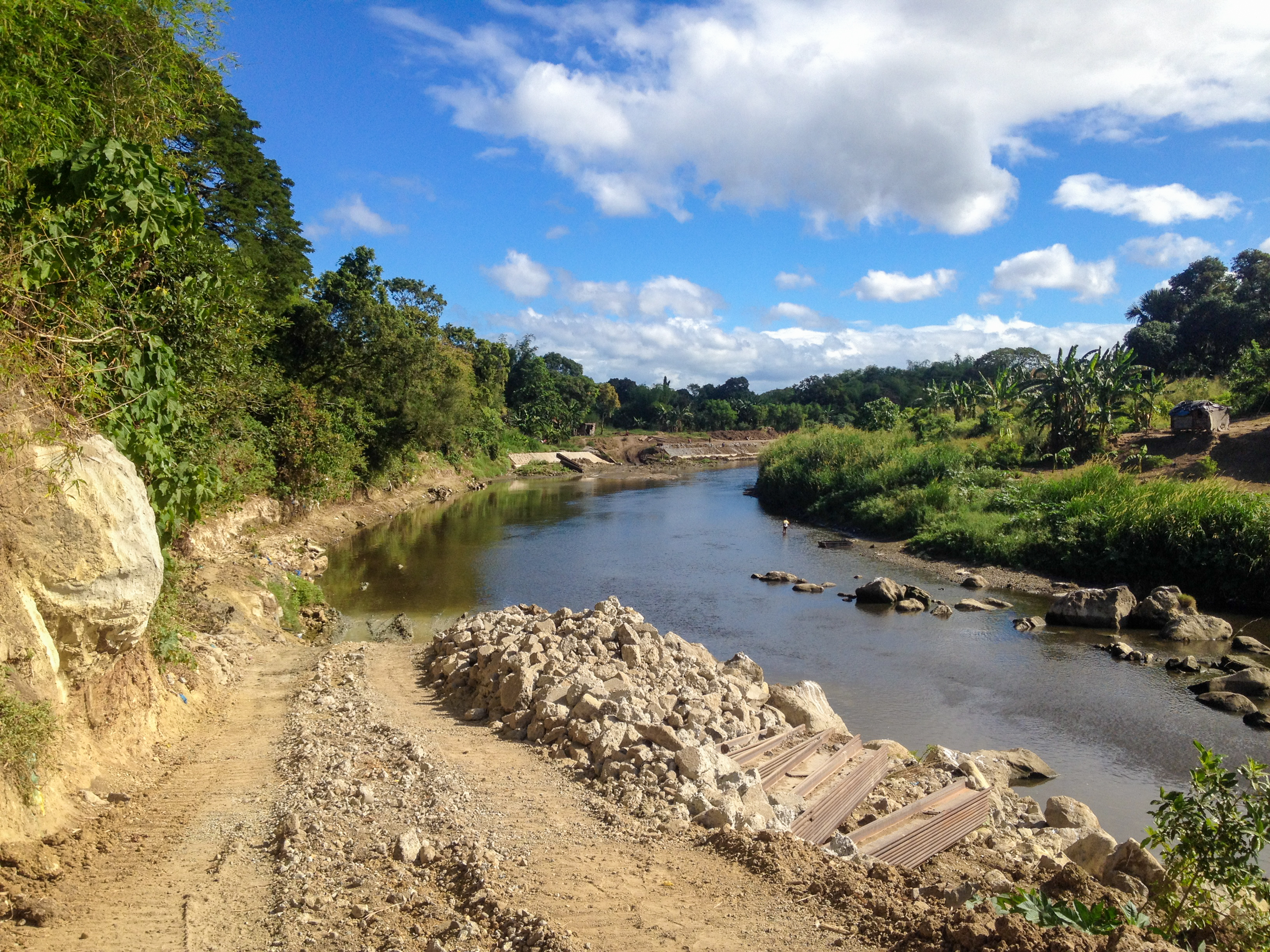
The Santa Maria River is the 2nd largest river in Bulacan by water volume and the 4th longest.

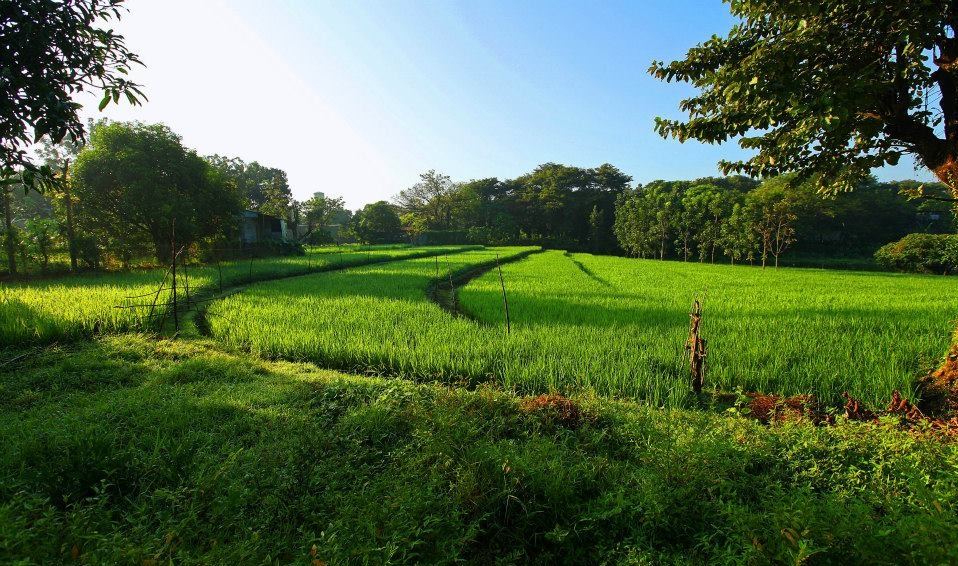
A paddy field in Bulac. Agriculture remains a major source of income in the municipality.

Santa Maria lies 30 kilometres (19 mi) north-east of Manila and 21 kilometres (13 mi) away from Malolos City; it is located at the eastern portion of Bulacan. The town is bounded to the north by the municipalities of Angat and Pandi; a portion of San Jose del Monte City to the south; Norzagaray and other portions of San Jose del Monte to the east; and the municipalities of Marilao and Bocaue to the west.

Santa Maria has a land area of about 9,092.5 hectares (22,468 acres). The town is generally plain although hilly at the northern portion. It has a lone body of water – the Santa Maria River.

The topography of Santa Maria is generally flat, however, it is becoming hilly towards the north. This area covers the barangays of Silangan, Mag-asawang Sapa, Pulong Buhangin and some parts of Balasing with landscape ranging from 8 to 18 percent slope. The rest of the barangays have a slope range from level to undulating.

Most of the barangays in the municipality of Santa Maria have low susceptibility to flooding. Those with portion with moderate to high susceptibility to flooding are located along the Santa Maria River and near or adjacent to creeks that are tributaries of the Santa Maria River.

There are 18 barangays with low susceptibility to flooding in the municipality (Manggahan, Santa Cruz, Cay Pombo, Caysio, Pulong Buhangin, Mag-asawang Sapa, Silangan, Balasing, Parada, Tumana, Mahabang Parang, Bulac, Catmon, San Vicente, Camangyanan, Tabing Bakod, Buenavista and San Gabriel). The barangay centers and populated areas in the barangays have low susceptibility to flooding. The portions of the barangays usually inundated are the generally low-lying areas and catchment areas of the barangays and near active creeks and rivers.

Historically, Santa Maria belonged to the Fourth Legislative District of Bulacan from the ratification of the 1987 Constitution until the congressional reapportionment enacted through Republic Act No. 11546. Prior to the reapportionment, the district consisted of Santa Maria, Marilao, Meycauayan, and Obando. With the establishment of the Sixth Legislative District, Santa Maria was grouped with the municipalities of Angat and Norzagaray, thereby forming a new congressional district designed to enhance legislative representation and accommodate the province's growing population. The new district was first represented in the House of Representatives following the 2022 national and local elections.

=== Land use ===
Basically agricultural, about 29.02 square kilometres (11.20 sq mi) or 30.54% of the town's land area is devoted to crop production. Approximately 26.66 square kilometres (10.29 sq mi) of riceland in Santa Maria are rain-fed and 2.36 square kilometres (0.91 sq mi) are irrigated. An area of 32.74 square kilometres (12.64 sq mi) are classified as non-productive agricultural area or open grasslands.

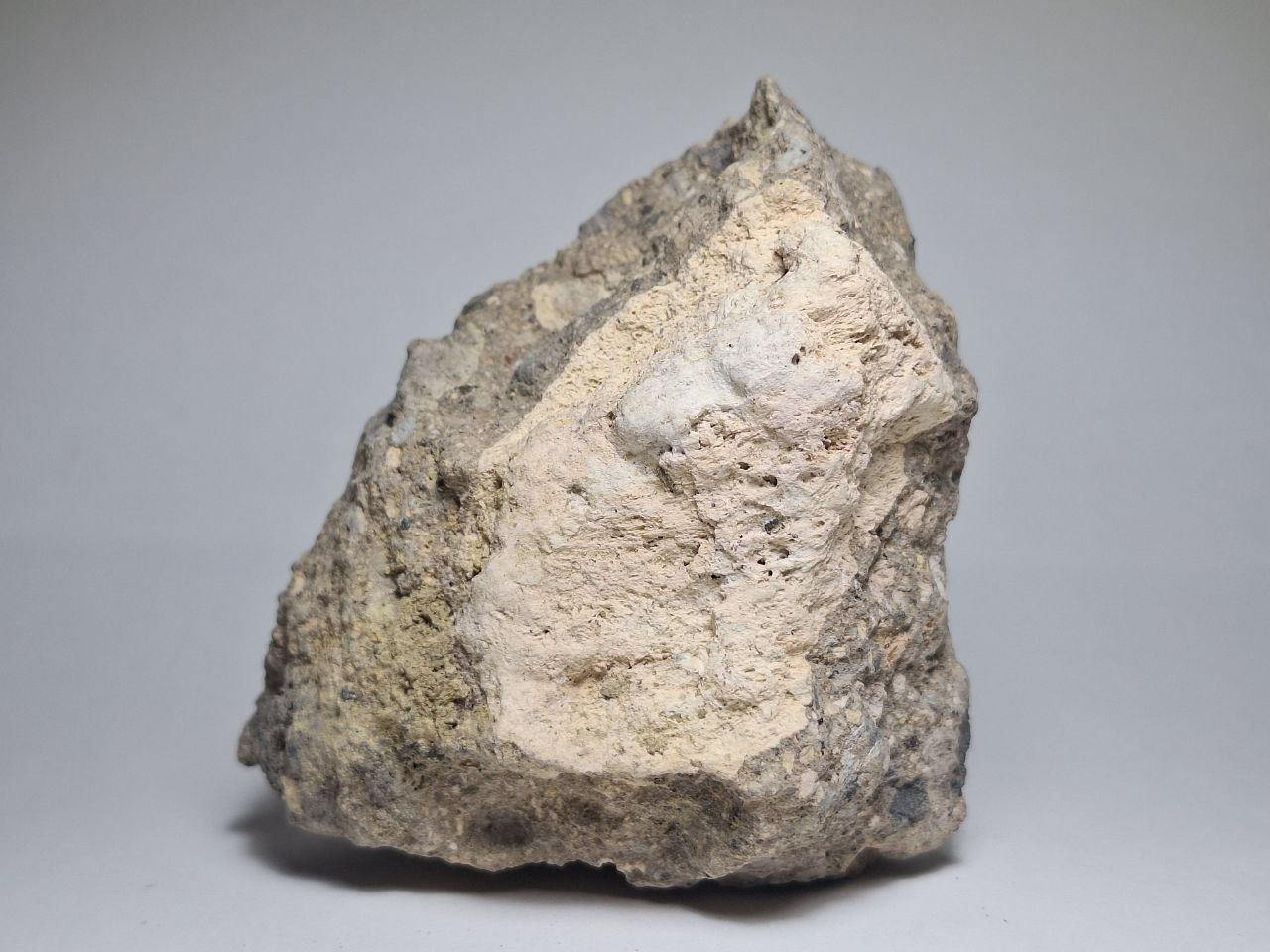
Volcanic tuff from Caysio, Santa Maria, Bulacan

=== Natural resources ===
Santa Maria, Bulacan, has abundant natural resources. It is renowned for its extensive deposits of gravel, sand, and volcanic tuff/ignimbrite (commonly known as adobe, lastillas, or escombro). Quarrying has become a significant means of living for the local population, where the abundant pyroclastic deposits from the Guadalupe Formation, such as tuff and ignimbrite in Santa Maria, are quarried for construction and decorative purposes.These valuable resources are indispensable in numerous sectors, such as construction, infrastructure development, and artistic pursuits.

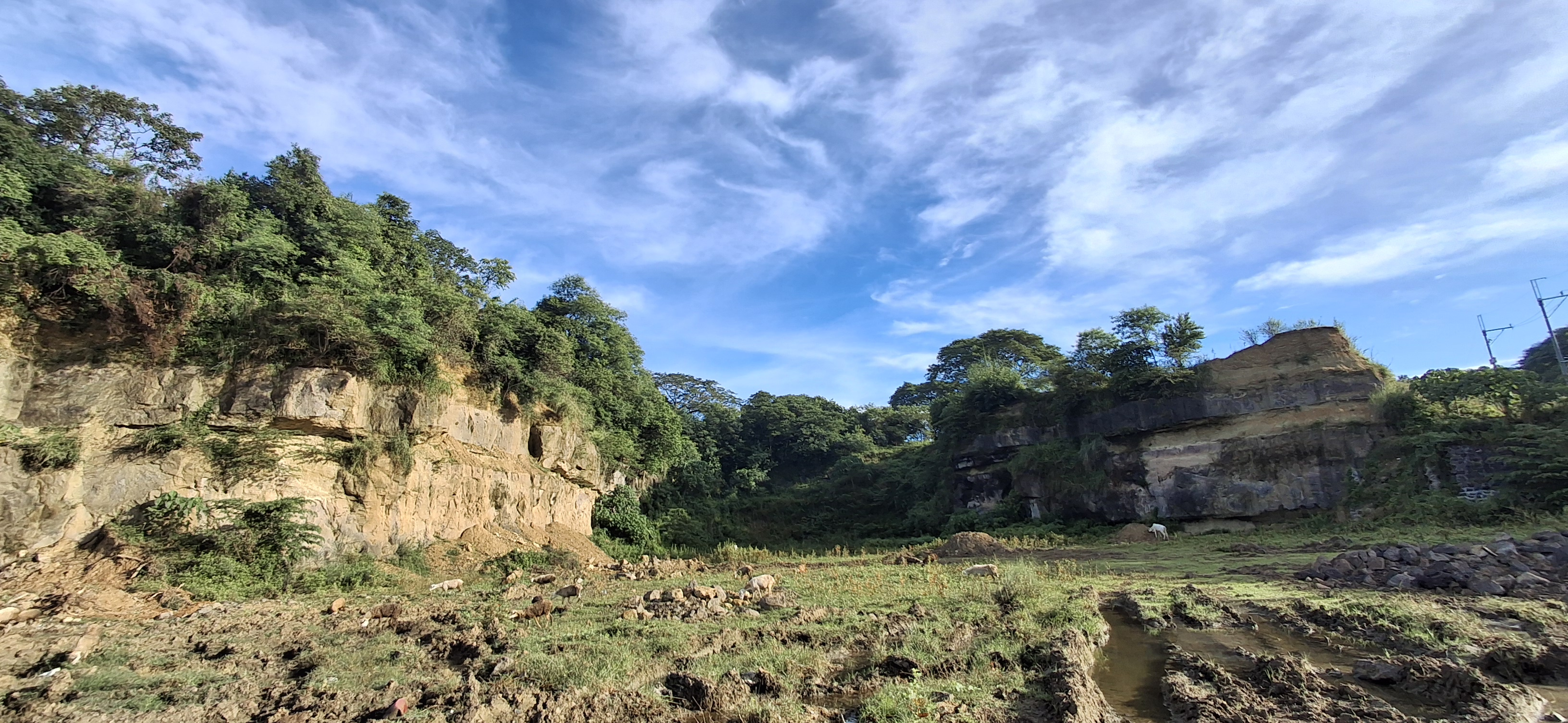
The rocky outcrop of the Guadalupe formation exposed in a quarry at Tibagan, Caypombo, Santa Maria, Bulacan.

=== Climate ===
Due to its location near Metro Manila, rainfall and climate in Santa Maria is almost similar to the country's capital Manila. The location of Santa Maria in the western side of the Philippines made Philippine Atmospheric, Geophysical and Astronomical Services Administration (PAG-ASA) to classify its weather scheme as Type I. Wind coming from the Pacific Ocean is generally blocked by the Sierra Madre mountain range, a few kilometers east of the municipality.

Its proximity to the equator tends to make its temperature to rise and fall into very small range: from as low as 19 °C (66 °F) to as high as 35 °C (95 °F). The Köppen climate system classifies Santa Maria climate as tropical monsoon (Am) due to its location and precipitation characteristics. This means that the municipality has two pronounced seasons: dry and wet seasons. The municipality's driest months are from November to April where it receives less than 60 millimetres (2.4 in) of rainfall. On the other hand, maximum rain period is from June to September where it receives not more than 600 millimetres (24 in) of rainfall. Hail and snow is not observed in the municipality.

Humidity levels are usually high in the morning, especially during June to November, which makes it feel warmer. Lowest humidity levels are recorded in the evening during wet season. Discomfort from heat and humidity is extreme during May and June, otherwise it is higher compared to other places in the country. Average sunlight is maximum at 254.25 hours during April and minimum at 113 hours during July, August and September.

Climate data for Santa Maria, Bulacan
Month	Jan	Feb	Mar	Apr	May	Jun	Jul	Aug	Sep	Oct	Nov	Dec	Year
Mean daily maximum °C (°F)	29 (84)	30 (86)	32 (90)	34 (93)	33 (91)	31 (88)	30 (86)	29 (84)	29 (84)	30 (86)	30 (86)	29 (84)	31 (87)
Mean daily minimum °C (°F)	20 (68)	20 (68)	21 (70)	23 (73)	24 (75)	25 (77)	24 (75)	24 (75)	24 (75)	23 (73)	22 (72)	21 (70)	23 (73)
Average precipitation mm (inches)	7 (0.3)	7 (0.3)	9 (0.4)	21 (0.8)	101 (4.0)	152 (6.0)	188 (7.4)	170 (6.7)	159 (6.3)	115 (4.5)	47 (1.9)	29 (1.1)	1,005 (39.7)
Average rainy days	3.3	3.5	11.1	8.1	18.9	23.5	26.4	25.5	24.5	19.6	10.4	6.4	181.2
Source: Meteoblue

=== Barangays ===
Political map of Santa Maria.

Santa Maria is politically subdivided into 24 barangays, as shown in the matrix below. Each barangay consists of puroks and some have sitios.

Barangays	District	Population (2024)	Area (km^{2})	Density (/km^{2})
Bagbaguin	Downtown	7,614	7.6358	1,026.61
Balasing	North	10,505	6.3713	1,527.47
Buenavista	South	2,979	2.4647	1,144.56
Bulac	East	17,622	5.2009	1,925.63
Camangyanan	South	6,563	2.4761	2,026.98
Catmon	East	19,075	8.2860	1,923.49
Cay Pombo	North	34,388	4.1626	7,849.42
Caysio	West	15,539	3.1198	4,801.27
Guyong	West	17,779	3.6191	4,672.16
Lalakhan	West	2,444	0.3354	6,914.13
Mag-asawang Sapa	North	10,617	1.1327	9,164.83
Mahabang Parang	South	5,211	1.0466	4,911.14
Manggahan	West	2,947	1.6386	1,695.96
Parada	East	9,799	4.0669	2,316.01
Población	Downtown	12,811	2.8032	4,591.54
Pulong Buhangin	North	43,186	14.3817	2,866.00
San Gabriel	South	10,453	3.6787	2,617.77
San Jose Patag	West	15,391	2.5218	5,545.64
San Vicente	East	33,691	7.2537	3,370.83
Sta. Clara	Downtown	12,692	2.1470	5,784.35
Sta. Cruz	West	12,211	2.2705	5,005.06
Silangan	North	2,169	0.9387	2,239.27
Tabing Bakod	South	5,719	1.2530	4,317.64
Tumana	South	11,120	2.1202	4,908.03

== Demographics ==
Population census of Santa Maria
Year	Pop.	±% p.a.
1903	10,791	—
1918	12,174	+0.81%
1939	14,987	+0.99%
1948	17,509	+1.74%
1960	26,341	+3.46%
1970	36,369	+3.27%
1975	45,615	+4.65%
1980	58,748	+5.19%
1990	91,468	+4.53%
1995	101,071	+1.89%
2000	144,282	+7.93%
2007	205,258	+4.98%
2010	218,351	+2.28%
2015	256,454	+3.11%
2020	289,820	+2.61%
2024	322,525	+2.60%
Source: Philippine Statistics Authority

In the 2020 census, the population of Santa Maria, Bulacan, was 289,820 people, with a density of 3,200 inhabitants per square kilometre or 8,300 inhabitants per square mile. It is the largest among the municipalities in the Central Luzon Region in terms of population.

Among the 24 barangays comprising the municipality, barangay Pulong Buhangin was the leading barangay in terms of population size with 43,186 persons. Barangay Pulong Buhangin is the ninth most populous barangay in the entire province of Bulacan.

=== Religion ===
The majority of the population are Christians. Roman Catholicism is the dominant religion with 91% of the populace professed themselves as Roman Catholics. The Vicariate of Santa Maria, under the Roman Catholic Diocese of Malolos, comprises nine parishes that serve the spiritual and pastoral needs of the municipality’s Catholic faithful. These parishes are strategically located across different barangays to ensure accessible religious services, sacramental celebrations, and community-based pastoral programs. The nine parishes are as follows:

1.) Minor Basilica and Parish of La Purísima Concepción – Poblacion 2.) Our Lady of Mount Carmel Parish – Pulong Buhangin 3.) Santo Niño Parish – Parada 4.) St. Gabriel the Archangel Parish – San Gabriel 5.) Holy Family Parish – Catmon 6.) St. John the Apostle and Evangelist Parish – Bagbaguin 7.) Blessed Sacrament Parish – Cay Pombo 8.) Parish and Diocesan Shrine of Mary, Mother of the Eucharist and Grace – San Vicente 9.) San Isidro Labrador Parish – Partida, Pulong Buhangin

Other religious groups with strong presence in the municipality are the following: Members Church of God International, Iglesia ni Cristo, United Methodist Church, The Church of God, Jehovah's Witness, Jesus Is Lord Church and other evangelical or "born-again" groups, Pentecostal, Islam, and others.

The Members Church of God International, or popularly known as Ang Dating Daan, has multiple coordinating centers or locales in the municipality, namely: Poblacion, Balasing (located in Pulong Buhangin near their border), Bulac, Cay Pombo, Caysio, Gardenville (Pulong Buhangin), and Parada. Although a locale is named after a barangay, members come from the barangay itself and neighboring barangays. For example, the locale of Bulac has members from nearby Catmon and Sapang Palay Proper (San Jose Del Monte City).

UNTV Public Service channel and Members Church of God International has provided many public service activities to Santa Maria such as tree planting, blood letting, free medical missions and free legal consultations. Thousands of residents have benefited from the charity events.

=== Residential ===
There are about 45 subdivisions in the municipality of low, medium and high density category. The existing residential hub occupies 1,360 hectares (13.60 km^{2}) of land distributed unevenly in its 12 barangays. These subdivisions used to occupy the stretch of the roads but now they are now developing the inner portions of their barangays. It is expected that within the next ten years, land use development in Santa Maria will represent the sub-urban mix which means that the government will provide development where the level of accessibility is very high. This will provide for the clustering of lower density land uses to help meet housing, employment and public services needs of the people.

== Economy ==
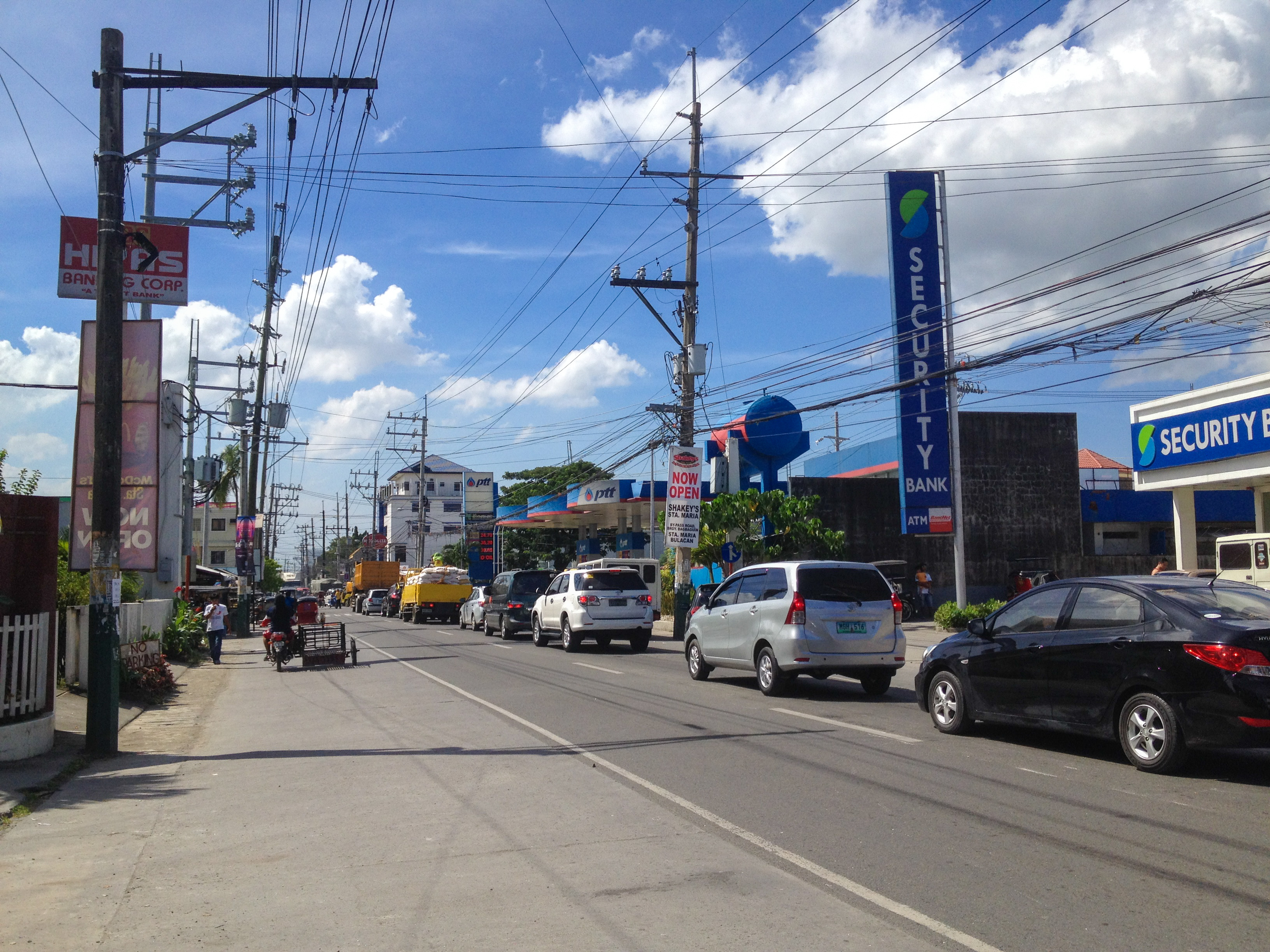
Governor Fortunato F. Halili Avenue in Bagbaguin is the busiest highway in the municipality.

Poverty incidence of Santa Maria (%)

Source: Philippine Statistics Authority

Santa Maria is one of the municipalities in Bulacan with a high population growth rate due to in migration. Its rapid population growth contributes largely to the establishment of more commercial and trading activities as some people see this as an opportunity for business. Industries in Santa Maria include agribusiness, food processing, cottage making, banking, fireworks making, rubber, and textile making.

The public market at Poblacion and the private market in Pulong Buhangin are the major areas for the exchange of goods and services.

On March 3, 2003, President Gloria Macapagal Arroyo issued Presidential Proclamation No. 337 designating the Santa María Industrial Park as a Special Economic Zone (Ecozone).

There are 28 pyrotechnics manufacturers, 5 textile, 87 garment factories, and 9 rubber industries operating in the municipality.

In the Cities and Municipalities Competitive Index 2022 Rankings, the Municipality of Santa Maria was ranked No. 5 for economic dynamism and No. 9 for infrastructure.

=== Agriculture ===
Rice, orchard products, corn, vegetables, hogs, cattle, and poultry, and freshwater fish are the major agricultural products of the municipality.

=== Food processing ===
There are about 36 food processing establishments in Santa María.

=== Agro-industrial sector ===
Industrial activities in Santa María are mostly agro-based. For the past two decades, there has been a great boom in its poultry and hog raising industries. Presently, there are around more than 150 poultry and piggery farms.

The boost in agri-business necessitated the establishment of feed mills and feed trading centres. There are eight commercial feed mills and 15 feed trading centres operating in the town.

There are 20 rice mills in Santa María that accommodate the milling and storage needs of the farmers for their palay harvest.

=== Cottage industry ===
There are 10 furniture-making establishments in the town.

=== Commerce ===
Santa Maria has one public wet and dry market, the Pamilihang Bayan ng Santa Maria, in Poblacion and several private wet and dry markets (one each in Cay Pombo and in Pulong Buhangin).

The mall has a supermarket, kiosks, a department store, school and office supplies store, bookstore, drugstore, 3 cinemas, hardware, and several restaurants. Convenience stores can also be found in the neighborhoods of the municipality.

== Government ==
=== Local government ===
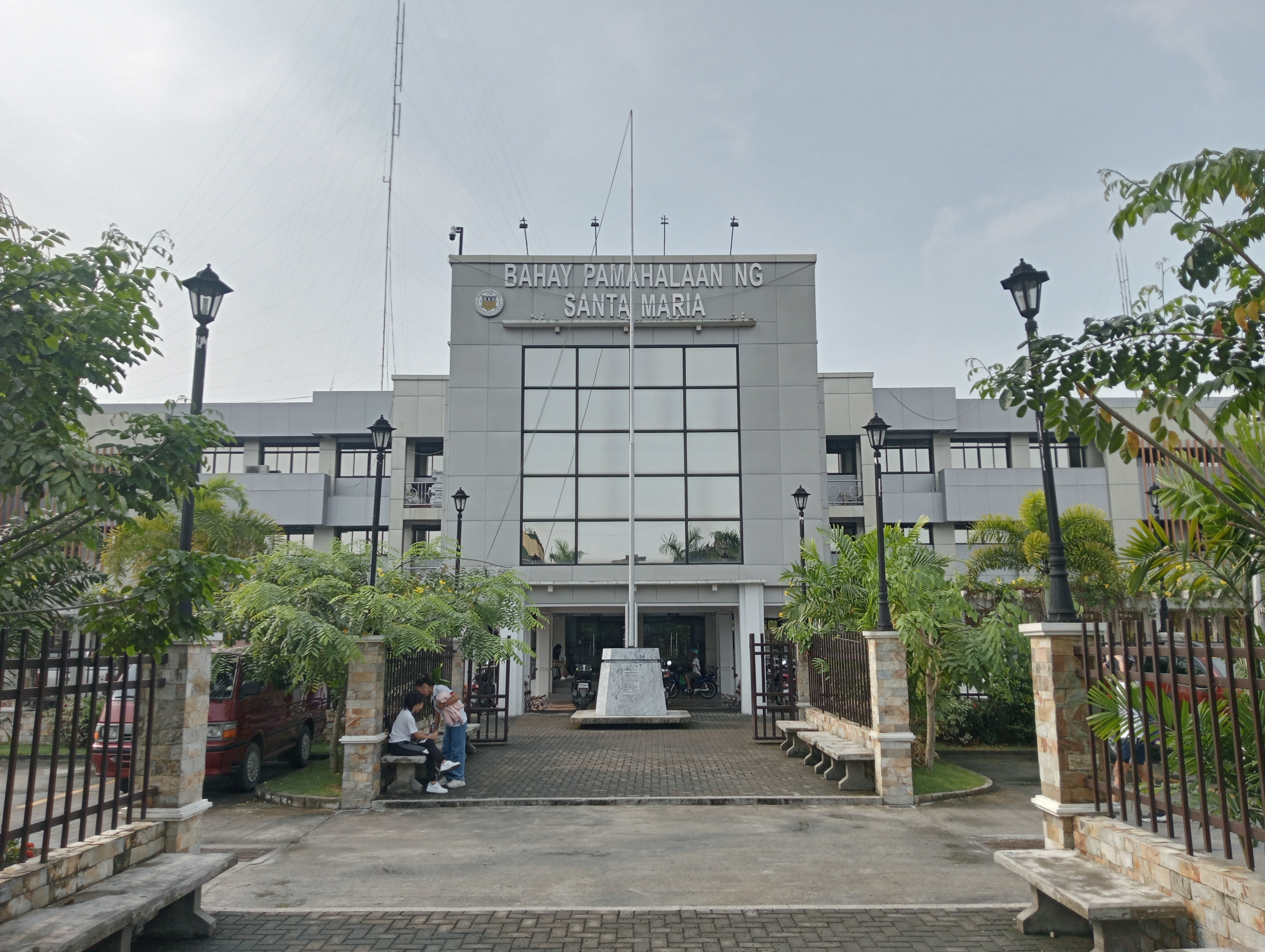
Municipal hall

Like other municipalities in the Philippines, Santa Maria is governed by a mayor and vice mayor who are elected to three-year terms. The mayor is the executive head who leads the municipality's departments in the implementation of municipal ordinances and in the delivery of public services. The vice mayor heads a legislative council that is composed of 10 members: 8 councilors and two ex-officio officers: one for the Sangguniang Kabataan Federation President, representing the youth sector, and one for the Association of Barangay Chairmen President as the barangay sectoral representative. The council is in charge of creating the municipality's policies in the form of ordinances and resolutions.

Santa Maria is part of the 6th District of Bulacan.

=== Elected officials ===
Members of the Santa Maria Municipal Council (2025-2028)
Position	Name	Party
Mayor	Bartolome R. Ramos	Lakas
Vice Mayor	Roberto B. Perez	PFP
Councilors	Angelito C. Jacinto	Lakas
Councilors	Froilan C. Caguiat	PFP
Councilors	Mark Angelo R. Clemente	Lakas
Councilors	Eresto S. Dela Cruz	Lakas
Councilors	Neil B. Mateo	Lakas
Councilors	Carl G. Castillo	Lakas
Councilors	Esperanza G. Ramos	Lakas
Councilors	Rico Jude P. Sto. Domingo	Lakas
Ex Officio Municipal Council Members
ABC President		Nonpartisan
SK Federation President		Nonpartisan

=== List of chief executives ===
No.	Presidente Municipal	Took office	Left office
1	Maximo Evidente	1899	1900
2	Teodoro Geronimo	1900	1901
3	Maximo de Jesus	1901	1903
4	Pedro Gallardo	1903	1906
5	Juan Mendoza	1906	1910
6	Marciano de Leon	1910	1912
7	Bonifacio Morales	1912	1916
8	Antonio Rodriguez	1916	1919
9	Mariano Santiago	1919	1922
10	Cipriano de Guzman	1922	1928
11	Agustin Morales	1928	1934
12	Fortunato F. Halili	1934	1937
No.	Alcalde	Took office	Left office
1	Pedro J. Mansilla	1938	1940
2	Dr. Teofilo S. Santiago	1941	1945
3	Ireneo Hermogenes	1945	1945
4	Marciano Bautista	1946	1947
No.	Municipal Mayors	Took office	Left office
1	Conrado H. Ignacio	1947	1955
2	Ricardo G. Nicolas, Sr.	1956	1959
3	Eriberto R. Ramos	1960	1963
4	Ricardo G. Nicolas, Sr.	1964	1967
5	Paulino Luciano, Sr.	1968	1971
6	Ricardo D. Nicolas, Jr.	1972	1978
7	Paulino A. Luciano, Jr.	1978	1986
8	Dr. Alfredo M. Perez (OIC)	1986	1986
9	Ricardo D. Nicolas, Jr. (OIC)	1986	1986
10	Benjamin I. Geronimo (OIC)	1987	1988
11	Atty. Ramon H. Clemente (OIC)	1988	1988
12	Eriberto R. Ramos	1988	1992
13	Reylina G. Nicolas	1992	2001
14	Bartolome R. Ramos	2001	2004
15	Jesus R. Mateo	2004	2007
16	Bartolome R. Ramos	2007	2016
17	Russel G. Pleyto	2016	2022
18	Bartolome R. Ramos	2022	incumbent

== Tourism ==
Wave pool at 4K Resort in Catmon

Santa Maria is home to ten resorts located in barangays Pulong Buhangin, Balasing, Catmon, Bulac, Mahabang Parang, Tumana and Lalakhan. These resorts have become the main destinations of the residents from Metro Manila and Santa Maria's nearby towns for their leisure and summer experience. Facilities like swimming pools, convention/seminar rooms, hotel, cottages, and spacious parking spaces that could accommodate fifty buses at a time equipped these resorts. Some resorts accommodate local and foreign tourist for live-in accommodations.

In 2005, over 138,000 tourists visited the resorts in Santa Maria. Sitio Lucia Resort situated in Pulong Buhangin attracted 36 percent of the total volume of resort visitors. 4K Garden Resort of Barangay Catmon came next with 29 percent share. The Summer Resort in Barangay Mahabang Parang settled at the bottom with 2 percent contribution.

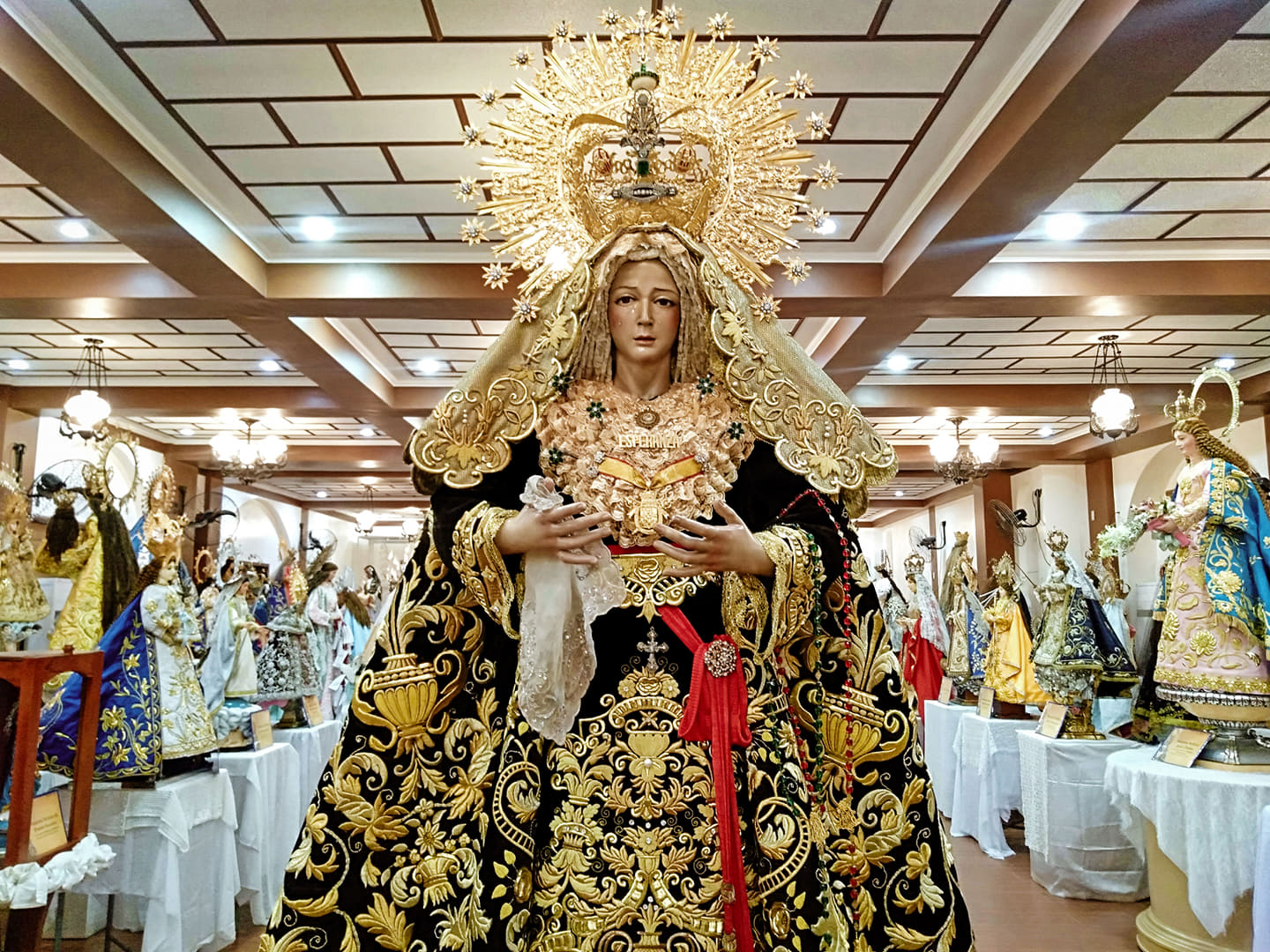
Grand Marian Exhibit in La Purísima Concepción Parish Church

=== Historical places ===
- La Purísima Concepción Parish Church
- Huseng Batute Marker
- Francisco Santiago Marker

=== Festivals ===
The town fiesta of Santa Maria in honor of its Patroness, the Purisima Concepcion is a month-long celebration in February which clearly shows the Marian devotion of the town. The movable feast is held on the Thursday after February 2 which tradition refers to as La Candelaria. It is preceded by the traditional novena of Masses before the feast and High Masses and processions on the Sundays of the month.

Throughout the month several other events are held such as musical variety shows led by popular personalities, outdoor sports exhibitions of nationally acclaimed players, concerts by well known bands and cultural shows.

Most notable during the month of February is the availability of "Tuge", a ready to eat root crop sold by vendors that signify the ambiance of the festivity together with the cool breeze which last right after the celebration of the town fiesta.

The joyous celebration of February takes on a somber mood as the liturgical calendar moves on to Cuaresma or Lent.

Apparently, the devotion was brought by the Franciscans who evangelized the town where the principal celebrations before the War was celebrated at the Lourdes Church which was then in Intramuros. Lost during the War, it was revived by the Hermandad y Cofradia de la Sagrada Pasion y de Maria Santisima de la Esperanza, a confraternity organized in 1999 to spearhead the revival and promotion of the Lenten traditions of Santa Maria from the Jubilee Year 2000 onwards. Incidentally, the Hermandad de la Sagrada Pasion has been an affiliate of the Hermandad de la Macarena in Seville, Spain since 2008 making it the twenty first confraternity to be recognized, the second outside of Spain and the first in Asia.

=== Sports and recreation ===
The Philippine Arena is a multi-purpose indoor arena at Ciudad de Victoria, a 75-hectare tourism enterprise zone located in the towns of Santa Maria and Bocaue, Bulacan. With a capacity of up to 55,000, it was the centerpiece of the Iglesia ni Cristo's (INC) centennial, which was celebrated on July 27, 2014.

Sports and recreation activities in the locality are usually basketball, softball, bowling, badminton, tennis and chess. The most common sports and recreational facilities in the town are basketball courts located in school compounds and in other part of 24 barangays. These courts also serve as multi-purpose pavements. A tennis court and a gymnasium named after the late Ricardo D. Nicolas, Jr. was constructed at the FFHNAS campus in Barangay Guyong. There are also two badminton courts in the town.

== Infrastructure ==
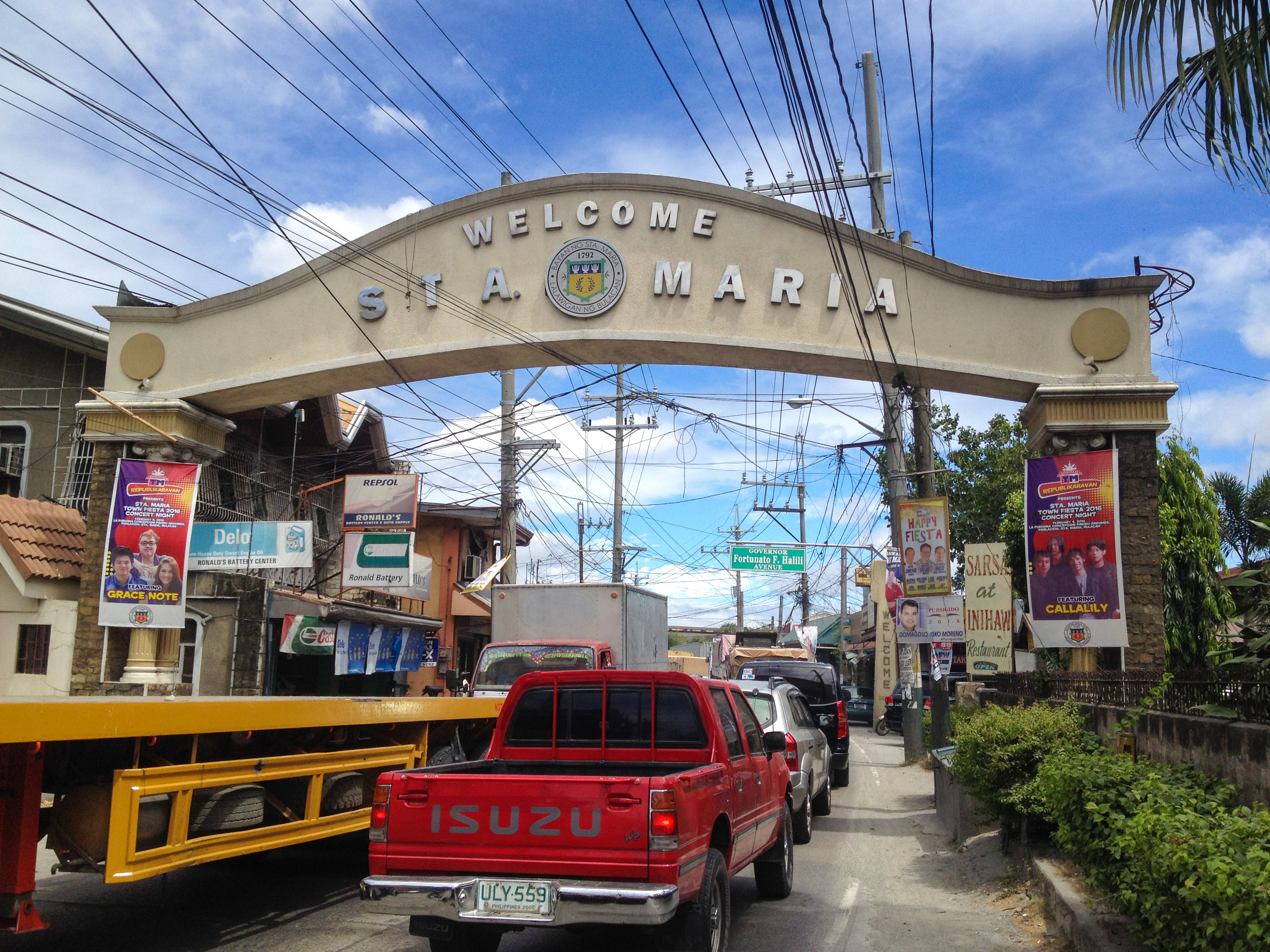
Santa Maria Welcome Arch

=== Bridges ===
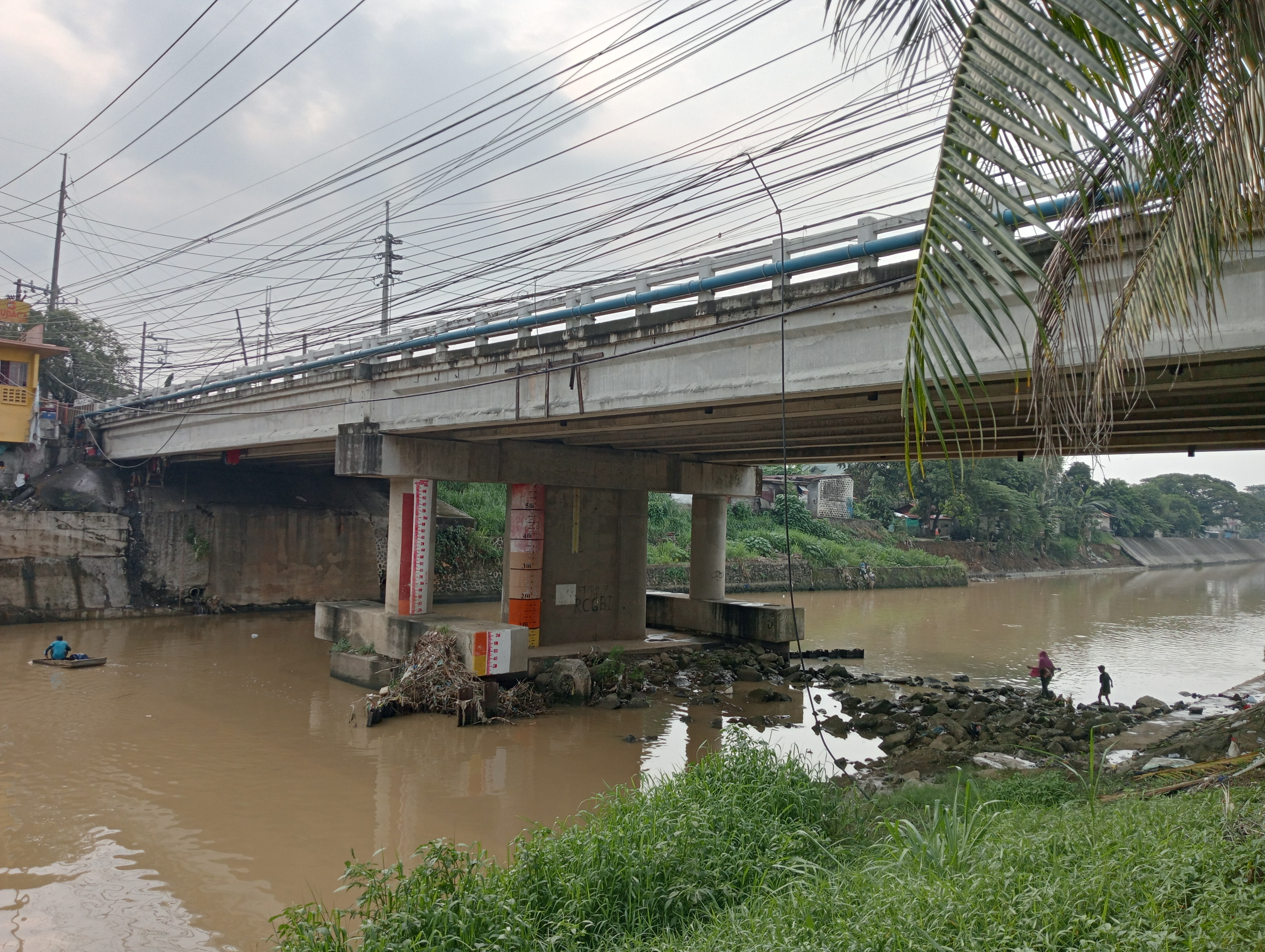
Santa Maria Bridge

As of 2004, Santa Maria has a network of ten bridges passing rivers and other waterways of the town. All are made of reinforced concrete design girders which are in good condition and passable.

=== Communications ===
Communication facilities in Santa Maria are provided by government telegraph (BUTEL), postal system, the Philippine Long Distance and Telephone Company (PLDT), Radio City Telephone Company (RACITELCOM), Digitel telephone Company, Converge ICT, the three major cellular companies (Smart Communications, Globe Telecom, Dito Telecommunity) and two MVNO: (Talk N' Text, Sun Cellular and Touch Mobile).

=== Water ===
Water supply is provided by LWUA (Local Water Utilities Administration) through the Santa Maria Water District.

=== Electricity ===
The Manila Electric Company (Meralco) is the sole electric distributor in Santa Maria.

== Basic services ==
=== Health ===
Santa Maria has one government-run hospital and seven private hospitals.

=== Animal health ===
Santa Maria also have veterinary clinics and an animal pet corner center.

These veterinary clinics handle farm animals and pets. Services range from simple to major surgeries, microchip implantation, vaccinations, laboratory works, confinements, emergency cases, and grooming.

=== Peace and order ===
Santa Maria is generally peaceful being served by 51 policemen and 15 firemen. The backlog of manpower requirement is complemented with 480 barangay tanods coming from 24 barangays. Crime incidence is low with 37 cases reported and 33 case were solve resulting to 89.19% crime solution efficiency.

== Education ==
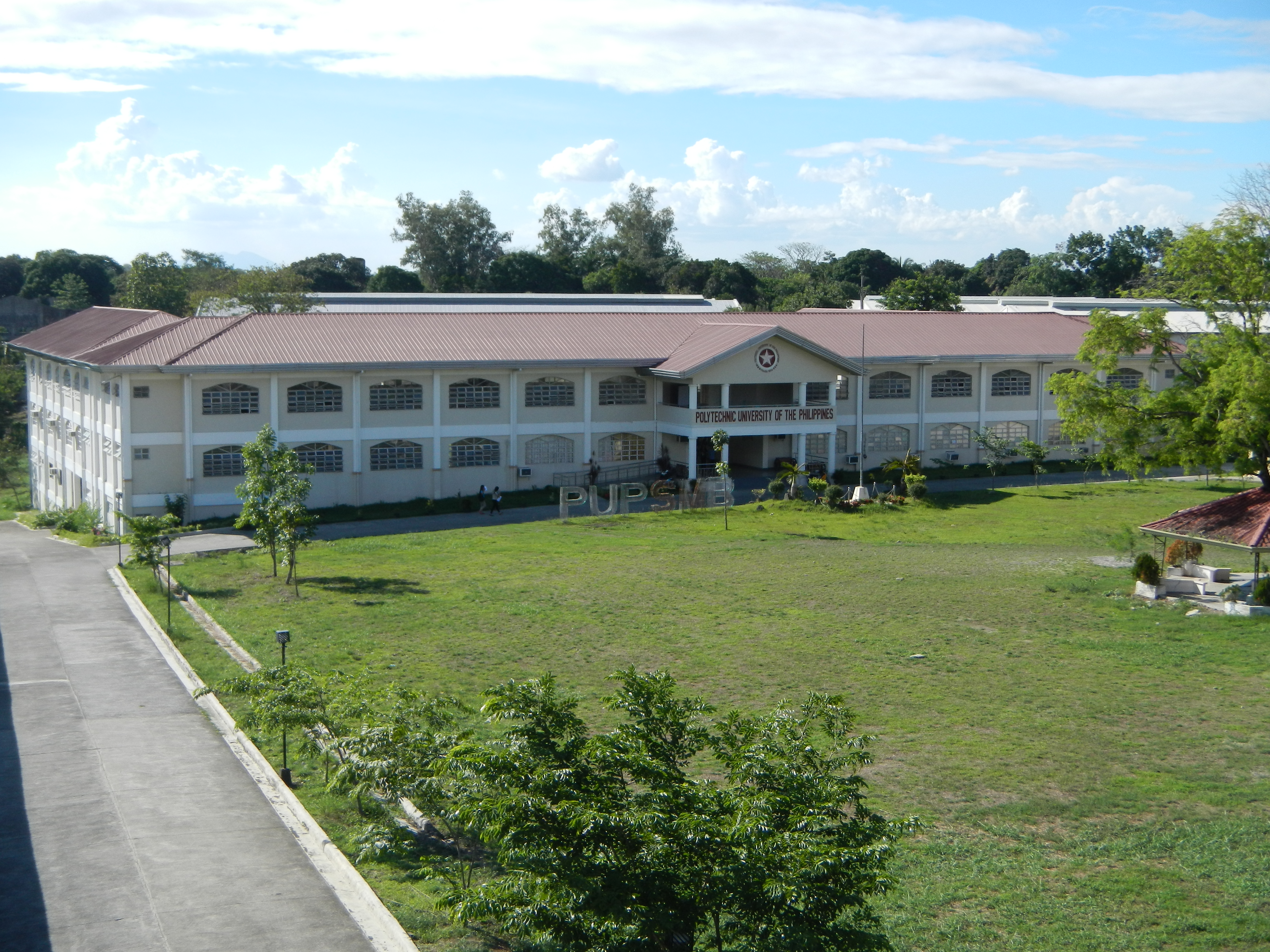
The Santa Maria extension campus of the Polytechnic University of the Philippines

The Sta. Maria Schools District Office governs all educational institutions within the municipality. It oversees the management and operations of all private and public, from primary to secondary schools.

=== Primary and elementary schools ===
- Angel John Integrated Academy
- Aquinas De Escolar Academy
- Bagbaguin Elementary School
- Balasing Elementary School
- Bagong Barrio Elementary School
- Bethsaidas' Special Children Foundation
- Buenasher Learning Academy
- Buenavista Elementary School
- Cornelia M. de Jesus Memorial Central School
- Camatchile Elementary School
- Camangyanan Elementary School
- Casa di Bambini European School
- Cay Pombo Elementary School
- Caysio Elementary School
- Channel of Dreams Christian Academy
- Christ Jezus Montessori School
- Christ's Ark Universal School
- Darwin International School
- Darwin International School - Bagbaguin
- E.D.G.E. Learning Center Inc.
- Escuela de Sacro Bambino
- Estrella Academy of Sta. Clara
- Faithful Child Christian Academy
- Galilee Grace Christian Academy
- Garden Village Elementary School
- Gloria Marizz Academy
- Golden Values Academy
- Global Seed Science School
- Grace Christian Academy
- Grace of Shekinah School
- Guyong Elementary School
- Holy Child of Montessori School
- Immaculate Conception Polytechnic
- Immaculate Heart of Mary Integrated School
- Immaculate Conception Academy
- John Wesley's Christian School
- Jose Juan Serapio Elementary School
- Joseph Arimathea Learning Center
- Kaylawig Elementary School
- Lalakhan Elementary School
- Le Athenaeum Montessori
- Liceo di San Lorenzo
- Lyceum of Sta. Maria
- Mahabang Parang Elementary School
- Mag-asawang Sapa Elementary School
- Manggahan Elementary School
- Mater Dei Academy
- Miguel M. Cruz Memorial School
- Mother of Eucharist and Grace Academy
- Mystical Rose School
- Nuestra Señora del Carmen Institute
- Parada Elementary School
- Perez Elementary School
- Pila Elementary School
- Sacred Heart Academy
- Saint Thomas Development Academy
- San Gabriel Elementary School
- San Isidro Labrador Academy
- San Jose Patag Elementary School
- San Vicente (Hulo) Elementary School
- San Vicente Elementary School
- School of St. Bartholomew of Bulacan
- Silangan Elementary School
- Sir Armand Learning Center
- Smarties Academy of Sta. Maria
- SOL Maria de Cay Pombo Child Care and Development Center
- St. Cleofe Learning Center
- St. Dominic De Guzman School
- St. Mary Village Elementary School
- St. Paul School of Sta. Maria
- St. Rose of Lima Academy
- St. Thomas School of Cay Pombo
- St. Vincent Learning Academy
- Sta. Clara Elementary School
- Sta. Cruz Elementary School
- Sta. Maria Ecumenical School
- Sta. Maria Elementary School
- Tabing Bakod Elementary School
- Trinitas School
- Tumana Elementary School
- Virgo Carmeli Academy
- Viva School
- Youngpro Learning Center

=== Secondary schools ===
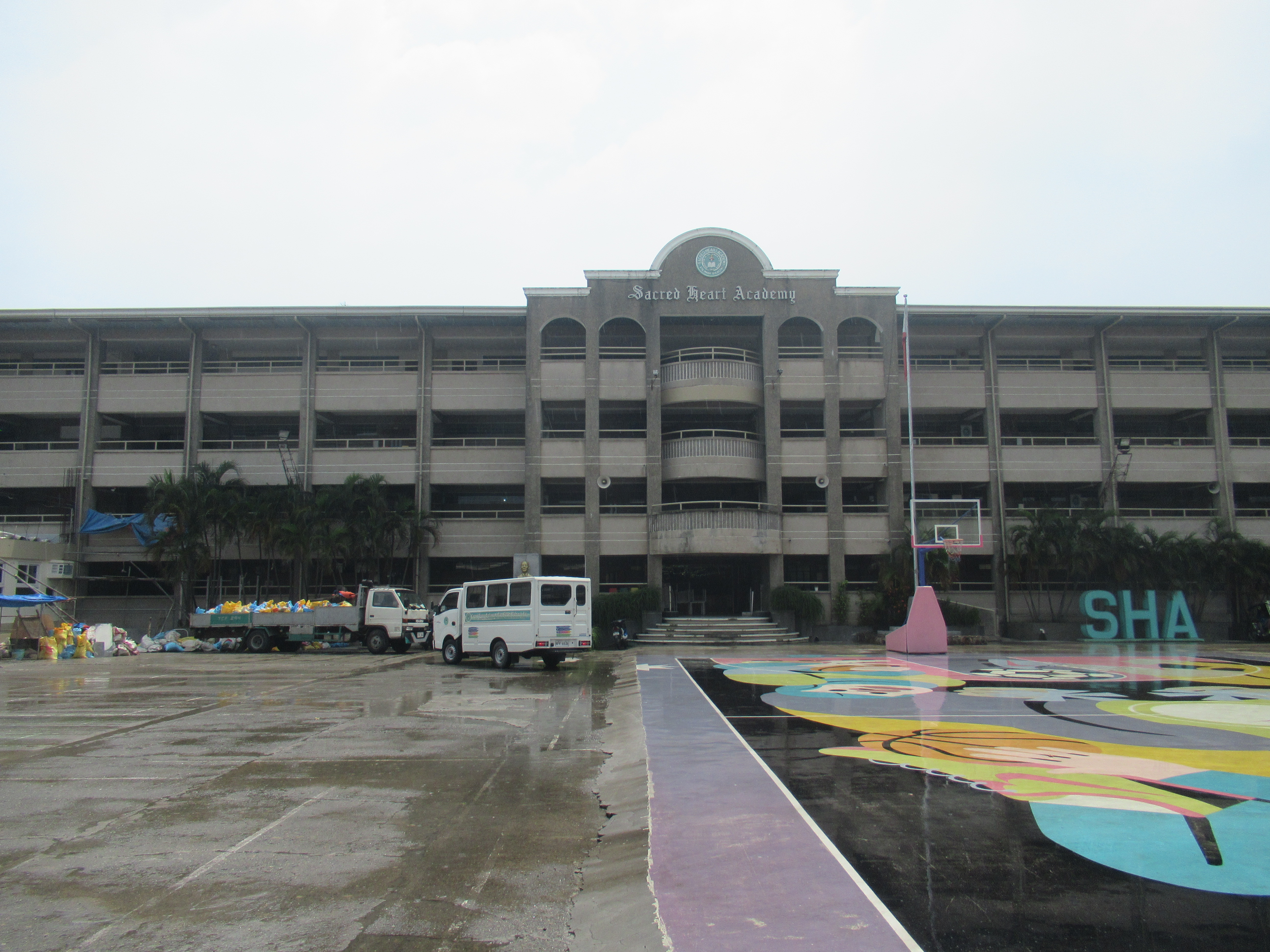
Façade of Sacred Heart Academy of Santa Maria Bulacan in 2023

- Catmon National High School
- F. F. Halili National Agricultural School
- F. F. Halili National Agricultural School Annex
- Fortunato F. Halili National Agricultural School
- Parada National High School
- Pulong Buhangin National High School
- Sacred Heart Academy of Santa Maria Bulacan
- San Gabriel National High School
- Sta. Cruz High School
- Sta. Maria National High School

=== Higher educational institutions ===
- Cebu Sacred Heart College
- Early Christian College of Arts and Technology
- Golden Minds Colleges
- Jesus Lord & Savior Christian Colleges Foundation
- Komenski College
- Polytechnic University of the Philippines
- St. Joseph College of Bulacan
- Saint Jude Thaddeus College

== Notable people ==
- José Corazón de Jesús (1896–1932), Huseng Batute – Filipino poet
- Francisco Santiago (1889–1947), Ama ng Kundiman
- Larry Montes (1911–1996), professional golfer
- Krystal Reyes (born 1996), A child actress
- Angel Locsin (born 1985), actress, commercial model and host
- Alfred Vargas (born 1979), actor
- Maine Mendoza (born 1995), also known as "Yaya Dub" and one of the co-hosts of Eat Bulaga!

== Sister cities ==
Santa Maria is twinned with:

- Milton, Ontario, Canada (since July 6, 1999)

== See also ==
- Fortunato F. Halili Avenue
- Legislative districts of Bulacan
