= Mount Carmel College of Baler =

Roman Catholic mission school in Aurora, Philippines

- Kolehiyong Monte Carmelo ng Baler (Filipino)
- Other names: MCC Baler; MCCB
- Former names: Mount Carmel High School of Baler (1948–1961)
- Motto: Zelo zelatus sum pro Domino Deo exercituum.
- Motto in English: "With zeal have I been zealous for the Lord God of hosts."
- Type: Private, Catholic
- Established: 1948
- Religious affiliation: Order of Discalced Carmelites (OCD) (Roman Catholic) (1948–1982); Franciscan Sisters of the Immaculate Conception (SFIC) (Roman Catholic) (1982–present)
- Academic affiliations: Philippine Accrediting Association of Schools, Colleges and Universities (PAASCU), Catholic Educational Association of the Philippines (CEAP), Catholic Association of Schools in the Prelature of Infanta (CASPI)
- President: Most Rev. Dave D. Capucao, D.D.
- Executive vice president: Rev. Fr. John Anthony C. Losbañes, Ed.D, (Executive Vice President)
- Location: Baler, Aurora, Philippines; 15°46′11″N 121°35′25″E
- Campus: Main campus: Rizal St., Brgy. 04 (Poblacion), Baler, 3200 Aurora Extension campus: Brgy. Pingit, Baler, 3200 Aurora
- Hymn: "Mount Carmel Hymn"
- Colors: Maroon, gold, & white
- Nickname: Carmelians

The Mount Carmel College of Baler, commonly referred to as MCC Baler or MCCB, is the oldest Catholic mission school in the Philippine province of Aurora. It was founded in 1948 by the American Carmelites, who arrived in Baler upon the invitation of Doña Aurora Aragon-Quezon (1888–1949), former First Lady of the Philippines (1935–1944), wife of the late Philippine Commonwealth President Manuel Luis Quezon, and upon the approval of Alfredo F. Versoza, then bishop of Lipa. It is currently a member of the Catholic Association of Schools in the Prelature of Infanta (CASPI).

== History ==
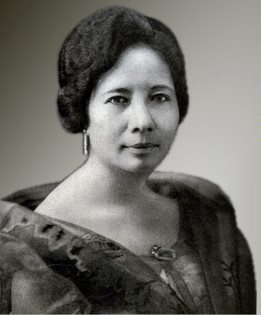
Doña Aurora Aragon-Quezon (1888–1949), former First Lady of the Philippines (1935–1944), invited the American Carmelites to set foot in Baler, where the latter eventually established a Catholic mission school.

=== 1940s–1960s ===
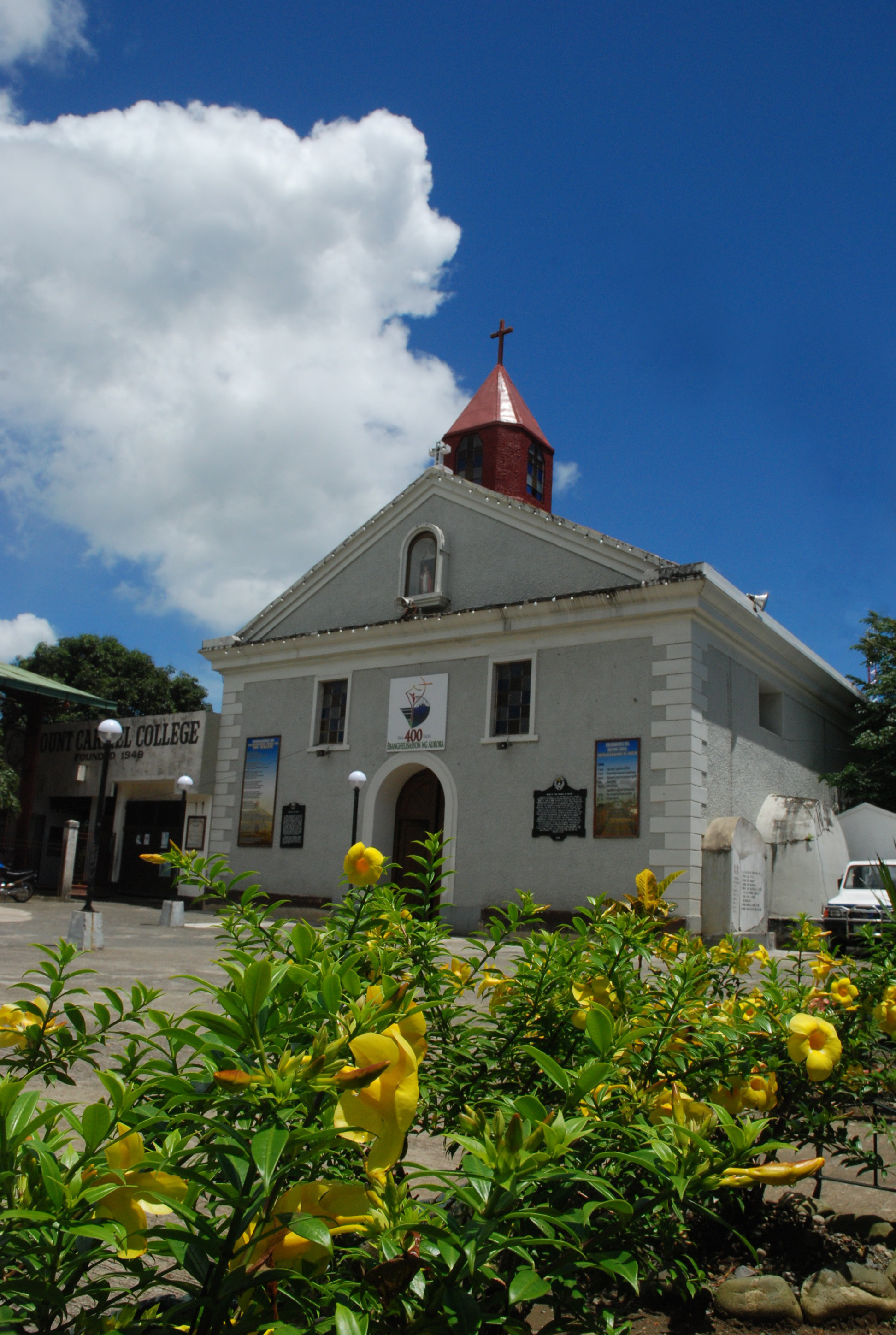
The San Luis Obispo de Tolosa Parish, the historic Baler Catholic church, by which the main campus of the Mount Carmel College of Baler (MCCB) stands.

Catholicism took a new life in Baler when three pioneering Discalced Carmelite (OCD) friars arrived in 1947 upon the invitation of Doña Aurora. Soon after, Mount Carmel High School of Baler (MCHS Baler), now known as Mount Carmel College of Baler (MCC Baler), was built near the San Luis Obispo de Tolosa Parish, the historic Baler Catholic Church, to fill the need for an evangelical mission in this town.

The school started its operation on June 23, 1948, with 96 students, six of whom were seniors who received their diplomas at the end of the school year. It was incorporated with the Securities and Exchange Commission (SEC) on August 9, 1951.

The grade school opened with 35 enrollees in 1956. Government recognition for the entire grade school department came in 1959.

The college department was opened on June 12, 1961, with one-year commercial science and liberal arts (AB) programs as main offerings, with Dr. José M. Manalo as the first college dean. Government recognition for the Bachelor of Science in Education (BSEd) and the Bachelor of Science in Elementary Education (BSEEd) programs came in 1962. The areas of specialization for Bachelor of Science in Education (BSEd) were given permit by the government in 1966.

Meanwhile, the 1960's saw the strengthening of Catholic education with the organizations of the Legion of Mary, the Solidarity of Our Lady, and the Catechists’ Club. The student aide education program was likewise introduced in the 1960s to help the financially poor but academically capable students finish college.

The Carmelite Missionary (CM) sisters arrived in August 1965 and assisted the Carmelite fathers in the school administration until 1982.

=== 1970s–1990s ===
Such programs as the Bachelor of Science in Commerce (BSC), with a major in economics, was offered in 1978, and BSC, with a major in accounting, in 1985, but the latter was phased out in 1993.

The 1970s, which marked the growth of social awareness, challenged the school to "direct its education for social justice and respect for the dignity of persons." The school thus defined its thrust towards the "formation of Christians who are witnesses to God’s love and are active participants in the improvement of life in the locality."

The school had a consortium with the Philippine Wesleyan College (PWC), now the Wesleyan University of the Philippines (WUP), from 1977 to 1981 for a graduate program in administration and supervision.

Upon the invitation of the Most Reverend Bp/ Julio Xavier Labayen, OCD, DD, bishop of the Prelature of Infanta, the Franciscan Sisters of the Immaculate Conception (SFIC) arrived in 1982. Since then, the school administration has been entrusted the formulation of the mission statement of Mount Carmel schools in the prelature.

The mission statement of the prelature necessitated the formulation of the mission statement of Carmel schools in the prelature, which could define the thrust to build the church of the poor. Thus, the school formulated its first mission statement in 1987 with its programs and activities geared toward holistic human formation of its academic community.

An agreement with Saint Joseph's College of Quezon City (SJCQC) for extension of classes in the masteral level for faculty upgrading took effect from 1987 to 1991.

The need for a more relevant and contextualized Christian formation program (CFP) was felt in 1990 which led to the setting up of the CFP Office headed by a coordinator.

For the first time, the school hosted the CASPI assembly on July 16, 1990, the day when the 1990 Luzon earthquake shook the province and other nearby provinces.

The research and development office (RDO) was set up in 1992 to conduct research and evaluation studies as baseline data for planning and decision-making. One of its first outputs was the review and reformulation of the 1987 mission statement of the school.

The first alumni homecoming was held on December 28, 1994, with approximately 500 attendees who were high school and college graduates.

Heads of Mount Carmel College of Baler
- Rev. Fr. Gabriel (Richard) Gates†, OCD, director, 1947–1951
- Rev. Fr. Leo McCrudden† (from Newfoundland, Canada), director (1947–1948), who died at Baler Bay on July 6, 1948, together with his companions, including Bro. Vincent Sheerer, in search and rescue of lost fishermen during a storm, the incident of their loss at sea for five days being detailed in the book A Man Shall Scatter by Sean Buckley
- Rev. Fr. Basil Nolan†, OCD, director, 1954–1955
- Rev. Fr. Athanasius Danieletti†, OCD, director (1955–1956), together with Rev. Fr. Cayetano Serafines, the first ordained Carmelite from the Prelature of Infanta, who chose layman's life after retirement from religious life and who served as his assistant
- Rev. Fr. Herman J. Esselman†, OCD (from Athens, Wisconsin, US), director, 1958–1961
- Rev. Fr. Andrew Lefebvre†, OCD (from Saginaw, Michigan, USA), director (1961–1964), with Rev. Fr. Simon Lindgren, OCD, and Rev. Fr. Nicholas Riddell, OCD, as assistant directors (1962–1963, 1963–1964, respectively)
- Rev. Fr. Dominic Sheerer†, OCD (from Philadelphia, Pennsylvania, USA), director (1964–1967), with Rev. Fr. Marius Martin and Rev. Fr. Benjamin Green as assistant directors
- Rev. Fr. Joseph Mary Flannery†, OCD, director, 1967–1968
- Rev. Fr. Alfred Wood, OCD, director, 1968–1970
- Rev. Fr. Arnold S. Boehme, OCD, director, 1970–1971
- Rev. Fr. Ignatius Read, OCD, director, 1971–1973
- Rev. Fr. Alan Rieger, OCD, director (1973), the first episcopal vicar of education for the whole prelature of Infanta; the first executive vice-president (1980)
- Sister Bernadette Rodriguez, CM, directress, 1974–1976
- Dr. Epitacio S. Palispis, the first layman to become the president of MCC Baler, 1976–1982
- Sister Francine Pacis, SFIC, executive vice-president, 1982–1986
- Sister Mercedes E. Salud, SFIC, executive vice-president, 1986–1994
- Sister Esperanza L. Vistro, SFIC, executive vice-president, 1994–2000
- Sister Tarcela O. Taa, SFIC, executive vice-president, 2000–2003
- Rev. Fr. Edwin C. Agapay, acting executive vice-president, 2003–2004
- Sister Mary Paul A. Plasabas, SFIC, executive vice-president, 2004–2008
- Dr. Nida V. Hugo, officer-in-charge, executive vice-president, 2009
- Rev. Fr. Andres A. Lumasac, executive vice-president, 2009 – September 2020
- Rev. Fr. Mark Jeffrey Starr C. Revillo, FLP, officer in charge, executive vice-president, September 2020 – April 2021
- Rev. Fr. Dave D. Capucao, PhD., SThD., executive vice-president, April 2021–present
- Rev. Fr. John Anthony C. Losbañes, EdD., executive vice-president, late 2025–present

Aspiring to be truly with the Church of the poor, the school consequently aligned its thrust and objectives, such as the promotion of the fullness of life and the nurturance of humanizing relationships, with the 1995 mission statement of the prelature.

The "Panalangin ng Carmelian" (literally, "Prayer of a Carmelian") was formulated in 1995 by the college so as to further strengthen devotion to Mary, mother of Christ, whom the prelature called "ina ng sambayanan ng mga dukha" ("mother of the poor people"). Originally written in Filipino, it has been one of the most recited prayers in school programs and activities since then.

An agreement with SJCQC for the conduct of graduate school extension classes was renewed in 1995 and lapsed in 1998.

The school served as an evacuation center for the people of Baler who were affected by flash floods on December 24, 1995.

To keep pace with the technological progress, the school offered new programs, such as the Bachelor of Science in Accountancy (BSA), the Computer Secretarial, and the Computer Science, in the academic year 1995–1996. The Bachelor of Secondary Education (BSEd), major in religious education, was offered in the school year 1997–1998 to grant the request for teachers of Christian formation subjects.

The school celebrated its golden jubilee on February 18, 1998, the same day when one of its buildings, the Aurora Building, was dedicated in loving memory of Doña Aurora.

The Bishop Julio Xavier Labayen scholarship fund for the financially poor but academically capable students of the prelature was launched on July 23, 1999, the same day when a two-storey retreat house was dedicated to the bishop.

=== 2000–present ===
The Bachelor of Science in Criminology (BSCrim) program was offered in 2003.

The basic education and the higher education departments of the school were restructured in 2004.

The mission statement of the school was revised in 2007 with the inclusion of the Carmelian spirit of prayer, compassion, and prophetic action. The vision and mission of the school were reformulated as follows: “We, the Catholic schools in the Prelature of Infanta, inspired by the Blessed Trinity, strive towards the holistic formation of the person and society in communion with the Church, the community, and the family under the maternal care of Our Lady of Mount Carmel. We commit ourselves to follow Jesus Christ and the Gospel values, with openness to formation, imbued with the Carmelian spirit of prayer, compassion, and prophetic action, as we continually strive for quality education in the service of the Church and society."

The school celebrated its diamond jubilee on February 18, 2008.

For the second time, the school hosted the CASPI assembly from July 16 to 19, 2013.

The groundbreaking ceremony for the college extension campus in Barangay Pingit, Baler was held on December 28, 2013. It was attended by the school administrator, faculty, staff, studentry, and alumni.

In 2016, the vision and mission of the school were revised as follows: “The Mount Carmel College of Baler as a member of the Catholic Association of Schools in the Prelature of Infanta and mission partner in building the Church of the poor, inspired by the Blessed Trinity, envisions to be a center of holistic formation of the person in communion with the family, the Church, and the community under the maternal care of Our Lady of Mount Carmel. We follow Jesus Christ, the center and life, by living the Carmelian spirit of prayer, compassion, and prophetic action, as we continually strive for quality education in the service of the Church of the poor.”

In June 2016, MCC Baler, in partnership with the College of the Immaculate Conception (CIC) (Cabanatuan), opened graduate programs such as Master of Arts in Education (MAEd), with majors in educational management, early childhood education (ECE), guidance and counseling, English, Filipino, mathematics, sociology, and physical education (PE).

The MCCB main campus in Poblacion and extension campus in Brgy. Pingit were opened as evacuation centers for townspeople during the onslaught of Super Typhoon Pepito on November 16, 2024.

Interestingly, both the MCCB main campus and extension campus were also used on March 18, 2026, as official venues for radio broadcasting during Central Luzon’s Regional Schools Press Conference (RSPC), held in Aurora province from March 18 to 20, 2026.

Mount Carmel Hymn

Hail Mount Carmel! Hail to thee!
We, thy children, sing today.
Loud we praise in song of glee.
One and all, we'll faithful be.
Honor, worship let us pay
Name of glory, victory.

Dearest school, we're proud of thee;
Suffer not our steps astray.
Nothing can thy pow'r withstand;
None can pluck us from thy hand.
We will stand and fight for thee,
Might in hand and heart for thee.

Dear Mount Carmel,
Loved Mount Carmel,
Hail, hail to thee!

What the college seal means
- The Latin statement Zelo zelatus sum pro Domino Deo exercituum (With zeal have I been zealous for the Lord God of hosts) on the sash encircling the shield is the motto of MCC Baler. It is the utterance of the prophet Elijah, expressing his passion to serve Yahweh more than anyone or anything else, which can be found in the First Book of Kings, Chapter 19, Verse 14 in the Holy Bible.
- The mountain silhouette on which a cross stands represents Mount Carmel, a coastal mountain range in northern Israel, where the first hermits settled in the late 12th century and became the mendicant Carmelites in Europe.
- The cross on the mountain silhouette stands for Jesus Christ, the center of the Carmelian life, whose Gospel message of salvation was proclaimed by the Carmelites (who founded the school in 1948 and administered it for 34 years) and is still being proclaimed by the Franciscans (to whom the school administration has been entrusted since 1982).
- The golden yellow star at the center of the mountain silhouette represents Mary, mother of Jesus Christ, the Blessed Virgin, otherwise known as Our Lady of Mount Carmel. The two golden yellow stars near the cross represent Elijah, the greatest prophet of the Old Testament, and his successor Elisha, both of whom are significant figures in the religious Carmelite Order.
- The carmel brown color stands for humility and the yellow color for joy or optimism in the service of the marginalized sectors of the society.
- As a whole, the school insignia represents the Marian and the Elijahn traditions of MCC Baler as a Catholic mission school of higher learning.

Panalangin ng Carmelian
(Original Filipino text)

Maria, aming ina, igawa mo ako ng pusong mapagpakumbaba at payak na patuloy na naghahanap sa Panginoon. Igawa mo ako ng pusong matatag at marangal na hindi pinanghihinaan ng loob sa mga pagkatalo at pagkabigo, isang pusong hindi nagtatanim ng galit at marunong magpatawad na kung hindi nauunawaan ay mananatili pa ring tapat. Igawa mo ako ng isang pusong marunong dumamay sa paghihirap ng iba…pusong marunong magpahalaga sa mumunting biyaya ng pag-ibig…pusong patuloy na nagbibigay kahit pasakitan at talikdan ng iba…pusong buong-layang naglilingkod para sa bansa at sa sambayanan ng Diyos…pusong kailanman ay hindi nawawalan ng pag-asa sa mga nagbabantang pagsubok. O Maria, ina ng Diyos at aking ina, ihubog mo ako ng pusong katulad ng kay Kristo, puno ng pag-ibig ng Ama at para sa lahat, isang pusong pinaghaharian ng Espiritu ng pag-ibig.

Prayer of a Carmelian
(English translation)

Mary, our mother, make me a humble and simple heart that continues to seek the Lord. Make me a steadfast and noble heart that does not grow weary amidst defeats and frustrations, a heart that does not nurse hatred and can forgive, one that remains faithful, even if it is not understood. Make me a heart that can sympathize with the sufferings of others…a heart that can appreciate small blessings of love…a heart that continues to give, even though others make it suffer and leave it behind…a heart that freely serves the country and the people of God…a heart that never loses hope despite the impending trials. O Mary, mother of God and my mother, mold me a heart like Christ's, filled with the love of the Father and love for all, a heart being ruled by the Spirit of love.

== Notable faculty ==
- Dr. José M. Manalo, Filipino author of English language books, lecturer, and university and college professor who became the first college dean when MCHS Baler became MCC Baler on July 11, 1961, with commercial science and liberal arts programs as main offerings

== Notable alumni ==
- John Arcilla, high school class of 1983, multi-awarded Filipino movie actor and environmentalist
- Rommel N. Angara, high school class of 1997, college class of 2013, Tagalog poet and essayist.

== Degree, non-degree, and graduate programs ==
Currently, the higher education department of MCC Baler offers seven Commission on Higher Education (CHED) programs and three Technical Education and Skills Development Authority (TESDA) programs. Its CHED programs are the Bachelor of Arts (AB), major in history, philosophy, and sociology; the Bachelor of Secondary Education (BSEd), major in biological science, mathematics, English, Filipino, social studies, and values education; the Bachelor of Elementary Education (BEEd) with specializations in general content area and in preschool education; the Bachelor of Science in Office Administration (BSOA); the Bachelor of Science in Business Administration (BSBA), major in financial management, human resource development and management, and marketing management; the Bachelor of Science in Criminology (BSCrim); and the Teacher Certificate Program (TCP). Its TESDA programs are the Caregiver Training Program, the Personal Computer (PC) Operation, and the Computer Hardware Servicing NC II.

In June 2016, MCC Baler, in partnership with the College of the Immaculate Conception (CIC) (Cabanatuan), opened graduate programs such as Master of Arts in Education (MAEd), with majors in educational management, early childhood education (ECE), guidance and counseling, English, Filipino, mathematics, sociology, and physical education (PE).

== Professional examinations ==
MCC Baler produced college graduates of education and criminology who traditionally performed well in licensure examinations. Its BEEd and BSEd graduates of 2013 obtained 100% passing rates in the September 29, 2013, Licensure Examination for Teachers (LET). A year earlier, its BEEd and BSEd graduates of 2012 obtained passing rates of 100% and 66.67%, respectively, for first timers in the September 30, 2012, LET. Its BSCrim graduates of 2011 obtained a passing rate of 59.26% for first timers in the October 2011 Criminologist Licensure Examination (CLE).

== Controversies ==
Philippine Senator Edgardo J. Angara called MCC Baler a "bulok na paaralan," that is, literally, a "rotten school," in his speech delivered on August 19, 2011, at the municipal plaza of Baler across the San Luis Obispo de Tolosa Parish on the occasion of the 402nd founding anniversary of this town attended by local government officials and employees, teachers and students, and other townspeople. He unleashed a broadside against the Prelature of Infanta, accusing it of "claiming possession of the municipal plaza and the lot where the college stands." He waved to the crowd photocopies of documents allegedly showing that the plaza has been owned by the parish and the college grounds by the municipal government since 1929. He said that the prelature was able to transfer in its name possession of the plaza and the college site in 1980. He suggested that the college now being run by the parish "be vacated and transferred to another site to pave the way for the restoration of the Baler church." He noted that the college building is an eyesore as it was built "higher than the church, obstructing the religious structure from public view." In a more conciliatory tone, he said that he offered Php30,000,000 as assistance to the local parish to transfer to a better location where it could put up a brand-new campus complete with playground and academic facilities. He mentioned that in 2007 he already made the offer, but it was refused. He clarified that the national government, through his representation, has been providing assistance for MCC Baler students, contrary to the prelature's claim that it was the one helping them. He further said that for the last five years these students received a total of Php26,000,000 in subsidy from the national government through the Government Assistance to Private Education (GASTPE) program which he authored in the Senate. A few weeks later, the prelature issued an official written statement posted on the college bulletin, vehemently denying all of the senator's accusations, calling them as pure fabrications, particularly the alleged 30-million offer for the parish to transfer to another site where it could build a new school.

== Sister schools ==
In the province of Aurora, other Carmel schools in partnership with MCC Baler are Mount Carmel College of Casiguran (MCC Casiguran) (founded in 1968), Mount Carmel School of Dinalungan (MCS Dinalungan), Saint Patrick's Academy (founded in 1968) in Dingalan, Father John Karash Memorial High School (founded in 1966) in Dipaculao, Mount Carmel School of Maria Aurora (MCS Maria Aurora) (founded in 1952), Mount Carmel School of San Luis (MCS San Luis) (founded in 1962), and Our Lady of Consolacion Learning Center (OLaConLeC) in San Luis.

In the province of Quezon, other Carmel schools in touch with MCC Baler are Mount Carmel High School of Burdeos (MCHS Burdeos) (founded in 1949), Mount Carmel High School of General Nakar (MCHS General Nakar) (founded in 1990), Mount Carmel School of Infanta (MCS Infanta) (founded in 1962), SIDS in Patnanungan, and Mount Carmel School of Polillo (MCS Polillo) (founded in 1962).
