= Museo de Baler =

Museum in Aurora, Philippines

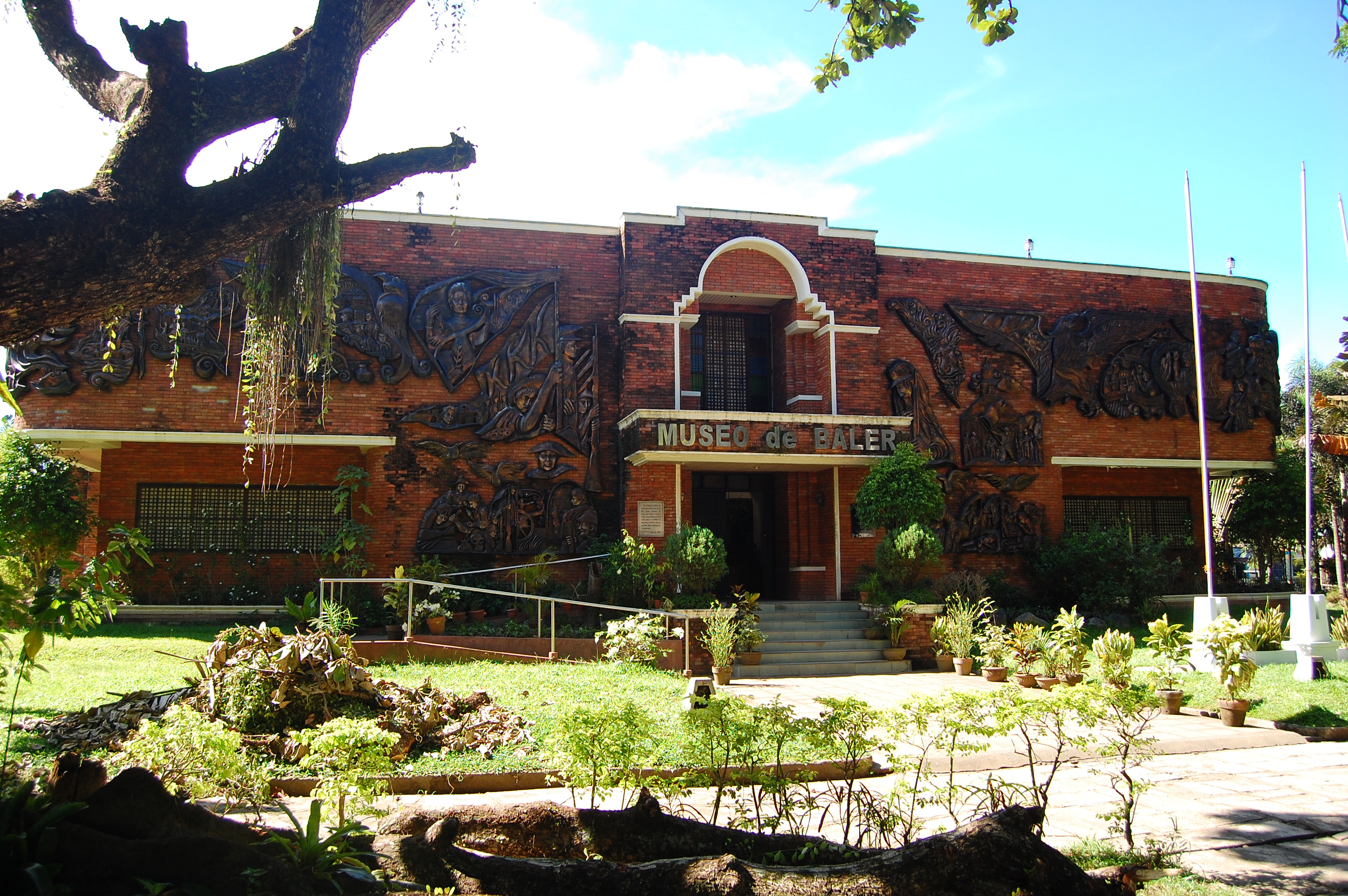
- Established: 2002
- Location: Baler, Aurora
- Coordinates: 15°45′36″N 121°33′42″E
- Type: Museum

The Museo de Baler is a museum located in Baler, Aurora, Philippines. The museum provides an account of Baler's history, as well as local artifacts and exhibits.

== History ==
The museum was inaugurated in 2002. It was established to commemorate the Philippine-Spanish Friendship Day and the Siege of Baler, a battle during the Philippine Revolution in 1898. The cold cast, which covers the museum's façade, was created by Filipino sculptor Toym Imao.

The museum's compound also hosts a historical marker that the Philippines Historical Committee, now the National Historical Commission of the Philippines, installed on the site in 1948 to denote the birthplace of Manuel Quezon, the country's second president.

== Collection and exhibits ==
- Artifacts from pre-colonial and Spanish era in the Philippines
- Exhibit on the Siege of Baler
- Chinese porcelain items from shipwrecks
- Manuel Quezon statue and presidential car
- Exhibit about Aurora, the wife of Manuel Quezon

== Gallery ==
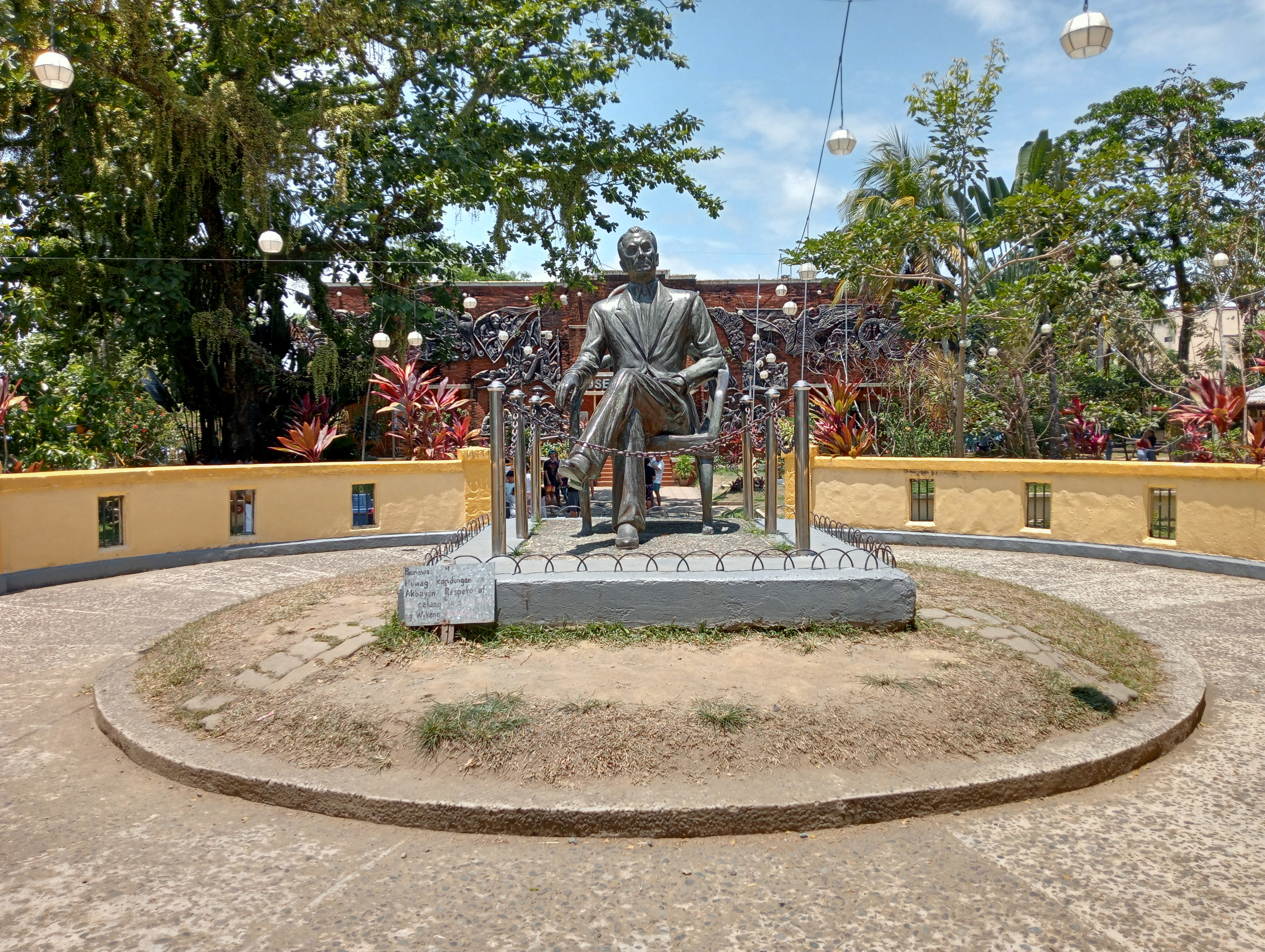
Manuel Quezon statue

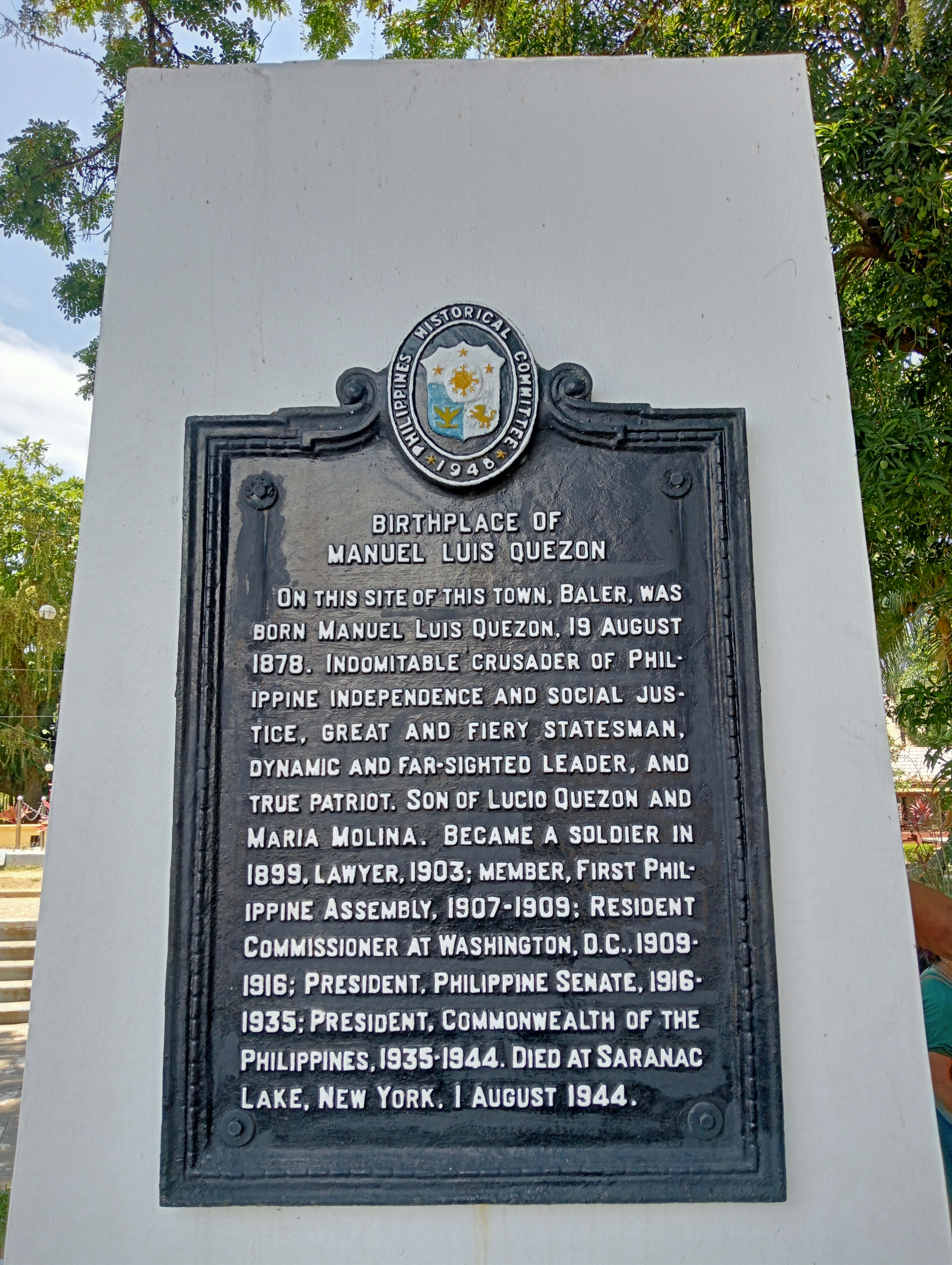
PHC historical marker

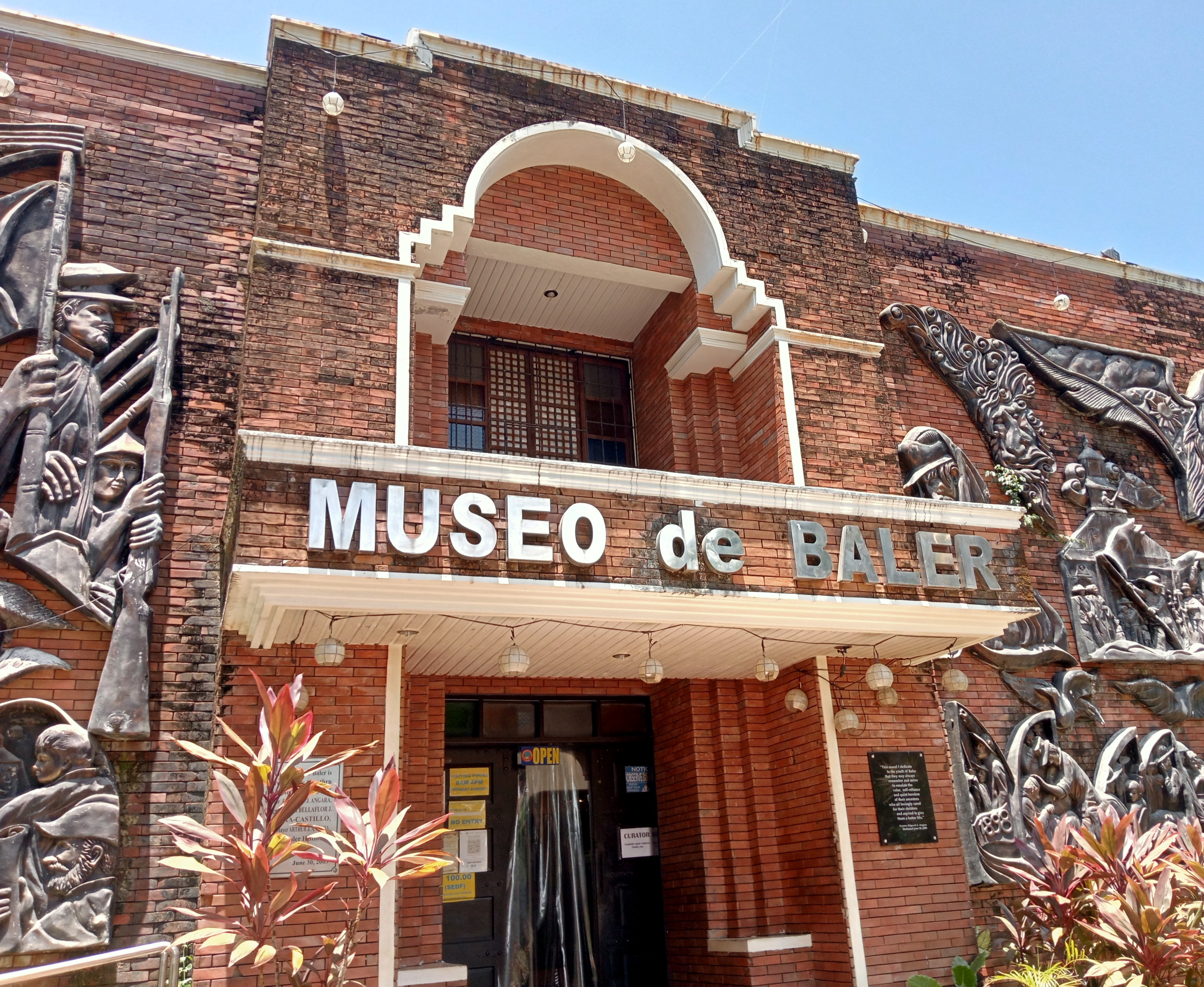
Facade

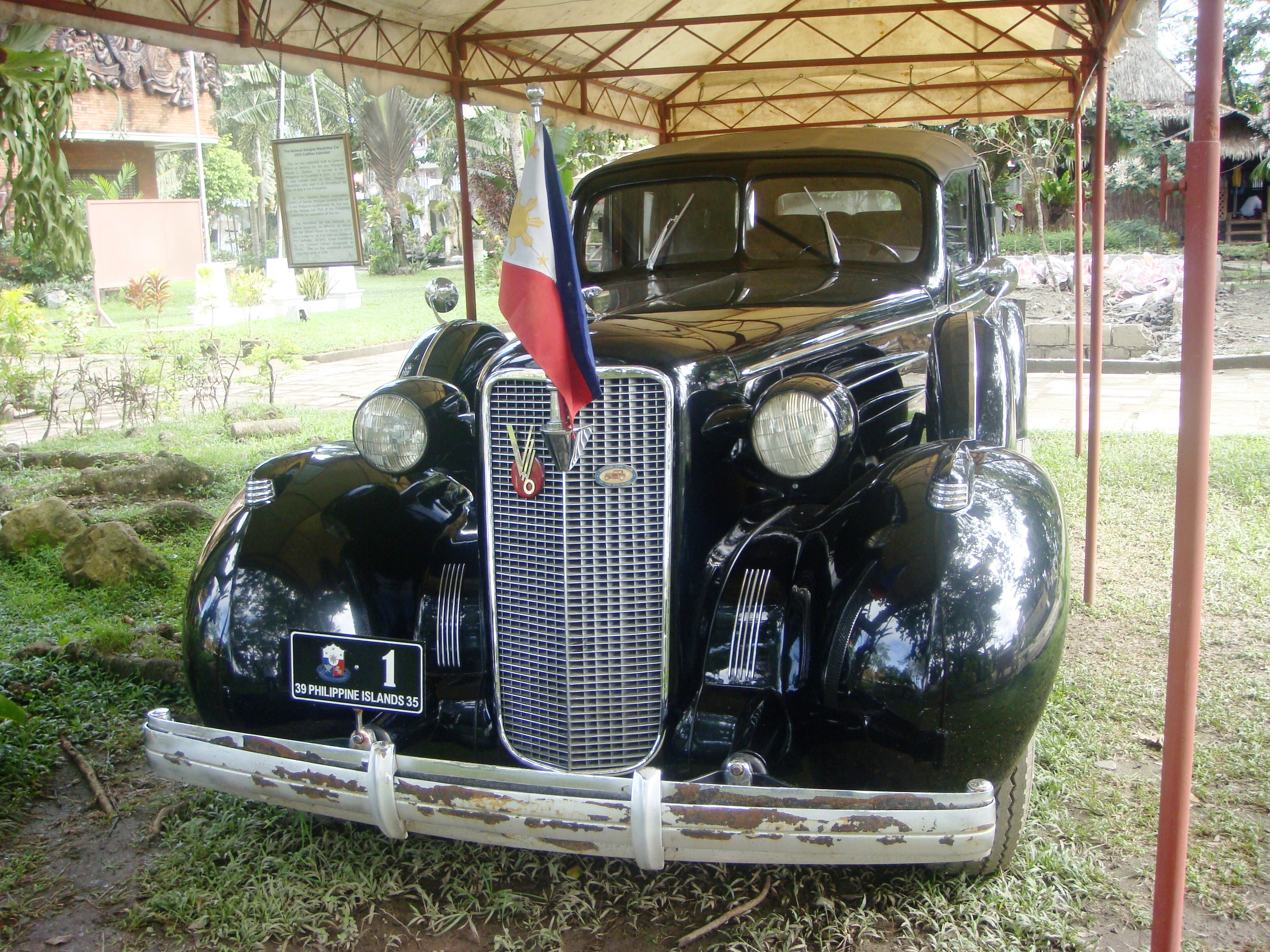
Exhibited Cadillac car
