= Rommel Angara =

Rommel Angara may refer to:

- Rommel T. Angara (born 1978), Filipino politician
- Rommel N. Angara (born 1980), Filipino poet and essayist
