= Baler National High School =

Public high school in Aurora, Philippines

Location
- Baler, Aurora, Philippines
- Coordinates: 15°44′45″N 121°33′32″E

Information
- Type: Secondary Public Regular/S.T.E.M Grade/High School

Baler National High School was built in February 1993 on agricultural land in Barangay Pingit. It started with 110 students and 3 teachers. To date, it is the biggest public secondary school in Aurora, with close to 1,300 students. It now follows the K-12 program for the Filipinos in order to excel both the Philippines and the world.

Its facilities include a covered court, internet and computer laboratory, science laboratory, canteen, music room, clinic, guidance office and 25 classrooms. The government of Australia and the Philippines built a new building compromising of 6 classrooms by the schoolyear 2014–2015. The weather condition in Baler is unpredictable. Furthermore, since it is situated near a river, when it rains, it floods easily.

== Sections ==
It is divided into a Regular Section and a S.T.E.M Section.

- Regular Section – This section mostly consists of 6 bi-sections, depending on the number of enrollees. Identifying themselves as bi-section A-F, G, H or so on.
- S.T.E.M. (Science, Technology, Engineering and Mathematics) Section – This section only consists of one bi-section per grade. It offers the highest education for public schools in the whole province.
- S.P.A.(Special Program in the Arts) section – The SPA section has four sections which is Dance, Vocal, Instruments, and Visual Arts.

Furthermore, Baler NHS offers Mandarin Chinese in a Special Program in Foreign Language.
