= José M. Manalo =

Filipino writer

Dr. José M. Manalo was a Filipino author of English language books.

== Education ==
He earned his Bachelor of Arts (AB) degree in 1950 and his Master of Arts (MA) degree in 1961 from the Ateneo de Manila University.

== Career ==
He served as president of the Rotary Club of the Philippines and communications consultant to a number of business firms, set up the first speech laboratory of Philippine Airlines (PAL), and gave the first formal speech training of its flight stewards and stewardesses in the 1950s.

As an educator, he acted as dean of the Institute of Arts and Sciences at the Philippine College of Commerce [now Polytechnic University of the Philippines (PUP)]; dean of the college of liberal arts at Mount Carmel College of Baler (MCC Baler); head of the English and speech departments of the University of Manila (UM); speech and drama director of Saint Paul's College of Quezon City (SPCQC) (now Saint Paul University of Quezon City), Saint Joseph's College of Quezon City (SJCQC), and the UM; speech consultant and speech instructor of PAL, Philippine Air Force (PAF), and San Miguel Corporation (SMC); and professor of English grammar, composition, literature, speech, dramatics, radio-television broadcasting, and the humanities at the University of the East (UE), UM, Far Eastern University (FEU), Centro Escolar University (CEU), National Teachers College (NTC), La Concordia College, Stella Maris College of Quezon City, SJCQC, SPCQC, MCC Baler, Immaculate Heart of Mary College in Quezon City, and Ateneo de Manila University.
