= Aurora National Science High School =

Public high school in Aurora, Philippines

- Mataas na Paaralang Nasyonal na Pang-agham ng Aurora

Location
- Baler, Aurora, Philippines
- Coordinates: 15°45′36″N 121°33′03″E

Information
- Type: Secondary Public Science High School
- Grades: 7 to 12

The Aurora National Science High School (Mataas na Paaralang Nasyonal na Pang-agham ng Aurora in Filipino) is a secondary public science High School located in Baler, Aurora, Philippines. It is a DepEd-recognized science high school. ANSHS or ANSci is one of the most respected schools in Aurora.

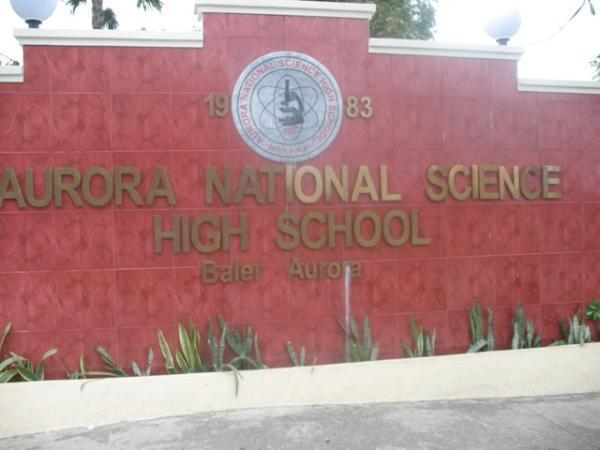
ANSHS main gate
