= Philippine–Spanish Friendship Day =

Friendship Celebration Between Spain and the Philippines

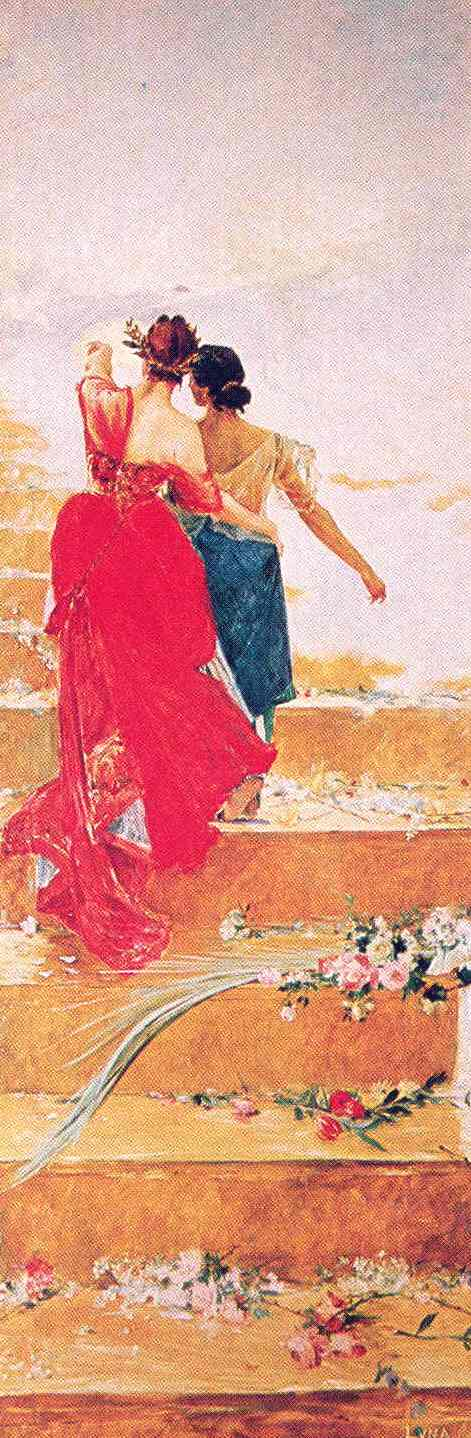
right España y Filipinas, 1886 oil on canvas painting by Juan Luna

Philippine–Spanish Friendship Day (Spanish: Día de la Amistad Hispano-Filipina, Filipino: Araw ng Pagkakaibigang Pilipino-Espanyol or Araw ng Pagkakaibigan ng mga Pilipino at Espanyol) celebrates the strong links between the Republic of the Philippines and the Kingdom of Spain every June 30. It commemorates the day when General Emilio Aguinaldo, president of the First Philippine Republic, issued a decree requiring the last Spanish soldiers who had been besieged for almost a year inside Baler's church be treated not as enemies and prisoners of war, but as friends. It also ordered that they receive the necessary permission for their return to Spain.

Senator Edgardo Angara, the Friendship Day's main sponsor, described this occasion as, "a glorious day for both countries because the Siege of Baler brought heroes and victory for both parties." Today, it symbolizes the great friendship between both countries.

== Background ==
The Philippine–Spanish Friendship Day Bill was passed on July 22, 2002, and Republic Act No. 9187 was approved on February 5, 2003—both as means to strengthen the relationship between two nations that share history, values and traditions.

Republic Act No. 9187 states:

June 30 is a day when President Emilio Aguinaldo commended the besieged Spanish soldiers in the Church of Baler for their loyalty and gallantry. To mark this momentous occasion, there is a need to declare said day a national holiday to remember the act of benevolence which has paved the way in bridging better relations between Philippines and Spain.

The 30th of June of each year is hereby declared as Philippine-Spanish Friendship Day to commemorate the cultural and historical ties, friendship and cooperation between the Philippines and Spain. It is hereby declared as a national special working holiday and a special non-working holiday in Aurora Province.

== Siege of Baler ==
Philippine–Spanish Friendship Day relates to Siege of Baler. A group of Spanish soldiers garrisoned inside the town church in Baler, Aurora and defended the Spanish flag from July 1, 1898, to June 2, 1899—without knowing that Spain had already given its principal colony in Asia independence on December 10, 1898, by signing the Treaty of Paris.

Heroism and stubbornness led the 33 soldiers, commanded by Captain Enrique de las Morenas y Fossí and Lieutenant Saturnino Martín y Cerezo, not only to survive, but to earn the respect of the revolutionary army of the Malolos Republic, whose safe return to Spain was ordered by General Emilio Aguinaldo. This group of soldiers came to be known as Los últimos de Filipinas (The last ones of the Philippines).

The Siege of Baler was led by Revolutionary Colonel Simon Ocampo Tecson of San Miguel, Bulacan, the field commanding officer - List of Filipino Generals in the Philippine Revolution of 1896 and the Filipino-American War of 1899.

== Celebration in the Philippines ==
Bilateral relations between the Kingdom of Spain and the Republic of the Philippines had been steadily improving since the formal establishment of Sovereign Tagalog Nation in 1896, Republic of Biak-na-Bato in 1897, Cantonal Republic of Negros in 1898 and Malolos Republic and Republic of Zamboanga in 1899. The Republic of the Philippines and the Kingdom of Spain have renewed their 1947 Treaty of Friendship, expanding it to a Treaty of Friendship and Cooperation in the year 2000. On June 30, 2003, the first celebration of Philippine–Spanish Friendship Day took place in the Philippine town of Baler, Aurora Province, with Senator Edgardo Angara as host. Guests for this first event were, among others, President Gloria Macapagal Arroyo (one of the directors of Philippine Academy of the Spanish Language) and the head of Agencia Española de Cooperación Internacional (Spanish International Cooperation Agency), Dr. Rafael Rodríguez-Ponga Salamanca, the special representative for this occasion, who read an official message from H.M. the King of Spain. It is also celebrated yearly in the town of San Miguel, Bulacan in the house of Simon Tecson - Tecson House. It is the same house where the first Philippine Constitution was ratified with Emilio Aguinaldo.

Since 2003, this celebration has acquired more and more relevance and has kept growing in terms of the amount of activities and projects, which have been organised in different locations:

YEAR	CELEBRATION	HOST	OTHER VENUES	THEME
2003	1st	Region III – Baler	Region III – Malolos	Amistad Duradera (Enduring Friendship)
2004	2nd	Region III – Malolos		Amistad Duradera
2005	3rd	Region VI – Iloilo City		Amistad Duradera
2006	4th	Region IX – Zamboanga City		Amistad Duradera
2007	5th	Region III – Baler	Region I – Vigan, Region VII – Bohol, Region IX – Zamboanga City, and NCR – Manila	Amistad Duradera: Mga Larangan ng Pagtatagpo
2008	6th	Region III – Baler		Amistad Duradera
2009	7th	Region III – Baler		Amistad Duradera
2010	8th	Region III – Baler		
2011	9th	Region III – Baler		Manila galleon

== Celebration in Spain ==
Since 2006, Philippine–Spanish Friendship Day has been simultaneously celebrated and organised in different locations of Spain such as Madrid, Barcelona, Palencia and Almonte in Huelva. In Madrid, several institutions such as the Philippine Embassy and the Asociación Cultural Galeón de Manila celebrate this Friendship Day since 2009.

Today, many titles of nobility were named after Philippine areas. These were created for Spaniards with the exception of the Mayorazgo de Mariquina which was created for the Tuasons. Among them are:

- The Marquessate of Camarines (Marquesado de Camarines) (1872) was created for Manuel Alvarez de Estrada by Amadeo I.
- The Countship of the Conquest of the Batanes Islands (Condado de la Conquista de las Islas Batanes) (1789) was created by Charles IV for Jose Basco y Vargas, a governor-general of the Philippines.
- The Countship of Manila (Condado de Manila) (1848) was created by Isabella II for Narciso Clavería y Zaldúa, a Spanish army officer who served as the Governor-General of the Philippines in the 19th century.
- The Countship of Albay (Condado de Albay) (1898) was created for Pedro de Govantes y Azcárraga and now held by Pilar Beatriz Arizaga de Govantes, whose husband was the once powerful economic advisor of Spain and Caixabank. The Govantes River that flows by Vigan--- also known as Ciudad Real de la Villa Fernandina--- prior to it reaching the sea, was named after one of his ancestors.
- The Viscountcy of Mindanao (Vizcondado de Mindanao) and the Countship of Jolo (Condado de Jolo) --- both titles held by the Malcampo family and headed by Cristina Osorio Malcampo, the 8th Duchess of San Lorenzo de Valhermoso
- The Mayorazgo (Majorat) of Marikina (Mayorazgo de Mariquina) was held by the Chinese-Filipino Tuason family, now headed by Severo Tuason.

Also, many Filipinos held Spanish titles by marriage such as:

- Victoria Gonzalez y Quirino, granddaughter of former Philippine President Elpidio Quirino was married to Manuel Alvarez de Toledo, 5th Duke of Zaragoza. Her daughters with the Duke, Victoria, Maria and Lucia, also hold titles.
- Isabela Gonzalez y Ferrer viuda de Ynchausti, was Marchioness of Viademonte and matriarch of the once powerful and entrepreneurial Ynchausti clan.
- Isabel Preysler descended from the Marquesses of Altamira and the Marquesses of Las Salinas. She is the mother of Enrique Iglesias and who was once Marchioness of Griñón. Her daughter, Tamara Isabel Falco y Presyler, succeeded her father to inherit the title of Marquess of Griñón.
- Sylvia Landahl y Hagedorn was married to Alvaro Moreno, the 8th Count of Los Andes and 13th Marquess of La Eliseda.
- Margarita Zobel de Ayala was Countess of Peracamps (her husband Antonio Melian descended from General Juan Van Halen of Barcelona and was owner of El Hogar Filipino and its headquarters in Binondo/ Santa Cruz Manila area). Her direct descendant is the current count, now based in Peru, Pedro Melian y Ugarte.

There are Filipinos who are descended or are related to noble families in Spain such as:

- Don Pedro Govantes was a politician just like his uncle, the Prime Minister of Spain Marcelo de Azcárraga y Palmero of Cuba and Escolta, Manila, whose very own mother Maria Versosa Palmero Lizarrabal of Albay was related to the Count of Lizarraga. Calle Azcarraga also known as Paseo de Azcarraga was once the name of Quiapo's major thoroughfare, Claro M. Recto Boulevard. His wife's family, the Fesser-Diago, owned all the sugar rail lines around Havana (El Ferrocaril de la Bahia de la Habana / Las Lineas de La Regla y Matanzas)), and stored more than a third of Cuba's legendary sugar (Almacenes de Azucar de La Habana), plus lots of azucareras and a gigantic bank, Banco y Casa de Seguros de Fesser. Their daughter, Margarita de Trenor, was the first Marqchioness of Turia, a title still held by his direct descendant, Don Tomas Trenor, of Valencia, the present Marquess. A son of Prime Minister Azcarraga, Carlos, was active in Spanish politics. Both the Govantes and Azcarraga families descended from Maria Versosa Palmero Lizarrabal of Albay. Another relative, Felipe Maria de Govantes, was a writer and historian like Don Pedro.
- A Zobel descendant, Jaime Juan Urquijo y Zobel de Ayala, is a grandson of Juan Urquijo Chacon and related to the Marquess of Urquijo. The Urquijo family once owned Banco Urquijo and held high positions in Tabacalera.
- The immensely patriotic, military and entrepreneurial Pardo de Tavera family was perhaps the most powerful Filipino-Spanish family as their ancestor Juan Pardo de Tavera was Inquisitor General of Spain and the right hand of his Majesty King Philip II of Spain himself. They were descended from Guiomar Pardo de Tavera, the Marchioness of Malagón and Countess of El Alcazar de Toledo, titles now held by the Dukes of Medinaceli, because the Loinaz-Pardo de Taveras, while senior in the line of succession, refused to succeed as they did not want to lose their Filipino citizenship being very prominent supporters of the Philippine Revolution almost 150 years ago, before the Philippines and Spain enacted dual citizenship treaties that are enforced today.

The current Queen of Spain Letizia's maternal grandmother Enriqueta Rodriguez Figarredo's father was born in the Philippines, and while being of unmixed Spanish extraction, is also considered a Filipino for having been born in Manila during the time when the term Filipino referred exclusively to Spaniards born in the archipelago; hence, insulares.

YEAR	CELEBRATION	HOST
2006	1st	Castile and León – Palencia

== Celebration in other countries ==
YEAR	CITY AND COUNTRY
2003	Tel Aviv, Israel

== See also ==
- Public holidays in the Philippines
- Foreign relations of the Philippines
- Foreign relations of Spain
- Philippines-Spain relations
- Hispanic influence on Filipino culture
- Spanish language in the Philippines
- Spanish-Philippine Friendship Dinner & Symposium 2010 – Asociación Cultural Galeón de Manila (in Spanish)
- Spanish-Philippine Friendship Round Table 2011 – Asociación Cultural Galeón de Manila (in Spanish)
