= Sipag Pinoy =

- Frequency: Bimonthly
- Publisher: Department of Labor and Employment
- First issue: 1993
- Country: Philippines
- Language: Filipino

The Sipag Pinoy is a publication of the Department of Labor and Employment (DOLE) of the national government of the Philippines. Its office is located in Intramuros, Manila. It contains news and articles on industrial relations, officials and employees, labor laws and legislation, and other issues and trends in the labor sector in the Philippines.
