= Baler, Aurora =

Capital of Aurora, Philippines

Baler
- Municipality
- Municipality of Baler
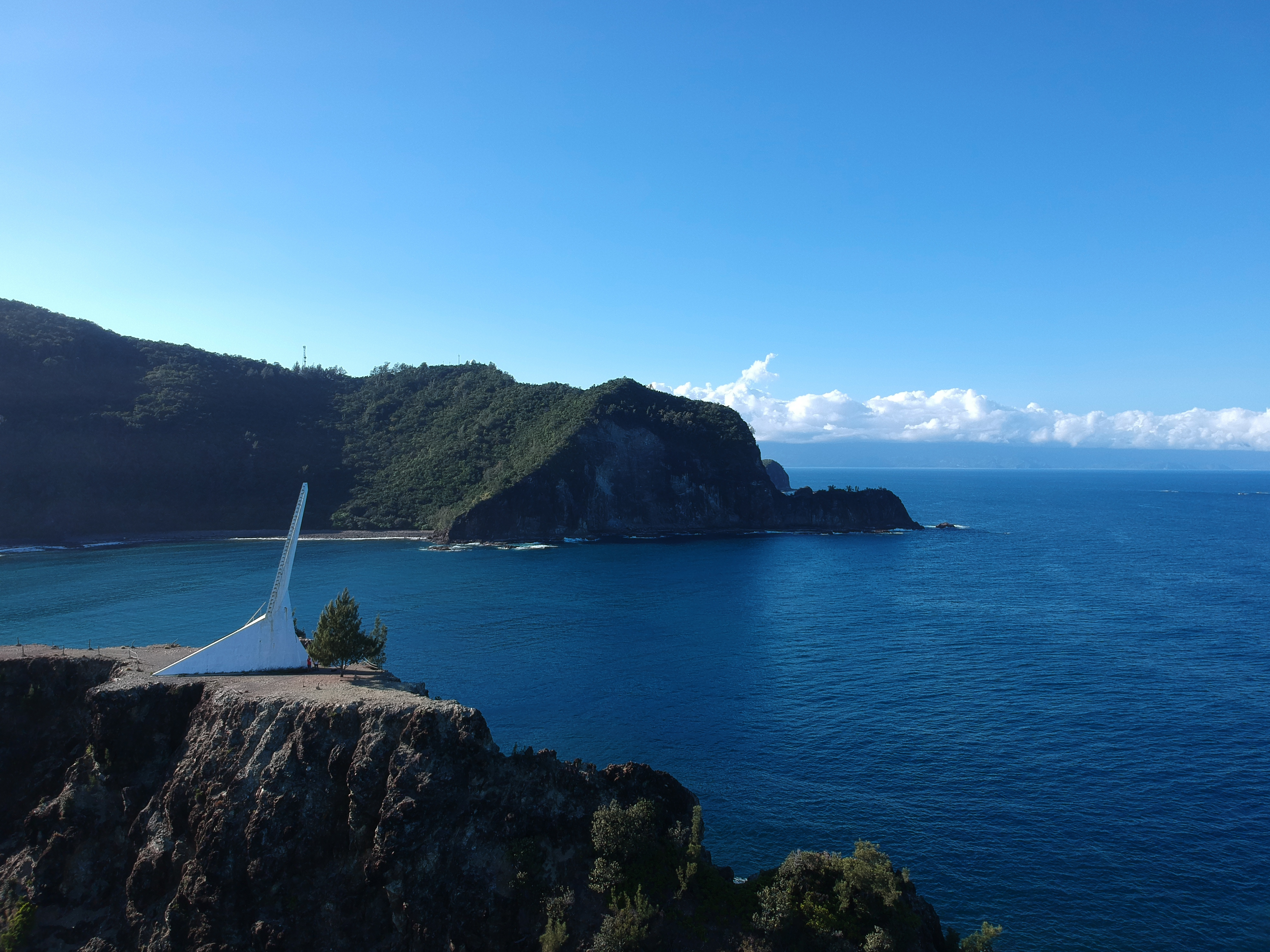
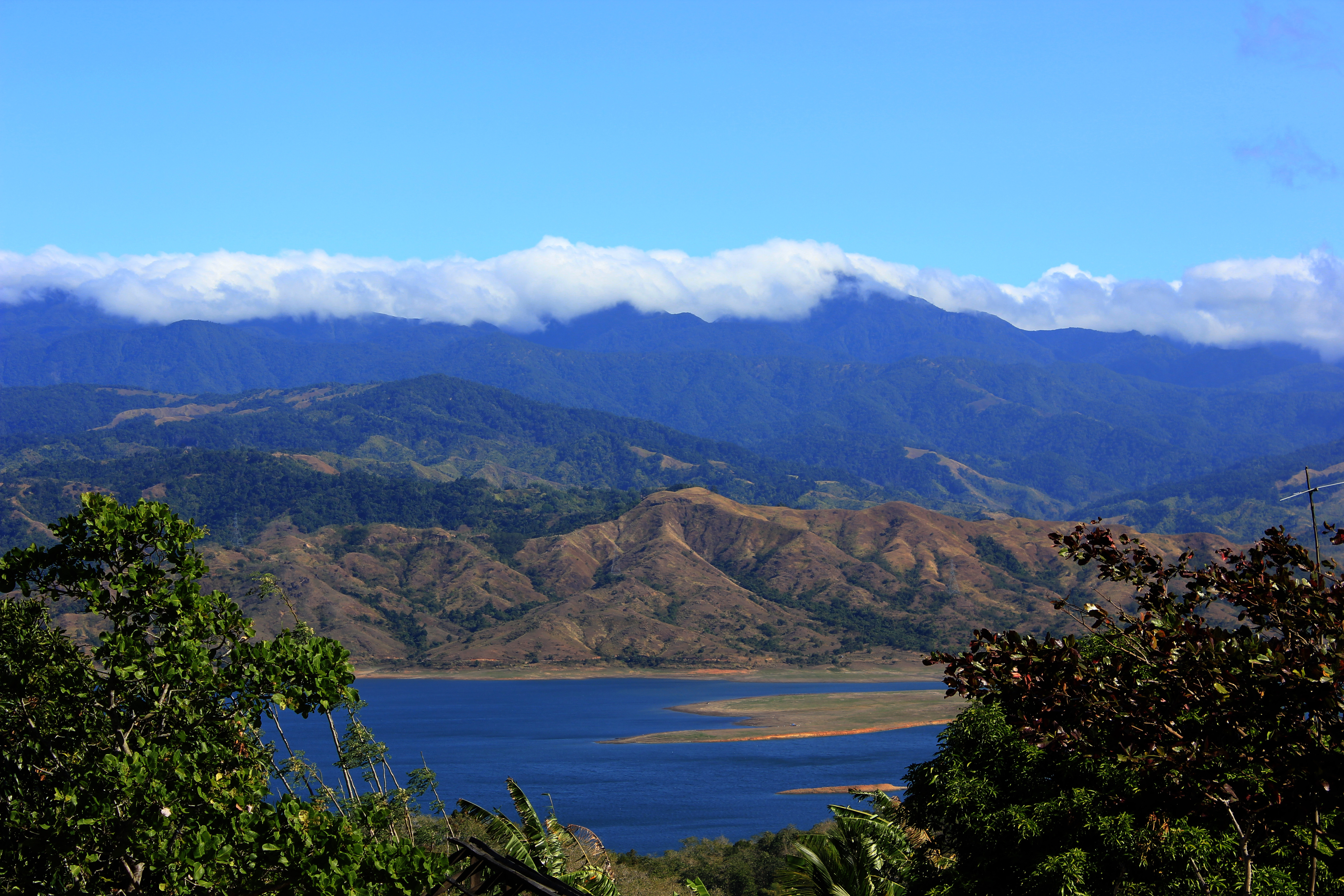
- Dicasalarin Cove Baler Municipal Hall Suclayin

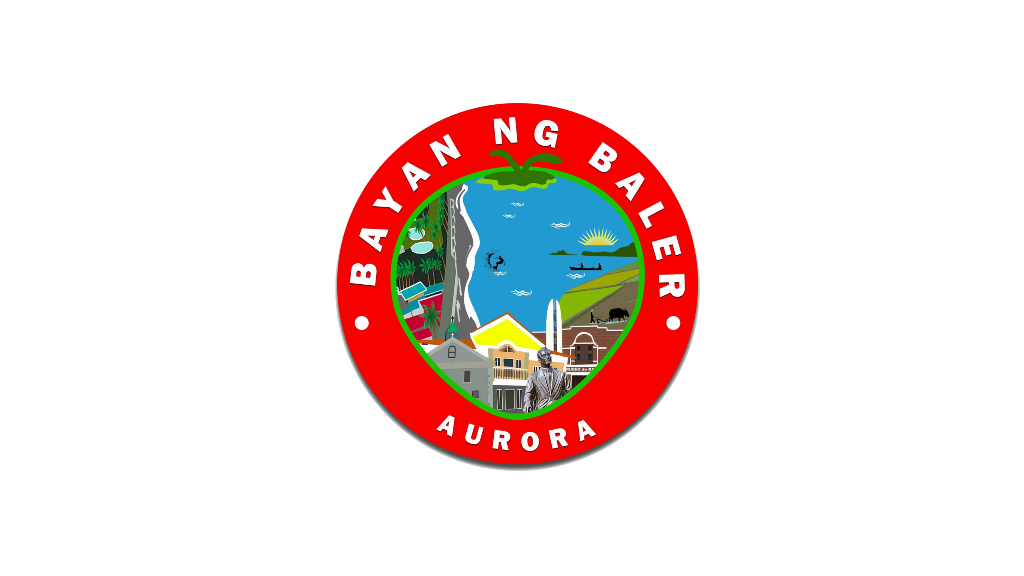
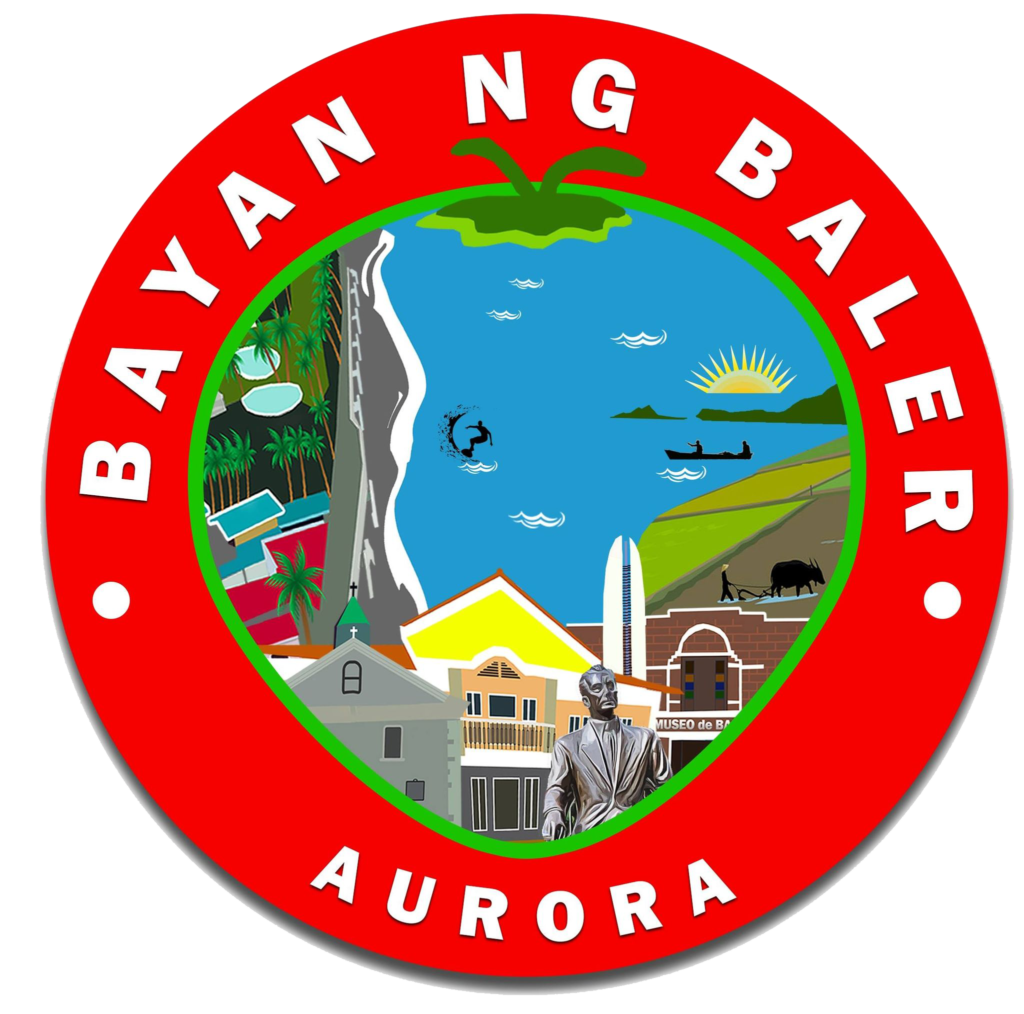
- Flag Seal
- Nickname: Birthplace of Philippine Surfing
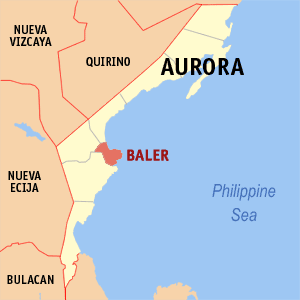
- Map of Aurora with Baler highlighted
- Interactive map of Baler
- Location in the Philippines
- Coordinates: 15°45′30″N 121°33′45″E
- Country: Philippines
- Region: Central Luzon
- Province: Aurora
- District: Lone district
- Founded: August 19, 1609
- Barangays: 13 (see Barangays)

Government
  - Type: Sangguniang Bayan
  - Mayor: Rhett Ronan T. Angara
  - Vice Mayor: Pedro M. Ong Jr.
  - Representative: Rommel Rico T. Angara
  - Municipal Council: Members: Pedro Fernando D. Valenzuela; Emmanuel L. Galban; Danilo M. Ong; Carlito S. Morillo; Ellah Cherryl G. Villacorte; Santino Rosauro C. Guerrero; Francisco B. Zubia III; Lysander R. Querijero
  - Electorate: 28,186 voters (2025)

Area
  - Total: 92.55 km^{2} (35.73 sq mi)
- Elevation: 118 m (387 ft)
- Highest elevation: 1,306 m (4,285 ft)
- Lowest elevation: 0 m (0 ft)

Population (2024 census)
  - Total: 44,684
  - Density: 482.8/km^{2} (1,250/sq mi)
  - Households: 10,197
- Demonym(s): Balereño, Balerino; Baleriano (colloquial)

Economy
  - Income class: 1st municipal income class
  - Poverty incidence: 7.46% (2023)
  - Revenue: ₱ 385.8 million (2024)
  - Assets: ₱ 913.5 million (2024)
  - Expenditure: ₱ 259.5 million (2024)
  - Liabilities: ₱ 138.5 million (2024)

Service provider
  - Electricity: Aurora Electric Cooperative (AURELCO)
- Time zone: UTC+8 (PST)
- ZIP code: 3200
- PSGC: 0307701000
- IDD : area code: +63 (0)42
- Native languages: Northern Alta; Tagalog; Ilocano
- Website: www.baler-aurora.gov.ph, https://baler.gov.ph/socio-economic-profile/

Baler (/bɑːˈlɛr/, /bɒˈlɛr/, /bʌˈlɛər/, bah-LAIR; [bɐˈleɾ]), officially the Municipality of Baler (Tagalog: Bayan ng Baler; Ilocano: Ili ti Baler; Spanish: Municipio de Baler), is a municipality and capital of the province of Aurora, Philippines. According to the 2024 census, it has a population of 44,684 people.

The town is known as the birthplace of Manuel L. Quezon, the 2nd President of the Philippines.

== History ==
=== Spanish colonial period ===
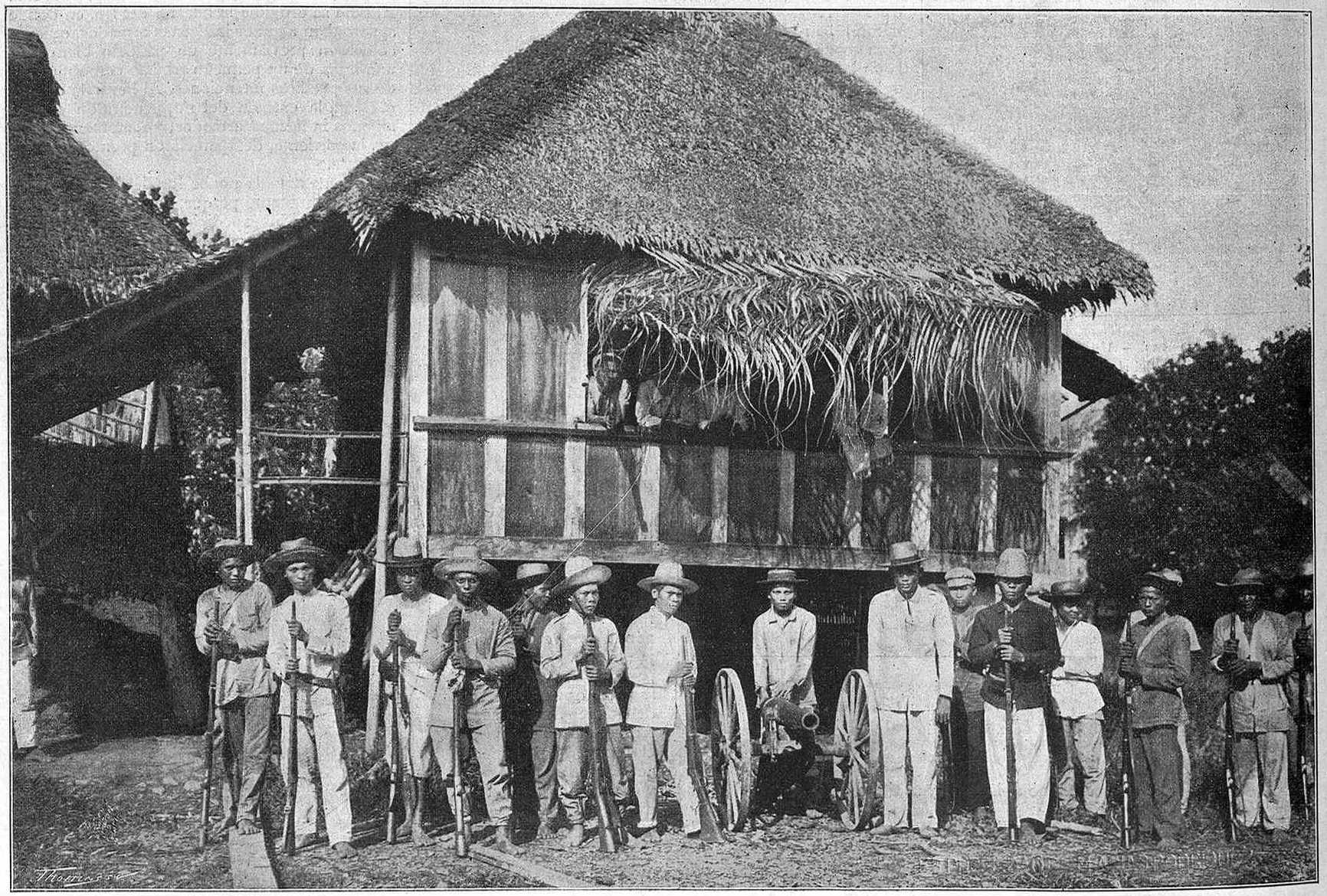
Filipino troops of Colonel Tecson in Baler (May 1899)

In 1609, seven Franciscan missionaries led by Fray Blas Palomino founded the settlement of Baler. It was later converted into a pueblo (town) by the Augustinians and the Recollects in 1658. Due to the scarcity of religious missionaries, the Franciscans again took over the administration of the settlement in 1703.

On December 27, 1735, a great storm struck the town and a huge wave called tromba marina devastated the old town settlement then located in Barrio Sabang. Among the survivors were the Angaras, Bijasas, Bitongs, Lumasacs, Carrascos, and Pobletes who swam towards the nearby Ermita Hill. A new community sprang into what is now the Poblacion of Baler, leaving "Kinagunasan," the place of devastation. A mural depicting this wave can be found in the Museo de Baler in town.

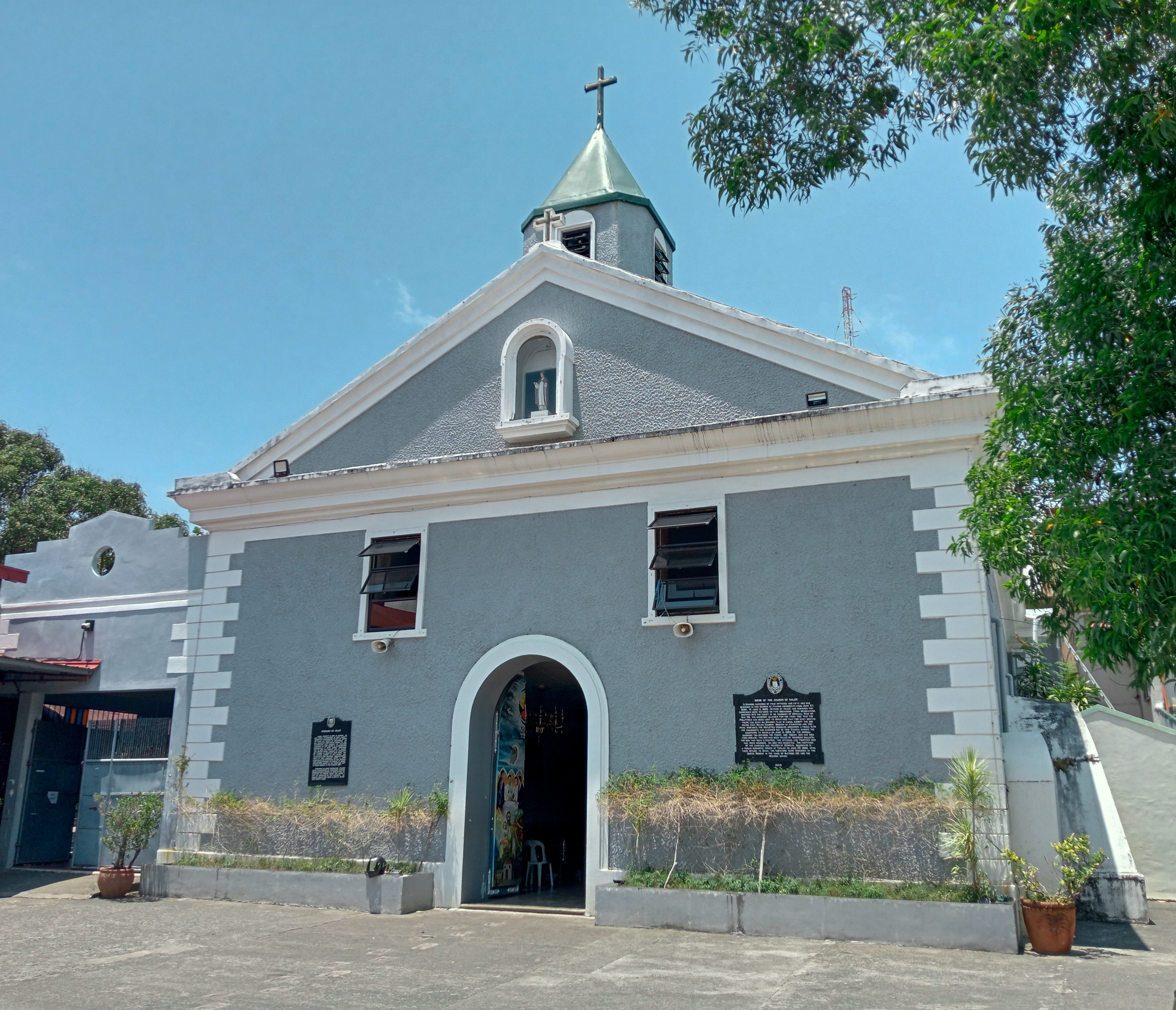
San Luis Obispo de Tolosa Church, location of the Siege of Baler

On June 27, 1898, 15 days after the Philippine Declaration of Independence, 54 Spanish soldiers of the Baler garrison, under the command of Captain Enrique de las Morenas y Fossi, made San Luis Obispo de Tolosa Church, named in Spanish for Louis of Toulouse, their barracks. When de las Morenas died on November 22, 1898, Lieutenant Saturnino Martín Cerezo replaced him. On June 2, 1899, the last Spanish garrison in the Philippines surrendered after the Siege of Baler, effectively ending over 300 years of Spanish rule in the country.

=== American colonial period ===
In 1902, the Americans incorporated the town into the province of Tayabas. Before the Americans came, Baler was under the district of El Príncipe in the Nueva Ecija province.

The Comedia de Baler of Aurora mounted its first production in 1927. It was supported by then President Manuel L. Quezon and enjoyed the collaboration of artists Fortunato Esoreña and Alejandro Ferreras and arnis expert Antonino Ramos. Still active today, it features a group of colorfully attired performers using authentic weapons, like swords and knives, in their plays. Manuel L. Quezon was the governor of Tayabas, which was renamed Quezon in his honor.

=== Japanese occupation ===
In 1942, the Imperial Japanese Army entered Baler, where they made the Baler Elementary School building their garrison under the command of a certain Captain Hattori. The general headquarters and camp base of the Philippine Commonwealth Army from January 3, 1942, to June 30, 1946, and the Philippine Constabulary from October 28, 1944, to June 30, 1946, were stationed in Baler.

In 1945, Filipino and American troops landed in Baler, including Filipino troops of the 3rd Infantry Division, the 5th Infantry Division, the 51st Infantry Division, and the 52nd Infantry Division of the Philippine Commonwealth Army, the 5th Constabulary Regiment of the Philippine Constabulary, the local recognized guerrilla unit, and the American troops of the 6th Infantry Division of the United States Army. The retreating Japanese troops destroyed the San Luis Obispo de Tolosa Church in Baler.

=== Post-war period ===
It became the capital of Aurora on June 14, 1951, under Republic Act No. 648 signed by President Elpidio Quirino. Baler is the birthplace of Manuel Quezon and his cousin and wife Aurora Aragon-Quezon. One obvious reason for locating the sub-provincial capital in Baler was the area's isolation from the rest of Quezon Province: there were no direct links to the rest of the province and much of the terrain was mountainous and heavily forested, which made the area relatively isolated, and its distance from Quezon's capital Lucena.

In 1956, the barrio of Dingalan was converted into a municipal district within Baler and later became a town in its right.

In the 1970s, Baler begun to be recognized as a surfing spot. In 1972, American surfer Steve Scott visited the town. It also served as the filming location for the 1979 film Apocalypse Now which further promoted the discipline.

It remained the seat of government of Aurora on November 21, 1978, under Batas Pambansa Blg. 7 signed by President Ferdinand Marcos.

On August 6, 2023, Republic Act No. 11957 became law recognizing Baler as the Birthplace of Philippine Surfing.

== Geography ==
According to the Philippine Statistics Authority, the municipality has a land area of 92.55 square kilometers (35.73 sq mi) constituting 2.94% of the 3,147.32-square-kilometer (1,215.19 sq mi) total area of Aurora.

Baler is situated 268.04 kilometers (166.55 mi) from the country's capital city of Manila via CLLEX, or 230 kilometers (140 mi) via the Maharlika Highway passing through Bulacan and Nueva Ecija. It is accessible by bus and private vehicles via a mountain pass. It is host to spectacular geographic formations and is situated on a vast plain at the south end of Baler Bay, a contiguous segment of the Philippine Sea.

=== Barangays ===
Baler is politically subdivided into 13 barangays. Each barangay consists of puroks and some have sitios.

PSGC	Barangay	Population			±% p.a.	
		2024		2010		
037701001	Barangay I (Poblacion)	1.3%	587	717	▾	−1.37%
037701002	Barangay II (Poblacion)	0.7%	312	374	▾	−1.24%
037701003	Barangay III (Poblacion)	0.8%	357	434	▾	−1.33%
037701004	Barangay IV (Poblacion)	0.8%	363	389	▾	−0.47%
037701005	Barangay V (Poblacion)	3.8%	1,718	1,662	▴	0.23%
037701006	Buhangin	11.9%	5,310	5,057	▴	0.34%
037701007	Calabuanan	8.7%	3,895	3,221	▴	1.32%
037701008	Obligacion	2.7%	1,215	1,135	▴	0.47%
037701009	Pingit	13.2%	5,913	4,989	▴	1.18%
037701010	Reserva	10.2%	4,580	4,064	▴	0.83%
037701011	Sabang	10.8%	4,833	4,829	▴	0.01%
037701012	Suclayin	14.2%	6,341	5,923	▴	0.47%
037701013	Zabali	9.3%	4,138	3,216	▴	1.75%
	Total		44,684	36,010	▴	1.50%

=== Climate ===
Climate data for Baler, Aurora (1995–2020, extremes 1949–2020)
Month	Jan	Feb	Mar	Apr	May	Jun	Jul	Aug	Sep	Oct	Nov	Dec	Year
Record high °C (°F)	33.3 (91.9)	35.0 (95.0)	35.8 (96.4)	37.5 (99.5)	38.6 (101.5)	38.8 (101.8)	41.2 (106.2)	37.0 (98.6)	37.0 (98.6)	35.5 (95.9)	34.2 (93.6)	33.9 (93.0)	41.2 (106.2)
Mean daily maximum °C (°F)	27.7 (81.9)	28.4 (83.1)	29.6 (85.3)	30.9 (87.6)	31.5 (88.7)	31.8 (89.2)	31.2 (88.2)	31.5 (88.7)	31.4 (88.5)	30.7 (87.3)	29.5 (85.1)	28.0 (82.4)	30.2 (86.4)
Daily mean °C (°F)	24.5 (76.1)	24.9 (76.8)	25.9 (78.6)	27.1 (80.8)	27.8 (82.0)	28.2 (82.8)	27.7 (81.9)	27.9 (82.2)	27.8 (82.0)	27.2 (81.0)	26.2 (79.2)	25.0 (77.0)	26.7 (80.1)
Mean daily minimum °C (°F)	21.3 (70.3)	21.4 (70.5)	22.3 (72.1)	23.4 (74.1)	24.2 (75.6)	24.6 (76.3)	24.2 (75.6)	24.4 (75.9)	24.1 (75.4)	23.7 (74.7)	22.9 (73.2)	22.0 (71.6)	23.2 (73.8)
Record low °C (°F)	14.3 (57.7)	15.3 (59.5)	17.1 (62.8)	17.7 (63.9)	20.0 (68.0)	20.0 (68.0)	20.0 (68.0)	20.0 (68.0)	19.6 (67.3)	18.3 (64.9)	17.1 (62.8)	16.1 (61.0)	14.3 (57.7)
Average rainfall mm (inches)	227.4 (8.95)	182.0 (7.17)	193.7 (7.63)	203.2 (8.00)	296.6 (11.68)	246.7 (9.71)	286.0 (11.26)	169.9 (6.69)	317.1 (12.48)	394.4 (15.53)	385.9 (15.19)	454.1 (17.88)	3,357 (132.17)
Average rainy days (≥ 1.0 mm)	13	11	13	13	14	14	16	13	15	16	14	15	167
Average relative humidity (%)	86	86	86	86	85	84	84	83	84	85	87	87	85
Source: PAGASA

== Demographics ==
Population census of Baler
Year	Pop.	±% p.a.
1903	2,417	—
1918	3,413	+2.33%
1939	11,887	+6.12%
1948	17,182	+4.18%
1960	10,350	−4.14%
1970	14,632	+3.52%
1975	16,046	+1.87%
1980	18,349	+2.72%
1990	24,689	+3.01%
1995	26,919	+1.63%
2000	29,923	+2.29%
2007	34,492	+1.98%
2010	36,010	+1.58%
2015	39,562	+1.81%
2020	43,785	+2.16%
2024	44,684	+0.49%
Source: Philippine Statistics Authority

People with connections to the town are referred to as Balereños. Prior to the arrival of Spanish missionaries in Baler in 1609, settlements by Aeta people and Bugkalot in Baler's coast and mountain areas already exists, along with Kapampangan settlements in coast and plains. Tagalogs, some originating from Palanan and Infanta, Quezon, came in to the area to trade by boat. Some Tagalogs settled in Baler and married with the Aeta and Bugkalots. Kapampangans assimilated to the Tagalog settlers.

The Spanish brought in Filipino acolytes from other areas of Luzon from 1609 to 1899. During this period, Baler can only be accessed by sea though the town saw increase migration from other parts of Luzon such as Laguna, Tayabas, and Bicol from the south.The opening of the Baler-Bongabon Road allowed easier migration of people from Ilocos and Isabela areas from the north; during the Spanish time before the opening of the road, Ilocano and Isabela settlers already moved to Baler. The road also allowed Igorot people and Batangueños to settle in Baler. In 1896, a group of Ilocanos from Aringay, La Union came to settle in San Jose, now called Maria Aurora. In 1906, another group of Ilocanos arrived from La Union and Pangasinan. The guerrilla movement during the Japanese occupation brought Novo Ecijanos (people from Nueva Ecija) to Baler; Novo Ecijanos include Tagalogs, Ilocanos, and Kapampangans, with quite large number of Pangasinenses. The Balereños learned trade from the Batangueños and the Novo Ecijanos; where before they used to share what they have, now they would sell coconut to their neighbors. Other ethnic groups who came and stayed in Baler include Christianized Gaddang and Isinai settlers who settled the surrounding lowlands of Baler Bay.

In the 2024 census, Baler had a population of 44,684 people. The population density was 480 inhabitants per square kilometer (1,200/sq mi).

=== Languages ===
The Tagalog and Ilocano languages are the main languages spoken in Baler. The province of Aurora is claimed to primarily speak a Tagalog dialect that is closely related to the Tayabas Tagalog of Quezon, with some Ilocano influences. In Baler, for example, the variety is called Tagalog-Baler (Balereño). The Tagalog dialect of Balereños is also known for distinctive expressions like akkaw, used to express surprise, wonder, disgust, and objection; it is also akin term expressions spoken in Baler are are(h), used to express a negative feeling of surprise; anin, used to express regret or pity for a situation; and many other words are also spoken similarly to neighboring Quezon, like adyo, meaning to climb, and puropur, which pertain to rain with gusty wind. Manuel L. Quezon, who was from Baler, was called the Father of the National Language for approving the recommendation of the Institute of National Language for Tagalog as the basis of the national language. Other languages spoken in Baler are Kapampangan, Pangasinan, Ga'dang, Isinai in surrounding lowlands of Baler Bay, Bugkalot and Northern Alta or Edimala.

== Economy ==
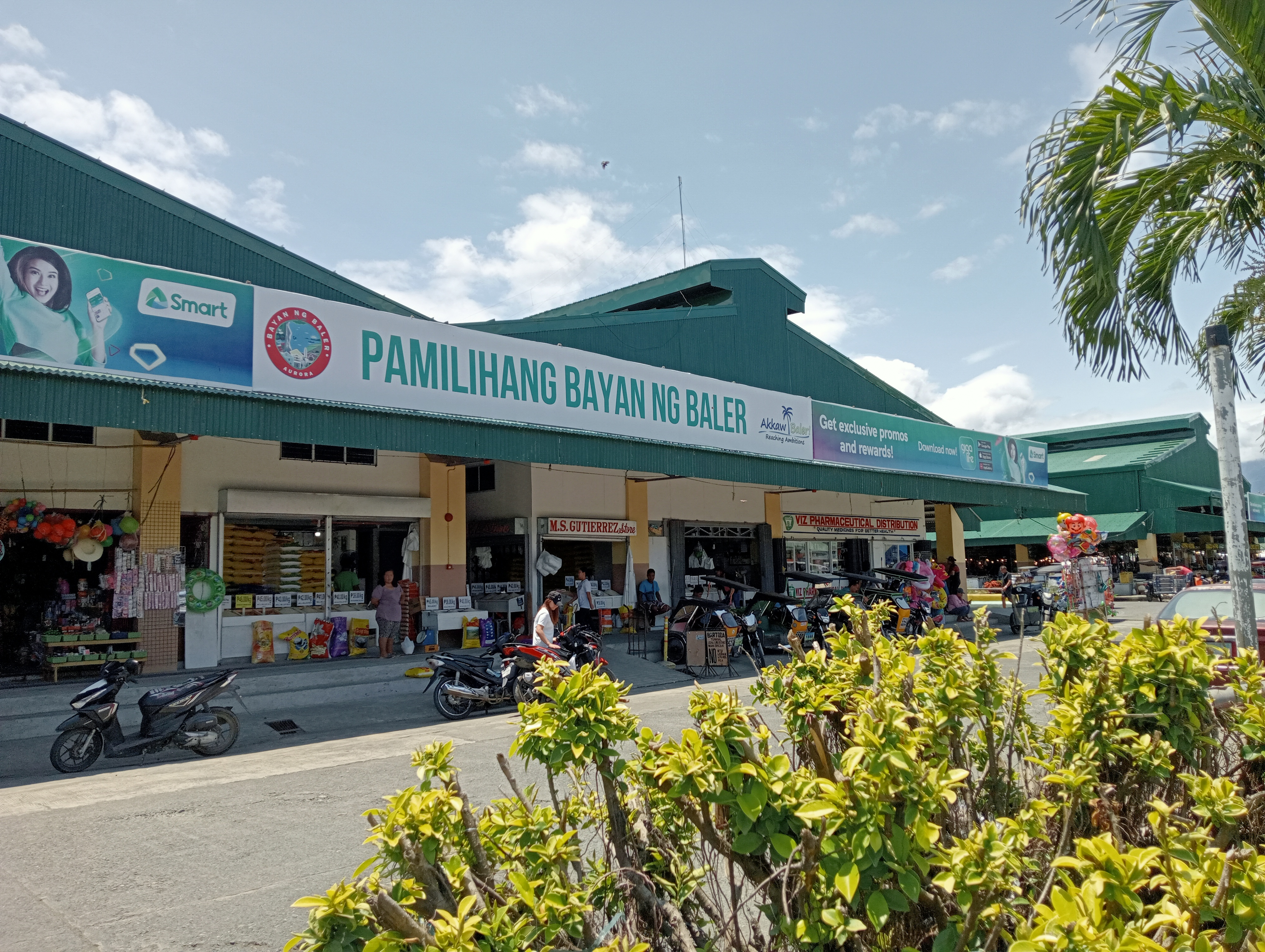
Baler Public Market

Poverty incidence of Baler (%)

Source: Philippine Statistics Authority

== Government ==
=== Local government ===
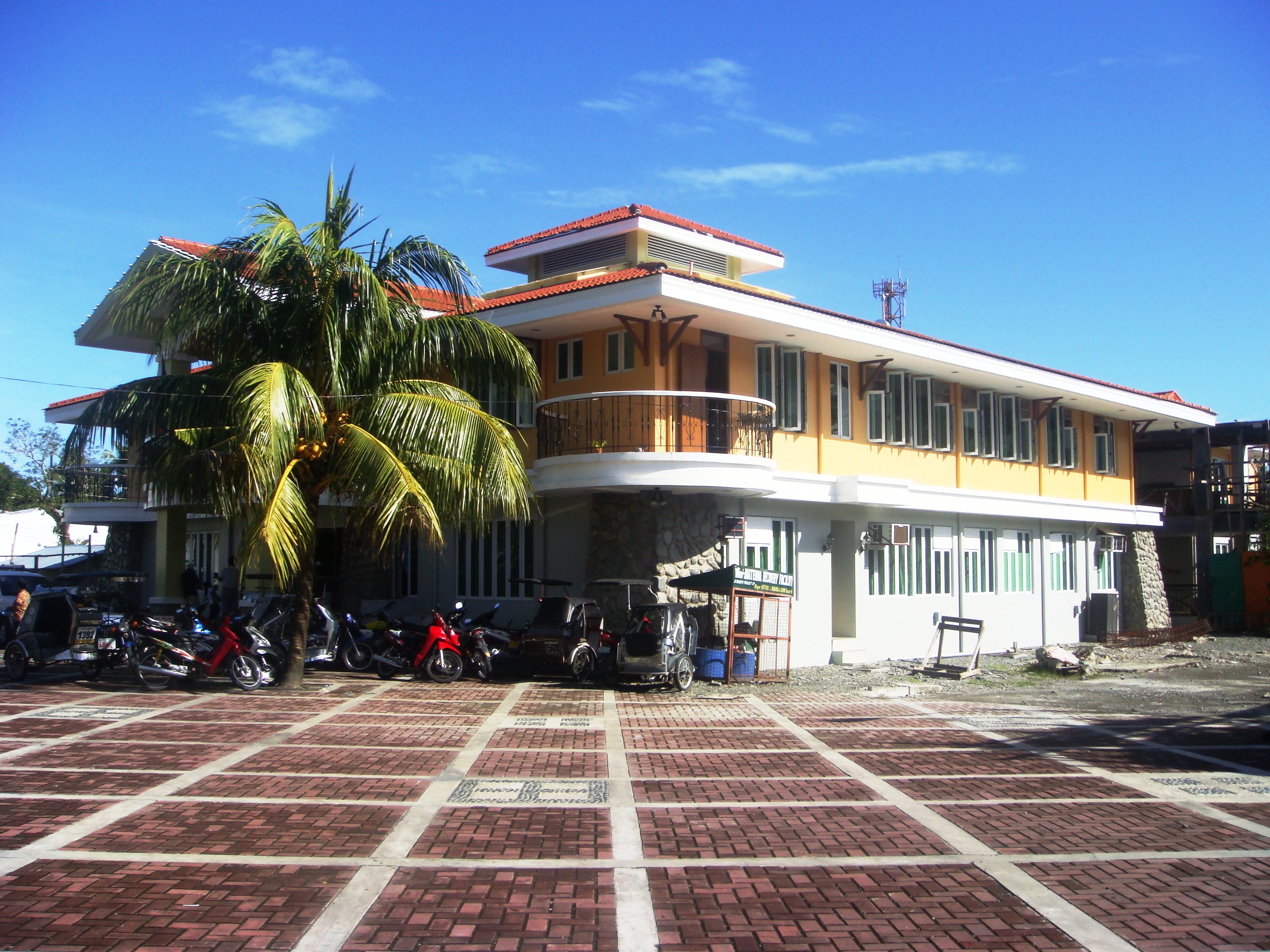
Baler Municipal Hall

The current officials of Baler, Aurora (as of June 30, 2022)

Name	Designation
Rhett Ronan Angara	Mayor
Bobong Ong	Vice Mayor
Pandus Valenzuela	Member, Sangguniang Bayan
Emmanuel Galban
Danilo Ong
Carlito Morillo
Ellah Cherryl Villacorte
Santino Rosauro Guerrero
Francisco Zubia III
Lysander Querijero

== Culture ==
Baler annually observes the Philippine–Spanish Friendship Day which commemorates the end of the Siege of Baler and celebrates the bilateral relations that have developed since then. It is held every June 30 and the rites which was first done in the provincial capital are also observed in other parts of the country, as well as parts of Spain.

Baler hosts a branch of the National Museum of the Philippines, which opened in 2026.

=== Surfing ===
Outer Banks, Labasin‑Sabang Beach

Baler is also a surfing spot and is recognized as the "Birthplace of Philippines Surfing" by law. American surfer Steve Scott popularized Baler as surfing destination after visiting it in 1972. The 1979 film Apocalypse Now despite being set in Vietnam is also credited for promoting the discipline. Cast members often surfed after filming, and the spot depicted in the film became known as Charlie's Point. Other surfing spot include Cemento and Sabang.

== Education ==
The Baler Schools District Office governs all educational institutions within the municipality. It oversees the management and operations of all private and public, from primary to secondary schools.

=== Secondary schools ===
- Aurora National High School
- Aurora National Science High School
- Baler Institute
- Baler National High School
- Baler Stand Alone Senior High School
- Calabuanan National High School
- Carmen T. Valenzuela Integrated School
- Lyceum of the East
- Mariano L. Sindac Integrated School
- Obligacion Integrated School

=== Higher educational institutions ===
- Aurora State College of Technology
- Mount Carmel College of Baler
- School of Health Sciences, campus Baler, University of the Philippines Manila

== Media ==
Baler is home to one TV station, GMA 5 Baler, and five radio stations, all in the FM band.

== Notable personalities ==
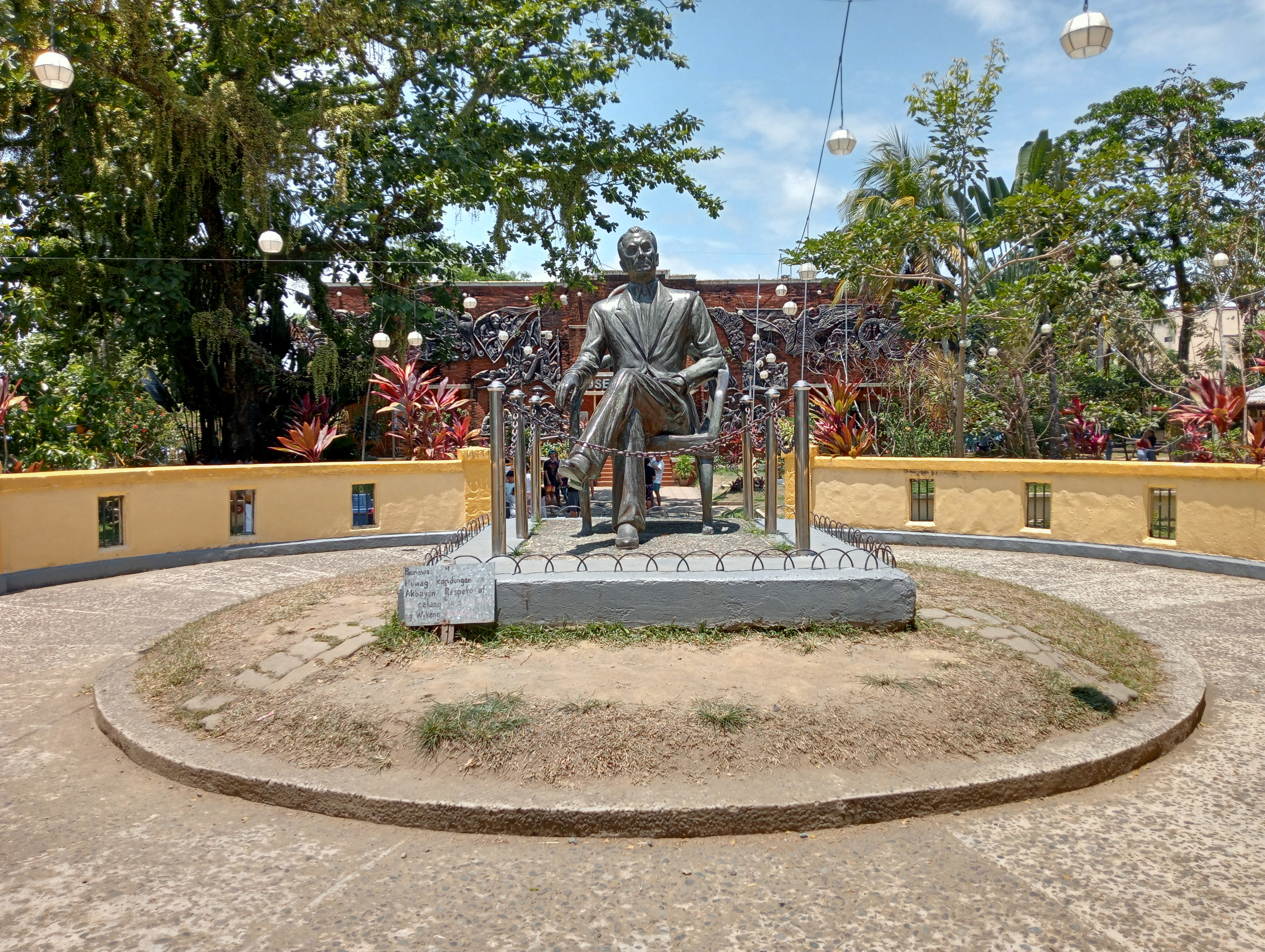
Manuel Luis Quezon Monument in Baler, Aurora

- Manuel L. Quezon, first president of the Commonwealth of the Philippines
- Aurora Quezon, former first lady of the Philippines, wife of President Manuel L. Quezon
- Eunice Pablo Guerrero-Cucueco, the first female governor of Aurora province
- Edgardo Angara, former President of the Senate of the Philippines, former University of the Philippines president and longest-serving senator in the Philippines
- Bella Angara, the first and currently only female majority floor leader of the House of Representatives of the Philippines
- Sonny Angara, current Secretary of Education and former Philippine Senator
- John Arcilla, veteran actor
- Arvin Amatorio, attorney and politician, the mayor of Bergenfield, New Jersey

== Gallery ==
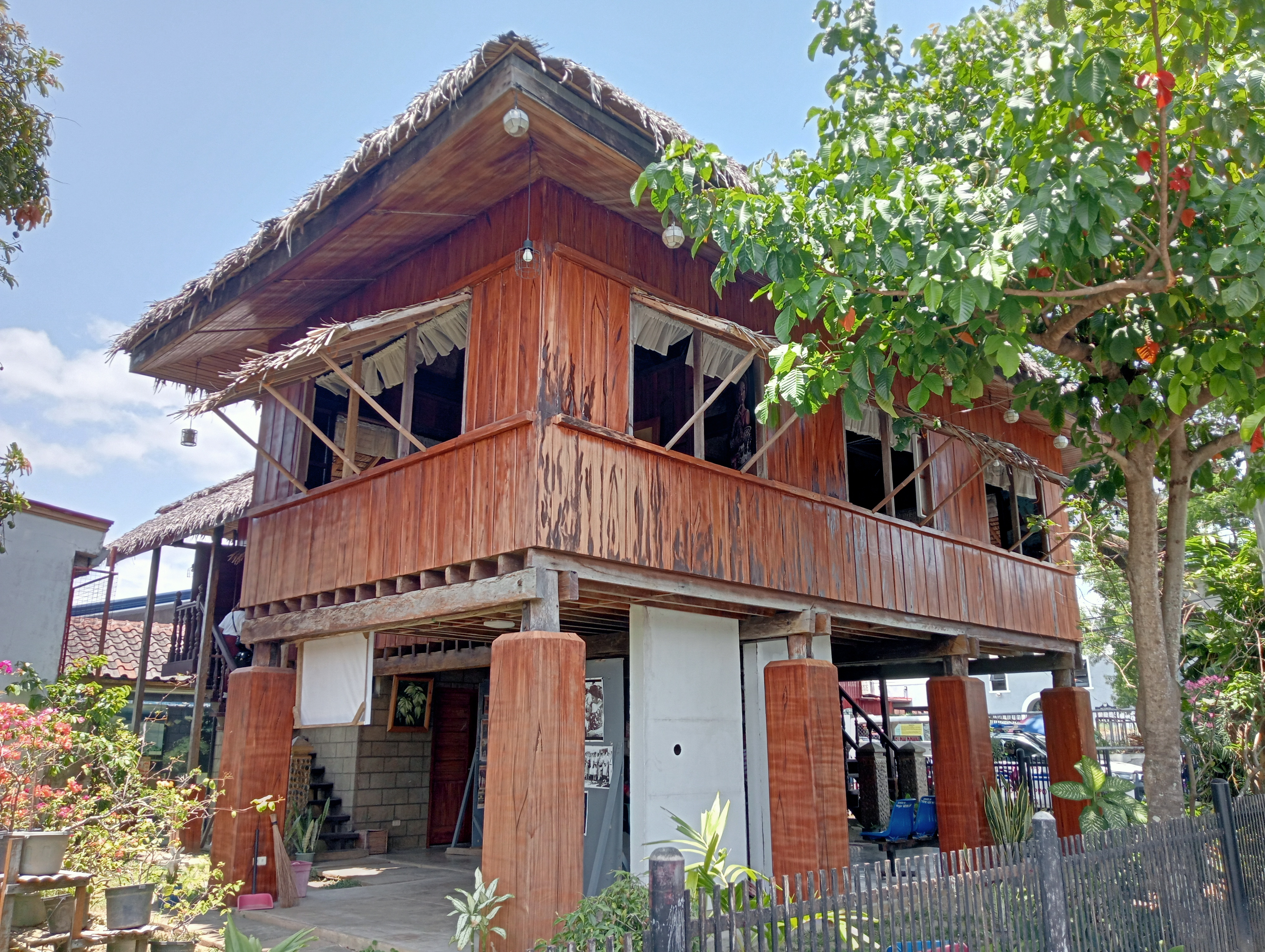
Doña Aurora Aragon-Quezon House

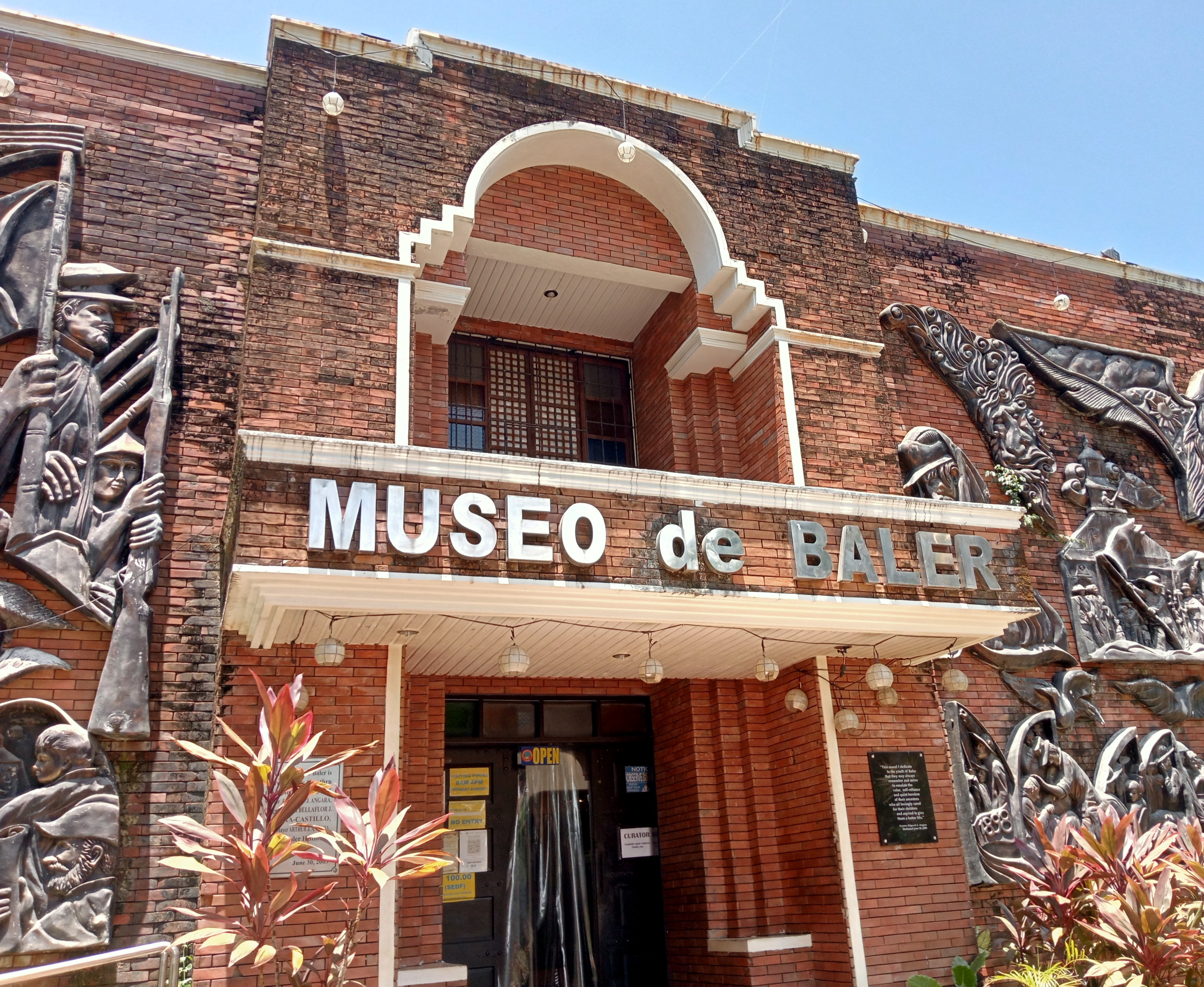
Museo de Baler

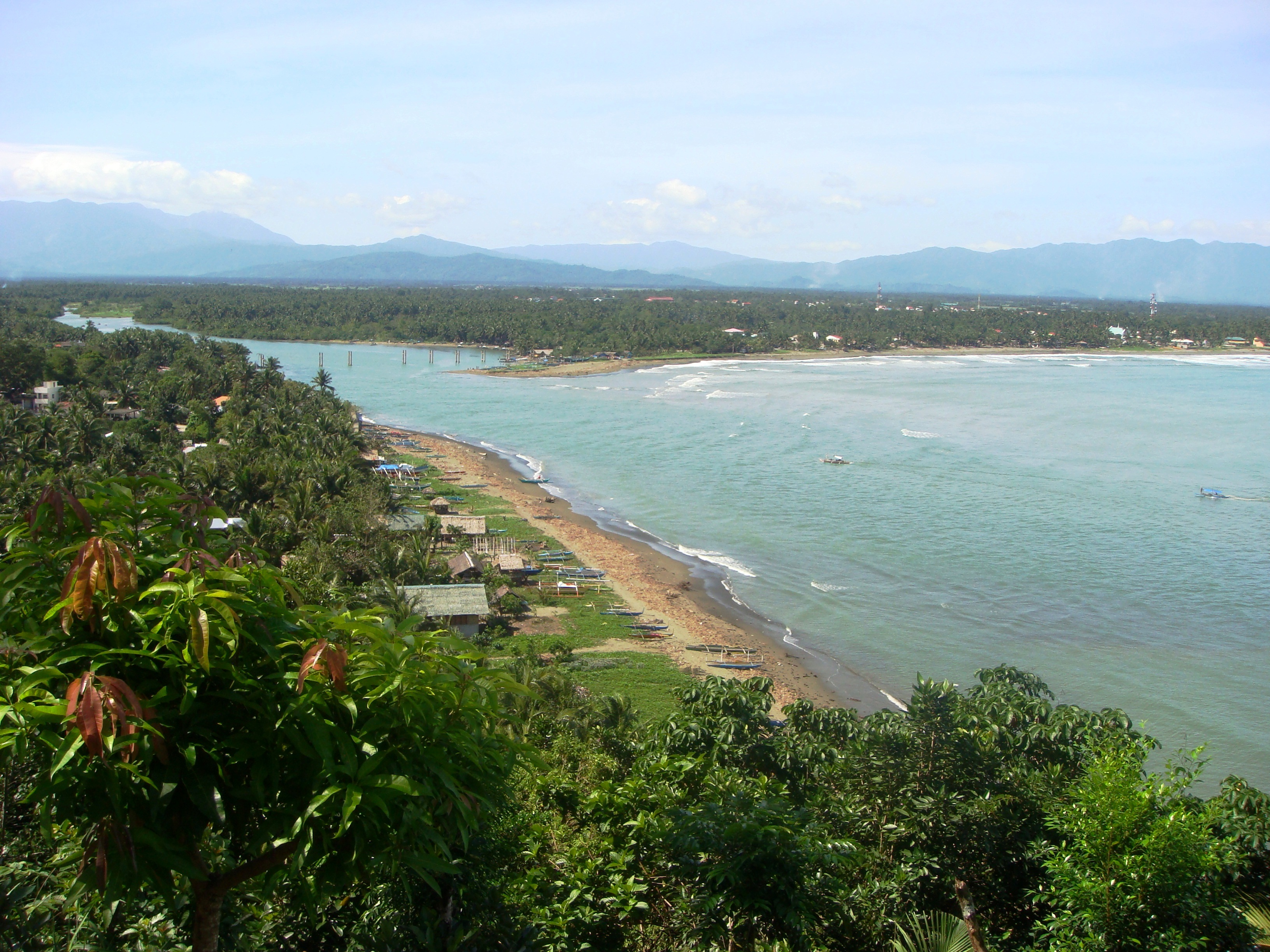
View of Baler Bay from Ermita Hill

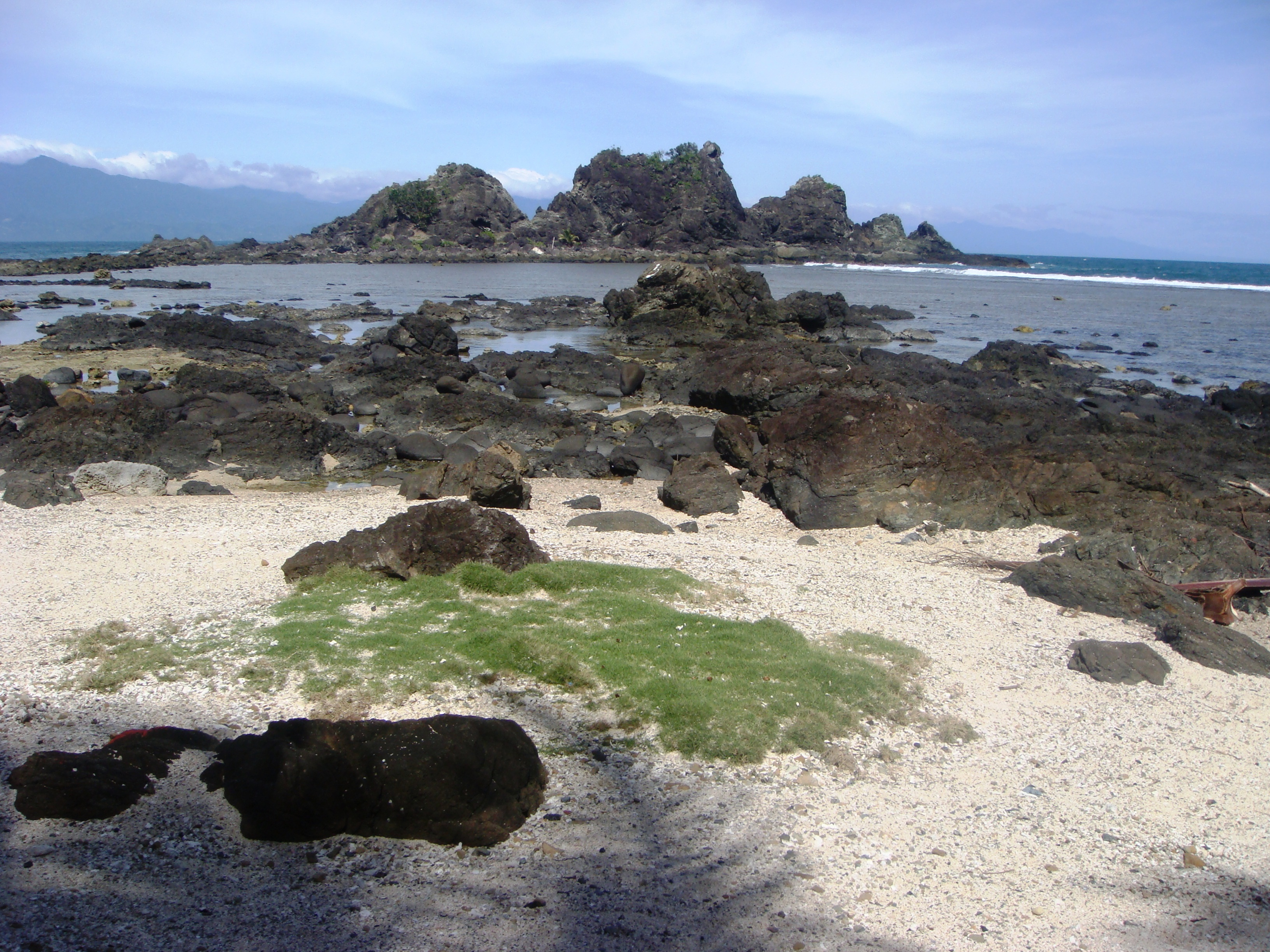
Rocky islets in Diguisit Bay

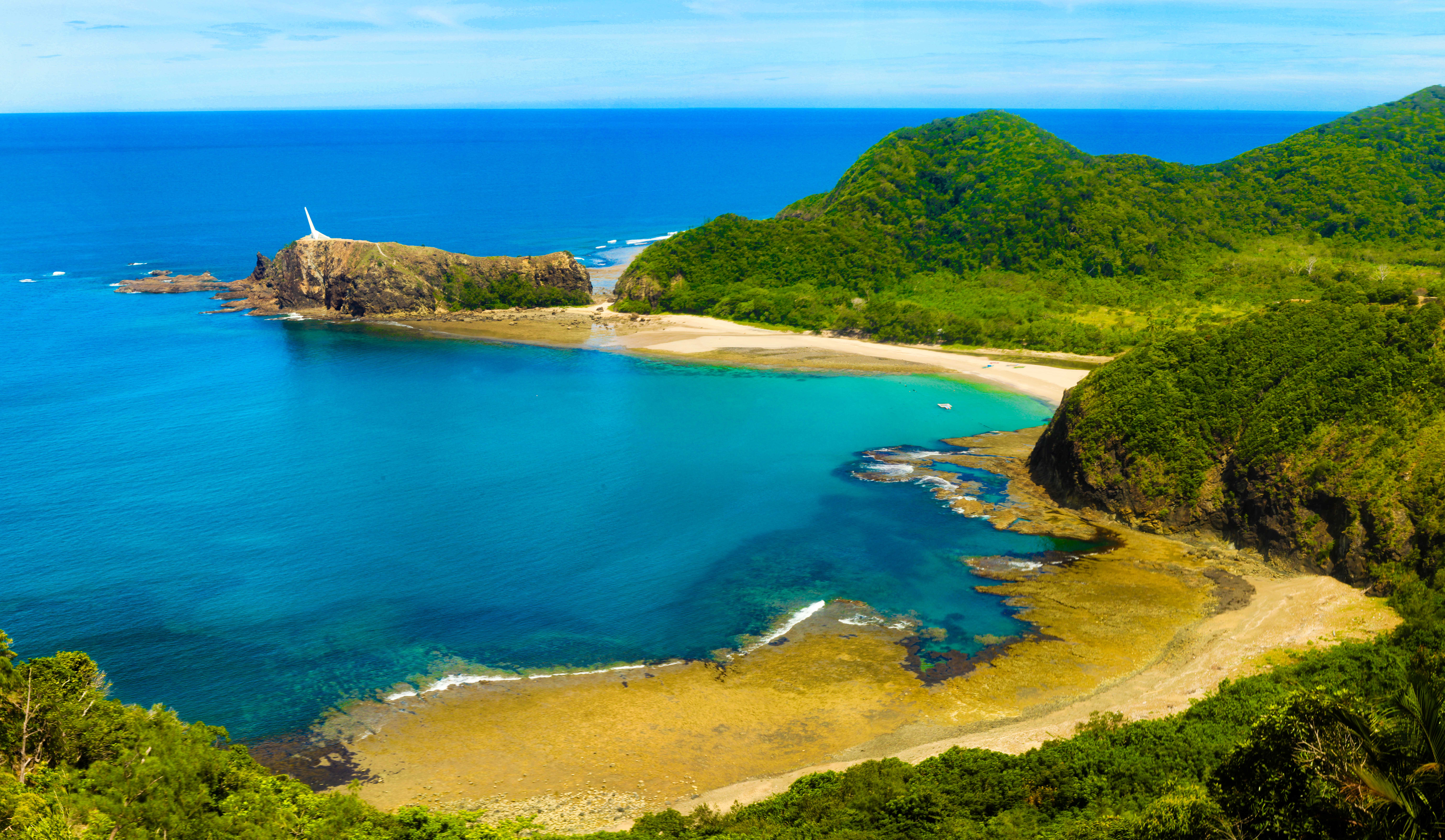
Dicasalarin Cove
