= Baler Bay =

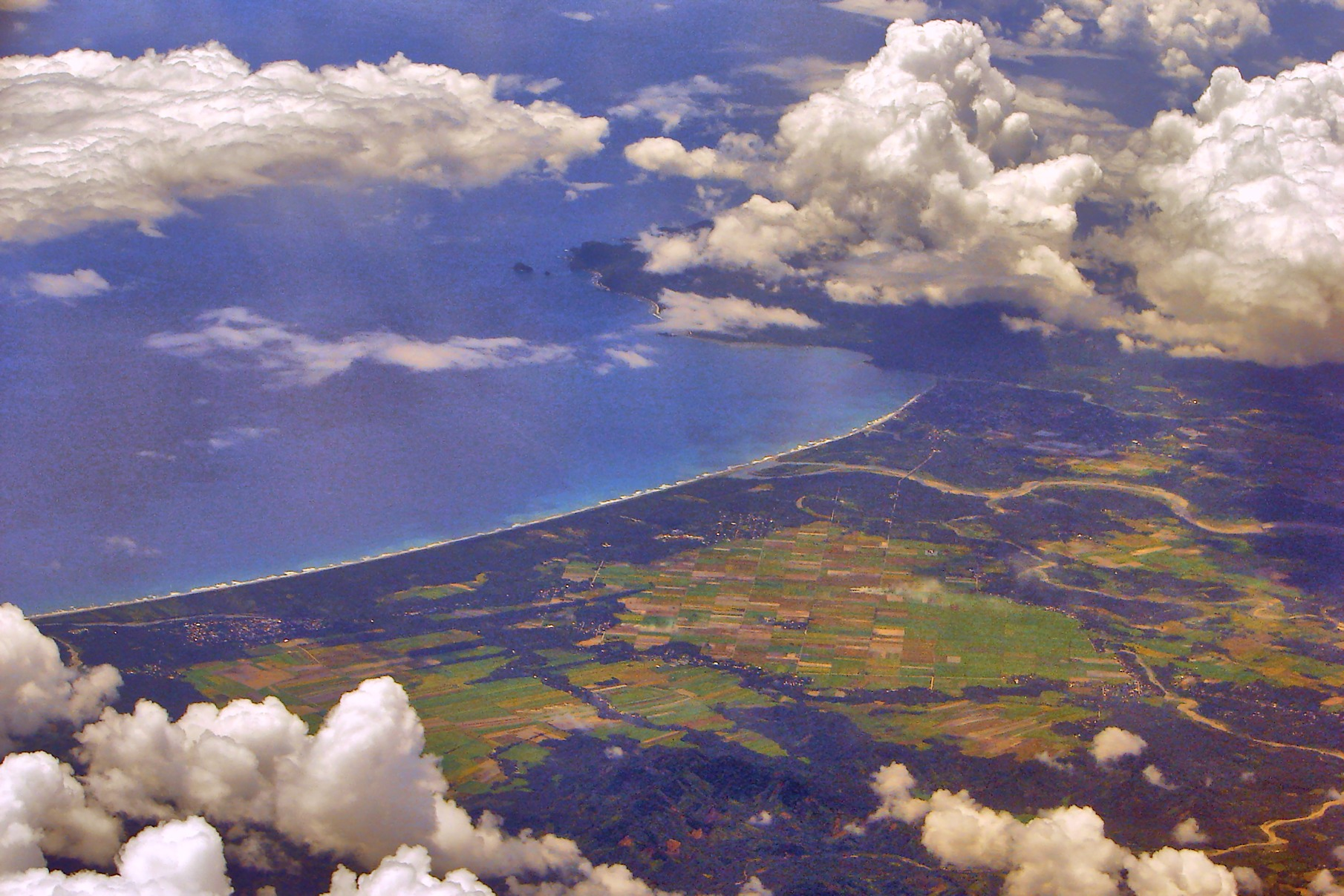
- Aerial view of the bay

- Location in Luzon Location in the Philippines
- Location: Luzon Island, Philippines
- Coordinates: 15°51′16.92″N 121°35′51.86″E
- Type: bay
- Part of: Philippine Sea
- Settlements: Baler; Casiguran; Dinalungan; Dipaculao

Baler Bay (/bɑːˈlɛr/, /bɒˈlɛr/, /bʌˈlɛər/, bah-LAIR; [bɐˈleɾ]) is a bay in the northeastern portion of Luzon island in the Philippines. It is an extension of the Philippine Sea and bordered by four municipalities of Aurora province.

From mid September to early March, the bay is known for its great surfing conditions. The movie Apocalypse Now, which was filmed there in 1976, introduced the sport to the area, and its production crew even left behind several surfboards for the locals to use. Since 1997, the bay has been home to the annual Aurora Surfing Cup. During the other months of the year, it is ideal for snorkeling, windsurfing and diving.

== Gallery ==
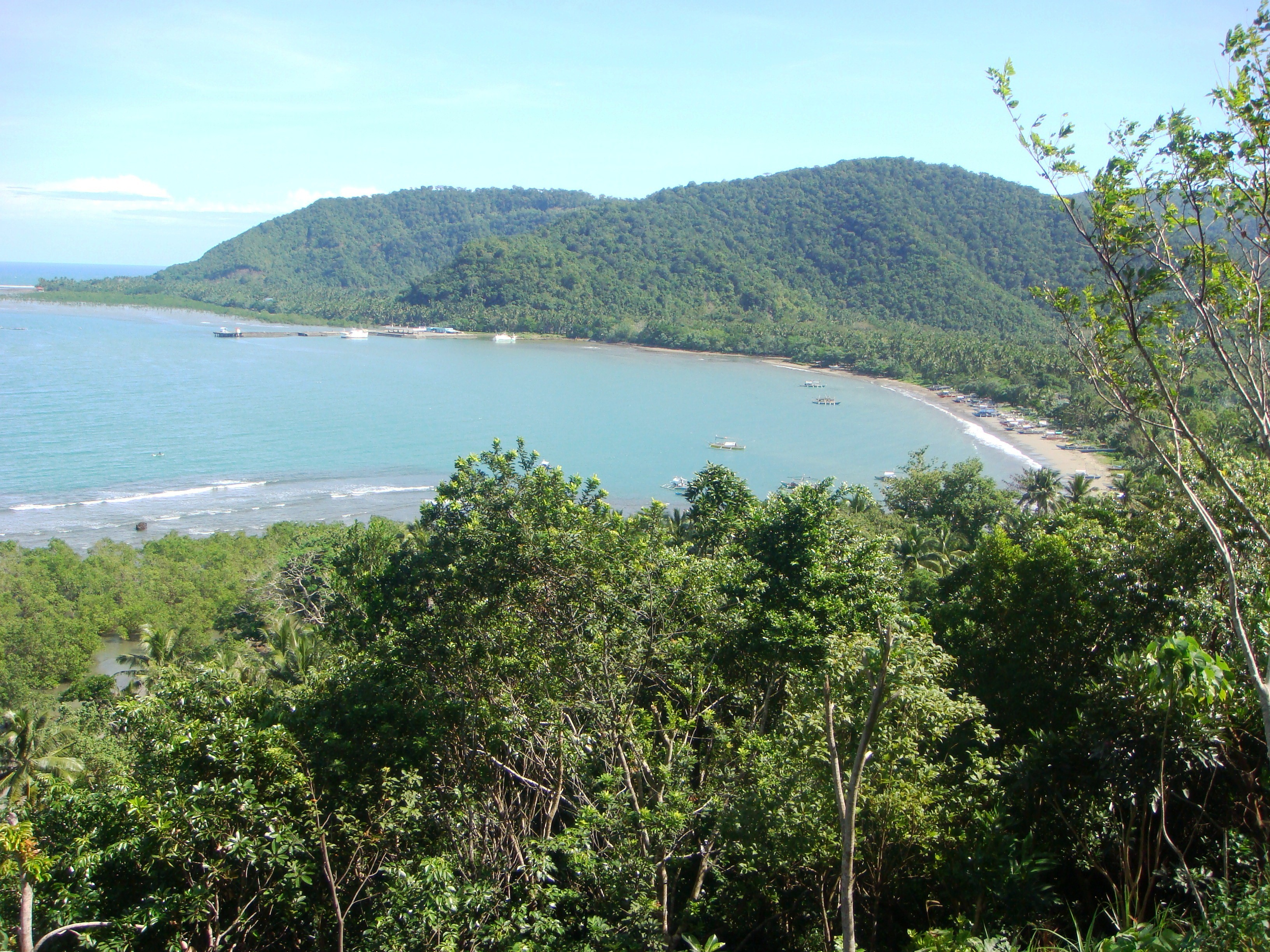
Panoramic Overview of the Bay from Ermita Hill Park deck (plateau at Zabali, Baler, Aurora, overlooking the Pacific Ocean, Baler Fishport, Baler town, Sabang Beach & delta, and Dimadimalangat islet)

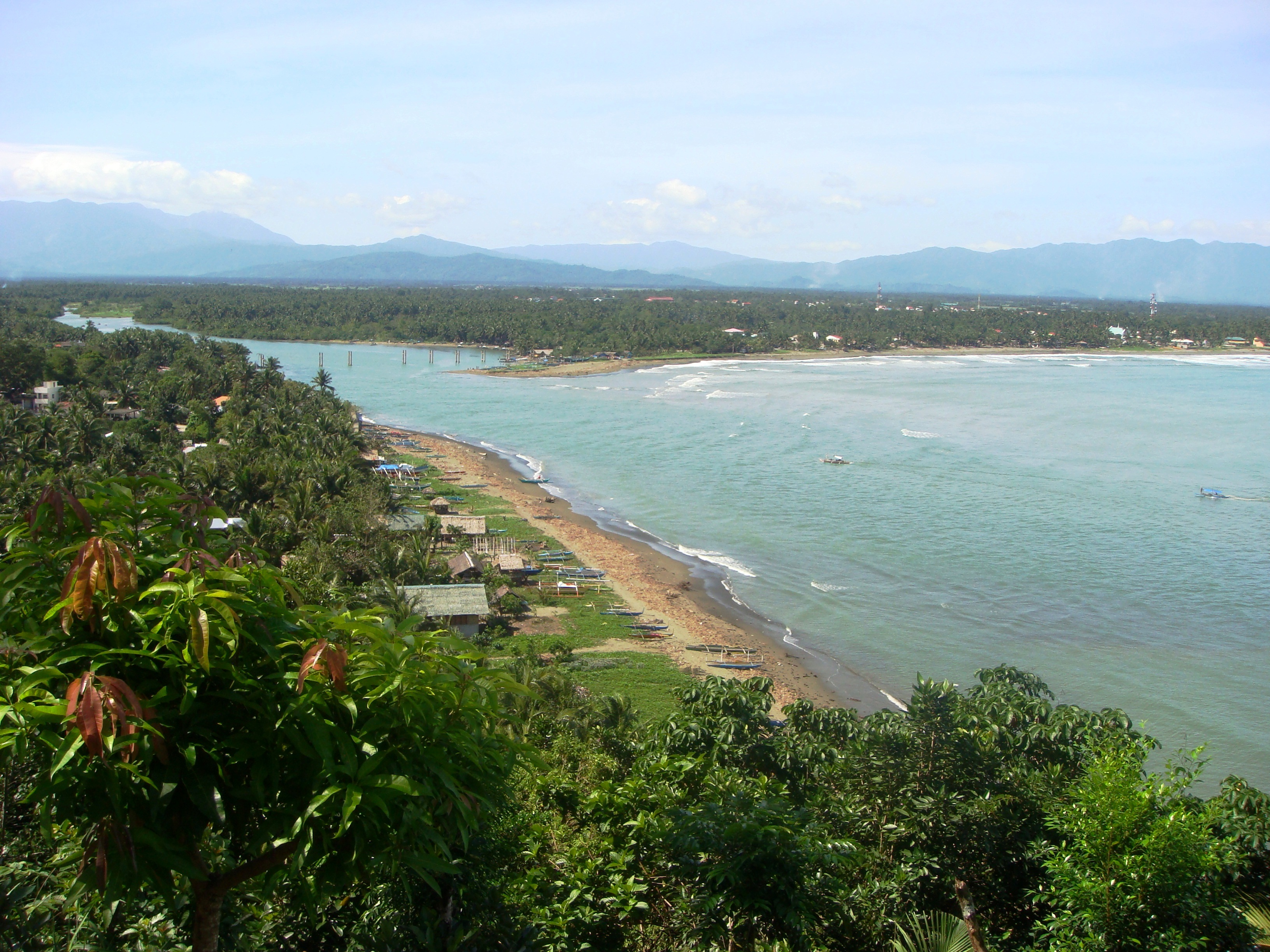
Another view of the Bay from Ermita Hill

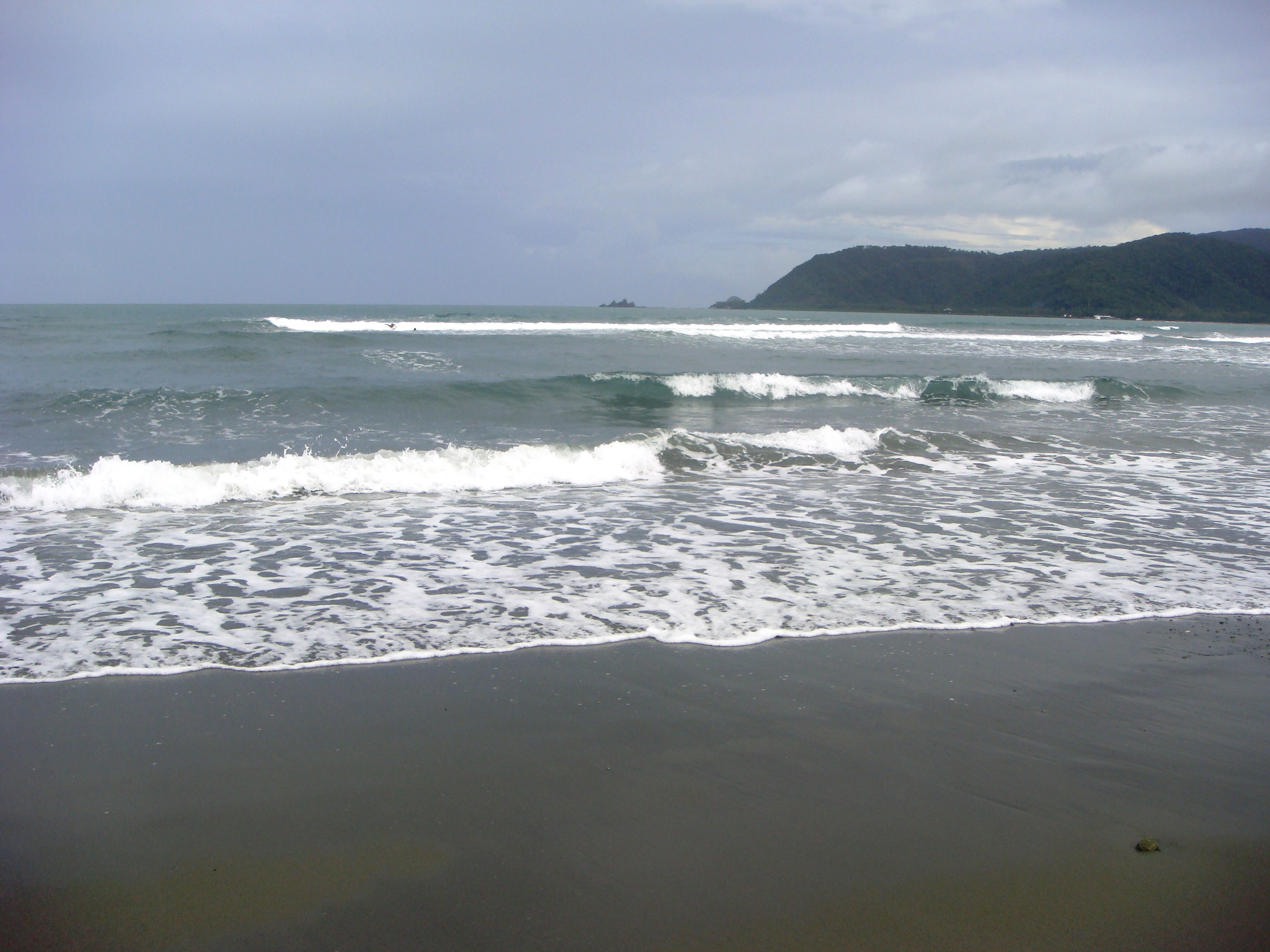
Baler Bay viewed from Outer Banks popular Labasin-Sabang Beach (Sitio Labasin, Sabang Baler, Aurora)
