= Pambata =

Children's magazine from the Philippines

- Categories: Magazine
- Frequency: Bimonthly
- Publisher: Communication Foundation for Asia
- First issue: 1979
- Country: Philippines
- Language: English/Filipino
- Website: http://cfamedia.org/

The Pambata is a children's magazine published since 1979 by the Communication Foundation for Asia (CFA) founded by Rev. Cornelio Lagerwey, a Dutch missionary. Its office is located in Santa Mesa, Manila, Philippines. It is an academic supplement in the grade schools for such subjects as science, mathematics, English and social sciences. As such, it provides information on science and technology, grammar and vocabulary, history and geography, health, mathematics, literature and the arts. It received special citations from the Philippine Board on Books for Young People (PBBY) in 1999 and the Catholic Mass Media Awards (CMMA) in 2000. Its sister publications are Gospel Komiks, English and Filipino editions, Baby Jesus for pre-elementary and kindergarten pupils, Jesus for primary school students, Gospel Komiks Magazine for young people, and Gospel Now for high school and early college students.
