= 2025 Aurora local elections =

2025 Aurora gubernatorial election
- May 12, 2025
- Gubernatorial election
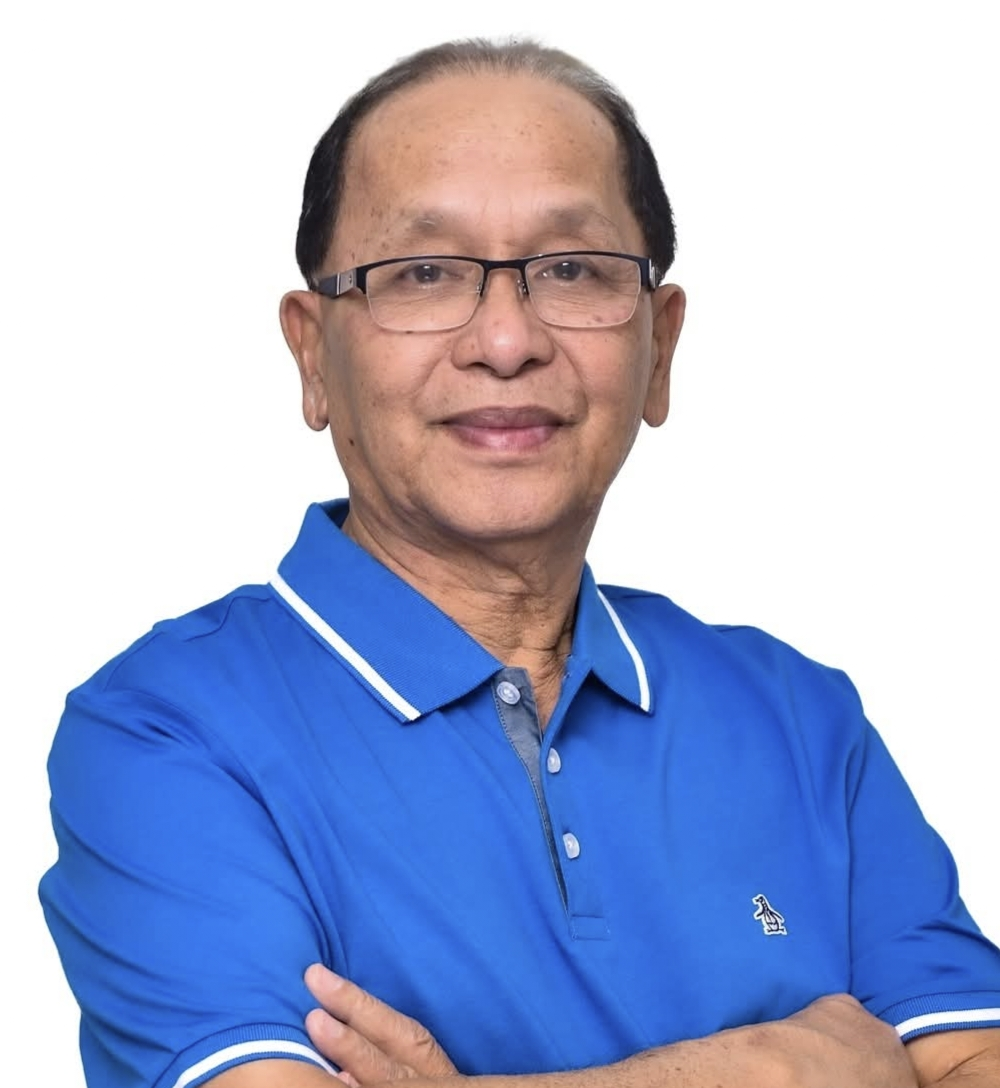

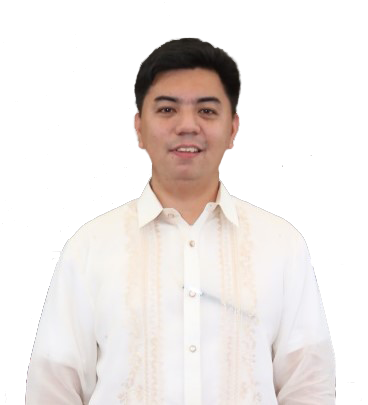
Candidate	Reynante Tolentino	Christian Noveras
Party	LDP	PFP
Running mate	Isidro Galban	Tin Tin Noveras
Popular vote	67,827	53,829
Percentage	55.75%	44.25%
Governor before election
Christian Noveras
PFP
Elected Governor
Reynate Tolentino
LDP
- Vice gubernatorial election
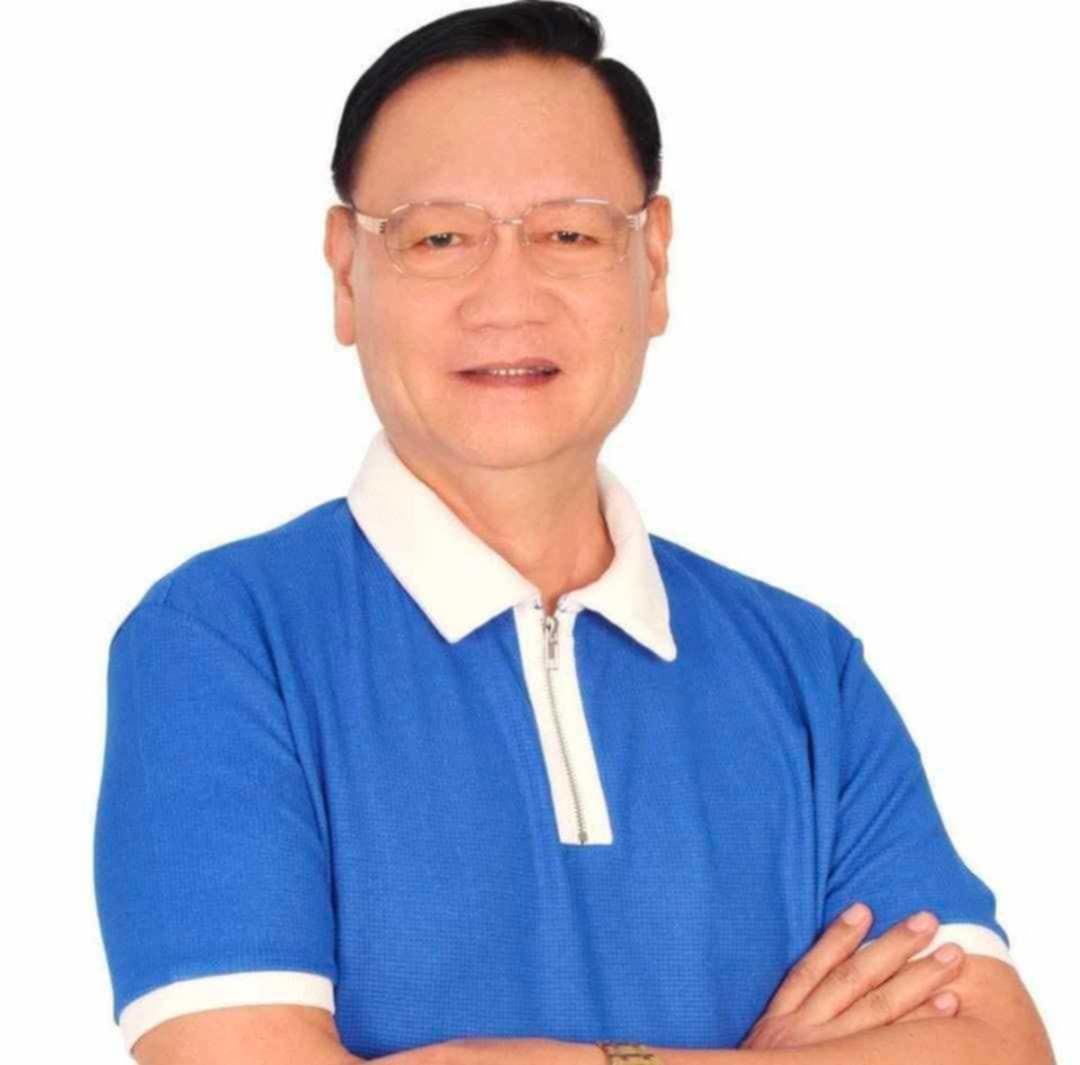
		PFP
Candidate	Isidro Galban	Tin Tin Noveras
Party	LDP	PFP
Popular vote	58,962	57,960
Percentage	50.43%	49.57%
Vice Governor before election
Jennifer Araña
PFP
Elected Vice Governor
Sid Galban
LDP
- Provincial Board election
- 10 out of 14 seats in the Aurora Provincial Board; 8 seats needed for a majority
Party	Current seats
LDP	3
Lakas	1
Nacionalista	1
PDP	1
Vacant	2

The 2025 Aurora local elections were held in Aurora on May 12, 2025, as part of the 2025 Philippine general election. Aurora voters elected a governor, a vice governor, and 10 out of 14 members of the Aurora Provincial Board.

== Governor ==
Incumbent Christian Noveras (Partido Federal ng Pilipinas) is running for reelection after being elected under PDP–Laban in 2022 with 62.78% of the vote. On December 13, 2023, the Office of the Ombudsman dismissed Noveras over the use of government resources for his campaign in the 2022 election. Reynante Tolentino became governor on April 24, 2024. On October 10, 2024, Noveras was reinstated after the Court of Appeals overturned his dismissal.

=== Candidates ===
The following candidates were included in the ballot:

No.	Candidate	Party
1	Christian Noveras (incumbent)	PFP
2	Reynante Tolentino	LDP

=== Results ===
Candidate	Party	Votes	%
Reynante Tolentino	LDP	67,827	55.75
Christian Noveras (incumbent)	PFP	53,829	44.25
Total		121,656	100.00
LDP gain from PFP			
Source: https://2025electionresults.comelec.gov.ph/coc-result

== Vice governor ==
Incumbent Jennifer Araña (Partido Federal ng Pilipinas) ran for the Aurora Provincial Board in the 2nd provincial district. Araña became vice governor on April 24, 2024, after Reynante Tolentino became governor upon Christian Noveras's dismissal.

=== Candidates ===
The following candidates were included in the ballot:

No.	Candidate	Party
1	Sid Galban	Laban ng Demokratikong Pilipino
2	Tin Tin Noveras	Partido Federal ng Pilipinas

=== Results ===
Candidate	Party	Votes	%
Sid Galban	Laban ng Demokratikong Pilipino	58,962	50.43
Tin Tin Noveras	Partido Federal ng Pilipinas	57,960	49.57
Total		116,922	100.00
Laban ng Demokratikong Pilipino gain from Partido Federal ng Pilipinas			
Source: https://2025electionresults.comelec.gov.ph/coc-result

== Provincial Board ==
The Aurora Provincial Board is composed of 13 board members, 10 of whom are then elected.

=== Retiring and term-limited board members ===
The following board members retired:

- Annabelle Tangson (Nacionalista Party, 1st provincial district)

The following board members were term-limited:

- Butch Bautista (Lakas, 1st provincial district)
- Santy Palmero (LDP, 1st provincial district)

=== Vacancies ===
- Reynante Tolentino (Laban ng Demokratikong Pilipino, 2nd provincial district), assumed office as vice governor on September 6, 2023, after Gerardo Noveras was disqualified.
- Jennifer Araña (PDP–Laban, 2nd provincial district), assumed office as vice governor on April 24, 2024, after Reynante Tolentino became acting governor upon Christian Noveras' dismissal.

=== Overview ===
Party	Votes	%	Seats
Laban ng Demokratikong Pilipino	238,271	62.96	6
Partido Federal ng Pilipinas	91,528	24.18	2
Nacionalista Party	30,952	8.18	1
Independent	17,720	4.68	1
Ex officio seats			3
Total	378,471	100.00	13

=== 1st provincial district ===
Aurora's 1st provincial district consists of the municipalities of Baler, Dingalan, Maria Aurora and San Luis. Four board members were elected from this provincial district.

==== Candidates ====
The following candidates were included in the ballot:

No.	Candidate	Party
1	Sherwin Amatorio	Partido Federal ng Pilipinas
2	Patrick Angara	Laban ng Demokratikong Pilipino
3	Jake Galban (incumbent)	Laban ng Demokratikong Pilipino
4	Gliceria Geneta	Partido Federal ng Pilipinas
5	Bobong Ong	Laban ng Demokratikong Pilipino
6	Norma Palmero	Laban ng Demokratikong Pilipino
7	Nano Tangson	Nacionalista Party

==== Results ====
Candidate	Party	Votes	%
Patrick Angara	Laban ng Demokratikong Pilipino	47,737	20.38
Bobong Ong	Laban ng Demokratikong Pilipino	43,972	18.77
Jake Galban (incumbent)	Laban ng Demokratikong Pilipino	40,986	17.50
Norma Palmero	Laban ng Demokratikong Pilipino	36,397	15.54
Nano Tangson	Nacionalista Party	30,952	13.21
Sherwin Amatorio	Partido Federal ng Pilipinas	22,769	9.72
Gliceria Gineta	Partido Federal ng Pilipinas	11,454	4.89
Total		234,267	100.00
Source: https://2025electionresults.comelec.gov.ph/coc-result

=== 2nd provincial district ===
Aurora's 2nd provincial district consists of the municipalities of Casiguran, Dilasag, Dinalungan and Dipaculao. Four board members were elected from this provincial district.

==== Candidates ====
The following candidates were included in the ballot:

No.	Candidate	Party
1	Menard Amansec	Laban ng Demokratikong Pilipino
2	Jennifer Araña	Partido Federal ng Pilipinas
3	Tho Miran	Laban ng Demokratikong Pilipino
4	Joseph Molina	Partido Federal ng Pilipinas
5	Totoy Noveras Jr.	Partido Federal ng Pilipinas
6	Lito Pascua (incumbent)	Laban ng Demokratikong Pilipino
7	Percy Salamera	Partido Federal ng Pilipinas
8	Ena Tablang	Independent
9	Yam Tolentino	Laban ng Demokratikong Pilipino

==== Results ====
Candidate	Party	Votes	%
Yam Tolentino	Laban ng Demokratikong Pilipino	23,584	16.35
Menard Amansec	Laban ng Demokratikong Pilipino	20,703	14.36
Jennifer Arana	Partido Federal ng Pilipinas	20,692	14.35
Ena Tablang	Independent	17,720	12.29
Totoy Noveras Jr.	Partido Federal ng Pilipinas	13,219	9.17
Lito Pascua (incumbent)	Laban ng Demokratikong Pilipino	12,715	8.82
Percy Salamera	Partido Federal ng Pilipinas	12,600	8.74
Tho Miran	Laban ng Demokratikong Pilipino	12,177	8.44
Joseph Molina	Partido Federal ng Pilipinas	10,794	7.49
Total		144,204	100.00
Source: https://2025electionresults.comelec.gov.ph/coc-result
