= Eunice Guerrero-Cucueco =

Filipino physician (1949–1991)

The Honourable Eunice Pablo Guerrero-Cucueco

3rd Governor of Aurora
- In office February 2, 1988 – February 12, 1991
- Vice Governor: Edgardo L. Ong
- Preceded by: Isaias M. Noveras
- Succeeded by: Edgardo L. Ong

Personal details
- Born: Eunice Pablo Guerrero; September 16, 1949
- Died: February 12, 1991 (aged 41)
- Occupation: Politician

Eunice Guerrero-Cucueco (born Eunice Pablo Guerrero; September 16, 1949 – February 12, 1991) was a Filipino politician, the first woman to serve as the governor of Aurora Province, Central Luzon, Philippines. from 1988 until her death in 1991 in a plane crash. She was succeeded by Vice Governor Edgardo L. Ong.

== Death and legacy ==
She was killed in the crash of a Cessna plane in the village of Dicagum in the Sierra Madre mountains on February 12, 1991.

A non-governmental organization (NGO) is named after her, the Governor Eunice Guerrero-Cucueco Foundation, Inc.

Political offices
Preceded by Isaias M. Noveras	Governor of Aurora; 1988–1991	Succeeded by Edgardo L. Ong
