= Galban =

Galban is a surname. Notable people with the surname include:

- Edel Alvarez Galban (born 1967), Cuban American visual artist
- Isidro Galban, Filipino politician
- Manuel Galbán (1931–2011), Cuban musician
- María Galvany (1875–1927), Spanish operatic soprano. Originally born María Galbán Martínez

== See also ==
- Galbani
