= Reynante Tolentino =

Filipino politician (1951–2025)

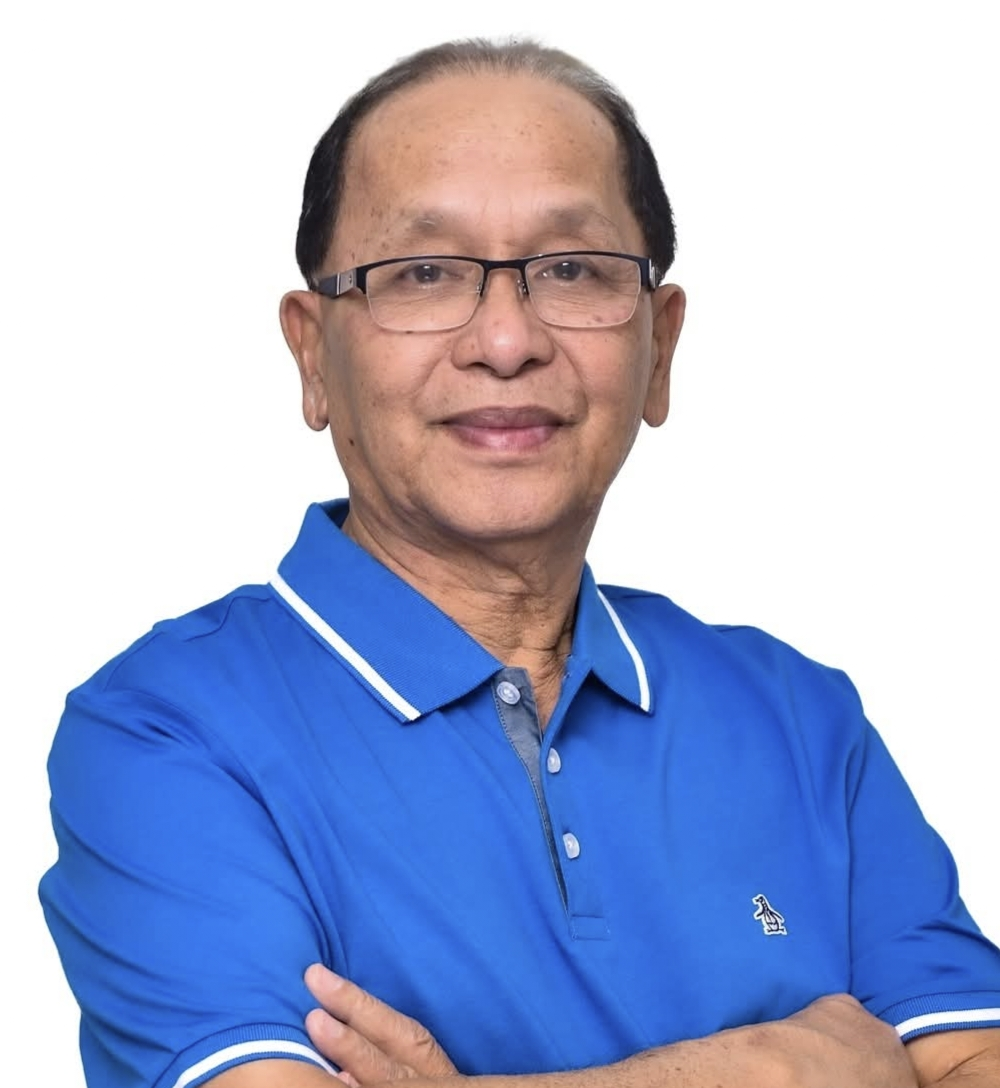
- Official Portrait of Gov. Tolentino 2025

9th Governor of Aurora
- In office February 7, 2024 – September 22, 2025
- Vice Governor: Jennifer Arana (2024–2025); Isidro P. "Sid" Galban (June–September 2025)
- Preceded by: Christian Noveras
- Succeeded by: Isidro P. "Sid" Galban

Vice Governor of Aurora
- In office September 6, 2023 – February 7, 2024
- Governor: Christian Noveras
- Preceded by: Gerardo Noveras
- Succeeded by: Jennifer Arana

Member of the Aurora Provincial Board from the 2nd district
- In office June 30, 2022 – September 6, 2023
- In office June 30, 2016 – June 30, 2019

Mayor of Dipaculao
- In office June 30, 2007 – June 30, 2016

Member of the Dipaculao Municipal Council
- In office June 30, 2004 – June 30, 2007

Personal details
- Born: Reynante Amansec Tolentino; March 29, 1951 Dipaculao, Quezon, Philippines
- Died: September 22, 2025 (aged 74) Baler, Aurora, Philippines
- Party: LDP (2004–2025)
- Spouse: Norma Kuan
- Occupation: Politician
- Profession: Civil engineer

Reynante Amansec Tolentino (March 29, 1951 – September 22, 2025) was a Filipino politician and civil engineer who served as the 9th Governor of Aurora from February 7, 2024 until his death on September 22, 2025. He was a member of the Laban ng Demokratikong Pilipino (LDP).

== Life and career ==
Tolentino was elected as a provincial board member of Aurora from its 2nd district in 2016. He lost his reelection bid in 2019 but regained the position upon election in 2022.

Tolentino later became the province's vice governor after the disqualification of Gerardo Noveras on administrative charges in July 2023. In February 2024, he became acting governor after Christian Noveras was suspended. He became full-time governor after Noveras was finally ordered dismissed by the Ombudsman in April 2024. He took his oath of office before his brother, Danilo Tolentino, who is also the mayor of Dipaculao.

The Court of Appeals' Resolution of September 26 directed the immediate reinstatement of Christian Noveras, removing Tolentino from office. Tolentino later ran for governor of Aurora in 2025, and was elected, but died on September 22 that year. He was 74. His deputy, Isidro Galban succeeded Tolentino the following day.

Political offices
| Preceded by Christian Noveras | Governor of Aurora; 2024–2025 | Succeeded by Isidro P. Galban |
| Preceded by Gerardo Noveras | Vice Governor of Aurora; 2023–2024 | Succeeded by Jennifer Arana |
