= Aurora (province) =

Province in Central Luzon, Philippines

- Province
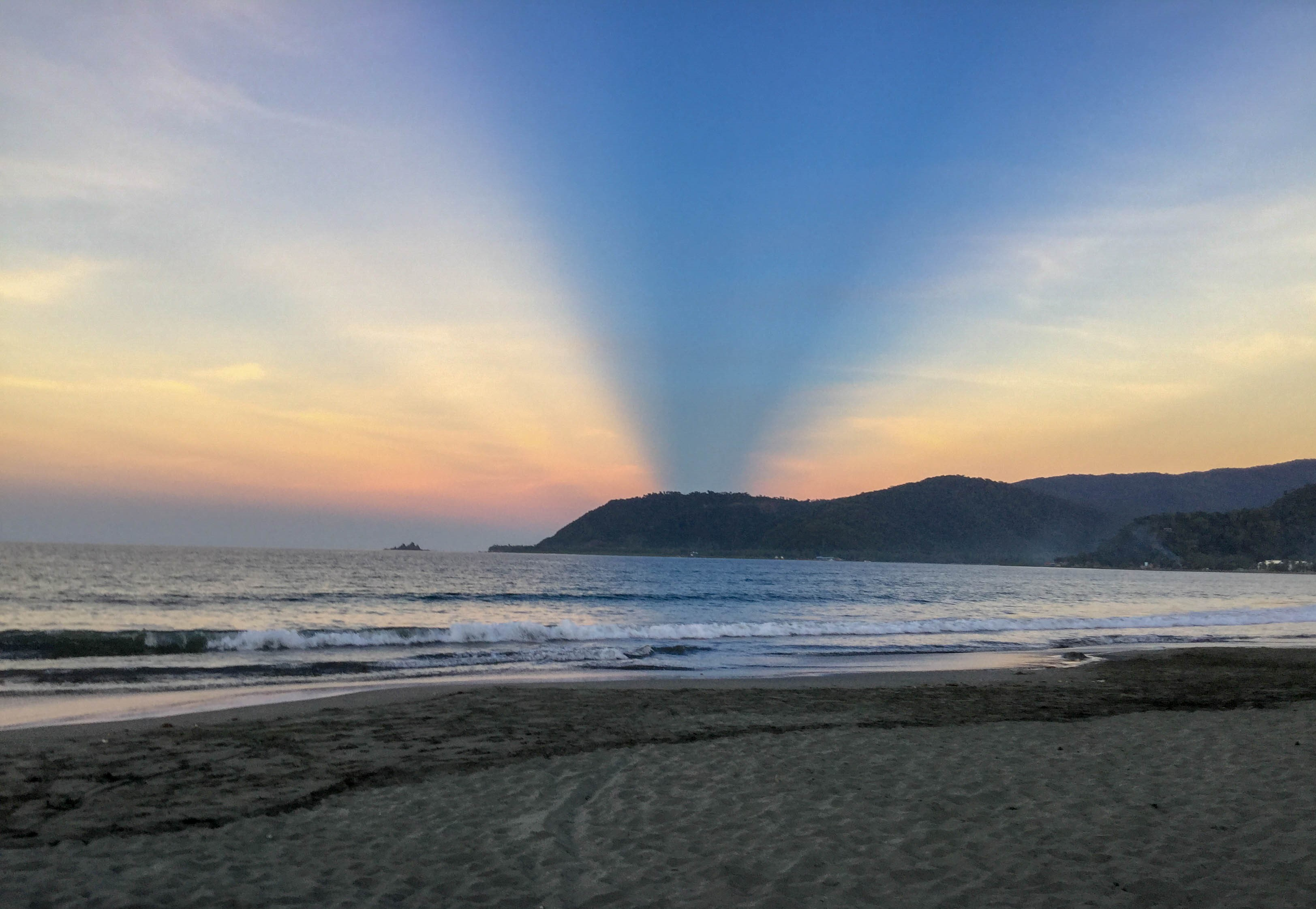
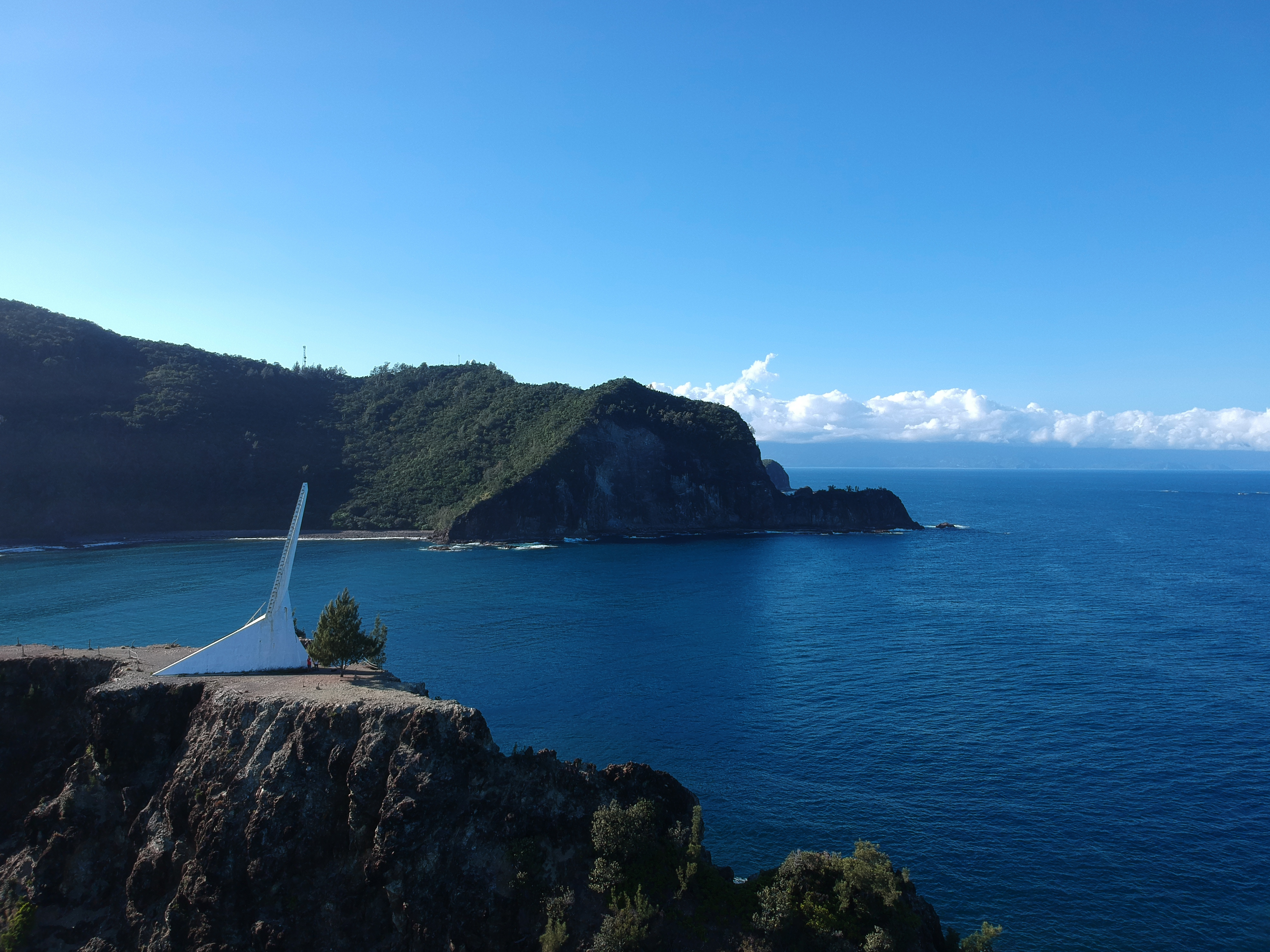
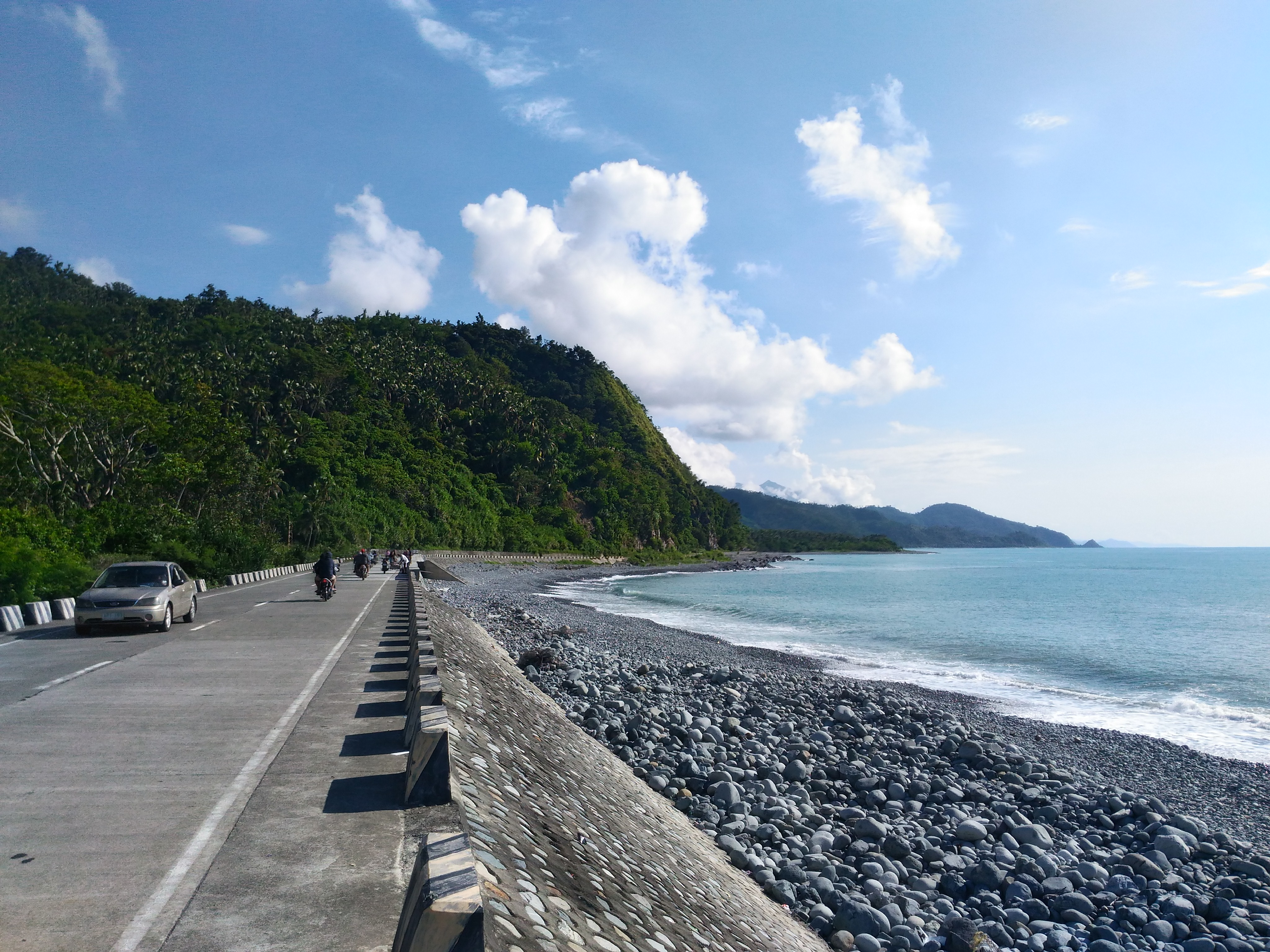
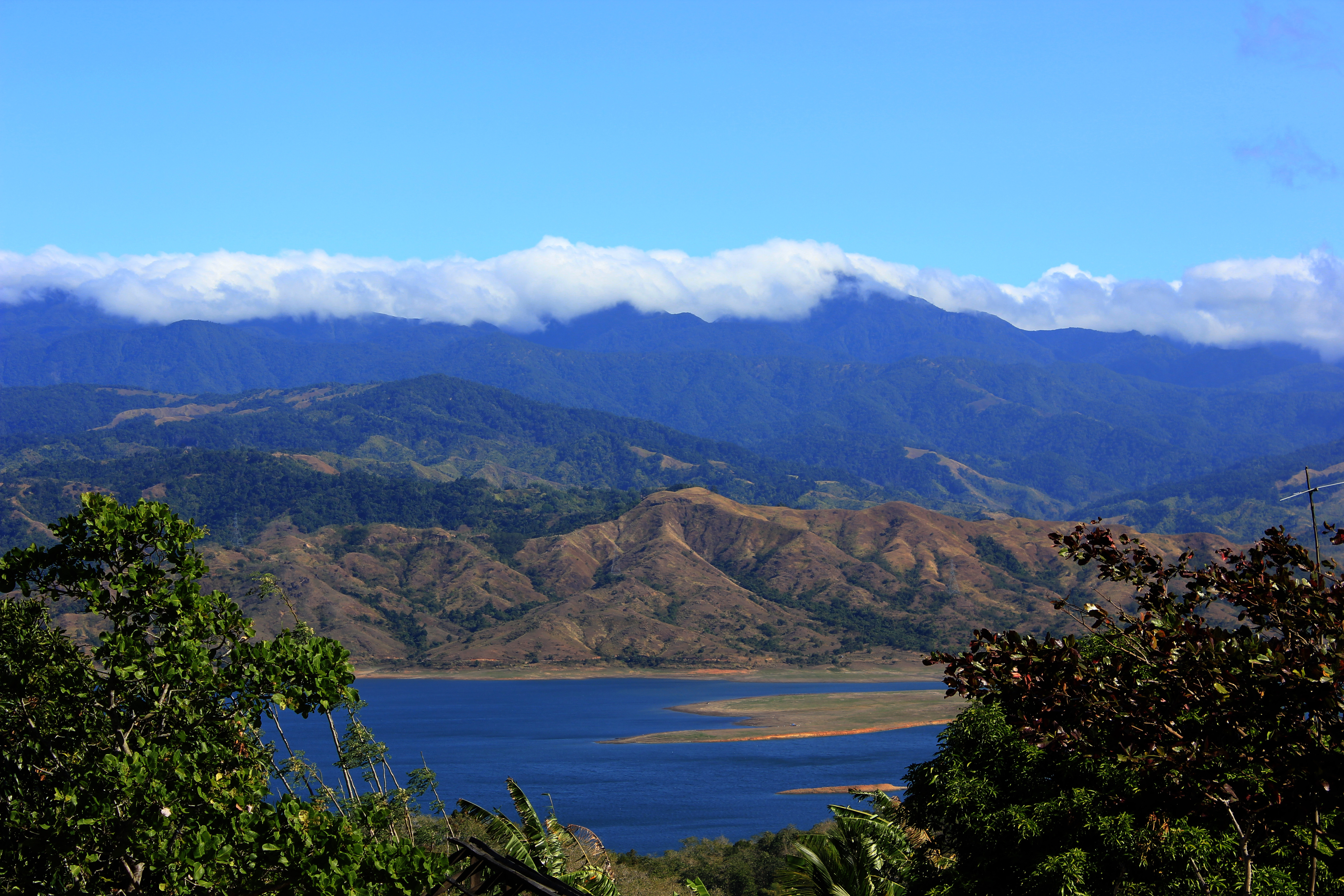
- (from top: left to right) Cuaresma Beach in Casiguran, Dicasalarin Cove in Baler, Ampere Beach in Dipaculao, Suclayin, Baler

- Flag Seal
- Nicknames: Land of the Golden Sunrise
- Location in the Philippines
- Interactive map of Aurora
- Coordinates: 15°53′N 121°33′E
- Country: Philippines
- Region: Central Luzon
- Founded: 1951 (as sub-province of Quezon)
- Province: 13 August 1979
- Named for: Aurora Quezon
- Capital: Baler
- Largest Municipality: Maria Aurora

Government
  - Governor: Isidro Galban (LDP)
  - Vice Governor: Patrick Alexis Angara (LDP)
  - Representative: Rommel T. Angara
  - Legislature: Aurora Provincial Board
  - Electorate: 157,240 voters (2025)

Area
  - Total: 3,147.32 km^{2} (1,215.19 sq mi)
  - Rank: 42nd out of 82
- Highest elevation (Mount Mingan): 1,901 m (6,237 ft)

Population (2024 census)
  - Total: 240,824
  - Rank: 70th out of 82
  - Density: 76.5172/km^{2} (198.179/sq mi)
  - Rank: 77th out of 82
  - Households: 49,066
- Demonyms: Auroran; Auroreño; Aurorano; Aurorense

Divisions
  - Independent cities: 0
  - Component cities: 0
  - Municipalities: 8: Baler; Casiguran; Dilasag; Dinalungan; Dingalan; Dipaculao; Maria Aurora; San Luis
  - Barangays: 151
  - Districts: Legislative district of Aurora

Economy
  - Income class: 2nd provincial income class
  - Poverty incidence: 11% (2023)
  - Revenue: ₱ 1,599 million (2024)
  - Assets: ₱ 5,197 million (2024)
  - Expenditure: ₱ 1,491 million (2024)
  - Liabilities: ₱ 1,068 million (2024)
- Time zone: UTC+8 (PST)
- PSGC: 037700000
- IDD : area code: +63 (0)42
- ISO 3166 code: PH-AUR
- Ethnic groups: Tagalog (53%); Ilocano (31%); Kasiguranin (5%); Bicolano (4%); Kankanaey (1%)
- Spoken languages: Tagalog; Ilocano; Kasiguranin; Filipino; English
- Website: www.aurora.gov.ph

Aurora, officially the Province of Aurora (Tagalog: Lalawigan ng Aurora; Ilocano: Probinsia ti Aurora; Spanish: Provincia de Aurora), is a province in the Philippines located in the eastern part of Central Luzon region, facing the Philippine Sea. Its capital is Baler and borders, clockwise from the south, the provinces of Quezon, Bulacan, Nueva Ecija, Nueva Vizcaya, Quirino, and Isabela. Maria Aurora is the only landlocked town in the province and yet, the most populous. It is the only province in Central Luzon that has no chartered cities.

Before 1979, Aurora was part of the province of Quezon. The province was named after Aurora Quezon, the wife of Manuel L. Quezon, the president of the Commonwealth of the Philippines, after whom the mother province was named.

== History ==
=== Spanish colonial era ===
In 1572, the Spanish explorer Juan de Salcedo became the first European to visit the region that would be known as Aurora while he was exploring the northern coast of Luzon. Salcedo reportedly visited the towns of Casiguran, Baler and Infanta. Baler and Casiguran were part of La Provincia de La Pampanga, which also included Pampanga, Bulacan, Nueva Écija, and Tarlac, and in 1591, the towns became part of Kalilayan, which included Nueva Écija, until Kalilayan changed its name to Tayabas in 1749, taken from the town of the same name.

In the early days of the Spanish colonial period, Aurora was ecclesiastically linked to Infanta, which today rests further south, in northern Quezon. The earliest missionaries in the province were the Franciscans, who had established missions in Baler and Casiguran in 1609. Due to lack of available personnel, the region was given to the jurisdiction of the Augustinians and Recollects in 1658, but was returned to the Friars Minor in 1703. Other early missions included Dipaculao, established in 1719, and Casiguran, in 1753.

In 1705, the Military Comandancia of Nueva Écija was created and was governed by Governor-General Fausto Cruzat y Góngora. It included huge swathes of Central Luzon, the Contracosta towns, as well as the Kalilayan area and Polillo Islands, however Nueva Écija was then still under La Pampanga province. Contracosta was the term for the east coast and included towns from Mauban, Binangonan de Lampon, to El Príncipe. Since the Contracosta and Kalilayan were part of La Laguna province at that time before these were annexed to Nueva Écija, they became jointly ruled by La Pampanga and La Laguna provinces. The Contracosta and Tayabas areas were jointly ruled by Tayabas and Pampanga, when Tayabas became independent from La Laguna in 1754.

On December 27, 1735, a powerful storm struck Baler and a tsunami (tromba marina) destroyed the old town located in present Barrio Sabang. Among the surviving clans were the Angaras, Bihasas, Bitongs, Lumasacs, Carrascos, and Pobletes who had swum to nearby Ermita Hill. A new community formed in what is now the Población of Baler, leaving "Kinagunasan," the place of devastation. A mural depicting the tsunami can be found in the Museo de Baler.

When Rafael María de Aguilar y Ponce de León took over as Governor-General of the Philippines, he decreed the separation of the military district of Nueva Écija from the province of Pampanga and became a regular province on April 25, 1801, including the town of Baler, acquired from Tayabas.

In 1818, Nueva Écija annexed the towns of Palanan from Isabela, as well as Baler, Casiguran, Infanta (formerly called Binangonan de Lampon) and Polillo Islands from Tayabas, and Cagayan, Nueva Vizcaya, Quirino, and part of Rizal. In 1853, the new military district of Tayabas was separated from Nueva Écija and included present-day Southern Quezon as well as present-day Aurora. In 1858, Binangonan de Lampon and the Polillo Islands were separated from Nueva Écija to form part of Infanta. Between 1855 and 1885, El Príncipe was established as its own military Comandancia with its capital in Baler.

=== American colonial era ===
Map of the administrative divisions of the Philippines in 1899, with the district of El Príncipe.

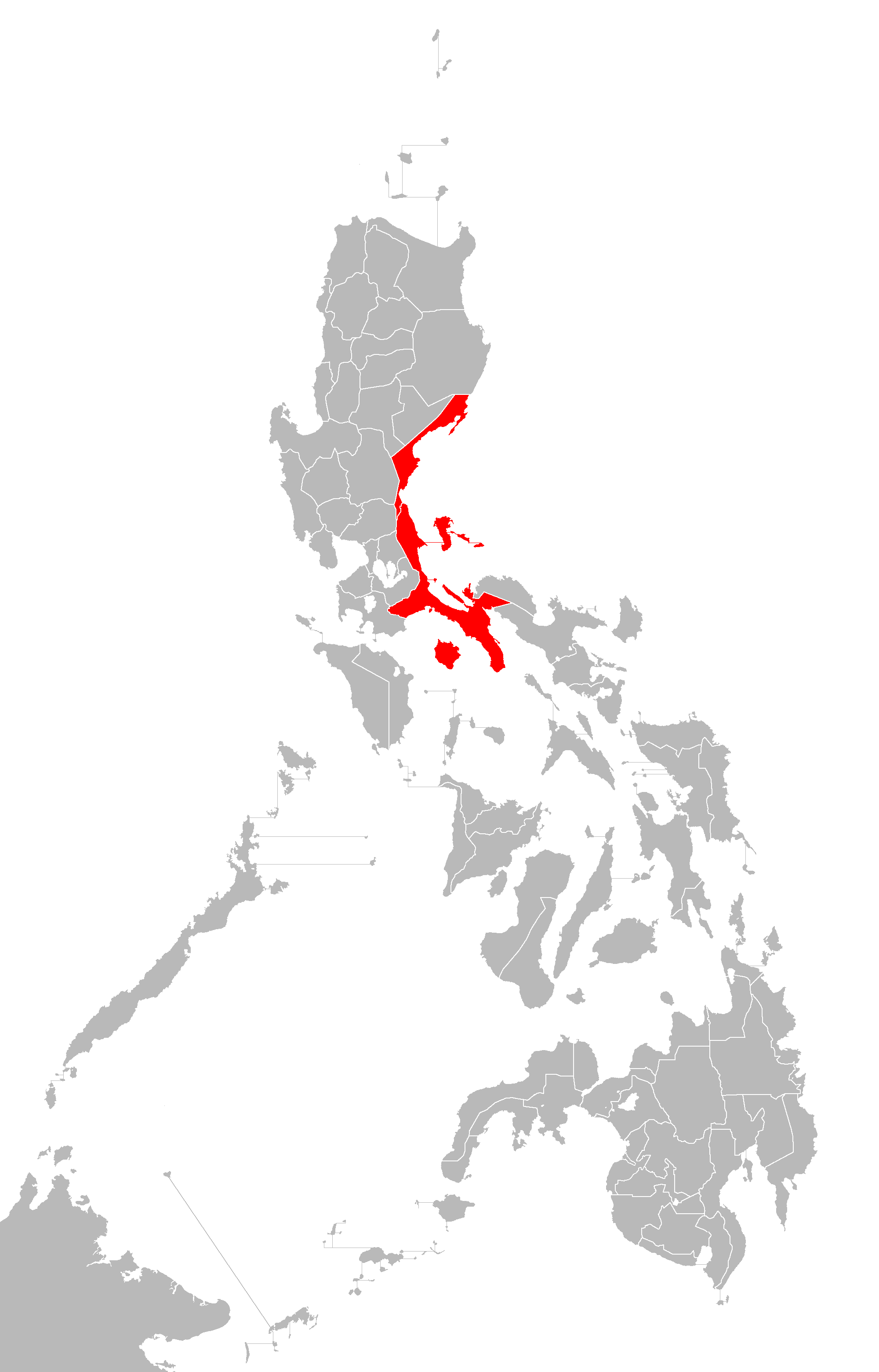
Map of Tayabas from 1902, when El Príncipe was annexed to Tayabas.

Location of northern Tayabas since 1908.

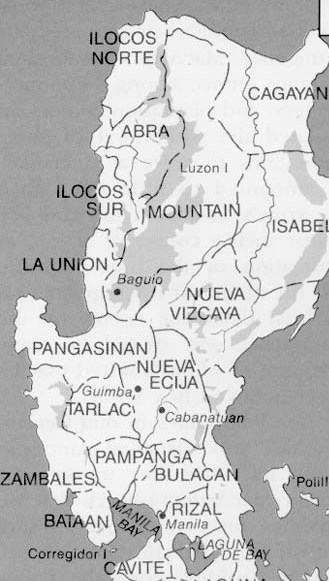
An old map showing the current northern territory of Aurora as part of Nueva Vizcaya.

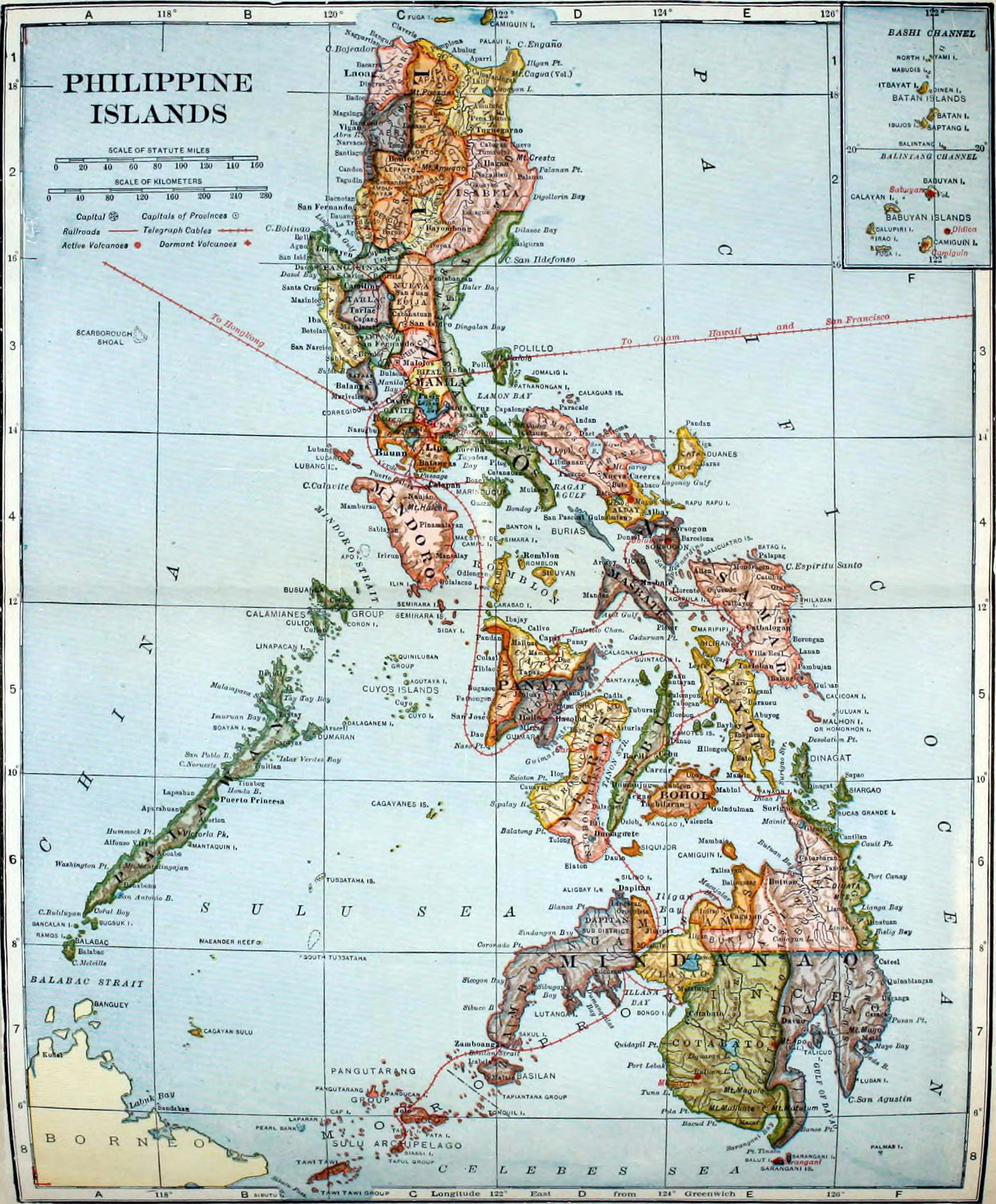
Map of the Philippine Islands showing location of northern Tayabas as the present territory of Aurora in 1921.

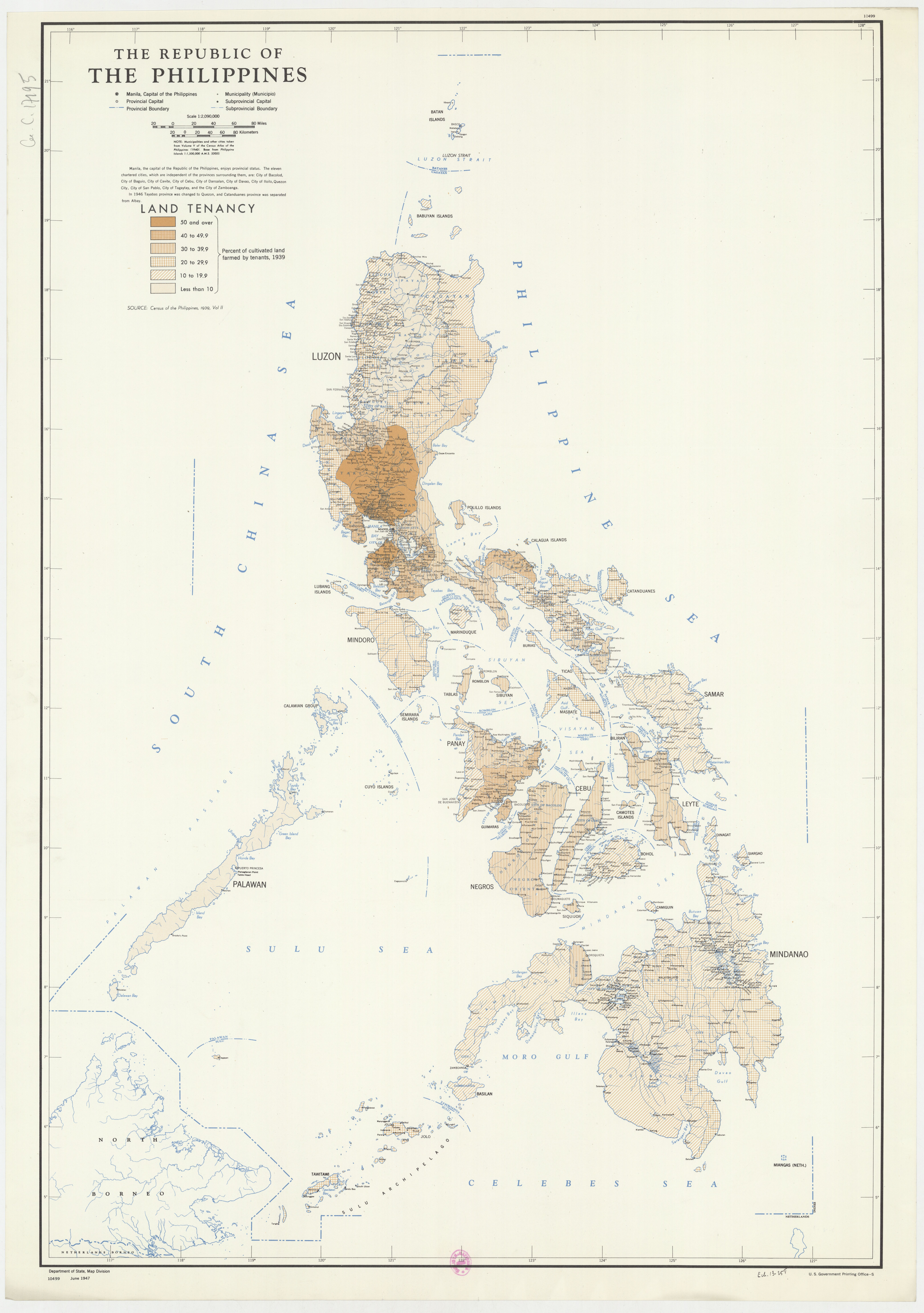
Map showing location of northern Tayabas as the present territory of Aurora during Quezon's time in 1939.

==== District of El Príncipe ====
The early history of Aurora is linked to Quezon province, of which it formed a part, and Nueva Ecija, under which the area was governed as the District of El Príncipe. In 1902, the district was separated from Nueva Écija and transferred to the province of Tayabas (now Quezon). The provincial capital of Tayabas was already transferred from Tayabas to Lucena on March 12, 1901, a year before the transfer of El Príncipe. The northern area which is part of the modern Dilasag and area of modern Casiguran was part of Nueva Vizcaya and also transferred to Tayabas in 1905. In 1918, the area of modern Aurora north of Baler was transferred to the authority of Nueva Vizcaya, but returned to Tayabas in 1921 and in 1942, the entire present-day territory of Aurora was annexed from Tayabas to Nueva Écija, and returned to Tayabas in 1945 until the time when Tayabas was renamed to Quezon in 1946. This was named in honor of Manuel L. Quezon, Baler native who was the second President of the Philippines, had been elected governor of Tayabas in 1906 and assemblyman of the 1st district of Tayabas in 1907.

=== World War II ===
In 1942, invading Japanese forces landed in the town of Casiguran. On February 19, 1945, to May 11, 1945, Allied troops as well as Philippine Commonwealth forces and recognized guerrilla units fought on the Battle of Casiguran during the return of American forces on Luzon on World War II.

=== Postwar era ===
During the postwar years, there were several attempts to make Aurora independent from the rest of Quezon Province. One obvious reason was the area's isolation from the rest of Quezon Province: there were no direct links to the rest of the province and much of the terrain was mountainous and heavily forested, which made the area relatively isolated, and its distance from Quezon's capital Lucena. Independence from Quezon also meant that Aurora would belong in the Central Luzon region, in keeping with its precolonial history, rather than part of Southern Luzon.

Aurora became a sub-province of Quezon on June 14, 1951, through Republic Act No. 648 under the presidency of Elpidio Quirino, after whom its neighboring province was named.

==== 1968 Casiguran earthquake ====
On 04:19:22 local time on August 2, the 1968 Casiguran earthquake, with a moment magnitude of 7.6 and a maximum Mercalli intensity of IX (Violent), took place with an epicenter was in Casiguran. The quake generated a small non-destructive tsunami, but the majority of the 207 people killed during the quake were the result of the collapse of Ruby Tower, a six-storey building in the Santa Cruz district of Manila.

=== Establishment as a province ===
In 1978, the Lieutenant Governor of the Sub-Province Atty. Luis S. Etcubañez filed a Parliamentary Bill for the establishment of Aurora at the Interim Batasang Pambansa, leveraging his political ties with the various Assemblymen of Region IV. This led to a plebiscite in May 1979 to confirm the citizens of the Province's willingness to separate from Quezon Province, and the eventual establishment of the province through Batas Pambansa Blg. 7 on November 21, 1978.

=== Martial law era ===
The beginning months of the 1970s had marked a period of turmoil and change in the Philippines, as well as in Aurora. During his bid to be the first Philippine president to be re-elected for a second term, Ferdinand Marcos launched an unprecedented number of foreign debt-funded public works projects. This caused the Philippine economy to take a sudden downwards turn known as the 1969 Philippine balance of payments crisis, which led to a period of economic difficulty and a significant rise of social unrest.

With only a year left in his last constitutionally allowed term as president, Ferdinand Marcos placed the Philippines under Martial Law in September 1972 and thus retained the position for fourteen more years. This period in Philippine history is remembered for the Marcos administration's record of human rights abuses, particularly targeting political opponents, student activists, journalists, religious workers, farmers, and others who fought against the Marcos dictatorship.

==== Conflict, Militarization, and Hamletting ====
One significant impact on the residents of Aurora, especially its farmers, was the administration's practice of hamletting to achieve military control of the area. After the September 1972 declaration, Marcos forces were ordered into the province to achieve a military presence. But the New People's Army (NPA) which was fighting them responded by establishing a presence of their own in Aurora's mountainous areas. Despite the fact that the residents generally resisted invitations to join the NPA, the dictatorship troops told the residents that they were not allowed into the fields between four in the afternoon and seven in the morning. This made farming very difficult because people had to work in the fields during the hottest parts of the day.

Things took a more violent turn in the town of Dinalungan during the early 1980s, after farmers organized a rally against a landowner who attempted to claim their farms, seeking help and support from the nuns at the Carmelite mission that had been established there. However, the military accused the Carmelites of working with the NPA, and even hunted down the convent's caretaker and one of the church workers. Young men started disappearing from the farms, and rumors begun to spread that they had been victims of extrajudicial killings by Marcos' forces. Much of the male population of Dinalungan began to disappear altogether, with some believed to be victims of the extrajudicial killings, and the rest forced to join the NPA because of the circumstances. The unrest persisted until the town was finally declared "insurgency free" in October 2018.

==== Peasantization of the Agta ====
Anthropologists, particularly those studying the Casiguran Dumagat Agta, refer to the years 1965 to 1980 as a "transition period" from a time when they could still make a living from a traditional hunter-gatherer lifestyle (a "forager phase" in Casiguran Agta history, dated 1964 and earlier) to a time when they effectively became peasants due to the overwhelming environmental degradation of their forests and the migration of lowlanders into their lands (referred to as the "peasant phase" beginning 1980 onwards).

==== Deforestation during the Marcos years ====
As was true of many of the provinces along the Sierra Madre mountain range, the Marcos years coincided with a period or rapid deforestation in Aurora, as the Marcos administration encouraged log exportation to meet soaring wood demand during Japan's period of rapid economic growth.

Commercial logging had actually already been ongoing in Aurora since 1928, but the timber industry massively expanded in the 1960s. By the end of the 1970s, local statistics showed that there were "close to 10,000 persons ...engaged in logging, and more than 40 [logging] firms operating [in Aurora]." Only about 3% of the old-growth forest remained by the 1990s).

==== Birth of the surf tourism industry ====
One of the positive things that did happen to Aurora during the 1970s was the development of the surf tourism industry after the helicopter attack and surfing sequences of the film Apocalypse Now were filmed at Baler in 1976–77. The exposure of locals to the art of surfing during the production of the movie is credited with having sparked the surfing culture in Aurora and the Philippines.

=== Assignment to Central Luzon region ===
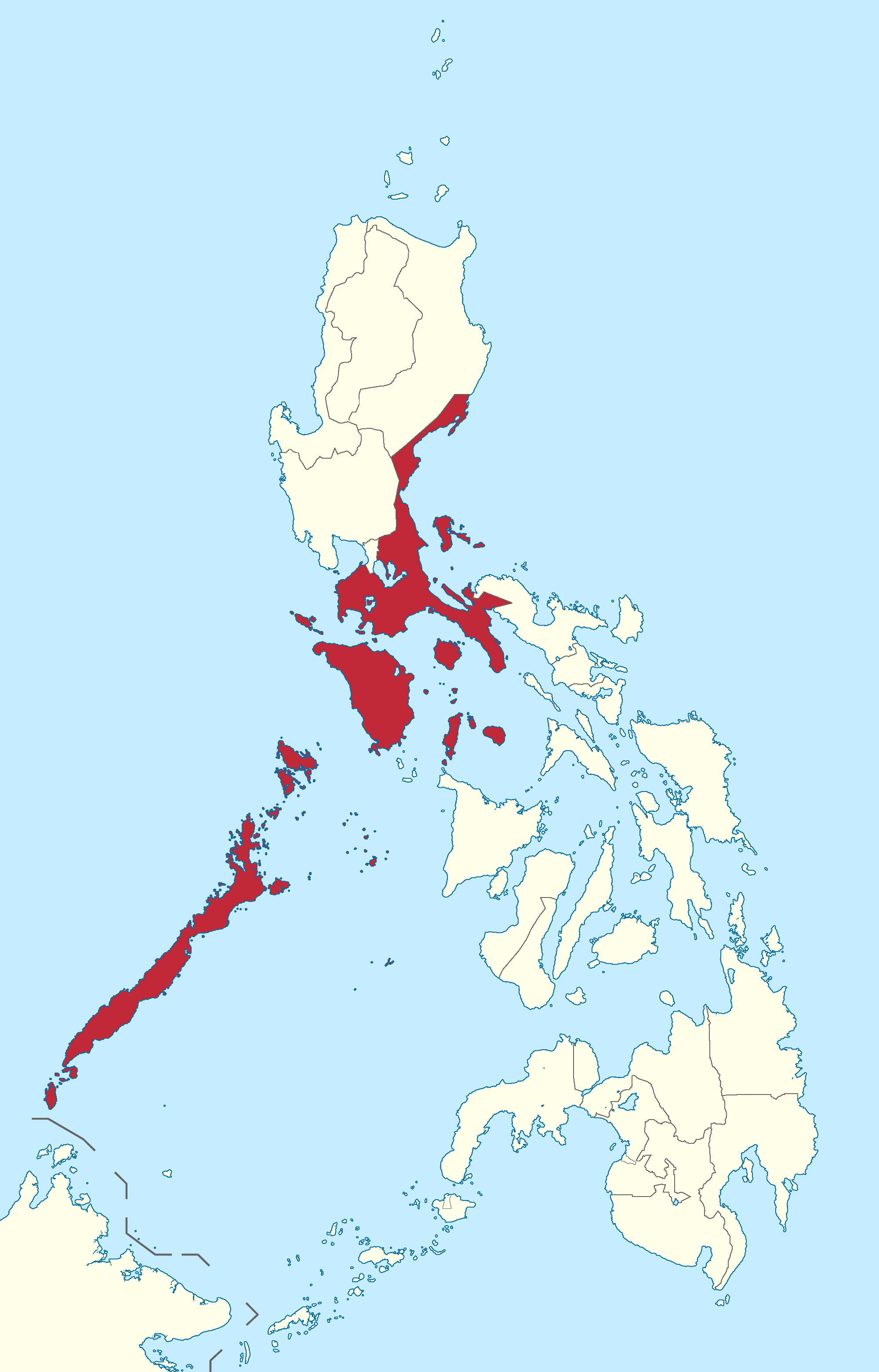
The area of Southern Tagalog where Aurora was the northernmost province.

Being originally part of the province of Quezon, Aurora was part of the Southern Tagalog Region (Region IV). Upon the issuance of Executive Order No. 103, dated May 17, 2002, by then-President Gloria Macapagal-Arroyo, the province of Aurora was moved to Central Luzon (Region III), the geographical location of the province. The provinces south of Aurora were reformed as Calabarzon and Mimaropa, and Southern Tagalog was limited to being a cultural-geographic region. The total separation of Aurora from Quezon, and the transfer of Aurora to Central Luzon were the fulfillment of the wishes and prayers of the residents of the original Municipalities of Baler and Casiguran to be truly independent from Quezon Province for the first time and to reform the original La Pampanga since the Spanish occupation.

The transfer of Aurora to Central Luzon opened the access of Central Luzon to Pacific Ocean. Many residents and government leaders of Aurora objected to the change as Aurora maintains strong historical and cultural connections to the rest of Southern Tagalog, particularly Quezon Province, thus also of the memory of Manuel Quezon, and with that, Aurora residents self-identified with Quezon; but Aurora's transfer to Central Luzon means that geographically, the province is more accessible by land from Nueva Ecija and of course, San Fernando, Pampanga, the regional capital of Central Luzon.

=== Contemporary ===
On April 22, 2024, newly installed Governor Reynante A. Tolentino took his oath of office as governor before his brother, Dipaculao Mayor Danilo A. Tolentino. He replaced Atty. Christian Noveras, who was dismissed by the Office of the Ombudsman along with his father, Vice Governor Gerardo Noveras, in December, 2023.

== Geography ==
Aurora is a coastal province covering an area of 3,147.32 square kilometres (1,215.19 sq mi) in east-central Luzon. To the north, it is bordered by the Northern Sierra Madre Natural Park of Isabela, to the west by the central range of the Sierra Madre which contains the Casecnan Protected Landscape and Aurora Memorial National Park, to the south by the Umiray River, and to the east by the Philippine Sea which opens to the Pacific Ocean. The San Ildefonso Peninsula lies in the province's northern portion between the Philippine Sea and the Casiguran Sound.

=== Topography ===
The province covers a portion of the Sierra Madre mountain range. As such, the elevation is generally steep to very steep and only about 14% of the province's total area is flat.

=== Climate ===
Aurora's climate is classified as Tropical rainforest climate. It experiences significant rainfall throughout the year. Because the coastal province faces the Pacific Ocean, it is frequently visited by typhoons.

=== Administrative divisions ===
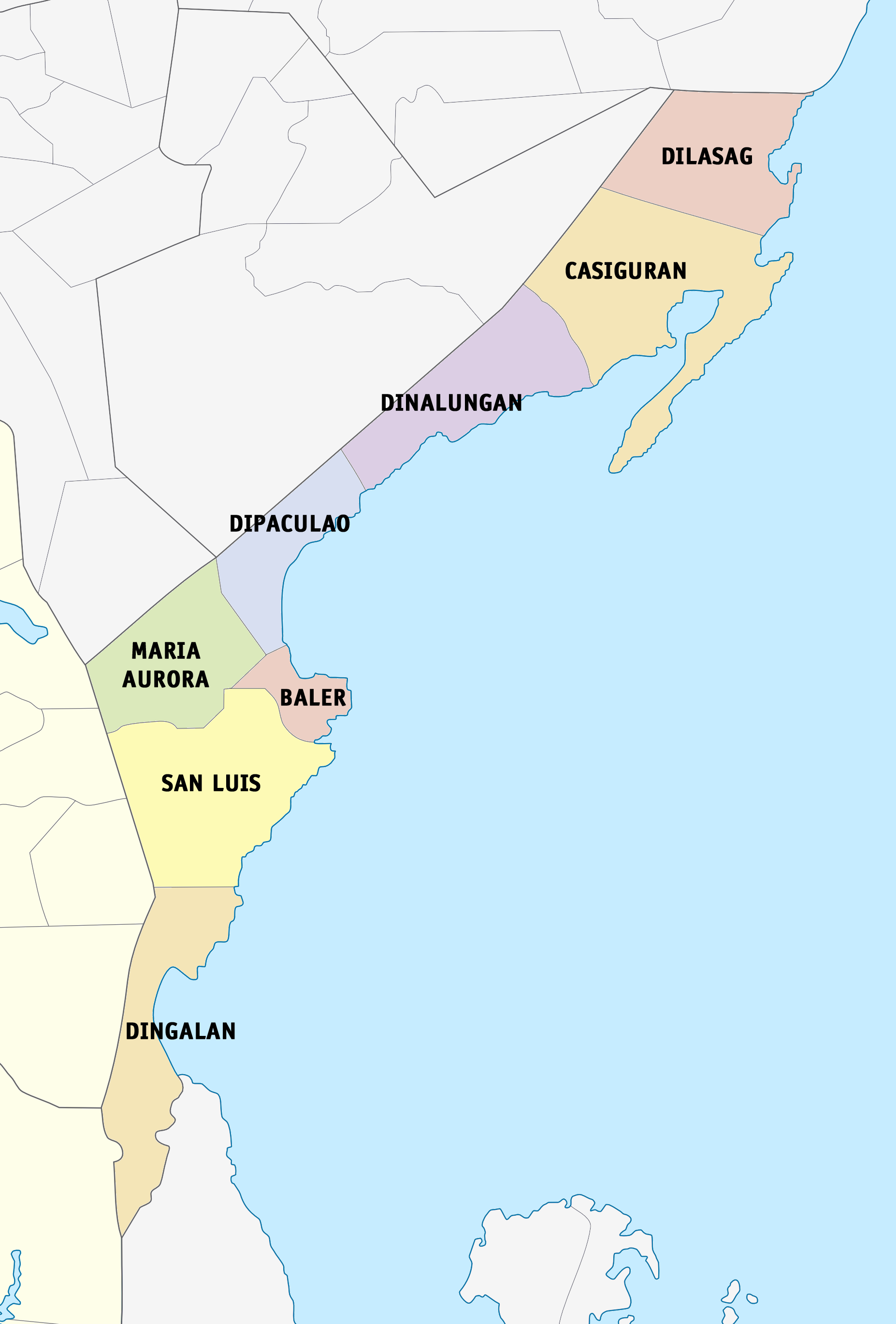
Political map of Aurora

Aurora is politically subdivided into 8 municipalities, all encompassed by a lone legislative district.

Dilasag and Casiguran form the northern part of the province, while Dinalungan, Dipaculao, Maria Aurora, and Baler (the capital) make up the central portion. The southern half of the province consists of San Luis and Dingalan.

Municipality (Note: The globe icon marks the town center.)		Population			±% p.a.	Area		Density		Barangay
		(2020)		(2015)		km^{2}	sq mi	/km^{2}	/sq mi	
Baler	†	18.6%	43,785	39,562	+1.95%	92.54	35.73	470	1,200	13
Casiguran		11.3%	26,564	24,313	+1.70%	715.43	276.23	37	96	24
Dilasag		7.3%	17,102	15,835	+1.48%	306.25	118.24	56	150	11
Dinalungan		5.3%	12,508	11,322	+1.91%	316.85	122.34	39	100	9
Dingalan		11.8%	27,878	25,482	+1.73%	304.55	117.59	92	240	11
Dipaculao		14.1%	33,131	29,736	+2.08%	361.64	139.63	92	240	25
Maria Aurora		19.1%	44,958	40,734	+1.90%	426.29	164.59	110	280	40
San Luis		12.7%	29,824	27,352	+1.66%	609.85	235.46	49	130	18
Total			235,750	214,336	+1.83%	3,133.40	1,209.81	75	190	151
	† Provincial capital					Municipality				

=== Barangays ===
The 8 municipalities of the province comprise a total of 151 barangays, with Suclayin in Baler as the most populous in 2010, and Dibalo in San Luis as the least.

== Demographics ==
Population census of Aurora (province)

Year	Pop.	±% p.a.
1903	4,484	—
1918	5,980	+1.94%
1939	18,280	+5.46%
1948	22,825	+2.50%
1960	42,827	+5.38%
1970	80,459	+6.50%

Year	Pop.	±% p.a.
1975	90,060	+2.29%
1980	107,145	+3.53%
1990	139,573	+2.68%
1995	159,621	+2.55%
2000	173,797	+1.84%
2007	187,802	+1.07%

Year	Pop.	±% p.a.
2010	201,233	+2.55%
2015	214,336	+1.21%
2020	235,750	+2.02%
2024	240,824	+0.51%

Source: Philippine Statistics Authority

The population of Aurora in the 2024 census was 240,824 people, with a density of 77 inhabitants per square kilometre or 200 inhabitants per square mile.

Population by ethnicity (2000)
Ethnicity	Population
Tagalog	91,745 (52.85%)
Ilocano	54,557 (31.43%)
Kasiguranin	8,853 (5.10%)
Bicolano	7,079 (4.08%)
Kankanaey	2,355 (1.36%)
Bisaya	1,529 (0.88%)
Dumagat (Umiray)	1,047 (0.6%)
Cebuano	832 (0.48%)
Others	4,943 (2.85%)
Not Reported	649 (0.37%)

Based on the 2000 census survey, Tagalogs comprised 52.85% (91,745) of the total provincial population of 173,589, and about less than 1/3 of the population were Ilocano at 31.43% (54,557). Other ethnic groups in the province were Kasiguranin at 5.1% (8,853), Bicolano at 4.08% (7,079), Kankanaey at 1.36% (2,355), Bisaya at 0.88% (1,529), Dumagat (Umiray) at 0.6% (1,047), and Cebuano at 0.48% (832).

On the 2010 census survey, Tagalogs numbered 91,219, Ilocanos 67,861, Bicolano 14,250, Kankanaey 4,494, Bisaya 4,786, Umiray Dumagat 1,267, and Cebuano 1,777.

There are also pockets of Bugkalots & Negritos, called Dumagats. Most Dumagats are living in the hillsides or mountains. They are believed to have result from a fusion of Austronesian and Melanesian ancestries, and survive from fishing and hunting. There are three kinds of Dumagats in Aurora province, the Umiray Dumagat, Casiguran Dumagat, and the Palanan Dumagat; minor Dumagat groups are called Southern Alta or Alta Kabulowan, Northern Alta or Edimala, and Tagabulós. Bugkalots are the second tribe indigenous to Aurora, most of them live in Dipaculao & Maria Aurora.

Tagalogs, some originating from Palanan and Infanta, Quezon, came in to the area to trade by boat, some Tagalogs settled in Aurora (especially Baler) and married with the Aeta and Bugkalots. Kapampangans assimilated to the Tagalog settlers. Among the descendants of Aetas and Bugkalots are from the line of survivors of tromba marina; Bihasas are from Aeta origins and Lumasacs are descendants of Bugkalots. The Spanish brought in Filipino acolytes from other areas of Luzon from 1609 to 1899. During this period, Baler can only be access by sea though the town saw increase migration from other parts of Luzon such as Laguna, Tayabas, and Bicol from the south.

The opening of the Baler-Bongabon Road allowed easier migration of people from Ilocos and Isabela areas from the north; during the Spanish time before the opening of the road, Ilocano and Isabela settlers already moved to Baler. The road also allowed Igorot people and Batangueño Tagalogs to settle in Baler & other places of Aurora. The majority of Igorots settled Dipaculao, Maria Aurora, & Baler.

In 1896, a group of Ilocanos from Aringay, La Union came to settle in San Jose, now called Maria Aurora; in 1906, another group of Ilocanos arrived from La Union and Pangasinan. In the early 1920s, Ilocano settlers from Central Luzon settled a Bugkalot territory Dipaculao, which in turn was derived from the phrase Dipac naulaw or Naulaw ni Dipac, the Ilocano for "Dipac got dizzy", idiomatically "Dipac is/got drunk", Dipac is the name of a Bugkalot chief; another group of Ilocano settlers arrived from La Union, Pangasinan, and other areas of Ilocos Region. The guerrilla movement during the Japanese occupation brought Novo Ecijanos (people from Nueva Ecija) to Baler; Novo Ecijanos include Tagalogs, Ilocanos, and Kapampangans, with quite large number of Pangasinenses.

The Balereños learned trade from the Batangueños and the Novo Ecijanos; where before they used to share what they have, now they would sell coconut to their neighbors. Other ethnic groups who came and stayed in Aurora include Christianized Gaddang and Isinai settlers who settled the surrounding lowlands of Baler Bay. These ethnic groups who lived for several centuries & left cultural influences & legacies made Aurora the melting pot of the Central Luzon, next to Tarlac & Nueva Ecija.

=== Languages ===
The Tagalog and Ilocano languages are spoken by their respective ethnic groups. The province primarily speaks a Tagalog dialect that is closely related to Tayabas Tagalog of Quezon with some Ilocano influences. In Baler, for example, the variety is called Tagalog-Baler (Balereño). The Balereño is also known for distinctive expressions like akkaw, used to express surprise, wonder, disgust, and objection; it is also akin to the English term "Wow!" Other regional term expressions spoken in Baler are are(h), used to express a negative feeling of surprise; anin, used to express regret or pity for a situation; and many other words are also spoken similarly to neighboring Quezon, like adyo, meaning to climb, and puropur, which pertain to rain with gusty wind. Ilocano is mostly spoken in northern areas of the province.

The working population is able to converse in English and in Filipino. Manuel L. Quezon, who was from Baler, was called the Father of the National Language for approving the recommendation of the Institute of National Language for Tagalog as the basis of the national language. Other languages spoken in Aurora are Kapampangan, and Pangasinan (in some areas of the province, most of which is in Baler) and Ga'dang & Isinai in surrounding lowlands of Baler Bay, & other languages native in Aurora are Casiguranin or Kasiguranin, spoken in Casiguran & neighboring areas Dilasag & Dinalungan where Casiguran Dumagat and Paranan Dumagat languages are also spoken, Umiray Dumagat spoken in San Luis and Dingalan, Southern Alta or Alta Kabulowan spoken in Dingalan, Northern Alta or Edimala spoken in Baler, Maria Aurora and San Luis, Tagabulós in Dingalan and San Luis, and Bugkalot spoken in Dipaculao, Dinalungan, Maria Aurora, and Baler.

=== Religion ===
==== Catholicism ====
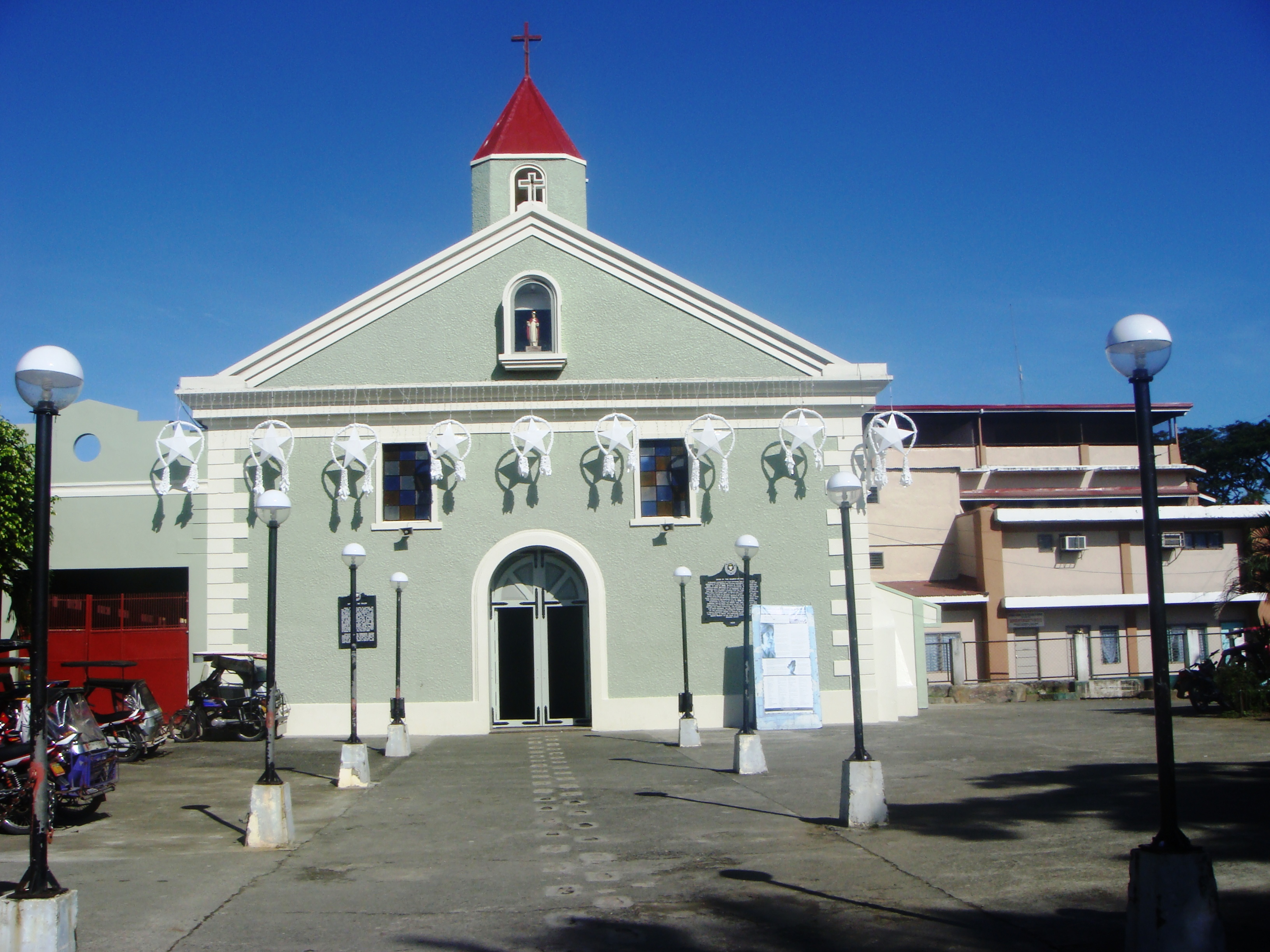
Baler Church

The people of Aurora are heavily Catholics (large majority being Roman Catholic by 87%) as a result of hundreds of years of Spanish colonization.

==== Others ====
Some other Christian believers are also present, which includes Members Church of God International (MCGI), Methodists, Aglipayan Church 2-3%, Baptists, Born Again Christians, Jehovah's Witnesses, Iglesia ni Cristo 4% and Seventh-day Adventist while Muslims are also found which presence is traced to migration by some people from some parts of Mindanao. Muslims, Anitists, animists, and atheists are also present in the province.

== Economy ==
Poverty incidence of Aurora (%)

Source: Philippine Statistics Authority

Corn, rice and other major agricultural crops are grown in Aurora, with a total of 13% of the provincial land area used for agriculture. It also has 8,945 hectares (22,100 acres) of rice plantation that averages 24,000 metric tons (24,000 long tons; 26,000 short tons) every year.

=== Aurora Pacific Economic Zone ===
Casiguran is home to the Aurora Pacific Economic Zone and Freeport Authority or APECO a special economic zone located in this coastal town. Created in 2007 by virtue of Republic Act No. 9490 through the efforts of Sen. Edgardo Angara and his son, Aurora Rep. Sonny Angara, it is expected be a major transshipment hub going to the Pacific region. It aims to boost social, economic and industrial developments in Aurora and nearby provinces by generating jobs for the people, improving the quality of their living conditions, advocating an eco-friendly approach to industrialization and enhancing the potential of the community in productivity.

== Government ==
Current Provincial Government Officials (2025-2028)

- Governor: Isidro P. Galban (LDP)
- Vice-Governor: Patrick Alexis G. Angara (LDP)

Sangguniang Panlalawigan Members

1st District

- Pedro M. Ong Jr. (LDP)
- Philippe Jacobson A. Galban (LDP)
- Norman V. Palmero (LDP)
- Mariano C. Tangson (Nacionalista)
- Sherwin G. Amatorio (PFP)
- Mae Ann K. Tolentino (LDP)

2nd District

- Ryan Austin K. Tolentino (LDP)
- Menard M. Amansec (LDP)
- Jennifer A. Araña (PFP)
- Sheenalyn B. Tablang (Independent)

Ex-Officio Members

- Ruel Joseph G. Angara (President, Liga ng mga Barangay)
- Mara S. Cayetano (President, PCL)
- Lloyd Alsen A. Delos Reyes (President, Panlalawigang Pederasyon ng Sangguniang Kabataan)
- Randy O. Salo (Representative, IPMR)

== House of Representatives ==
District	Representative	Party	Term	Bloc
Lone	Rommel Rico T. Angara	LDP	3	Majority

== Culture ==
Aurora culture is a mixture of Tagalog and Ilocano, with some Kapampangan, Pangasinense, and other indigenous (mostly Aeta, Bugkalot, and Igorot) cultures within the province. A melting pot of culture, the province has a varied of festivals, traditions, and beliefs that constitute Aurora heritage, along with tangible heritage structures, scenes, and objects.

== Gallery ==
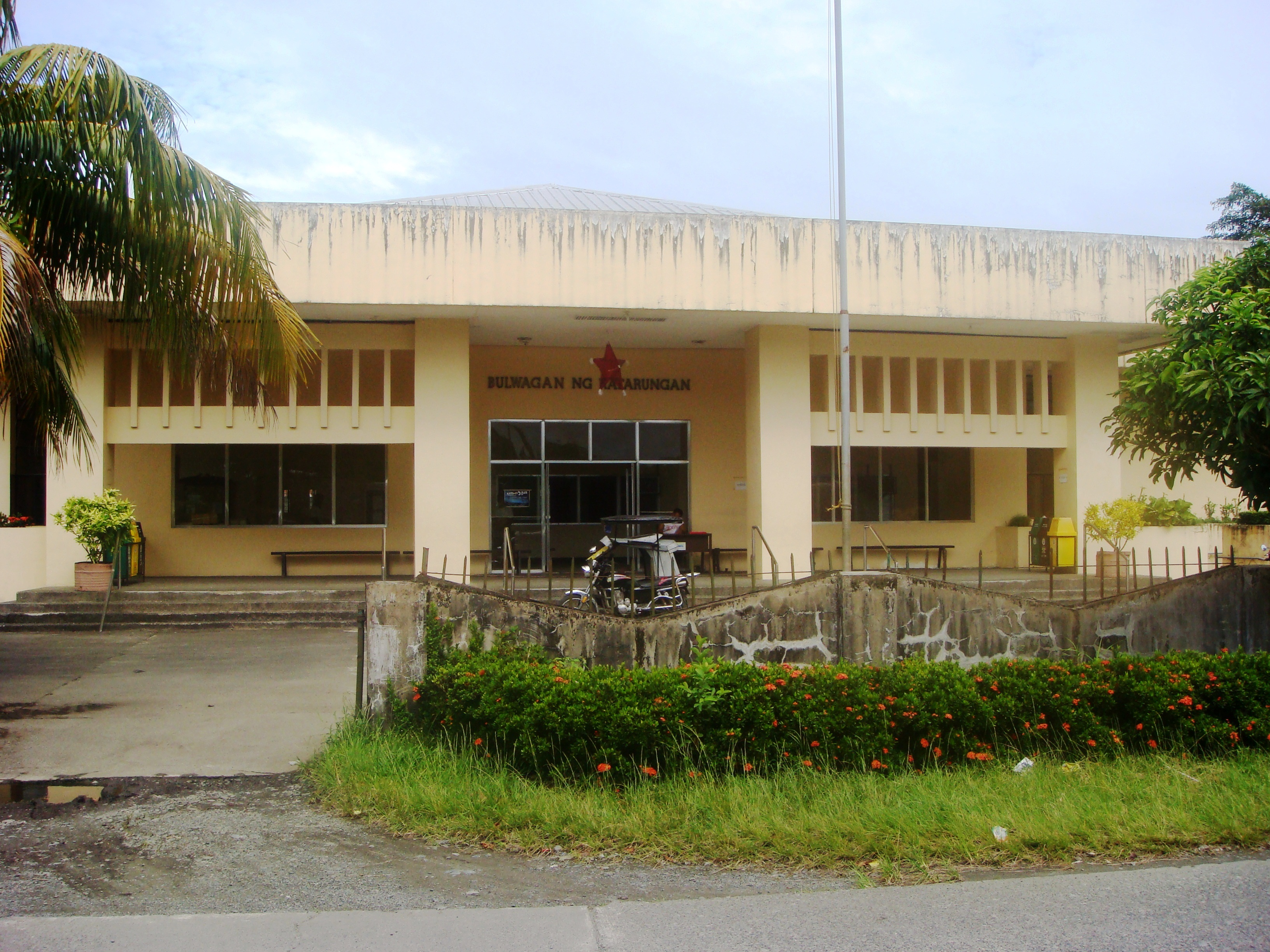
Bulwagan ng Katarungan (RTC), Suklayin, Baler

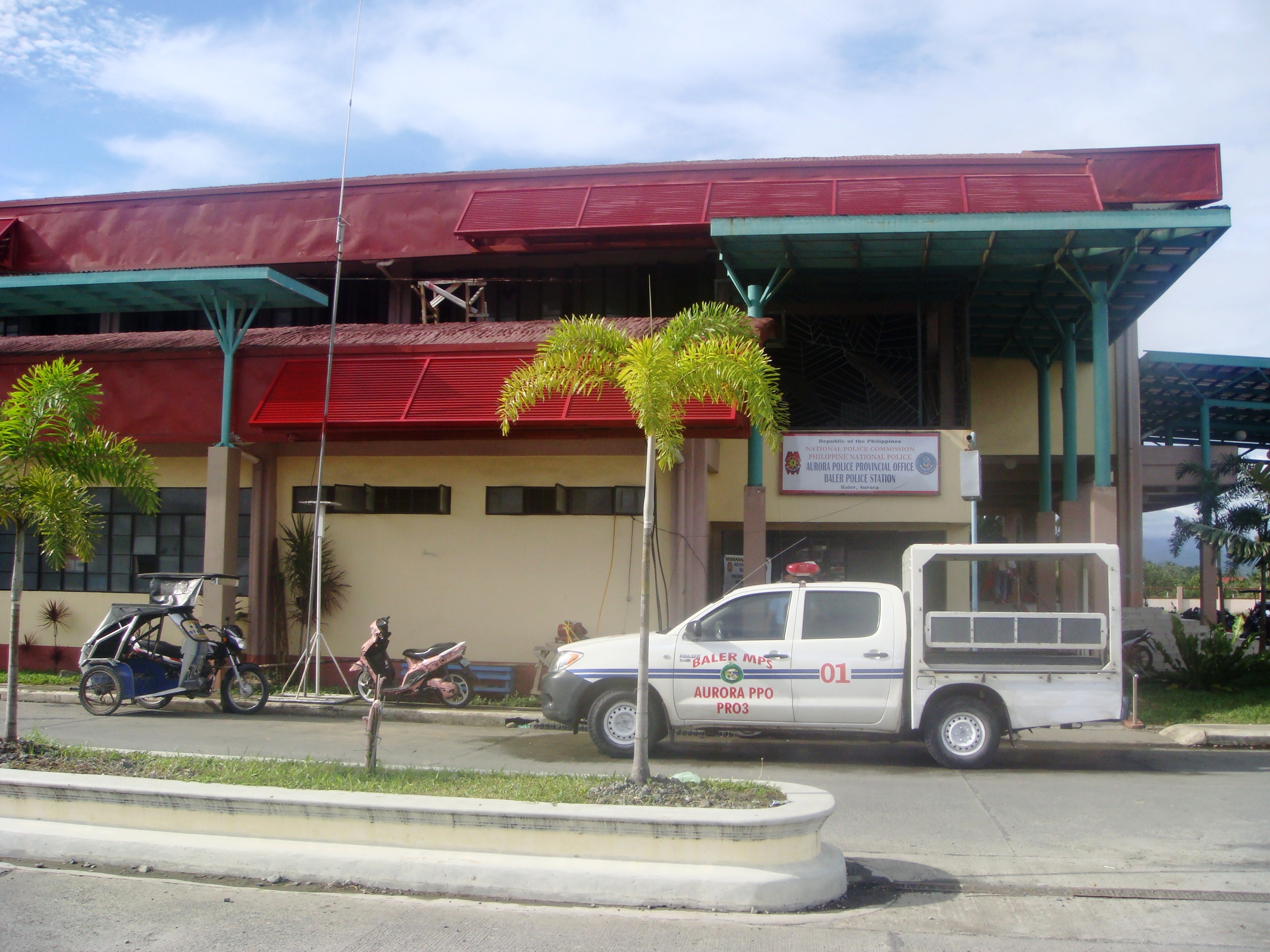
Aurora Police Provincial Office, NPC, PNP, Baler

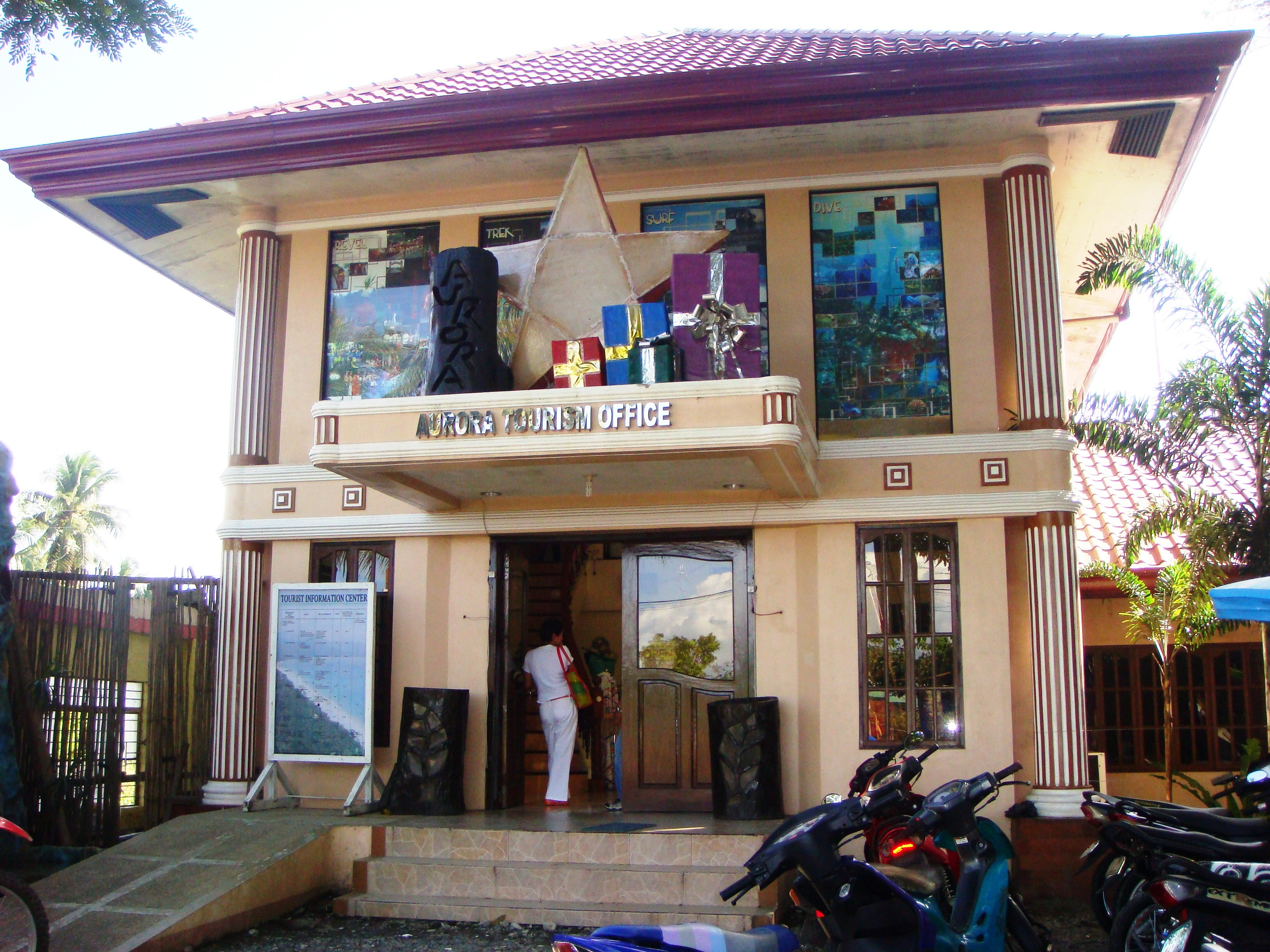
Aurora Provincial Tourism Office (Suklayin)

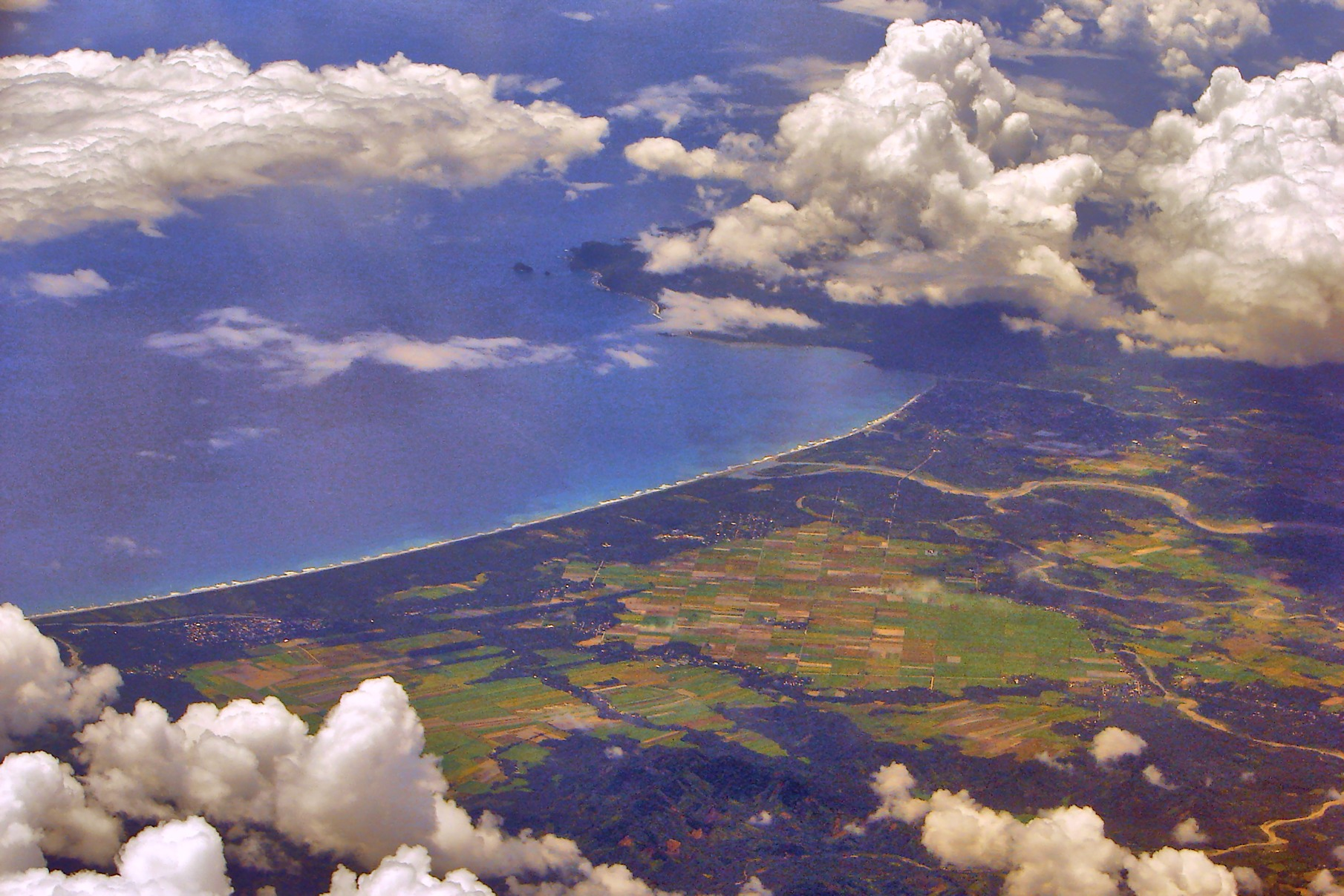
Baler Bay

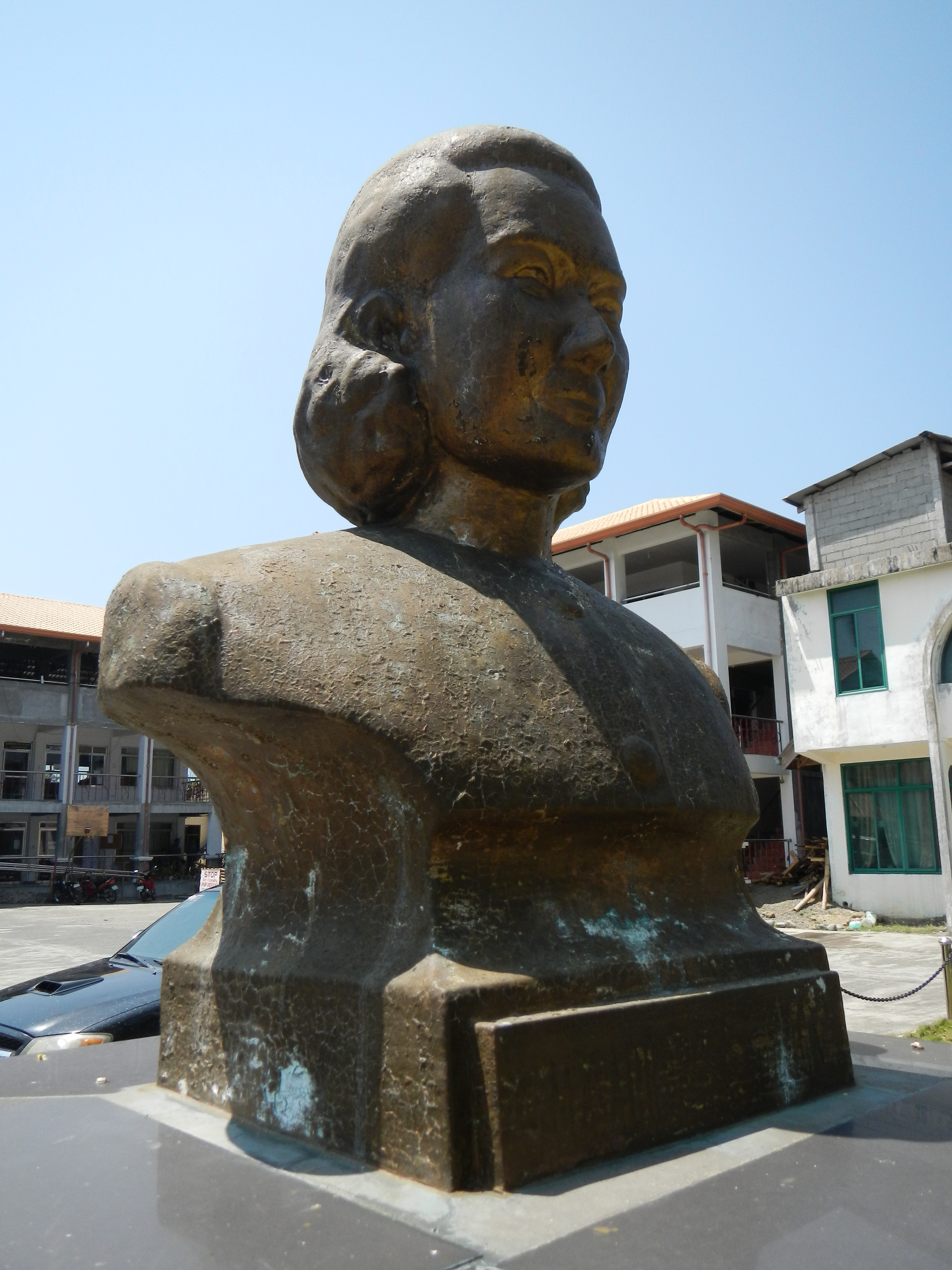
Bust of Maria Aurora

== Notable people ==
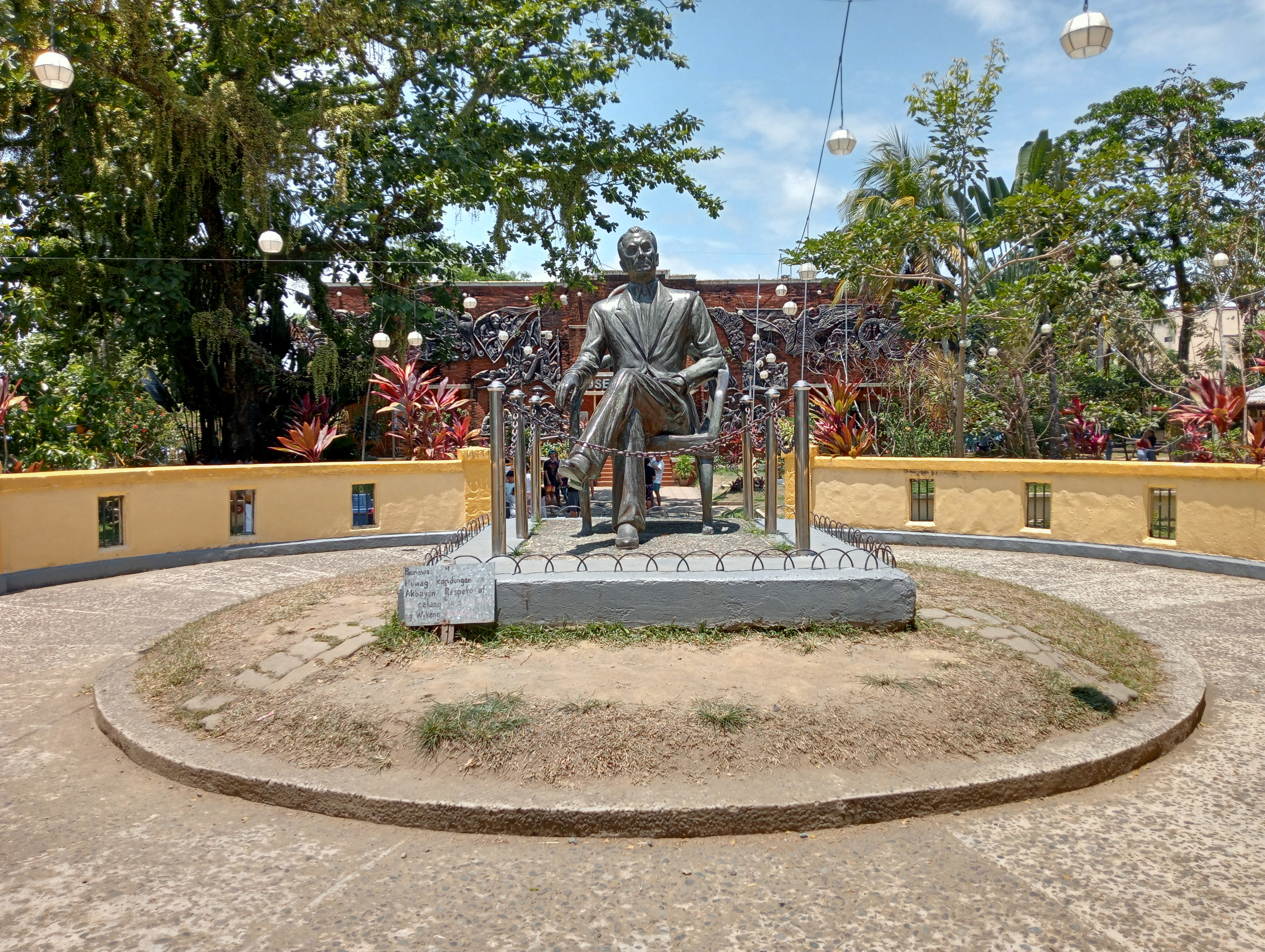
Manuel Luis Quezon Monument in Baler, Aurora

- Sonny Angara, former senator and current secretary of education
- Bellaflor Angara-Castillo, governor from 2004 to 2013
- Edgardo Angara, former senator
- Manuel L. Quezon, first president of the Commonwealth of the Philippines
- Aurora Quezon, former first lady of the Philippines, wife of President Manuel L. Quezon
- Arvin Amatorio, attorney and politician, mayor of Bergenfield, New Jersey
- Reynante Tolentino, governor since 2024

== See also ==
- Aurora Quezon
- Siege of Baler
- Sierra Madre mountain range
