= Governor of Aurora =

Local chief executive

- Punong Lalawigan ng Aurora
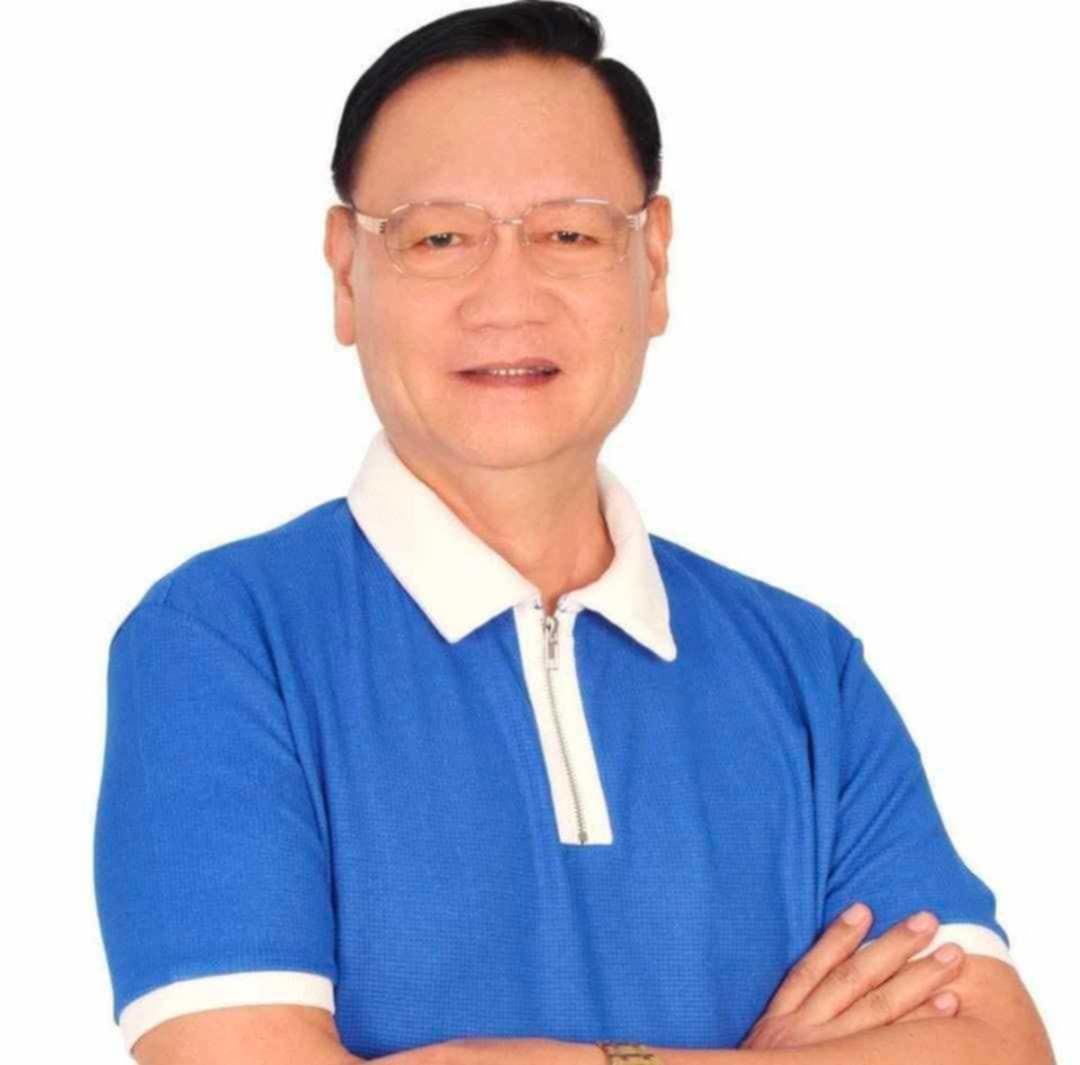
- Incumbent; Isidro P. "Sid" Galban since September 22, 2025
- Style: Mr. Governor, Your Honor, The Honorable
- Residence: Provincial Capitol, Baler
- Term length: 3 years
- Inaugural holder: Luis S. Etcubañez
- Formation: 1979
- Website: www.aurora.gov.ph

The Governor of Aurora (Tagalog: Punong lalawigan ng Aurora) is the local chief executive of the province of Aurora, Philippines since 1979. Before being an independent province, Aurora was a sub-province of Quezon headed by the lieutenant governor from 1951–1978.

== List of governors of Aurora ==
=== Lieutenant governors of Aurora (1951–1978) ===
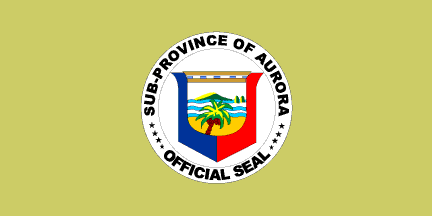
Flag of the sub-province of Aurora featuring its seal.

	Governor	Term
1	Pedro V. Guerrero	1951 (appointed)
2	Juan C. Angara	1952–1955
3	Pedro V. Guerrero	1955–1959
4	Vacant	1959–1964
5	Estello T. Ong	1964–1967
6	Luis S. Etcubañez	1967–1978

=== Governors of Aurora (1979–present) ===
No.	Image	Governor	Term
1		Luis S. Etcubañez	1979–1984
2		Isaias M. Noveras	1984–1986
3		Eunice Guerrero-Cucueco	1988–1991
4		Edgardo L. Ong	1991–2001
5		Ramoncita P. Ong	2001–2004
6		Bella Angara-Castillo	2004–2013
7		Gerardo A. Noveras	2013–2022
8		Christian M. Noveras	2022–2024
9		Reynante Tolentino	2024–2025
10		Isidro P. Galban	2025–present
