= Laban ng Demokratikong Pilipino =

Political party in the Philippines founded in 1988

- Chairman: Sonny Angara
- Founder: Ramon Mitra Jr. Peping Cojuangco
- Founded: September 16, 1988
- Merger of: Lakas ng Bansa; PDP–Laban (Cojuangco wing); PDP–Lakas Coalition; Minor KBL factions
- Split from: PDP–Laban
- Headquarters: Unit 201, Pasay Road Condominium, 926 Arnaiz Avenue, Brgy. San Lorenzo, Makati, Philippines
- Political position: Centre-right
- National affiliation: HNP (2019); Team PNoy (2013); TEAM Unity (2007); KNP (2004); Puwersa ng Masa (2001); LAMMP (1997); Lakas–Laban (1995)
- International affiliation: Centrist Democrat International
- Colors: Blue and Yellow
- Senate: 0 / 24
- House of Representatives: 1 / 318
- Provincial governors: 1 / 82
- Provincial vice governors: 1 / 82
- Provincial board members: 6 / 840

Laban ng Demokratikong Pilipino (LDP; lit. 'Fight of Democratic Filipinos') is a political party in the Philippines founded by Ramon Mitra Jr. and Peping Cojuangco. LDP was more commonly referred to as Laban during its early years.

== History ==
=== Early years ===
LDP logo in 1988

In 1987, Tarlac 1st district Representative Peping Cojuangco, the brother of President Corazon Aquino and a stalwart of PDP–Laban, started recruiting national and local politicians allied with deposed president Ferdinand Marcos and his Kilusang Bagong Lipunan into the party. As a result, PDP–Laban was split into two factions: the Pimentel wing led by Senator Nene Pimentel, the original PDP founder, and the Cojuangco wing. The latter faction merged with Lakas ng Bansa led by House Speaker Ramon Mitra Jr. with presidential brother-in-law Paul Aquino to form Laban ng Demokratikong Pilipino on September 16, 1988. President Aquino addressed the inaugural LDP convention at the Philippine International Convention Center in Pasay. LDP's party structure and membership were modeled from KBL, but its primary mission was to support the Aquino administration.

=== Ramos administration ===
The first LDP National Convention was held on November 30, 1991 for the 1992 presidential election. Mitra won the presidential nomination, defeating Marcos' cousin and former National Defense Secretary Fidel V. Ramos. Despite winning the national delegate vote, Mitra garnered only eight votes in Cojuangco's home province of Tarlac, compared to 53 votes for Ramos. Ramos also won in his home province of Pangasinan, earning 76 votes to Mitra's 41, and in provinces within Western Mindanao. Ramos and Mitra tied in the Ilocos Region and ARMM.

1991 LDP National Convention
Candidate		
Name	Ramon Mitra Jr.	Fidel V. Ramos
Votes	2,062	1,613
Regions won	(7) NCR, I, IV, V, VI, XI, XII	(4) III, XIII, IX, X

After losing the nomination to Mitra, Ramos bolted the LDP and formed Lakas–NUCD in January 1992 as vehicle for his presidential bid. Ultimately, Ramos narrowly won the election, while Mitra placed fourth. Ramos was backed by President Corazon Aquino, while Mitra had the support of Manila Archbishop Jaime Cardinal Sin. Despite losing the presidency, the LDP scored victories in both houses of Congress, winning 16 seats in the Senate (with actors and LDP stalwarts Tito Sotto and Ramon Revilla Sr. as topnotchers), and 86 seats in the House of Representatives. Afterwards, House LDP members formed a coalition bloc called Rainbow Coalition with former partymate and Lakas co-founder Jose de Venecia Jr., resulting in de Venecia's election as House Speaker, succeeding Mitra.

In 1994, the LDP formed a major coalition with Lakas–NUCD, called the Lakas–Laban Coalition, for the 1995 general election. Despite winning a majority of seats in both houses of Congress, the coalition split days after the election when some LDP candidates such as Senator Rodolfo Biazon accused fellow LDP senatorial nominees Mitra and Juan Ponce Enrile of electoral fraud.

For the 1998 presidential election, senators Raul Roco and Gloria Macapagal Arroyo—LDP stalwarts and topnotchers in the 1995 Senate election—bolted the LDP in the fourth quarter of 1997 to establish new political organizations for their presidential ambitions; Roco formed Aksyon Demokratiko, while Arroyo organized Kabalikat ng Mamamayang Pilipino. Party founder Peping Cojuangco left the LDP due to internal disagreements, joining Arroyo in the formation of KAMPI and supporting her candidacy. Arroyo, however, was convinced by Cardinal Sin to discontinue her presidential bid and instead run for vice president as de Venecia's running mate under Lakas–NUCD–UMDP.

=== Estrada administration ===
With Mitra's departure from politics following his 1995 senatorial defeat, the LDP started to be taken over by his close ally, Senator Edgardo Angara, who himself wanted to pursue a presidential run. However, Angara eventually decided to back Vice President Joseph Estrada, who was a consistent frontrunner for the presidential race. The LDP formed a coalition with PDP–Laban, Estrada's Partido ng Masang Pilipino, and the Nationalist People's Coalition, led by businessman Danding Cojuangco, to form Laban ng Makabayang Masang Pilipino. LAMMP served as Estrada's vehicle for his presidential bid, with Angara as his running mate. Estrada won by a landslide margin over de Venecia, but Angara was decisively defeated by Arroyo. For the senatorial race, four LAMMP candidates won seats, while in the House elections, no LDP candidate stood independently from LAMMP. After his defeat, Angara was appointed Secretary of Agriculture by President Estrada in 1999.

During Estrada's impeachment trial in January 2001, LDP-allied senators were divided in the voting for examining pieces of evidence against President Estrada. Senator Biazon voted in favor of opening the historic second envelope which was supposed to contain incriminating evidence against Estrada, aligning with the opposition senator-judges. On the other hand, senators Blas Ople, Tessie Aquino-Oreta and Tito Sotto voted against the motion, which was defeated by a vote of 10–11. The failure to disclose the envelope prompted the Second EDSA Revolution in January 2001.

=== Arroyo administration ===
After Estrada's ouster, the LDP formed a coalition with the PMP, Senator Miriam Defensor Santiago's People's Reform Party and other pro-Estrada groups and figures to form Puwersa ng Masa, the opposition bloc for the 2001 Senate election. Puwersa welcomed neophyte LDP members into its senatorial slate, among them former Philippine National Police Chief Panfilo Lacson. Puwersa managed to win five out of 13 contested Senate seats, including LDP's Angara and Lacson.

In 2002, Biazon stated that he would not join the administration of President Arroyo, although she offered him some positions such as Secretary of Public Works and Highways and a secretaryship for a potential Department of Housing. Ople, who was earlier identified with the pro-Estrada bloc, accepted Arroyo's offer to serve as Secretary of Foreign Affairs.

In 2003, the LDP prepared a list of potential senatorial candidates for the 2004 Senate election. The slate included Biazon and Oreta, as well as former senators Enrile, Santiago and Francisco Tatad. Also projected to be included were congressmen Carlos Padilla and Ted Failon who were expected to become the House voice of the slate, while Camarines Sur Governor Luis Villafuerte would be the local voice. Former Senate president Pimentel, who notably voted in favor of opening the second envelope in the aborted trial, was also seen as a valuable member should he join the LDP slate. North Cotabato Governor Emmanuel Piñol, who was from Lakas, and Ilocos Norte Representative Imee Marcos of KBL were also projected to be recruited by the LDP. The LDP also met with the NPC to form a coalition for that election cycle.

==== 2004 elections: Angara wing vs Aquino wing ====
LDP logo when Ping Lacson was campaigning in 2004

In the 2004 presidential election, the LDP was critically divided into two factions: the majority wing led by Angara, and the Aquino wing led by Makati Representative Butz Aquino. The internal rift started when the Angara wing partnered with PDP–Laban and PMP to form the Koalisyon ng Nagkakaisang Pilipino to support the presidential bid of actor Fernando Poe Jr., a close friend of Estrada. Lacson criticized the move and gathered the support of the party's Aquino wing for his presidential campaign. Lacson's campaign was not recognized by party president Angara, insisting on campaigning for Poe.

Due to the intense factionalism affecting the party, Biazon left the LDP along with his son Ruffy and Congressman Abraham Mitra, son of party founder Mitra. They later joined the Liberal Party, which was a member party of the administration ticket called the Koalisyon ng Katapatan at Karanasan sa Kinabukasan. Biazon initially joined Aksyon, which had Senator Roco as its presidential nominee, before becoming a Liberal.

Hence, the LDP was subsequently polarized between the Angara–Poe and Lacson–Aquino factions. By then, Poe and Lacson both filed their certificates of candidacy for president. With no sign that the two feuding factions would come to an agreement, the Commission on Elections decided to informally split the LDP into the Aquino and Angara wings. Lacson ran under the Aquino wing, while Poe launched his bid under the Angara wing which formed the main core of the KNP. Aquino blasted Angara for his passion for control that had spawned internal divisions within the party. Angara's actions caused LDP stalwarts such as former Senate president Neptali Gonzales, Executive Secretary Alberto Romulo and former senator Heherson Alvarez, among others, to leave the LDP.

There are no results available for the 2004 House of Representatives elections, but according to the House website, the LDP won 7 out of 235 seats. In that year's Senate election, only one LDP member who ran under the KNP—former Social Welfare and Development undersecretary Jamby Madrigal—won a Senate seat, while Padilla, the lone senatorial candidate under Lacson's camp, lost.

For the 2007 national elections, the LDP reunited with Lakas–CMD, its 1995 electoral partner, to form TEAM Unity, the administration coalition led by President Arroyo. Sotto and Aquino-Oreta left the LDP to join the NPC, originally preferring to side with the opposition. However, they automatically became part of the pro-Arroyo ticket, as the NPC joined TEAM Unity. Due to the unpopularity of the Arroyo administration, party leader Angara was one of the only two TEAM Unity candidates who won Senate seats. For the House elections, the LDP won only three seats.

=== Second Aquino administration ===
In 2010, due to the new automated election law, the LDP applied for official re-acknowledgment before the COMELEC. For the presidential and vice presidential elections, the LDP supported the Nacionalista–NPC ticket of Senate colleagues Manny Villar and Loren Legarda. Villar lost to Liberal Party standard-bearer Senator Benigno Aquino III, while Legarda placed third in the vice presidential race won by Makati Mayor Jejomar Binay of PDP–Laban.

The LDP partnered with the ruling LP, NP, NPC and Akbayan for Team PNoy, the administration coalition for the 2013 general election. The party fielded Angara's son Sonny, who won a Senate seat, placing sixth.

=== Duterte administration ===
In early 2016, party president Angara initially expressed the LDP's intention to support the presidential campaign of independent Senator Grace Poe for 2016. However, the LDP ultimately supported the presidential bid of Davao City Mayor Rodrigo Duterte, the standard-bearer of PDP–Laban.

On September 24, 2018, Senator Sonny Angara was elected LDP party president at an organizational meeting and fellowship dinner held at the Manila Golf and Country Club, succeeding his father. That same year, the LDP joined the Hugpong ng Pagbabago of presidential daughter and Davao City mayor Sara Duterte. Angara was tapped as part of HNP's senatorial slate for the 2019 Senate election. Angara won a second term, placing sixth with over 18 million votes.

In 2021, Sonny Angara eyed a national alliance with HNP, as Sara Duterte was poised to run for president due to her strong performance in pre-election surveys. Angara expressed his intention to be Duterte's running mate for the 2022 presidential election. Duterte eventually filed for vice president under Lakas–CMD, running alongside presidential candidate and former senator Bongbong Marcos under the UniTeam ticket.

=== Second Marcos administration ===
With Sonny Angara's appointment as Secretary of Education by President Marcos in 2024, the LDP did not have a single Senate seat for the first time. However, in the Angara clan's home province of Aurora, LDP candidates for governor and vice governor snapped victory, winning seats at the provincial board including one for Angara's brother Patrick.

== Party officials ==
- Chairman: Sonny Angara

== Current members ==
- Rommel Angara
- Isidro Galban, governor of Aurora
- Mariano Martinez, mayor of San Remigio, Cebu
- Alfie Corominas, vice mayor of San Remigio, Cebu

== Notable members ==
=== Presidents ===
- Fidel V. Ramos – 12th president of the Philippines, failed to gather nomination and won under Lakas
- Gloria Macapagal Arroyo – 14th president of the Philippines, bolted LDP to form KAMPI but later joined Lakas

=== Vice President ===
- Gloria Macapagal Arroyo – 10th Vice President
- Teofisto Guingona Jr. – 11th Vice president as Lakas member

=== Senate ===
==== Senate Presidents ====
- Neptali Gonzales – former Senate President
- Edgardo Angara – former Senate President and 1998 vice presidential nominee
- Marcelo Fernan – former Senate President, Chief Justice and 1992 vice presidential nominee

==== Former senators ====
- Jamby Madrigal
- Blas Ople
- Tito Sotto
- Ramon Revilla Sr.
- Raul Roco
- Tessie Aquino-Oreta
- Rodolfo Biazon
- Heherson Alvarez
- Leticia Ramos-Shahani
- Butz Aquino
- Francisco Tatad
- Joey Lina
- Orly Mercado
- Freddie Webb – former congressman
- Panfilo Lacson
- Alberto Romulo
- Ernesto Herrera

=== House of Representatives ===
==== House speakers ====
- Ramon Mitra Jr. – former House Speaker, co-founder and 1992 presidential nominee
- Jose de Venecia – former House Speaker, bolted LDP with Ramos to be co-founder of Lakas

==== Representatives/Congressmen ====
- Peping Cojuangco – former congressman and co-founder
- Oscar Orbos
- Maria Clara Lobregat
- Celso Lobregat
- Jose Calingasan – former ambassador

== Electoral performance ==
=== Presidential and vice presidential elections ===
Year	Presidential election			Vice presidential election		
Year	Candidate	Vote share	Result	Candidate	Vote share	Result
1992	Ramon Mitra Jr.	14.64%	Fidel Ramos (Lakas–NUCD)	Marcelo Fernan	21.74%	Joseph Estrada (NPC)
1998	None (Note: Angara's running mate was Joseph Estrada of the PMP.)		Joseph Estrada (PMP)	Edgardo Angara	22.11%	Gloria Macapagal Arroyo (Lakas–NUCD)
2004	Panfilo Lacson (Note: Aquino wing only. Angara faction supported Fernando Poe Jr.)	10.88%	Gloria Macapagal Arroyo (Lakas–CMD)	None (Note: Lacson did not have a running mate.)		Noli de Castro (Independent)
2010	None (Note: LDP supported Manny Villar (Nacionalista))		Benigno Aquino III (Liberal)	None (Note: LDP supported Loren Legarda (NPC))		Jejomar Binay (PDP–Laban)
2016	None (Note: Supported Rodrigo Duterte who won.)		Rodrigo Duterte (PDP–Laban)	None		Leni Robredo (Liberal)
2022	None		Bongbong Marcos (PFP)	None		Sara Z. Duterte (Lakas–CMD)

=== Legislative elections ===
House election	House Seats won	Result	House election	Senate Seats won	Ticket	Result
1992	86 / 200	LDP plurality	1992	16 / 24	Single party ticket	LDP win 16/24 seats
1995 (Note: Contested in an electoral alliance with the Lakas. Seat total consists of 17 Laban/LDP representatives and 25 dual representatives of Lakas and Laban/LDP.)	42 / 204	Lakas–Laban majority	1995	4 / 12	Lakas–Laban	Lakas–Laban win 9/12 seats
1998 (Note: Contested in an electoral alliance with NPC and PMP as LAMMP. Seat total consists of 55 LAMMP representatives. LDP did not stand any candidates outside the LAMMP alliance.)	55 / 258	Lakas plurality	1998	4 / 12	LAMMP	LAMMP win 7/12 seats
2001	21 / 256	Lakas plurality	2001	2 / 13	Puwersa ng Masa	People Power win 8/13 seats
2004	15 / 261	Lakas plurality	2004	1 / 12	Split ticket	K4 win 7/12 seats
2007	5 / 270	Lakas plurality	2007	1 / 12	TEAM Unity	GO win 8/12 seats
2010	2 / 286	Lakas plurality		Did not participate		Liberal win 4/12 seats
2013	2 / 292	Liberal plurality	2013	1 / 12	Team PNoy	Team PNoy win 9/12 seats
2016	2 / 297	Liberal plurality		Did not participate		Daang Matuwid win 7/12 seats
2019	2 / 304	PDP–Laban plurality	2019	1 / 12	HNP	HNP win 9/12 seats
2022	1 / 316	PDP–Laban plurality		Did not participate		UniTeam win 6/12 seats
2025	2 / 317	Lakas plurality		Did not participate		Bagong Pilipinas win 6/12 seats

== See also ==
Predecessor parties:

- Lakas ng Bansa, one of its predecessor party founded by Ramon Mitra
- Partido Demokratiko Pilipino, one of its predecessor, then known as PDP–Laban

Breakaway parties:

- Lakas–NUCD, a breakaway party founded by Fidel Ramos in 1991
- Kabalikat ng Malayang Pilipino, a breakaway party founded by Gloria Macapagal Arroyo in 1997
- Aksyon Demokratiko, a breakaway party founded by Raul Roco in 1997

Former coalition partners in 1998:

- Pwersa ng Masang Pilipino
- Nationalist People's Coalition
