= San Ildefonso Peninsula =

Peninsula located in Aurora

Coordinates: 16.1583°N 122.0969°E

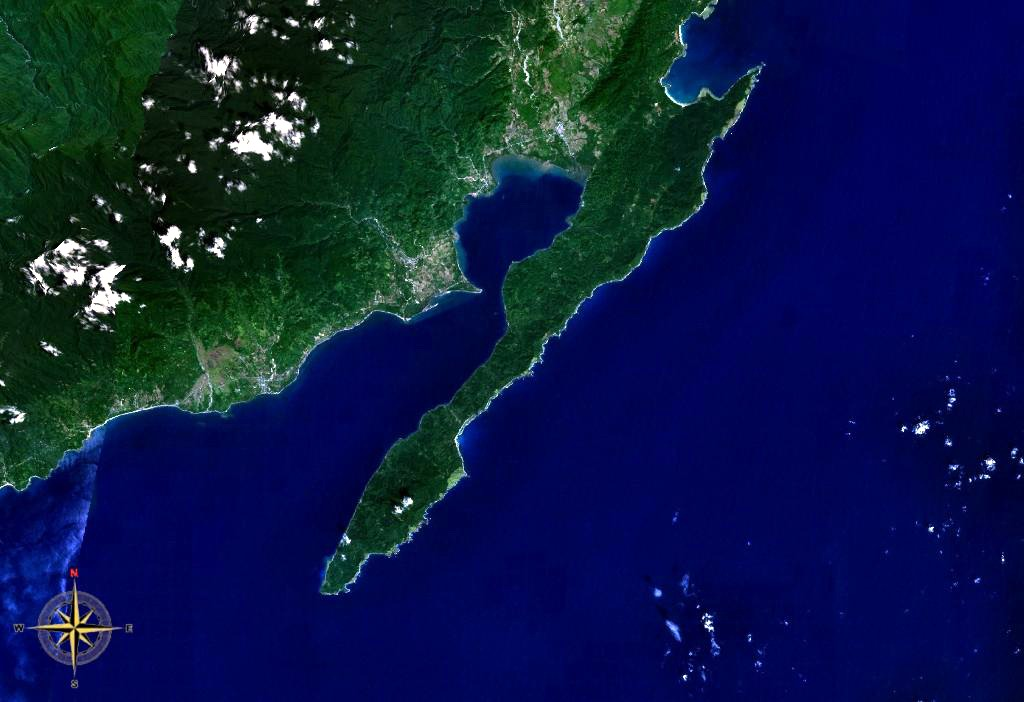
San Ildefonso Peninsula seen from space

San Ildefonso Peninsula is a peninsula in Central Luzon, central part of Luzon island, Philippines. It is attached to the mainland through a 3.5 mile wide strip of land. Cape San Ildefonso can be found south of the peninsula.

The peninsula is entirely under the jurisdiction of the municipality of Casiguran, Aurora. The southern half of the peninsula is under Barangay San Ildefonso, the northern tip is under Barangay Culat, while the remainder belongs to Barangay Cozo. The peninsula is border by water on 2 sides, to the west is the Casiguran Sound, and to the east is the Philippine Sea.
