= Aurora Provincial Board =

Legislative body of the province of Aurora, Philippines

Aurora Provincial Board Sangguniang Panlalawigan ng Aurora

Type
- Type: Unicameral
- Term limits: 3 terms (9 years)

Leadership
- Presiding Officer: Patrick Alexis G. Angara, LDP since September 24, 2025

Structure
- Seats: 14 board members 1 ex officio presiding officer
- Political groups: LDP (7) PFP (2) Nacionalista (1) Nonpartisan (2)
- Length of term: 3 years
- Authority: Local Government Code of the Philippines

Elections
- Voting system: Plurality-at-large (regular members); Indirect election (ex officio members)
- Last election: May 12, 2025
- Next election: May 15, 2028

Meeting place
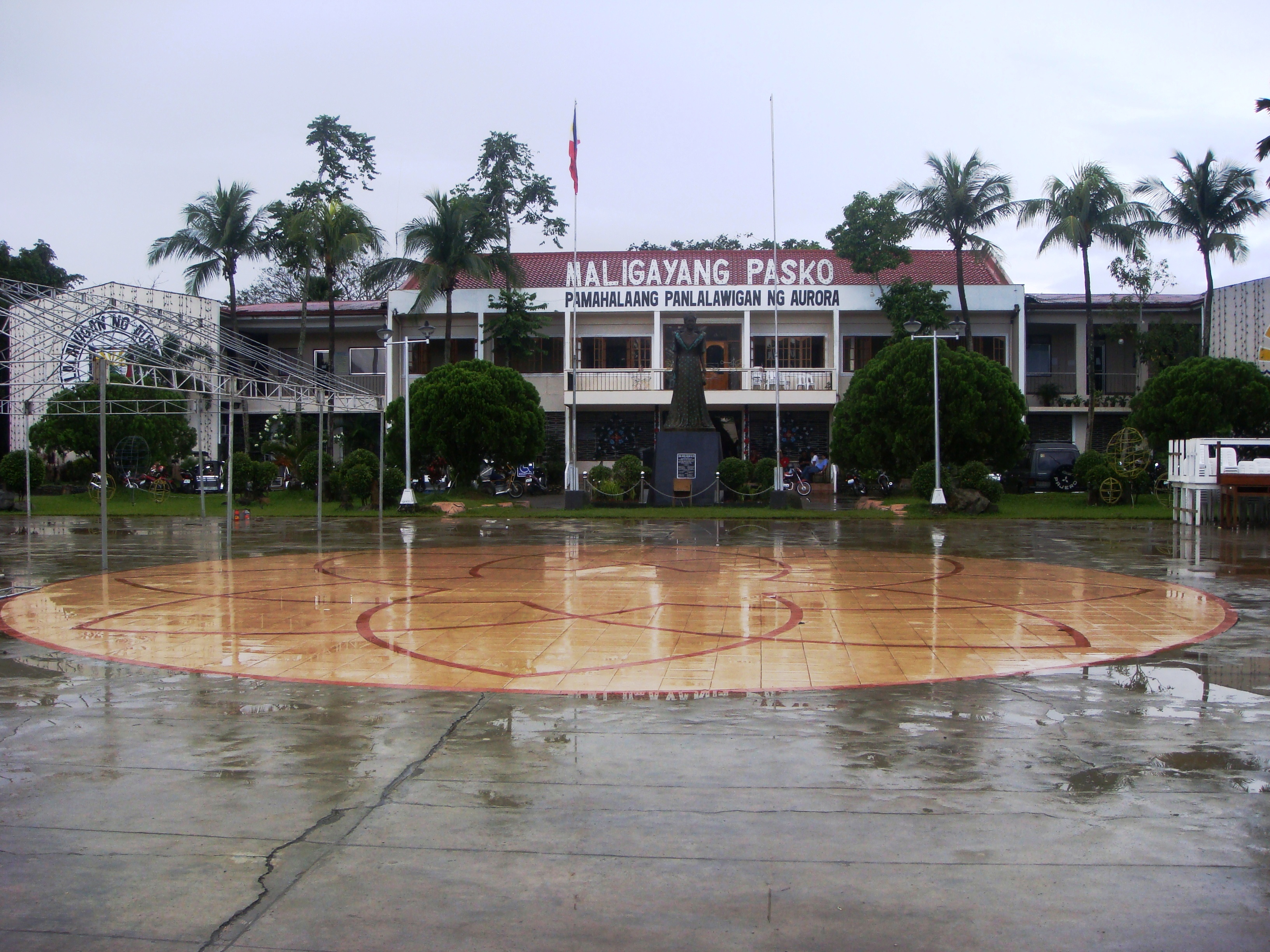
- Aurora Provincial Capitol, Baler

The Aurora Provincial Board is the Sangguniang Panlalawigan (provincial legislature) of the Philippine province of Aurora.

The members are elected via plurality-at-large voting: the province is divided into two districts, each sending four members to the provincial board; the electorate votes for four members, with the four candidates with the highest number of votes being elected. The vice governor is the ex officio presiding officer, and only votes to break ties. The vice governor is elected via the plurality voting system province-wide.

== District apportionment ==
Elections	No. of seats per district		Ex officio seats	Reserved seats	Total seats
Elections	1st	2nd	Ex officio seats	Reserved seats	Total seats
2004–2010	4	4	3	—	11
2010–2025	4	4	3	1	12
2025–present	6	4	3	1	14

== List of members ==
An additional three ex officio members are the presidents of the provincial chapters of the Association of Barangay Captains, the Councilors' League, the Sangguniang Kabataan provincial president; the municipal and city (if applicable) presidents of the Association of Barangay Captains, Councilor's League and Sangguniang Kabataan, shall elect amongst themselves their provincial presidents which shall be their representatives at the board.

=== Current members ===
These are the members after the 2025 local elections and 2023 barangay and SK elections:

- Vice Governor: Patrick Alexis G. Angara (LDP), since September 24, 2025

Seat	Board member	Party	Start of term	End of term
1st district	Pedro M. Ong Jr.	LDP	June 30, 2025	June 30, 2028
1st district	Philippe Jacobson A. Galban	LDP	June 30, 2025	June 30, 2028
1st district	Norma V. Palmero	LDP	June 30, 2022	June 30, 2028
1st district	Mariano C. Tangson	Nacionalista	June 30, 2025	June 30, 2028
1st district	Sherwin G. Amatorio	PFP	June 30, 2025	June 30, 2028
1st district	Mae Ann K. Tolentino	LDP	September 8, 2026	June 30, 2028
2nd district	Ryan Austin K. Tolentino	LDP	March 21, 2025	June 30, 2028
2nd district	Menard M. Amansec	LDP	March 21, 2024	June 30, 2028
2nd district	Jennifer A. Araña	PFP	June 30, 2025	June 30, 2028
2nd district	Sheenalyn B. Tablang	Independent	June 30, 2025	June 30, 2028
ABC	Ruel Joseph Angara	Nonpartisan	January 12, 2024	TBD
PCL	Mara S. Cayetano	LDP	September 16, 2025	June 30, 2028
SK	Lloyd Alsen Delos Reyes	Nonpartisan	November 24, 2023	TBD
IPMR	Randy O. Salo			

=== Vice Governor ===
Election year	Name	Party
2001	Annabella Tangson	
2004	Annabella Tangson	LDP
2007	Gerardo Noveras	PMP
2010	Gerardo Noveras	Liberal
2013	Rommel Angara	LDP
2016	Rommel Angara	LDP
2019	Christian Noveras	PDP–Laban
2022	Gerardo Noveras (Note: Disqualified on September 5, 2023)	PDP–Laban
2022	Reynante Tolentino (Note: Board member elevated to vice governor) (Note: Elevated to governor on April 22, 2024 upon the disqualification of Governor Christian Noveras)	LDP
2022	Jennifer Araña (Note: Board member elevated to vice governor)	PDP–Laban
2025	Isidro P. Galban (Note: Elevated as Governor on September 23, 2025 after the Death of Governor Reynante Tolentino)	LDP
2025	Patrick Alexis G. Angara (Note: Board member elevated to vice governor on September 24, 2025 after Vice-Governor Isidro P. Galban elevated to Governor)	LDP

=== 1st District ===
- Municipalities: Baler, Dingalan, Maria Aurora, San Luis
- Population (2020): 146,445

Election year	Member (party)	Member (party)	Member (party)	Member (party)	Member (party)	Member (party)
2004	Shierwin Taay (Lakas–CMD)	Zenaida Querijero (LDP)	Benjamin Mata (LDP)	Philip Butch Bautista (Lakas–CMD)	—N/a	
2007	Shierwin Taay (LDP)	Oscar Padua (LDP)	Pedro Ong, Jr.	Mariano Tangson (LDP)	—N/a	
2010	Cesar Pimentel (LDP)	Wenceslao Padua (LDP)	Pedro Ong, Jr. (Nacionalista)	Philip Butch Bautista (LDP)	—N/a	
2013	Cesar Pimentel (LDP)	Mariano Tangson (Nacionalista)	Pedro Ong, Jr. (Nacionalista)	Oscar Padua (LDP)	—N/a	
2016	Cesar Pimentel (LDP)	Christian Noveras (NPC)	Jesus Palmero (Nacionalista)	Philip Butch Bautista (LDP)	—N/a	
2019	Isidro Galban (LDP)	Mariano Tangson (Nacionalista)	Jesus Palmero (LDP)	Philip Butch Bautista (LDP)	—N/a	
2022	Philippe Jacobson Galban (LDP)	Annabelle Tangson (Nacionalista)	Jesus Palmero (LDP)	Philip Butch Bautista (Lakas)	—N/a	
2025	Pedro M. Ong Jr. (LDP)	Philippe Jacobson A. Galban (LDP)	Norma V. Palmero (LDP)	Mariano C. Tangson (Nacionalista)	Sherwin G. Amatorio (PFP)	Mae Ann K. Tolentino (LDP)

=== 2nd District ===
- Municipalities: Casiguran, Dilasag, Dinalungan, Dipaculao
- Population (2020): 89,305

Election year	Member (party)	Member (party)	Member (party)	Member (party)
2004	Narciso Amansec (Lakas–CMD)	Pablo Miran (Lakas–CMD)	Renato Pascua (LDP)	Joselito Cabauatan (Lakas–CMD)
2007	Denia Valin (LDP)	Danilo Tolentino	Renato Pascua (LDP)	Joselito Cabauatan (LDP)
2010	Denia Valin (LDP)	Ruben Alipio, Jr. (LDP)	Renato Pascua (LDP)	Joselito Cabauatan (LDP)
2013	Denia Valin (LDP)	Ruben Alipio, Jr. (LDP)	Danilo Tolentino (LDP)	Antonio Curitana (LDP)
2016	Jennifer Araña (LDP)	Ruben Alipio, Jr. (LDP)	Reynante Tolentino (LDP)	Lordan Roxas (NPC)
2019	Jennifer Araña (LDP)	Nick Salamera (NPC)	Eugene Calugtong (LDP)	Lordan Roxas (NPC)
2022	Jennifer Araña (PDP–Laban)	Reynante Tolentino (LDP)	Lito Pascua (LDP)	Lordan Roxas (PDP–Laban)
2022	Vacant	Menard Amansec (Note: Appointed by President Bongbong Marcos on March 1, 2024; took his oath on March 21, 2024.) (LDP)	Lito Pascua (LDP)	Lordan Roxas (PDP–Laban)
2025	Ryan Austin K. Tolentino (LDP)	Menard M. Amansec (LDP)	Jennifer A. Araña (PFP)	Sheenalyn B. Tablang (Independent)
