= Isidro Galban =

Filipino politician

The Honorable Sid Galban
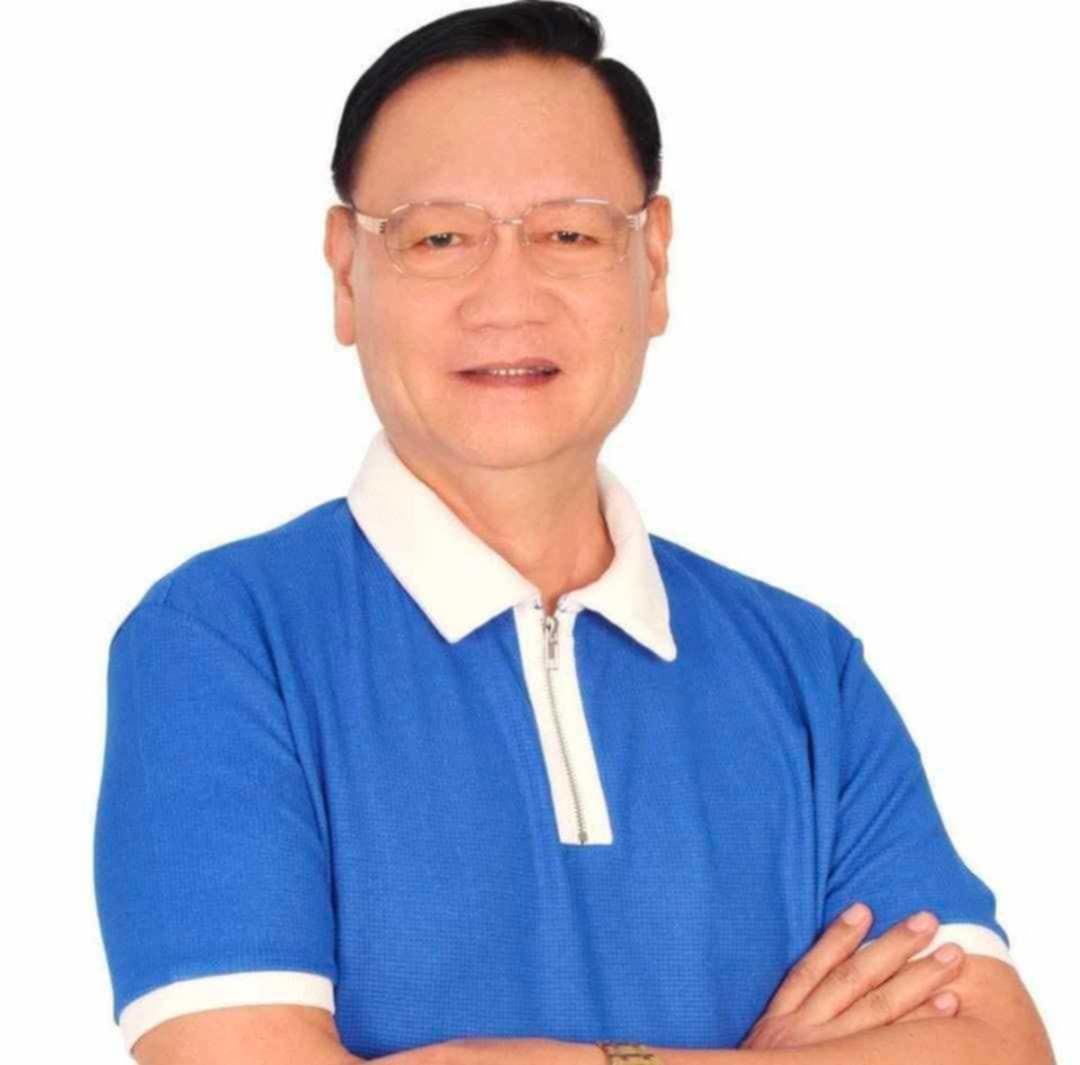
- Official Portrait of Gov. Galban 2025

10th Governor of Aurora
- Incumbent
- Assumed office September 22, 2025
- Vice Governor: Patrick Alexis Angara
- Preceded by: Reynante Tolentino

Vice Governor of Aurora
- In office June 30, 2025 – September 22, 2025
- Governor: Reynante Tolentino
- Preceded by: Jennifer Araña
- Succeeded by: Patrick Alexis Angara

Member of the Aurora Provincial Board from the 1st district
- In office June 30, 2019 – June 30, 2022

Personal details
- Born: Isidro Pimentel Galban; May 15, 1961 (age 65) Baler, Quezon, Philippines
- Party: Laban ng Demokratikong Pilipino
- Spouse: Marivic Acosta Galban
- Education: National University (BS-CE); Philippine Normal University (MAEd)
- Occupation: Politician; Professor; Civil Engineer
- Profession: Engineer

Isidro "Sid" Pimentel Galban (born May 15, 1961) is a Filipino civil engineer, professor, entrepreneur and politician who has served as Governor of Aurora since 2025, elevated following the death of Governor Reynante Tolentino. He previously served as Vice Governor of Aurora from June to September 2025 and Aurora Provincial Board Member from the 1st district from 2019 to 2022.

== See also ==
- List of current Philippine governors
