= Bella Angara =

Filipina politician

The Honorable Bellaflor J. Angara-Castillo
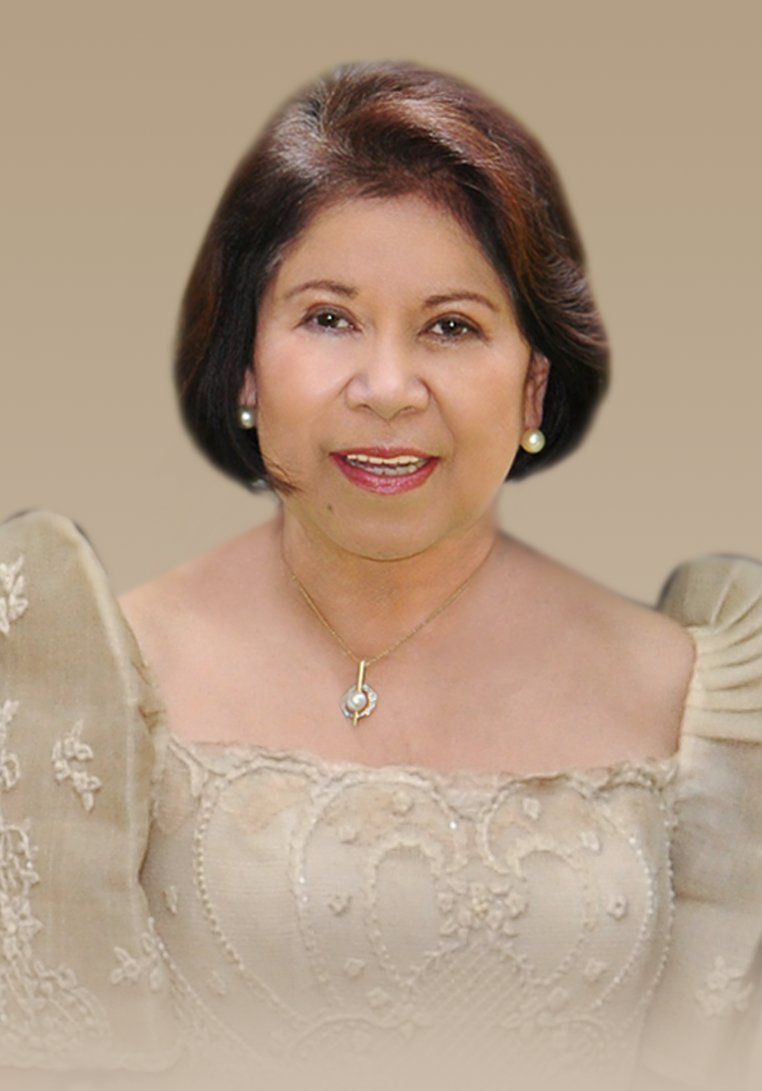

House Majority Leader
- In office November 13, 2000 – January 24, 2001
- Preceded by: Eduardo Gullas
- Succeeded by: Sergio Apostol

Member of the Philippine House of Representatives from Aurora
- In office June 30, 2013 – June 30, 2019
- Preceded by: Juan Edgardo M. Angara
- Succeeded by: Rommel Rico Angara
- In office June 30, 1995 – June 30, 2004
- Preceded by: Benedicto G. Miran
- Succeeded by: Juan Edgardo M. Angara

6th Governor of Aurora
- In office June 30, 2004 – June 30, 2013
- Vice Governor: Annabella Tangson (2004–2007); Gerardo A. Noveras (2007–2013)
- Preceded by: Ramoncita P. Ong
- Succeeded by: Gerardo A. Noveras

Personal details
- Born: Bellaflor Javier Angara; September 14, 1939 (age 87) San Juan, Rizal, Commonwealth of the Philippines
- Party: LDP (2001–present)
- Other political affiliations: LAMMP (1998–2001); Lakas (1995–1998)
- Spouse: Gregorio R. Castillo
- Relations: Edgardo J. Angara (brother), Arturo "Arthur" J. Angara (brother), Juan Edgardo “Sonny” M. Angara (nephew); Rommel Rico T. Angara (nephew); Karen G. Angara-Ularan (niece)
- Education: University of the Philippines Diliman (BS, LL.B.)
- Profession: Lawyer

Bellaflor Javier Angara-Castillo (born September 14, 1939), simply known as Bella Angara, is a former member of the Philippine House of Representatives representing the lone district of Aurora. She previously served three consecutive terms as governor of Aurora province from 2004 to 2013. She was the third female governor of Aurora province. Prior to being governor, she served three consecutive terms as representative of the lone district of Aurora from 1995 to 2004. She was the first and so far the only woman in the history of the Philippine Congress to become House majority floor leader.

== Personal life ==
Bella is the third youngest child among the 10 children of the district’s first elected governor, Dr. Juan C. Angara of Baler, Tayabas (now Aurora) and nurse Juana Javier of Marikina. She is also the younger sister of former Philippine Senator Edgardo J. Angara and former Baler Mayor Arturo "Arthur" J. Angara. She is the aunt of incumbent Philippine Senator Juan Edgardo "Sonny" M. Angara, incumbent Aurora Congressman Rommel Rico T. Angara, and former Baler Vice Mayor Karen G. Angara-Ularan. She married Atty. Gregorio R. Castillo, first placer in the 1957 Philippine Bar Examination and is one of the founding partners of Castillo, Laman, Tan, Panteleon and San Jose Law Firm. Out of their marriage were born four children, namely Joseph Gregson, married to Judith Liwag, Joy Arabelle, married to Fernandino Fontanilla, Jerome Patrick, and Jo Elinore, married to Steve Theodoropoulos. She also has 9 grandchildren, namely, Angelo, Antonio, Andrea Remedios, Sophia Isabel, Constantino, Augusto Miguel, Alexa Kathryn, Jose Gregorio, and Fernando Miguel.

== Education ==
She finished her elementary education at the Baler Central School in 1952 and her secondary education at the Our Lady of Loreto College in Manila. She graduated as cum laude from the University of the Philippines (UP) in Diliman, Quezon City with her Bachelor of Laws (LL.B.) and Bachelor of Science in Jurisprudence degrees in 1962. She was also offered a scholarship for the Master of Laws (LL.M.) Program, at the Yale Law School in New Haven, Connecticut, United States in 1963. She was a participant in the Leaders in Development Program at the John F. Kennedy School of Government at the Harvard University in Cambridge, Massachusetts, USA in 2001.

== Political career ==
She served as representative of the lone district of Aurora in the 10th to 12th Congress from 1995 to 2004. She was the first and only woman in the history of the Philippine Congress to become House majority floor leader. She enacted the greatest number of national bills into law among neophyte lawmakers and sectoral representatives during the 10th Congress. Among the national bills she authored that became landmark legislations were the Magna Carta for Women, the National Caves and Cave Resources Management and Protection Act (Republic Act No. 9072), the National Tourism Policy, the Intellectual Property Code of the Philippines (Republic Act No. 8293), the National Museum Act of 1998 (Republic Act No. 8492), the ECCD Act (Republic Act No. 8980), the Anti-Trafficking in Persons Act of 2003 (Republic Act No. 9208), the Citizenship Retention and Re-acquisition Act of 2003 (Republic Act No. 9225), and the Anti-Violence Against Women and Their Children Act of 2004 (Republic Act No. 9262).

As congresswoman, she acted as representative of the Asian Forum of Parliamentarians on Population and Development (AFPPD) in the special session on ICPD +5 of the United Nations General Assembly (UNGA) in New York City, USA (June 29-July 2, 1999); head of the congressional delegation to the People's Republic of China upon the invitation of the Chinese Association for International Understanding (CAFIU) (June 26-July 3, 2000); congressional delegate to the study tour on population and development in Hanoi and Ho Chi Minh, Vietnam (September 10–16, 2000); chairperson of the sub-committee on Labor Relations of the Congressional Commission on Labor (LaborCom); member of the Congressional LaborCom; voting member of all standing and special committees; vice-chairperson of the committee on rules; senior deputy majority leader (July 1998- November 12, 2000); chairperson of the committee on rules (November 13, 2000 – January 24, 2001); majority leader (November 13, 2000 – January 24, 2001); senior deputy minority leader (January 25, 2005 – June 30, 2001); chairperson of the committee on tourism and economic affairs in the Commission on Appointments (CA) (August 1, 2001- December 31, 2002); co-chairperson of the Philippine Legislator's Committee on Population and Development (PLCPD); and deputy minority leader of the House of Representatives (2003-2004).

She was elected governor of the province of Aurora in 2004 and re-elected in 2007 and in 2010. As the local chief executive of her province, she served as assistant treasurer of the League of Provinces of the Philippines (LPP) (2010-2013), president of the Central Luzon Investment Coordinating Council/Central Luzon Growth Corridor Foundation, Inc. (CLICC-CLGFI) (2007-2013), and member of the national board of the LPP representing Central Luzon. Angara is widely recognized for her socioeconomic contributions and projects during her gubernatorial term.

She was elected representative of the lone district of Aurora in 2013 succeeding her nephew Senator Sonny Angara.

== Awards ==
As representative of the lone district of Aurora for three consecutive terms (1995-2004), she received such distinctive awards as the Diamond Award for Excellence in the Legal Profession/Bar Practice given by the Portia Sorority of the UP College of Law (1994); Woman of Distinction awarded by the Soroptimist Club of Lucena City, Quezon; special citation given by Iota Tau International Legal Sorority Rho Chapter on June 10, 1995; one of the Five Outstanding Women in Law in the Philippines awarded by the Women Lawyers' Association of the Philippines; Outstanding FIDAN awarded by the Federacion Internacional de Abogadas (FIDA Philippine Branch, Inc.) on August 27, 1999; Woman Legislator Promoting Women's Agenda awarded by the National Centennial Commission, women sector, House committee on women, and the Ugnayan ng Kababaihan sa Pulitika in 1998; special citation for being the representative with the most number of national bills enacted into law among the neophyte congressmen and sectoral representatives during the 10th Congress; one of the Most Outstanding Congressmen of the 10th Congress awarded by the Congress Magazine, the Makati School of Journalism and Arts, and the FGTV News Production in 1999; one of the official honorees in the Who's Who in Philippine Nation-Building, 1999 Achievers and Awardees Special Yearbook, awarded by the special projects committee of the Golden Mother and Father Foundation (GMFF) and the Parangal ng Bayan Awards Foundation jointly with the National Consumers Council of the Philippines in 1999; one of the 1999 Golden Parents Awardees, Outstanding Parent Achiever of the Year, awarded by the National Family Week awards committee during the Parangal sa Pamilyang Pilipino '99, Family and Parents' Week awards and celebration; one of 1999 Thirty Most Outstanding Congressmen awarded by the Congress Magazine, the Makati School of Journalism and Arts, and the FGTV News Productions in 2000; most consistent outstanding congressman for three consecutive years, awarded by the Makati Graduate School on January 29, 2001; the Ginintuang Rosas Award as Most Outstanding Woman Civic Leader, given by the Laging Dumamay Foundation, Inc. in December 2000; the Congressional Hall of Fame awardee for having won four consecutive outstanding congressman awards since 1998 awarded by the Congress Magazine and the Makati Graduate School on February 6, 2002; and the Ulirang Ina awardee 2002 chosen by the National Mother's Day and Father's Day Foundation of the Philippines, Inc.

As governor of the province of Aurora for three consecutive terms (2004-2013), she received such awards as the Kabalikat Award given by the Technical Education and Skills Development Authority (TESDA) recognizing her all-out support to skills development and adult education as a measure to create job opportunities and sustainable livelihood among out-of-school youth and helpless rural households in the province of Aurora; Most Outstanding Local Chief Executive for her exemplary performance and support to social welfare and development initiatives awarded by the Association of Local Social Welfare and Development Officers of the Philippines, Inc. (ALSWDOPI) at the Grand Men Seng Hotel in Davao City on September 26, 2007; Most Outstanding Local Chief Executive for her exemplary performance and support to social welfare and development initiatives, awarded by the ALSWDOPI at the Waterfront Hotel in Cebu City on August 27, 2008; Most Outstanding Local Chief Executive in Region 3 for her great passion and dedication to service as exemplified by her extraordinary efforts and selfless contributions to Student Technologist Entrepreneurs of the Philippines (STEP) awarded by the DepEd-STEP 7th STEP Competition in Gapan, Nueva Ecija on October 30, 2008; Most Outstanding Local Chief Executive (National Category) awarded by the STEP at the Teachers' Camp in Baguio on November 20, 2008; the Kabalikat Award (Policy Maker Partner Category) given by the Philippine Council for Industry and Energy Research and Development (PCIERD) at the Pan Pacific Hotel in Malate, Manila on March 18, 2009; Outstanding Culture-Friendly Local Government Official awarded during the World Theater Week recognition by the International Theater Institute and the National Commission for Culture and the Arts (NCCA) at the Malacañan Palace in Manila on March 27, 2009; the Gawad Parangal Hall of Fame, Most Outstanding Local Chief Executive for three consecutive years, awarded by the ALSWDOPI at the Fiesta Pavilion of the Manila Hotel on August 26, 2009; Best Performing Governor, Exemplary Performance on Youth Welfare and Development, awarded by the Pag-asa Youth Association of the Philippines under the Department of Social Welfare and Development (DSWD) Region 3 in Clark, Angeles City on September 24, 2009; the Gawad Kampeon ng Kabataang Pilipino (Local Government Category) conferred by the National Youth Commission (NYC) at the Malacañan Palace in Manila on December 10, 2009; special citation for achieving Universal Coverage under the Sponsored Program, given by the Philippine Health (PhilHealth) Insurance Corporation the Philippine International Convention Center (PICC) Plenary Hall in Pasay on February 12, 2010; Most Child-Friendly Public Servant, 1st National Council for Children's Television-Department of Education (NCCT-DepEd) Lingkod TV Awards, conferred by the NCCT and the DepEd at the Rajah Sulayman Theater at the Fort Santiago in Intramuros, Manila on December 28, 2010; special citations for efficient implementation of Republic Act No. 9003 (Ecological Solid Waste Management Act of 2000) and for exemplary leadership in the effective governance of solid waste and natural resources, given by the National Solid Waste Management Commission (NSWMC) and the Department of Environment and Natural Resources (DENR), respectively, at the Sangguniang Panlalawigan (SP) session hall at the provincial Capitol in Baler, Aurora on June 24, 2011; the Seal of Good Housekeeping given by the Department of the Interior and Local Government (DILG) at the Oxford Hotel in Clark Field, Pampanga on October 19, 2011; the Local Government Unit of the Year 2011, 26th Apolinario Mabini Awards, conferred at the Malacañan Palace in Manila on October 24, 2011; Outstanding Government Official of the Philippines, International Award in Public Service, 18th Annual Chicago Filipino-American (CFA) Hall of Fame 2012, awarded by the CFA community at the Hyatt Regency Chicago Downtown in Chicago, Illinois, USA on April 28, 2012; the Lifetime Achievement Award (Female Category) given by the UP Alumni Association at Ang Bahay ng Alumni, UP Diliman Campus in Quezon City on June 23, 2012; the Gawad Komisyon sa Wikang Filipino (KWF) sa Natatanging Kababaihan sa Mabuting Pamamahala, Ikalimang Taon ng Gawad Quezon, awarded by the KWF at the Bayleaf Hotel in Intramuros, Manila on August 24, 2012; and Most Supportive Governor in Region 3, awarded by the DSWD Field Office III in the City of San Fernando, Pampanga on February 8, 2013.

Among the strategic milestones during her administration as governor include Aurora as the first province to pass Reproductive Health Care Code in the Philippines (2004); the opening of the Aurora Rice Processing and Milling Complex (a grant project from the government of Korea) (2008); the launching of the Aurora E-Village Project (2009); the Mutya ng Pilipinas sa Aurora (2009); the joint declaration of Aurora as an insurgency-free province (2010); the opening of the People Empowerment and Advancement Center for Employment (PEACE) in Baler; the Local Government Unit of the Year, 26th Apolinario Mabini Awards (2011); the Seal of Good Housekeeping Award for the province of Aurora (2012); the first decade celebration of the Philippine-Spanish Friendship Day (2012); the celebration of the 33rd foundation anniversary of Aurora on February 19, 2012 with President Benigno S. Aquino III as the guest of honor; the opening of the new Aurora Memorial Hospital (a grant project from the government of Japan) in Barangay Reserva, Baler; the record-high increase by 1,030% of tourist arrivals in the province of Aurora; Aurora as the province with the lowest crime rate in Central Luzon; Aurora as the province with the largest forest cover in the entire Philippines; Aurora as the top tourism destination in the Philippines; Aurora as the home of the Aurora Pacific Economic Zone and Freeport (APECO); the establishing of the UP School of Health and Sciences Baler Campus; the sisterhood agreement between the province of Aurora and the state of Guam; and the improved road networks in the province of Aurora (construction of Baler-Casiguran Road and Canili-Pantabangan Road).
