= Philippine House Committee on Youth and Sports Development =

Standing committee of the House of Representatives of the Philippines

Committee on Youth and Sports Development
- 20th Congress

History
- New session started: To convene on July 28, 2025

Leadership
- Chairman: Vacant
- Minority Leader: Vacant

Website
- Committee on Youth and Sports Development

The Philippine House Committee on Youth and Sports Development, or House Youth and Sports Development Committee is a standing committee of the Philippine House of Representatives.

== Jurisdiction ==
As prescribed by House Rules, the committee's jurisdiction is on youth development which includes the following:

- Development of their leadership potentials
- Promotion of their moral, physical, intellectual and social well-being including sports development

== Members, 20th Congress ==
As of June 30, 2025, all committee membership positions are vacant until the House convenes for its first regular session on July 28.

== Historical membership rosters ==
=== 18th Congress ===
Position	Members	Party	Province/City	District
Chairperson	John Marvin Nieto	Aksyon	Manila	3rd
Vice Chairpersons	Jericho Jonas Nograles	PBA	Party-list	
Vice Chairpersons	Alberto Pacquiao	OFWFC	Party-list	
Vice Chairpersons	Manuel Luis Lopez	PDP-Laban	Manila	1st
Vice Chairpersons	Jumel Anthony Espino	PDP–Laban	Pangasinan	2nd
Members for the Majority	Divina Grace Yu	PDP–Laban	Zamboanga del Sur	1st
Members for the Majority	Alfred Vargas	PDP–Laban	Quezon City	5th
Members for the Majority	Anthony Peter Crisologo	Lakas–CMD	Quezon City	1st
Members for the Majority	Antonino Calixto	PDP–Laban	Pasay	Lone
Members for the Majority	Carl Nicolas Cari	PDP-Laban	Leyte	5th
Members for the Majority	Eugenio Angelo Barba	Nacionalista	Ilocos Norte	2nd
Members for the Majority	Kristine Alexie Besas-Tutor	Nacionalista	Bohol	3rd
Members for the Majority	Ian Paul Dy	NPC	Isabela	3rd
Members for the Majority	John Reynald Tiangco	Partido Navoteño	Navotas	Lone
Members for the Majority	Rommel Rico Angara	LDP	Aurora	Lone
Members for the Majority	Jake Vincent Villa	NPC	Siquijor	Lone
Members for the Majority	Ed Christopher Go	Nacionalista	Isabela	2nd
Members for the Majority	Faustino Michael Dy V	PDP-Laban	Isabela	6th
Members for the Majority	Braeden John Biron	Nacionalista	Iloilo	4th
Members for the Majority	Jose Teves Jr.	TGP	Party-list	
Members for the Majority	Strike Revilla	NP	Cavite	2nd
Members for the Majority	Elizalde Co	AKO BICOL	Party-list	
Members for the Majority	Dale Malapitan	PDP–Laban	Caloocan	1st
Members for the Majority	Antonio Albano	Lakas	Isabela	1st
Members for the Majority	Samantha Louise Vargas-Alfonso	NUP	Cagayan	2nd
Members for the Majority	Alyssa Sheena Tan	PDP-Laban	Isabela	4th
Members for the Majority	Edward Maceda	NPC	Manila	4th
Members for the Majority	Faustino Michael Carlos Dy III	NPC	Isabela	5th
Members for the Majority	Ducielle Marie Cardema	Duterte Youth	Party-list	
Members for the Minority	Sarah Jane Elago	Kabataan	Party-list	
Members for the Minority	Irene Gay Saulog	KALINGA	Party-list	
Members for the Minority	Argel Joseph Cabatbat	MAGSASAKA	Party-list	

==== Chairperson ====
- Eric Martinez (Valenzuela City–2nd, PDP–Laban) July 22, 2019 – October 6, 2020

=== 19th Congress ===
Position	Members	Party	Province/City	District
Chairperson	Faustino Michael Carlos Dy III	Lakas	Isabela	5th
Vice Chairpersons	Margarita Ignacia Nograles	PBA	Party-list	
Vice Chairpersons	Charisse Anne Hernandez	Lakas	Calamba	Lone
Vice Chairpersons	Richard Gomez	PDP-Laban	Leyte	4th
Vice Chairpersons	Eric Buhain	Nacionalista	Batangas	1st
Vice Chairpersons	Jeyzel Victoria Yu	PDP–Laban	Zamboanga del Sur	2nd
Vice Chairpersons	Francisco Paolo Ortega V	NPC	La Union	1st
Vice Chairpersons	Aniela Bianca Tolentino	NUP	Cavite	8th
Vice Chairpersons	Jernie Jett Nisay	Pusong Pinoy	Party-list	
Vice Chairpersons	Michael Romero	1-Pacman	Party-list	
Vice Chairpersons	Lord Allan Jay Velasco	NPC	Marinduque	Lone
Members for the Majority	Eric Martinez	PDP–Laban	Valenzuela	2nd
Members for the Majority	Antonio Albano	Lakas	Isabela	1st
Members for the Majority	Rommel Rico Angara	LDP	Aurora	Lone
Members for the Majority	Julienne Baronda	NUP	Iloilo City	Lone
Members for the Majority	Arnulf Bryan Fuentebella	NPC	Camarines Sur	4th
Members for the Majority	Romulo Peña Jr.	Liberal	Makati	1st
Members for the Majority	Adolph Edward Plaza	NUP	Agusan del Sur	2nd
Members for the Majority	Jose Teves Jr.	TGP	Party-list	
Members for the Majority	Christian Unabia	Lakas	Misamis Oriental	1st
Members for the Majority	William Irwin Tieng	Lakas	Manila	5th
Members for the Majority	Yevgeny Vicente Emano	Nacionalista	Misamis Oriental	2nd
Members for the Majority	Cheeno Miguel Almario	Lakas	Davao Oriental	2nd
Members for the Majority	Adrian Michael Amatong	Liberal	Zamboanga del Norte	3rd
Members for the Majority	Juan Carlos Atayde	Nacionalista	Quezon City	1st
Members for the Majority	Mary Mitzi Cajayon-Uy	PDP–Laban	Caloocan	2nd
Members for the Majority	Aminah Dimaporo	Lakas	Lanao del Norte	2nd
Members for the Majority	Dante Garcia	PRP	La Union	2nd
Members for the Majority	Tsuyoshi Anthony Horibata	PDP–Laban	Camarines Sur	1st
Members for the Majority	Sittie Shahara Mastura	Lakas	Maguindanao del Norte	Lone
Members for the Majority	Peter Miguel	NUP	South Cotabato	2nd
Members for the Majority	Joseph Tan	Lakas	Isabela	4th
Members for the Majority	Emigdio Tanjuatco III	Liberal	Rizal	2nd
Members for the Majority	Patrick Michael Vargas	Lakas	Quezon City	5th
Members for the Majority	Miguel Luis Villafuerte	PDP–Laban	Camarines Sur	5th
Members for the Majority	Alan 1 Ecleo	Lakas	Dinagat Islands	Lone
Members for the Majority	Marvin Rillo	Lakas	Quezon City	4th
Members for the Majority	Jason Almonte	PDP–Laban	Misamis Occidental	1st
Members for the Majority	Keith Micah Tan	NPC	Quezon	4th
Members for the Majority	Antonio Agapito Legarda	NPC	Antique (province)	Lone
Members for the Majority	Jaime Cojuangco	NPC	Tarlac	1st
Members for the Majority	Christian Tell Yap	NPC	Tarlac	2nd
Members for the Majority	Bryan Revilla	AGIMAT	Party-list	
Members for the Majority	Jose Aquino II	Lakas	Agusan del Norte	1st
Members for the Majority	Ralph Wendel Tulfo	Nacionalista	Quezon City	2nd
Members for the Minority	Harris Christopher Ongchuan	NUP	Northern Samar	2nd
Members for the Minority	Jonathan Clement Abalos II	4Ps	Party-list	
Members for the Minority	Raoul Daniel Manuel	Kabataan	Party-list	
Members for the Minority	Ramon Rodrigo Gutierrez	1-Rider	Party-list	

== See also ==
- House of Representatives of the Philippines
- List of Philippine House of Representatives committees
- National Youth Commission
- Philippine Sports Commission
