= Karen Angara-Ularan =

Filipino politician

The Honorable Karen G. Angara-Ularan

Vice Mayor of Baler, Aurora
- In office June 30, 2013 – June 30, 2016

Member of the Aurora Provincial Board representing the Philippine Councilors League
- In office 2010–2013

Member of the Baler Municipal Council
- In office June 30, 2010 – June 30, 2013

Personal details
- Born: Karen Gonzales Angara; January 3, 1973 (age 53) Manila, Philippines
- Party: LDP
- Spouse: Raymond Ularan
- Relations: Arturo "Arthur" J. Angara (father); Edgardo J. Angara (uncle), Bellaflor J. Angara-Castillo (aunt), Juan Edgardo "Sonny" M. Angara (cousin); Rommel Rico T. Angara (cousin)
- Children: 2

Karen Angara-Ularan (born Karen Gonzales Angara; January 3, 1973) is a Filipina politician. She was the vice mayor of the municipality of Baler in the Philippine province of Aurora from 2013 to 2016. She was a former president of the provincial federation of the Philippine Councilors' League (PCL), Aurora Chapter, who served as an ex officio member of the Sangguniang Panlalawigan (SP), or provincial board or legislature, of Aurora province from 2010 to 2013.

== Personal life ==
She is the younger of the two children of former Baler Mayor Arturo "Arthur" J. Angara, a dentist, and Justita F. Gonzales.

She is a niece of former Philippine Senator Edgardo J. Angara and incumbent Aurora Representative Bellaflor J. Angara-Castillo. She is a cousin of incumbent Philippine Senator Juan Edgardo "Sonny" M. Angara and incumbent Aurora Congressman Rommel Rico T. Angara.

She and her husband, Raymond Ularan, have two children, Patrick Alexis and Tyrone.

== Education ==
She obtained her secondary education from the University of Santo Tomas (UST) High School in Manila and her Bachelor of Science in Commerce (BSC) degree, with marketing as her area of specialization, in 1992 from the University of the East (UE) also in Manila.

== Professional life ==
She started to work as a private secretary in the local government of Baler in 2004. Later, she was designated as an executive assistant in the same local government.

== Political career ==
She was elected to the Sangguniang Bayan (SB), or municipal council or legislature, of Baler in the May 10, 2010 Philippine elections.

She was elected president of the provincial federation of the Philippine Councilors' League (PCL), Aurora Chapter in September 2010. As such, she served as an ex officio member of the Sangguniang Panlalawigan (SP) of Aurora province from 2010 to 2013.

As a municipal councilor, she chaired the committee on health, the committee on tourism, and the committee on agriculture. She was also an active member of the committee on environment and natural resources, the committee on cooperatives, and the committee on trade and industry. She authored nine municipal ordinances and 18 resolutions on livelihood development, environmental protection, health care, and promotion of tourism in Baler.

As a provincial board member, she chaired the committee on cooperatives, skills development, and livelihood and the committee on socio-economic planning and development. She was also an active member of the committee on tourism, the committee on social welfare, relief services, women and family, and the committee on good governance, public ethics, and accountability. She authored more or less than 30 resolutions in the provincial board.

She launched medical and dental missions in the different municipalities in Aurora province, particularly in Dingalan, Dipaculao, and Dinalungan. Part of such activities was the distribution of free medicines among rural health units (BHUs) and barangay health centers (BHCs). She proposed that the PCL, Aurora Chapter be provided with a multipurpose hall of its own.

She ran for mayor of Baler in the May 9, 2016 Philippine elections. She lost, however, in the mayoral race, conceding defeat to incumbent Mayor Nelianto "Pilot" C. Bihasa. A day after the election, she publicly announced her gratitude to all her townspeople who supported her candidacy. It was observed that she even organized and led a post-campaign clean-up drive to remove all her campaign flyers and posters in the municipality of Baler.
