= Rommel T. Angara =

Filipino politician

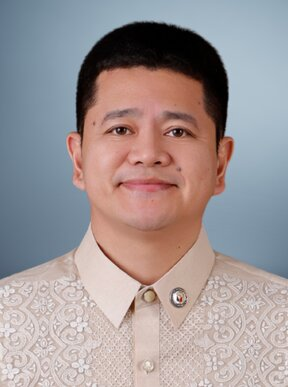
- Official portrait, 2025

Member of the Philippine House of Representatives from Aurora's Lone District
- Incumbent
- Assumed office June 30, 2019
- Preceded by: Bellaflor J. Angara-Castillo

Vice Governor of Aurora
- In office June 30, 2013 – June 30, 2019
- Governor: Gerardo Noveras
- Preceded by: Gerardo Noveras
- Succeeded by: Christian Noveras

Personal details
- Born: Rommel Rico Teh Angara; December 19, 1978 (age 47) Quezon City, Philippines
- Party: LDP (2012–present)
- Spouse: Lai Antonio
- Relations: Edgardo J. Angara (uncle), Bellaflor J. Angara-Castillo (aunt), Arturo J. Angara (uncle); Juan Edgardo "Sonny" M. Angara (cousin); Karen G. Angara-Ularan (cousin)
- Children: 3

Rommel Rico Teh Angara (born December 19, 1978), better known as Rommel T. Angara is a Filipino politician. He is the incumbent representative of the lone district of Aurora elected in May 2019. He was the acting governor of the province of Aurora from mid-2018 to early 2019. He was the vice governor of the same province from 2013 to 2019. As a former vice governor, he acted as the presiding officer of the Sangguniang Panlalawigan, or the provincial board or legislature, of Aurora province.

== Personal life ==
He is a son of former Baler Mayor Joselito J. Angara and Loyola Teh, a medical specialist. He is a nephew of former Philippine Senator Edgardo J. Angara, former Aurora Representative Bellaflor J. Angara-Castillo, and former Baler Mayor Arturo J. Angara. He is a cousin of Secretary of Education Juan Edgardo "Sonny" M. Angara and former Baler Vice Mayor Karen G. Angara-Ularan.

He is married to Lai Antonio. They have three children: Jacob Miguel, Ceanna Gail, and Jared Samuel.

== Professional life ==
He served as congressional chief of staff of then Aurora Representative Juan Edgardo “Sonny” M. Angara from 2004 to 2013.

== Political career ==
He ran for vice governor of Aurora province in the May 14, 2007 Philippine elections under the Laban ng Demokratikong Pilipino (LDP) party with then incumbent Governor Bellaflor J. Angara-Castillo who would be serving her second term of office as local chief executive of Aurora province. sadly he lost, however, in the vice gubernatorial race. He conceded defeat to Atty. Gerardo "Jerry" A. Noveras of the Liberal Party (LP), who became Aurora governor six years later.

He ran again for vice governor of Aurora province in the May 13, 2013 Philippine elections with then outgoing Baler Mayor Arturo J. Angara running for governor. During the campaign period, he expressed distaste for the illegal numbers game jueteng concealed in the so-called small town lottery (STL) reportedly with operations in almost all provinces in Central Luzon, except in Aurora province. He stated that he was not in favor of the STL which he called “a mere front for jueteng.” He explained that “although STL is a source of livelihood, the poor are still the losers because only the operators earn and benefit from it.” He eventually won a landslide victory in the vice gubernatorial race with a margin of 11,025 votes over his opponent, former Aurora provincial administrator and former Baler Mayor Emilio "Emil" F. Etcubañez.

He was the acting governor of the province of Aurora from mid-2018 to early 2019. In the May 13, 2019 elections, he was elected representative of the lone district of Aurora.

House of Representatives of the Philippines
Preceded by Bellaflor J. Angara-Castillo	Representative, Lone District of Aurora; 2019–present	Incumbent
Political offices
Preceded by Gerardo Noveras	Vice Governor of Aurora; 2013–2019	Succeeded by Christian Noveras
