= Arthur Angara =

Filipino politician and national awardee

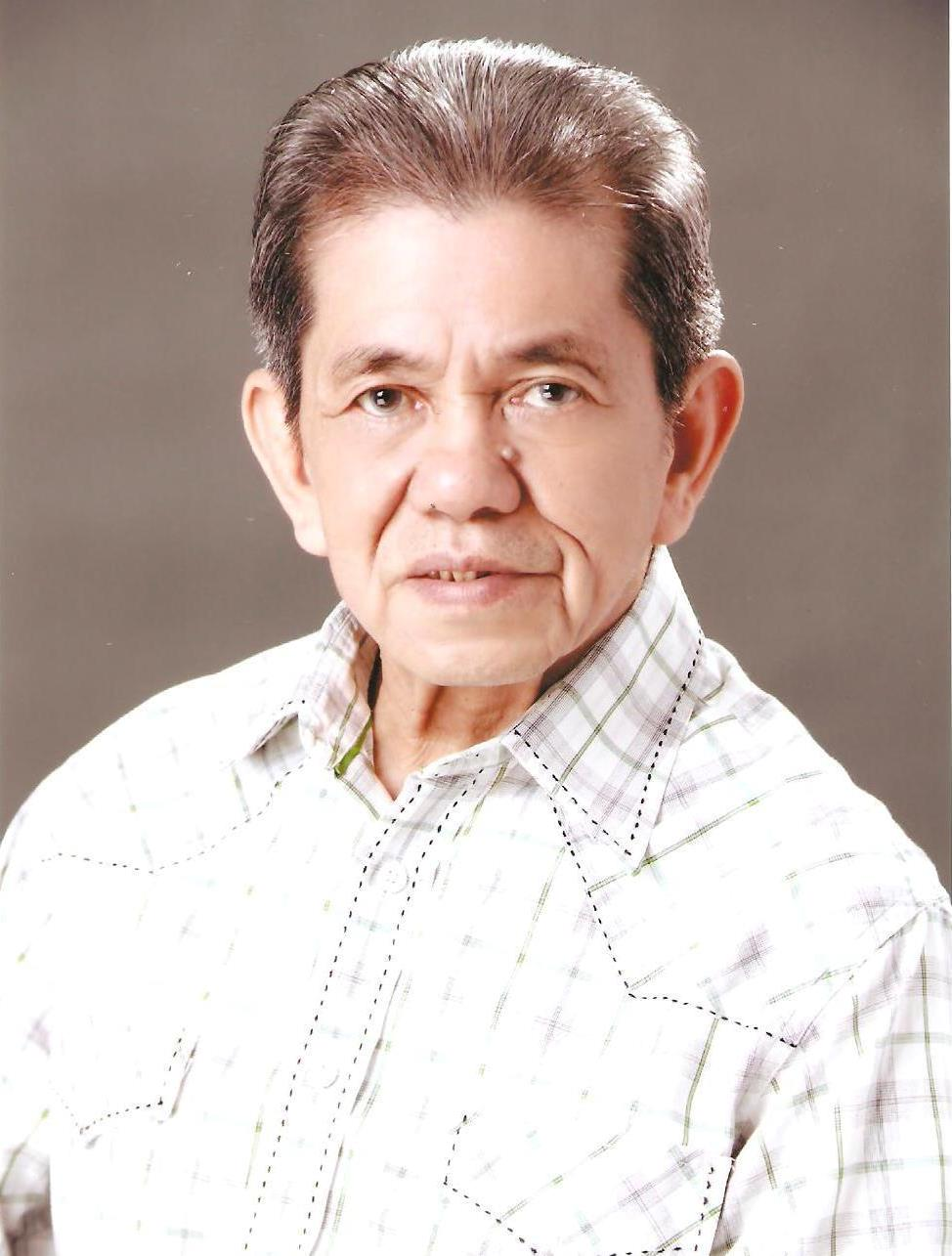

National Adviser for the League of Municipalities of the Philippines
- In office 2007–2010

National Deputy Secretary-General of the League of Municipalities of the Philippines

Mayor of Baler, Aurora
- In office June 30, 2004 – June 30, 2013
- In office June 30, 1992 – June 30, 2001

Personal details
- Born: Arturo Javier Angara; February 7, 1937 Baler, Tayabas, Philippines
- Died: November 16, 2022 (aged 85) Baler, Aurora, Philippines
- Party: LDP (1992-2022)
- Spouse: Justita "Tita" F. Gonzales
- Relations: Karen G. Angara-Ularan (daughter); Edgardo J. Angara (brother); Bellaflor J. Angara-Castillo (sister); Juan Edgardo “Sonny” M. Angara (nephew); Rommel Rico T. Angara (nephew)
- Children: Ruel Joseph; Karen
- Profession: Dentist

Arturo Javier Angara (February 7, 1937 – November 16, 2022), otherwise known as Arthur Angara or AJA, was a Filipino politician, dentist, and national awardee for public service. He was the former national deputy secretary-general of and former national adviser for the League of Municipalities of the Philippines (LMP). He was the longest-serving mayor of the municipality of Baler in the Philippine province of Aurora, with his terms of office covering a period of 18 years.

== Personal life ==
Angara is the seventh of the 10 children of Dr. Juan C. Angara of Baler, Tayabas (now part of Aurora) and Juana Javier of Marikina. He married Justita F. Gonzales of Baler in 1969. Out of their marriage were born two children, namely Ruel Joseph and Karen, incumbent vice mayor of Baler. He is a younger brother of former Philippine Senator Edgardo J. Angara and an elder brother of incumbent Aurora Representative Bellaflor J. Angara-Castillo. He is an uncle of incumbent Philippine Senator Juan Edgardo “Sonny” M. Angara and incumbent Aurora Vice Governor Rommel Rico T. Angara.

== Education ==
He finished grade school at the Baler Elementary School (now Baler Central School) in Baler, Quezon (now Aurora) and high school at the Roosevelt Memorial High School in San Juan, Metro Manila. He finished his Doctor of Dental Medicine (DMD) degree at the University of the East in Sampaloc, Manila in 1960, the same year when he passed the Dentist Licensure Examination, in which he ranked 12th.

== Professional life ==
He served as president of the Aurora Dental Association, head of the Baler Water District Office, and member of the Knights of Columbus.

== Death ==
He died in Baler, Aurora, Philippines on November 16, 2022.

== Political career ==
He was elected mayor of Baler in 1992, re-elected to a second term in 1995, and a third term in 1998 under the Laban ng Demokratikong Pilipino (LDP), the political party of his elder brother, Senator Edgardo J. Angara. After three years of living a civilian life, he made a political comeback, being elected mayor of Baler in 2004, re-elected in 2007 and in 2010 under the same party. His terms of office as municipal mayor from 1992 to 2001 and from 2004 to 2013 made him the longest-serving mayor of Baler.

As municipal mayor, he implemented a sound fiscal management system of the local government unit (LGU) of Baler for which this town was awarded as most outstanding accounting local government sector awardee (municipal level) and top revenue district taxpayer (local government unit category); reformed the business permit and licensing system and simplified the process of business registration in the municipality of Baler; sped up civil registration services and conducted information education and mobile registration; upgraded the medical equipment and facilities at the Aurora Memorial Hospital; rendered free medical and dental services for the people of Baler; provided assistance to the elderly, preschool children, and persons with disabilities (PWDs); constructed the Farmers’ Information and Technology Services (FITS) Center, the Farm Level Grains Center (FLGC), the Municipal Food Terminal (MFT), farm-to-market roads (FMRs), and post-harvest facilities; implemented the ecological solid waste management program for which Baler was awarded as best solid waste implementor and cleanest and greenest municipality (1st place, urban category) in the Gawad Punong-Lalawigan para sa Kapaligiran; preserved the cultures and history of Baler through the construction and maintenance of the Museo de Baler; and ensured proper utilization of the Special Education Fund (SEF) for school facilities, for educational research, and for additional teachers and classrooms, awarded scholarships to financially poor but academically qualified students, and extended financial assistance for the DepEd’s Alternative Learning System (ALS).

He ran for governor of Aurora province in the May 13, 2013 Philippine gubernatorial elections. He was fielded for the top provincial post by the aforementioned senator who first announced gubernatorial bid and filed certificate of candidacy (COC) for governor but later backed out of gubernatorial race due to international commitments. He was defeated, however, by then Vice Governor Gerardo “Jerry” A. Noveras who won by a margin of over 11,000 votes. He conceded defeat with a wish that Noveras would "continue to pursue the vision of the Angaras for development."

== Awards ==
He received distinctive national and regional awards for public service such as the Seal of Good Housekeeping for outstanding performance and exemplary practice in the field of fiscal management and full compliance with the disclosure policy of President Benigno S. Aquino III's administration for the LGUs, conferred by the Department of the Interior and Local Government (DILG) on October 4, 2011; first place for documented streamlined procedures on the issuance of mayor's permit (3rd-4th class municipal category), given by the Central Luzon Growth Corridor Foundation, Inc. (CLGCFI) and the Department of Trade and Industry (DTI) Region III on April 27, 2011; the 2009 presidential citations for best practices in creating a business and investment enabling environment, given by President Gloria Macapagal Arroyo on July 8, 2009; the Hall of Fame for documented streamlined procedures on the issuance of mayor's permit (3rd-4th class municipal category), given by the CLGCFI on March 26, 2009; the Golden Eagle Award for best practices in streamlining of business permits and other licenses; most outstanding accounting local government sector (municipal level) and top revenue district taxpayer (local government unit category); first place for documented streamlined procedures on the issuance of mayor's permit (3rd-4th class municipal category), given by the CLGCFI and the DTI Region III from 2006 to 2008; the Gold, Silver, Bronze Merit Award conferred by the Boy Scouts of the Philippines (BSP) National Council; the Punong Bayan Award of Excellence conferred by the LMP in December 2004; and the Human Resource Achievement Award (Outstanding Human Resource Local Chief Executive) and the Awards of Excellence given by the Civil Service Commission (CSC) on September 30, 1997.
