= Dilasag =

Municipality in Aurora, Philippines

- Municipality
- Municipality of Dilasag
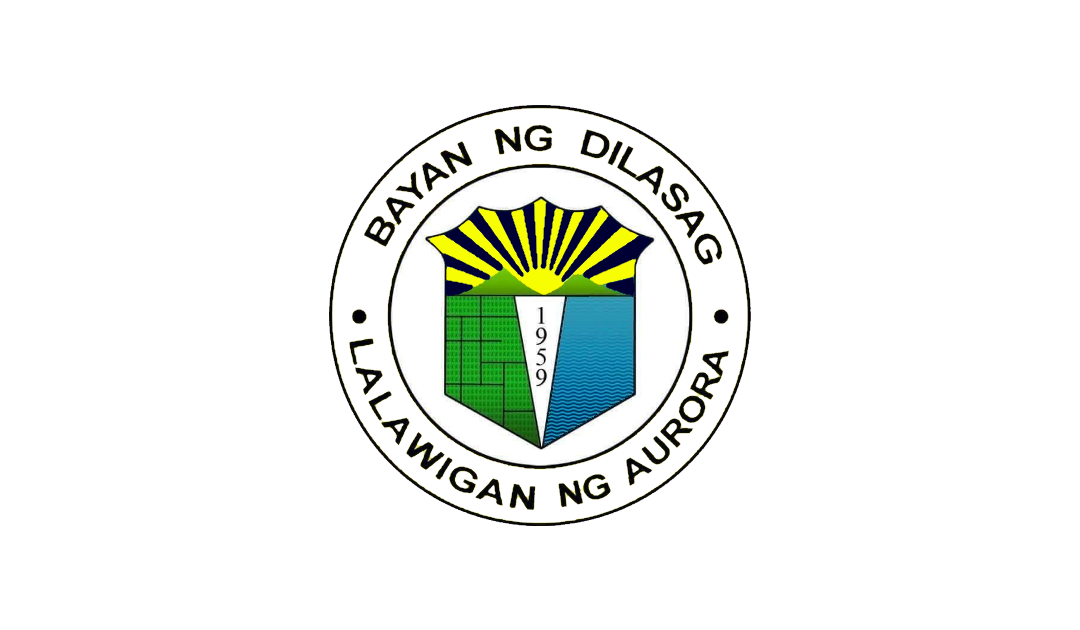
- Flag
- Nickname: Gateway to the Madre Valley
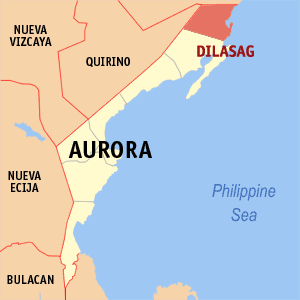
- Map of Aurora with Dilasag highlighted
- Interactive map of Dilasag
- Location within the Philippines
- Coordinates: 16°24′N 122°13′E
- Country: Philippines
- Region: Central Luzon
- Province: Aurora
- District: Lone district
- Founded: 1959
- Conversion into municipality: June 18, 1966
- Barangays: 11 (see Barangays)

Government
  - Type: Sangguniang Bayan
  - Mayor: Joe P. Gorospe
  - Vice Mayor: Janice B. Villareal
  - Representative: Rommel Rico T. Angara
  - Municipal Council: Members: Francisco C. Alonzo; Janice B. Villareal; Reydee G. Bartolome; Maryvic E. de Gracia; Jennilyn L. Briones; Evangeline G. Magtangob; Keen Dayson A. Pascua; Alberto T. Ancheta
  - Electorate: 11,644 voters (2025)

Area
  - Total: 306.25 km^{2} (118.24 sq mi)
- Elevation: 11.9 m (39 ft)

Population (2024 census)
  - Total: 17,536
  - Density: 57.260/km^{2} (148.30/sq mi)
  - Households: 4,228

Economy
  - Income class: 2nd municipal income class
  - Poverty incidence: 15.31% (2023)
  - Revenue: ₱ 178.1 million (2024)
  - Assets: ₱ 393.6 million (2024)
  - Expenditure: ₱ 174.6 million (2024)
  - Liabilities: ₱ 64.65 million (2024)

Service provider
  - Electricity: Aurora Electric Cooperative (AURELCO)
- Time zone: UTC+8 (PST)
- ZIP code: 3205
- PSGC: 0307703000
- IDD : area code: +63 (0)42
- Native languages: Kasiguranin; Ilocano; Tagalog
- Website: www.dilasag-aurora.gov.ph

Dilasag [ˌdilɐˈsag], officially the Municipality of Dilasag (Tagalog/Kasiguranin: Bayan ng Dilasag; Ilocano: Ili ti Dilasag), is a municipality in the province of Aurora, Philippines. According to the 2024 census, it has a population of 17,536 people.

== History ==
The name "Dilasag" is divided into two syllables. The prefix Di in the native language means "abundance", added to the word lasag which means "meat". The coined word "Dilasag", however, does not only mean abundance of meat in the place, but also of forest products, marine products and minerals.

In early 1924, a group of Ilocano settlers with a number of Kapampangans and Pangasinenses from Tarlac arrived in Casiguran, which was then part of Nueva Vizcaya.

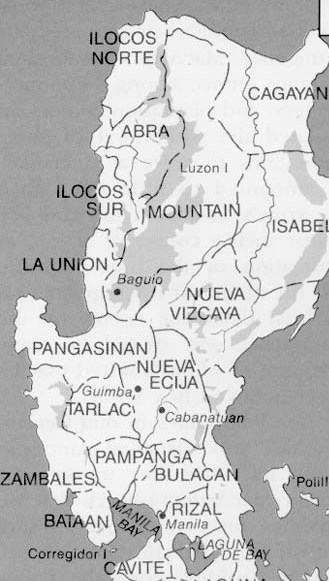
An old map showing the current northern territory of Aurora as part of Nueva Vizcaya.

Finding the natives unfriendly to them, the settlers moved along the coastline going north and settled finally in what is now called Dilasag. The place was considered habitable, because the native Dumagats, particularly Casiguran Agta, in the place were friendly. Later, more families came, establishing a community. This community was soon recognized by the mayor of Casiguran, by then a municipality of Quezon. It was declared a sitio of barangay Culat and eventually a barrio of Casiguran in consideration of its rapid progress and development.

In 1959, Quezon 1st District Representative Manuel Enverga introduced House Bill No. 2863 in the House of Representatives, which was later enacted into law with the passage of Republic Act No. 2452 on June 21, 1959, making Dilasag a municipal district and separating it from Casiguran. It was converted into a municipality on June 18, 1966. It was then part of the province of Quezon under its sub-province of Aurora until the latter became a province of its own in 1979.

== Geography ==
According to the Philippine Statistics Authority, the municipality has a land area of 306.25 square kilometers (118.24 sq mi) constituting 9.73% of the 3,147.32-square-kilometer- (1,215.19 sq mi) total area of Aurora.

Dilasag is situated 138.07 kilometers (85.79 mi) from the provincial capital Baler, and 390.38 kilometers (242.57 mi) from the country's capital city of Manila. It is the northernmost municipality in Central Luzon.

=== Barangays ===
Dilasag is politically subdivided into 11 barangays. Each barangay consists of puroks and some have sitios.

PSGC	Barangay	Population			±% p.a.	
		2024		2010		
037703001	Diagyan	13.8%	2,418	2,537	▾	−0.33%
037703002	Dicabasan	4.2%	734	677	▴	0.56%
037703003	Dilaguidi	5.2%	915	1,015	▾	−0.72%
037703004	Dimaseset	8.1%	1,420	1,408	▴	0.06%
037703005	Diniog	14.2%	2,485	2,331	▴	0.45%
037703011	Esperanza	7.2%	1,266	1,241	▴	0.14%
037703006	Lawang	2.9%	511	379	▴	2.10%
037703007	Maligaya (Poblacion)	10.7%	1,869	1,801	▴	0.26%
037703008	Manggitahan	9.9%	1,742	1,760	▾	−0.07%
037703009	Masagana (Poblacion)	10.5%	1,841	1,822	▴	0.07%
037703010	Ura	3.6%	634	712	▾	−0.80%
	Total		17,536	15,683	▴	0.78%

=== Climate ===
Climate data for Dilasag, Aurora
Month	Jan	Feb	Mar	Apr	May	Jun	Jul	Aug	Sep	Oct	Nov	Dec	Year
Mean daily maximum °C (°F)	25 (77)	26 (79)	27 (81)	30 (86)	31 (88)	30 (86)	30 (86)	30 (86)	29 (84)	28 (82)	27 (81)	25 (77)	28 (83)
Mean daily minimum °C (°F)	21 (70)	21 (70)	22 (72)	23 (73)	24 (75)	24 (75)	24 (75)	24 (75)	24 (75)	23 (73)	23 (73)	22 (72)	23 (73)
Average precipitation mm (inches)	96 (3.8)	77 (3.0)	66 (2.6)	59 (2.3)	119 (4.7)	133 (5.2)	159 (6.3)	143 (5.6)	152 (6.0)	243 (9.6)	218 (8.6)	200 (7.9)	1,665 (65.6)
Average rainy days	17.7	14.7	14.9	13.7	19.9	20.6	24.2	24.0	23.5	21.8	21.5	21.4	237.9
Source: Meteoblue (modeled/calculated data, not measured locally)

== Demographics ==
Population census of Dilasag
Year	Pop.	±% p.a.
1960	2,481	—
1970	5,995	+9.21%
1975	3,566	−9.89%
1980	6,716	+13.49%
1990	11,195	+5.24%
1995	12,825	+2.58%
2000	14,676	+2.93%
2007	14,833	+0.15%
2010	15,683	+2.05%
2015	15,835	+0.18%
2020	17,102	+1.63%
2024	17,536	+0.60%
Source: Philippine Statistics Authority

In the 2024 census, Dilasag had a population of 17,536 people. The population density was 57 inhabitants per square kilometer (150/sq mi).

== Economy ==
Poverty incidence of Dilasag (%)

Source: Philippine Statistics Authority

== Tourism ==
The coastal areas of Dilasag feature white sand beaches and fresh seafood. With its mountainous terrain, Dilasag also provides an ideal venue for trekking and mountain-climbing.

- Canawer Beach
- Parang Hills
- Diniog Beach
- Mangrove Forest Park
- Singep Falls

The municipality is also home to the Amro River Protected Landscape.

== Education ==
The Dilasag Schools District Office governs all educational institutions within the municipality. It oversees the management and operations of all private and public, from primary to secondary schools.

=== Primary and elementary schools ===
- Camilo Osias Elementary School
- Diagyan Elementary School
- Dianao Elementary School
- Dicabasan Elementary School
- Dilaguidi Elementary School
- Dilasag Adventist Elementary School
- Dilasag Central School
- Dimaseset Elementary School
- Diniog Elementary School
- Kasaysayan Elementary School
- Lawang Elementary School
- Lawang West Elementary School
- Manggitahan Elementary School
- Pedro Orata Elementary School
- Ura Elementary School

=== Secondary schools ===
- Diagyan National High School
- Dilasag National High School
- Dimaseset National High School
- Diniog National High School
- Manggitahan National High School
