= Congressional Commission on Science and Technology and Engineering =

The Congressional Commission on Science and Technology and Engineering (COMSTE) was created by a joint resolution of the 13th Congress of the Philippines to create, amend, or repeal laws and propose budgets that will make the Philippines competitive in science and technology.

== Goals of the COMSTE ==
COMSTE will review and assess the state of science, technology, and engineering in the Philippines, and will provide recommendations on harnessing these sectors to make the country more competitive. It will also undertake a thorough review of science education in public and private schools, particularly at the graduate level.

The Commission shall review and assess the formal educational system in both public and private schools at all levels, including graduate education. The Commission shall also review and assess the non-formal educational system. It shall produce a report of its findings and shall formulate short and long term policy and program recommendations to include each of the following areas: (i) Philosophy, goals and objectives of science and technology and engineering, (ii) Sectoral targets; (iii) Governance and management; (iv) Educational / manpower development programs; (v) Financing; (vi) Functional linkages among all departments and sectors concerned with science and technology and engineering R&D; and (vii) Educator's training, benefits and retirement.

The report and the recommendation for both executive policy and legislative action will be drawn from the analysis by the Commission of the Philippine Science and Technology and Engineering research and development system, based on research of existing studies and other secondary sources of data, on extensive consultations with relevant stakeholders from both government and private sectors, and on interviews with key persons in the system.

== Leadership of the Commission ==
The COMSTE is currently chaired by Senator Edgardo Angara and co-chaired by Rep. Julio A. Ledesma IV from 1st District of Negros Occidental.

== 6 Panels of the COMSTE ==
COMSTE works in six sectors:

- Agriculture and Food
- Electronics and Semiconductors
- Energy and Environment
- Health Sciences
- IT and IT Enabled Industries
- Science, Math, and Engineering Education

=== Agriculture and Food Panel ===
Achieving competitiveness in Agriculture and Food has become imperative in the light of the Philippines development efforts. A significant part of the population is in the rural areas and they largely depend on agriculture, either for sustenance or for income. The agriculture sector is a major source of employment and labor. People who depend on agriculture often experience the worst levels of poverty. Any investment in agriculture and food will have significant and direct effects on economic development and poverty alleviation

=== Electronics and Semiconductors Panel ===
The country has received poor assessments of its public and private institutions (ranked 95th). The panel hopes to make this sector more competitive because it composes majority of its exports. With this goal, the panel is tackling issues such as the (1) declining standard of education, (2) electricity cost, (3) lack of university-industry interaction and, (4) taxes and incentives.

=== Energy and Environment Panel ===
As one of the six COMSTE panels tasked to spearhead the development of global competitiveness in Research and Development and Science and Technology, the Energy and Environment panel is at the forefront of addressing current issues weighing on the country. Focusing on medium and long-term solutions, the panel seeks to achieve a balanced system of providing clean, efficient and sustainable energy (a synthesis between existing fuel technologies and budding green technology) while also safeguarding diminishing natural resources.

=== Health Sciences Panel ===
An important and unanimous premise in this country is that health is a right, not a privilege. However, the current state of health in the Philippines is dreadful. At this position, the probability of meeting the Millennium Development Goals by 2015 is low. These goals include preventing hunger and halving the proportion of underweight children under five years old, followed by reducing maternal mortality ratio by 75%. Considering these, a panel of experts were constituted to discuss and think of solutions on problems regarding (1) Policies Governing the Practice of Health Professions and Health Care Delivery, (2) Health Human Resource Development, (3) Health Research and Development, (4) Financing of Health Care, and (5) Health Service Delivery.

=== IT and IT Enabled Industries Panel ===
The Philippines is one of the top 10 outsourcing and offshoring destinations in the world. The IT and IT-Enabled Industries Panel works to ensure the country's competitive positioning vis-à-vis other locations by attracting investments and customers. The Panel's experts believe that the IT industry must go up the value chain—attract higher-value projects, increase skills capacities, and undertake research and development. The government, too, must provide incentives to encourage this upward growth. These efforts, ultimately, work towards a culture and an environment, which prizes and rewards excellence.

=== Science, Math, and Engineering Education Panel ===
The basic role of science, mathematics and engineering education in advancing national competitiveness is to provide the human resources and the new knowledge to continually improve the productivity and, hence, competitiveness of the nation's firms. Any assessment of the SME education system should focus on how well it performs this role and on the reasons behind such level of performance.

== Technical Advisory Council (TAC) ==
The Technical Advisory Council (TAC) is a consultative committee within the COMSTE that supervise the panels and review their reports. The members of the TAC also serve as Senior Advisers to the members of the commission.
