= Amro River Protected Landscape =

- IUCN category V (protected landscape/seascape)
- Location within Philippines
- Location: Aurora, Philippines
- Nearest city: Santiago
- Coordinates: 16°20′13.86″N 122°05′59.49″E
- Area: 6,471.08 hectares (15,990.4 acres)
- Established: August 28, 1990 (Watershed forest reserve); April 23, 2000 (Protected landscape)
- Governing body: Department of Environment and Natural Resources

The Amro River Protected Landscape is a protected landscape area located in the province of Aurora in eastern Central Luzon in the Philippines. It preserves the primary water source for agricultural, power generation and domestic consumption of the remote northern Auroran communities on the Pacific coast. The area was first established in 1990 as the Amro River Watershed Forest Reserve to protect, maintain and improve the water yield of the Amro River as declared through Proclamation No. 633 by President Corazón Aquino. In 2000, the forest reserve was reclassified as a protected landscape under the National Integrated Protected Areas System with the enactment of Proclamation No. 274 by President Joseph Estrada. It is one of five declared protected areas of the Philippines in Aurora.

== Description ==
The Amro River Protected Landscape encompasses an area of 6,471.08 hectares (15,990.4 acres) in the northern Auroran municipalities of Casiguran and Dilasag. It extends along the Amro River from its headwaters near the irrigation dam built by the National Irrigation Administration (NIA) in the Sierra Madre mountain range to its foothills near the coast of Casiguran. The river is the third largest watershed area in Aurora after those of the Cabatangan–Malupa and Diteki rivers. It has a total drainage impact area of 7,190 hectares (17,800 acres) and empties into the Casiguran Bay.

The park is located in a forest-covered portion of the Sierra Madre with elevations of between 500 metres (1,600 ft) and 1,900 metres (6,200 ft) above sea level. It is about 9 kilometres (5.6 mi) north from the poblacion of Casiguran and some 100 kilometres (62 mi) from the provincial capital of Baler. A hydroelectric power plant project with a capacity of 3 megawatts was recently awarded to Alternergy Viento Partners Corp., a renewable energy company, and will be built along the river within the protected area.

== Wildlife ==
The park is known to be inhabited by a diverse wildlife species such as the water monitor, Philippine long-tailed macaque, Philippine deer, Philippine pygmy woodpecker, Philippine kingfisher and Brahminy kite. Its forest harbors an important flora consisting predominantly of dipterocarp tree species such as Shorea polysperma (tanguile), Shorea squamata (mayapis), Shorea contorta (white lauan), Shorea negrosensis (red lauan), Parashorea malaanonan (bagtikan), and Syzigium nitidum (makaasim).
