= Legislative districts of Aurora =

Legislative district of the Philippines

The legislative districts of Aurora are the representations of the province of Aurora in the various national legislatures of the Philippines. The province is currently represented in the lower house of the Congress of the Philippines through its lone congressional district.

== History ==
The area now under the jurisdiction of Aurora was represented as part of at-large district of Tayabas during the Malolos Congress (1898–1899) and National Assembly of the Second Philippine Republic (1942–1944) and the first district of Tayabas from 1907 to 1941 and from 1945 to 1972. When seats for the upper house of the Philippine Legislature were elected from territory-based districts between 1916 and 1935, the undivided province of Tayabas formed part of the fifth senatorial district which elected two out of the 24-member senate.

In the disruption caused by the Second World War, two delegates represented the province of Tayabas in the National Assembly of the Japanese-sponsored Second Philippine Republic: one was the provincial governor (an ex officio member), while the other was elected through a provincial assembly of KALIBAPI members during the Japanese occupation of the Philippines.

Upon the restoration of the Philippine Commonwealth in 1945, Tayabas continued to comprise two representative districts, with the territory of the current province of Aurora forming part of the first district. In 1946, Tayabas was renamed Quezon. 5 years later, on June 14, 1951, Republic Act No. 648 established the sub-province of Aurora within the province of Quezon.

Quezon (including the sub-province of Aurora) were represented in the Interim Batasang Pambansa as part of Region IV-A from 1978 to 1984. It was during this period that Aurora was proclaimed as a regular province, on August 13, 1979, by virtue of Batas Pambansa Blg. 7 enacted on November 21, 1978.

Aurora's first representative as a separate province was elected to the Regular Batasang Pambansa in 1984. The province was guaranteed its own congressional district under the new Constitution which was proclaimed on February 11, 1987, and elected its member to the restored House of Representatives starting that same year.

In 2019, the districts used in appropriation of members is coextensive with the legislative districts of Aurora. Prior to 2019, when the province was just one congressional district, the Commission on Elections divided the province into two provincial board districts.

== Senatorial representation ==
Between 1916 and 1935, the territory of what is now Aurora (then part of the province of Tayabas) was represented in the Senate of the Philippines through the 5th senatorial district of the Philippine Islands. However, in 1935, all senatorial districts were abolished when a unicameral National Assembly was installed under a new constitution following the passage of the Tydings–McDuffie Act, which established the Commonwealth of the Philippines. Since the 1941 elections, when the Senate was restored after a constitutional plebiscite, all twenty-four members of the upper house have been elected countrywide at-large.

== Congressional representation ==
Aurora has been represented in the lower house of various Philippine national legislatures since 1984, through its at-large congressional district.

Legislative Districts and Congressional Representatives of Aurora
District	Current Representative	Party	Population (2020)	Area
Lone	Rommel Rico Angara (since 2019); Baler	LDP	235,750	3,147.32 km^{2}

== Provincial board districts ==
The municipalities of Aurora are represented in the Aurora Provincial Board, the Sangguniang Panlalawigan (provincial legislature) of the province, through Aurora's first and second provincial board districts.

== Current districts and representatives ==
Political parties

LDP

Legislative districts and congressional representatives of Aurora
District	Current representative	Constituent LGUs	Population (2015)	Area
Lone	Rommel T. Angara (since 2019); Baler	List: Baler; Casiguran; Dilasag; Dinalungan; Dingalan; Dipaculao; Maria Aurora; San Luis	214,336	3,147.32 km^{2}
