= Edgardo Angara =

President of the Senate of the Philippines from 1993 to 1995

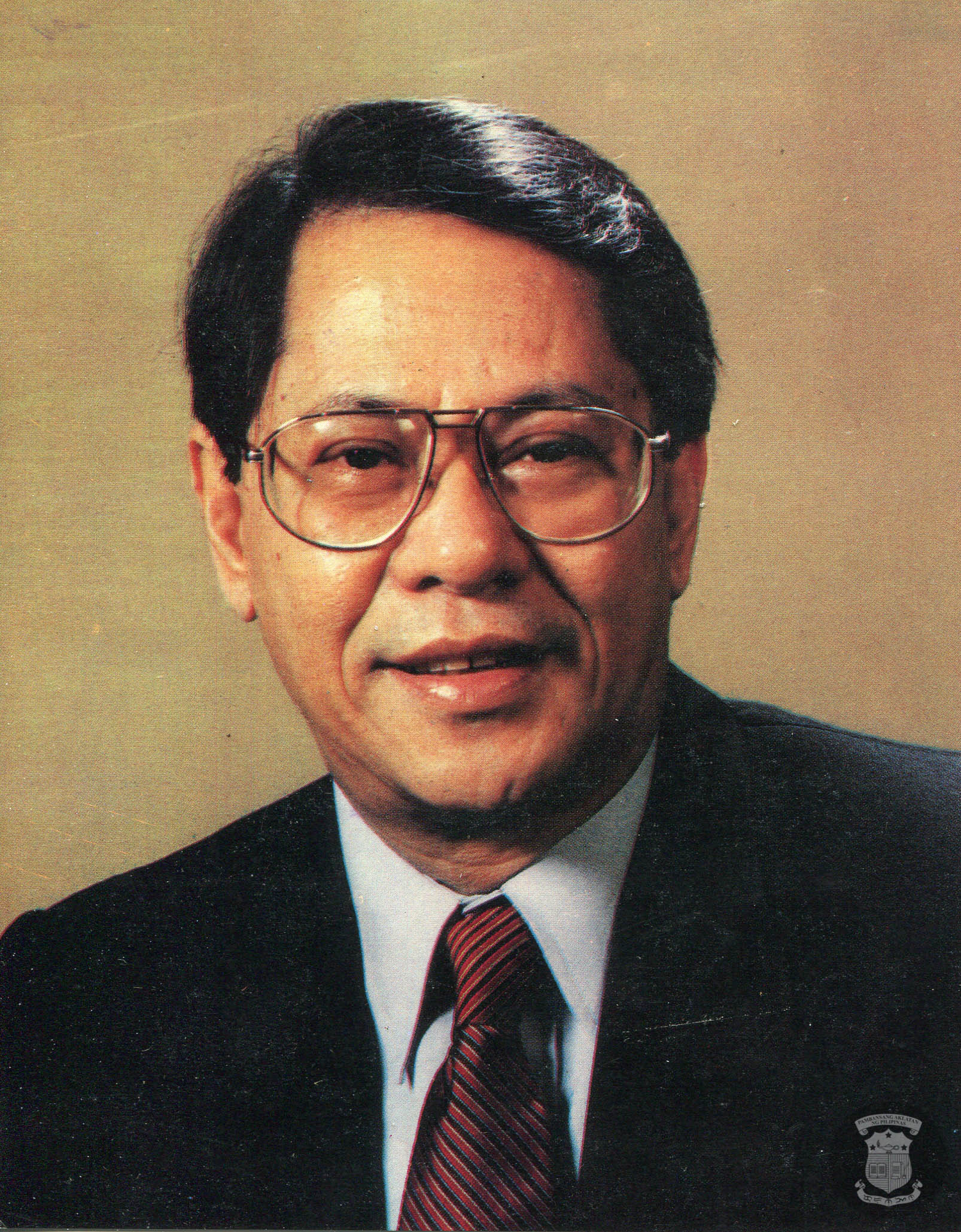
- Angara in 2000

16th President of the Senate of the Philippines
- In office January 18, 1993 – August 28, 1995
- Preceded by: Neptali Gonzales
- Succeeded by: Neptali Gonzales

Senator of the Philippines
- In office June 30, 2001 – June 30, 2013
- In office June 30, 1987 – June 30, 1998

32nd Executive Secretary of the Philippines
- In office January 6, 2001 – January 20, 2001
- President: Joseph Estrada
- Preceded by: Ronaldo Zamora
- Succeeded by: Renato de Villa

35th Secretary of Agriculture
- In office May 25, 1999 – January 6, 2001
- President: Joseph Estrada
- Preceded by: William Dar
- Succeeded by: Domingo F. Panganiban

Senate Minority Leader
- In office August 28, 1995 – October 10, 1996
- Preceded by: Wigberto Tañada
- Succeeded by: Neptali Gonzales

15th President of the University of the Philippines
- In office 1981–1987
- Preceded by: Emanuel V. Soriano
- Succeeded by: José Abueva

Personal details
- Born: Edgardo Javier Angara; September 24, 1934 Baler, Tayabas, Insular Government of the Philippine Islands (now Baler, Aurora, Philippines)
- Died: May 13, 2018 (aged 83) Tagaytay, Cavite, Philippines
- Party: LDP (1992–2018)
- Other political affiliations: Independent (1987–1992)
- Spouse: Gloria Manalang
- Children: Rosalyn "Anna" Angara; Juan Edgardo "Sonny" Angara; Alexandria "Alex" Angara-Cole; Katerina "Katya" Angara
- Education: University of the Philippines (LL.B); University of Michigan (LL.M)
- Profession: Lawyer

Edgardo Javier Angara (Tagalog pronunciation: [aŋˈɡara], September 24, 1934 – May 13, 2018) was a Filipino lawyer and politician who served as Senate President from 1993 to 1995. Angara had the second longest tenure in the history of the Senate, serving four terms and a total of twenty-three years. As a legislator, Angara has championed numerous important laws and bills including the free high school law, the Senior Citizen discount law, and many more.

In between his Senate stints, Angara also served as Secretary of Agriculture from 1999 to 2001 and also held other government positions briefly.

Outside politics, Angara served as the President of the University of the Philippines and also established himself as one of the most important figures in the bar when he was elected president of the Philippine Bar Association, the nation's oldest voluntary bar society. In 1975, he also served as president of the Integrated Bar of the Philippines (IBP), the country's unified association of lawyers.

His leadership was acknowledged even on a global scale. He was chosen to serve as the first president of the largest regional legal association in the world, the Association of Southeast Asian Countries (ASEAN) Law Association, when it was founded in 1980.

On May 17, 2017, President Rodrigo Duterte appointed Angara as the special envoy of the Philippines to the European Union.

== Early life and career ==
Edgardo Angara was born on September 24, 1934, in Baler, then part of the sub-province of Aurora in Tayabas (now Quezon), to Juan Angara and Juana Javier. He earned his law degree from the University of the Philippines in 1958. While in university, he joined the Sigma Rho fraternity. Upon graduation, he was elected to the Pi Gamma Mu and Phi Kappa Phi international honor societies. He earned his LL.M. from the University of Michigan Law School in 1964.

Angara was a delegate to the 1971 Constitutional Convention representing the first district of Quezon. In May 1972, he together with classmates (and fraternity brothers from Sigma Rho) from the UP College of Law and Juan Ponce Enrile, founded the ACCRA Law Offices, which became the country's most recognized and prestigious law firm in less than a decade. He became president of the Philippine Bar Association from 1975 to 1976, and of the Integrated Bar of the Philippines from 1979 to 1981. He also founded the ASEAN Law Association and became its founding president from 1980 to 1981.

From 1981 to 1987, Angara became president of the University of the Philippines. He rallied alumni in the country and abroad to pool their resources for various projects to mark the university's diamond jubilee in 1983, including the creation of additional professorial chairs and faculty grants. Through his efforts, the liberal arts curriculum was strengthened, a seven-year honors medical curriculum installed, humanities and science were energized, and a multi-campus university organization was instituted. He defended the state university's tradition of dissent and fiscal autonomy, while maintaining its reputation for academic excellence. He established stronger links with the business community and alumni organizations, raising the biggest faculty endowment in the university.

== Senator of the Philippines (1987−1998) ==
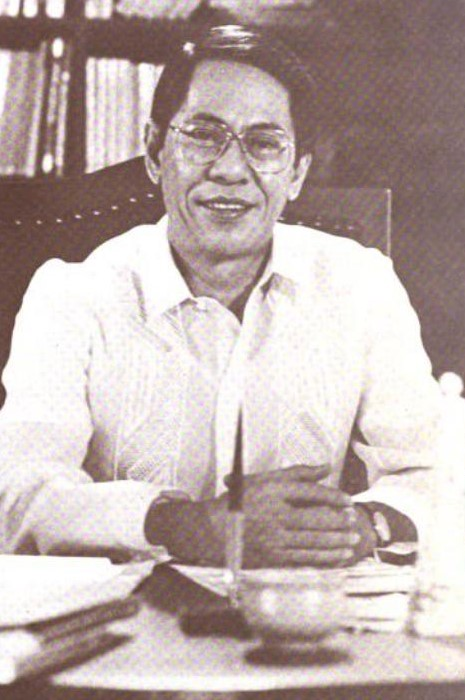
Angara as a senator, photograph released by the Philippine Congress, c. 1988

Angara's achievements brought him into politics. He first served as senator from 1987 until 1992. By this time, he had established a reputation as a resolute reformer and firm leader, winning praise for his non-confrontational stance on contentious domestic and international issues, while building consensus at the same time.

On September 16, 1989, Angara led a one-day forum with Alfonso J. Aguirre for the centennial of José Rizal's essay "Filipinas dentro de cien años" ("The Philippines, a Century Hence").

=== Senate Presidency (1993−1995) ===
He was Senate President from 1993 to 1995. As the Senate Chief, Angara, with his aggressive and consensus-building approach leadership style, rallied the upper chamber to pass bills and resolutions for an executive-legislative cooperation in economic reforms, which resulted in the Economic Summit of August 1993. It was likewise during his term that the Senate adopted a policy to reimpose the death penalty for heinous crimes and saw the ratification of the Earth Summit treaty, along with five pro-environment treaties, many of which have already been enacted into law.

In August 1995, he resigned from the Senate Presidency and was elected as the new Minority Leader of the Senate.

=== Educational and economic initiatives ===
As chairman of the Congressional Commission on Education from 1990 to 1991, Angara sponsored laws that resulted in the creation of the Commission on Higher Education and the Technical Education and Skill Development Authority, both of which enabled the Department of Education to focus on its main concern - basic education.

He authored the Free High School Act that ensured secondary education even for the poorest; the Senior Citizens Act (or The Angara Law) that allowed the elderly to avail of substantial discounts when buying medicine or riding public transport; the National Health Insurance Act, or PhilHealth, that provided insurance to every citizen; and the Government Assistance to Students and Teachers in Private Education (GASTPE), the biggest scholarship program.

Under his Agriculture and Fisheries Modernization Act (AFMA), farmers and fisher folk benefited from improved seeds and plant materials, better irrigation, better financing and market access.

He authored the Magna Carta for Public Health Workers and was the principal author of the laws that created the new National Museum and the National Commission on Culture and the Arts.

=== 1998 vice presidential bid ===
Angara prepared to run for president in the 1998 Philippine election, but decided against it when it became clear that he could not win over the popular vice president Joseph Estrada. He accepted a deal offered by Estrada to run as his vice presidential candidate instead. Although Estrada overwhelmingly won the presidential race, Angara placed second in a field of nine candidates, losing to Senator Gloria Macapagal Arroyo of Kabalikat ng Malayang Pilipino. Arroyo won 12.6 million votes compared to Angara's 5.6 million.

== Estrada administration (1998−2001) ==
=== Chairman of the Philippine National Bank (1998–1999) ===
Upon the inauguration of Estrada as president on June 30, 1998, Angara was named by him to be the chairman of the board of directors of the Philippine National Bank, then a government-owned bank. During his tenure, major policy reforms as well as innovations were introduced by him at the said bank.

=== Agriculture Secretary (1999−2001) ===
In 1999, Angara was appointed Secretary of Agriculture by Estrada. During his term as secretary (1999–2001), he had the opportunity to implement his own creation, AFMA. He oversaw an improvement of food production programs and support services that led to a bigger harvest of rice, a development that underscored the drive to attain food security. Overall, the agricultural sector saw a growth rate of 3.6 percent a year since 2000, compared with a 1.2 percent growth over the past two decades.

=== Executive Secretary (2001) ===
On January 6, 2001, as Estrada's presidency was crippled by an impeachment trial and widespread allegations of corruption, Angara was appointed Executive Secretary following the resignation of Ronaldo Zamora, who resigned to run for Congress. He only served for 14 days, as Estrada was toppled by the EDSA II Revolution on January 20. Angara remained loyal to Estrada until the end of his presidency, though he later asserted that his support for Estrada was contingent on the latter's undertaking to pass reforms.

== Return to the Senate (2001–2013) ==
Angara successfully ran for senator in the 2001 Philippine election.

He was re-elected to a fourth term in 2007, making him the longest-serving senator in the post-EDSA revolution legislature, matching Senator Lorenzo Tanada who served four consecutive terms from 1947 to 1972. Angara authored or sponsored many laws including the Free High School Education Act, the Government Assistance to Students and Teachers in Private Education or GASTPE Law, the Generics Act, the law which created Philhealth, the original Senior Citizens Act, Agricultural and Fisheries Modernization Act, Government Procurement Act, the Renewable Energy Act, among several others.

In 2007, Senator Edgardo Angara and Rep. Juan Edgardo Angara authored Republic Act No. 9490 which created the Aurora Special Economic Zone Authority (ASEZA), the body tasked to administer the economic zone in Brgy. Motiong, Casiguran, Aurora. Later on, Republic Act No. 10083 was enacted which amended the name to Aurora Pacific Economic Zone and Freeport Authority or better known as APECO. The APECO was created to generate jobs and livelihood not only for Aurora but its neighboring provinces. As a logistics hub, most consider it as a very timely and strategic infrastructure investment for the Philippines catering to Trans-Pacific Ocean traffic.

In the Senate, Angara chaired the Committee on Education, Arts and Culture, Committee on Science and Technology, and the Congressional Commission on Science and Technology and Engineering.

From January 16 to May 29, 2012, Angara acted as one of the Senator-Judges in the impeachment trial of the Senate of then Chief Justice Renato Corona and was one of the 20 Senator-Judges that voted to convict him of the impeachment charges exhibited by the House of Representatives and remove him from public office.

On October 3, 2012, he announced his candidacy for governor of Aurora in the 2013 Philippine election, but he withdrew and was replaced by his younger brother, Baler Mayor Arthur Angara.

On June 30, 2013, Angara's fourth term in the Senate ended but his son, Sonny placed a bid for Senator, he endorsed his son and campaigned with him with help from fellow senator Miriam Defensor Santiago, helping the younger Angara to be elected.

== Death ==
Edgardo Angara died from an apparent heart attack on May 13, 2018, at the age of 83. His death was announced by his son Sonny over his Twitter page. Angara's necrological services were conducted in the Senate halls on the morning of May 16. His former Senate colleagues such as Sen. Wigberto Tañada attended his funeral, while others such as Rene Saguisag, Pia Cayetano, Nene Pimentel, and former Presidents Gloria Macapagal Arroyo and Joseph Estrada, gave eulogies to Angara. President Rodrigo Duterte and Vice President Leni Robredo visited Angara's funeral in The Heritage Park in Taguig. His remains were buried in his hometown of Baler, Aurora.

== In popular culture ==
Senator Edgardo Angara's life was dramatized in the episode of ABS-CBN's drama anthology series, Maalaala Mo Kaya, titled "Family Portrait", originally aired on February 2, 2019. He was portrayed by Christopher de Leon, with younger versions portrayed by Raikko Mateo and James Blanco.

== Electoral history ==
Electoral history of Edgardo Angara
Year	Office	Party	Votes received				Result
Year	Office	Party	Total	%	P.	Swing	Result
1987	Senator of the Philippines	Independent	11,288,407	49.64%	5th	—N/a	Won
1992	Senator of the Philippines	LDP	8,019,011	33.06%	3rd	-16.58	Won
2001	Senator of the Philippines	LDP	10,805,177	36.66%	9th	+3.60	Won
2007	Senator of the Philippines	LDP	12,657,769	42.91%	7th	+6.25	Won
1998	Vice President of the Philippines	LDP	5,652,068	22.11%	2nd	—N/a	Lost

Academic offices
Preceded by Emmanuel V. Soriano	President of the University of the Philippines; 1981–1987	Succeeded by José Abueva
Senate of the Philippines
Preceded by Neptali Gonzales	President of the Senate; 1993–1995	Succeeded by Neptali Gonzales
Preceded by Wigberto Tañada	Minority Floor Leader; 1995–1996	Succeeded by Neptali Gonzales
Political offices
Preceded by William Dar	Secretary of Agriculture; 1999–2001	Succeeded by Domingo F. Panganiban
Preceded by Ronaldo Zamora	Executive Secretary; 2001	Succeeded by Renato de Villa
Party political offices
Preceded by Marcelo Fernan	LDP nominee for Vice President of the Philippines; 1998	Most recent
