= Sonny Angara =

Filipino politician (born 1972)

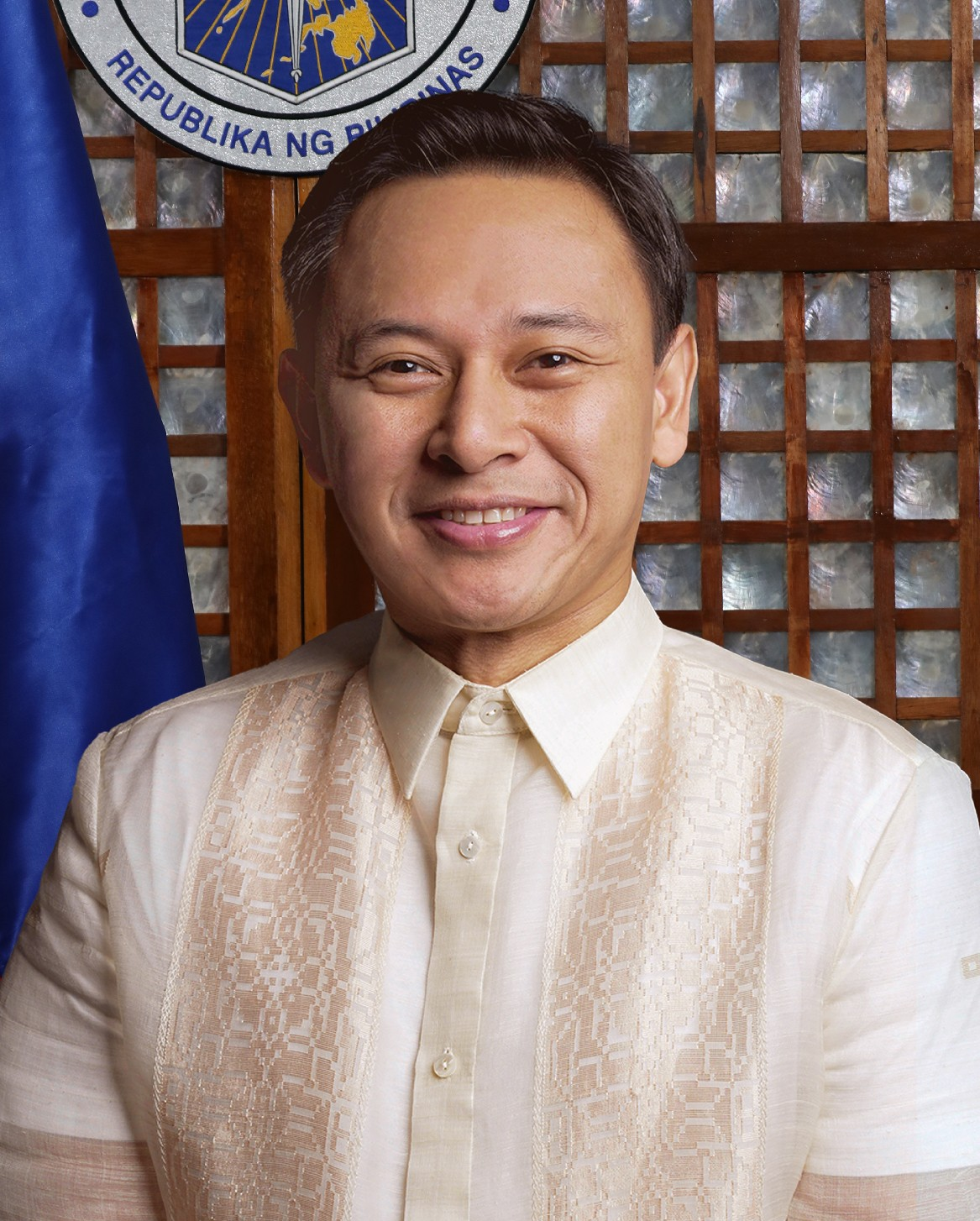
- Official portrait, 2025

54th Secretary of Education
- Incumbent
- Assumed office July 19, 2024
- President: Bongbong Marcos
- Preceded by: Sara Duterte

President of the Southeast Asian Ministers of Education Organization
- Incumbent
- Assumed office July 19, 2024
- Vice President: Romaizah Salleh
- Preceded by: Sara Duterte

Senator of the Philippines
- In office June 30, 2013 – July 18, 2024 (Note: Original term until June 30, 2025; resigned to sit as education secretary.)
Senate committee positions
Chair of the Senate Justice and Human Rights Committee
In office May 22, 2024 – July 18, 2024
| Preceded by | Francis Tolentino |
| Succeeded by | Koko Pimentel |
Chair of the Senate Youth Committee
In office July 24, 2019 – May 20, 2024
| Preceded by | Joel Villanueva |
| Succeeded by | Bong Go |
Chair of the Senate Finance Committee
In office July 23, 2019 – May 20, 2024
| Preceded by | Loren Legarda |
| Succeeded by | Grace Poe |

Chairman of the Samahang Basketbol ng Pilipinas
- Incumbent
- Assumed office August 8, 2016
- Preceded by: Oscar Moreno

Member of the Philippine House of Representatives from Aurora's at-large district
- In office June 30, 2004 – June 30, 2013
- Preceded by: Bellaflor Angara-Castillo
- Succeeded by: Bellaflor Angara-Castillo

Personal details
- Born: Juan Edgardo Manalang Angara; July 15, 1972 (age 54) Manila, Philippines
- Party: LDP (2004–present)
- Spouse: Tootsy Echauz (m. 2003)
- Relations: Arthur Angara (uncle); Bellaflor Angara-Castillo (aunt); Rommel T. Angara (cousin)
- Children: 3
- Parent(s): Edgardo Angara; Gloria Manalang
- Education: London School of Economics and Political Science (BS); University of the Philippines Diliman (LL.B); Harvard University (LL.M)
- Occupation: Politician; columnist; lecturer
- Profession: Lawyer
- Website: alagangangara.com

Juan Edgardo "Sonny" Manalang Angara (Tagalog: [aŋˈɡara]; born July 15, 1972) is a Filipino lawyer and politician who has served as the 54th secretary of education since 2024. He has concurrently served as chairman of the Samahang Basketbol ng Pilipinas since 2016 and as the president of the Laban ng Demokratikong Pilipino since 2018.

A graduate of the London School of Economics and the University of the Philippines College of Law, Angara entered politics in 2004 after being elected as the representative of Aurora's at-large district, a seat he would hold until 2013. During his tenure, he supported the impeachment of Renato Corona and acted deputy spokesperson of the House prosecution panel. Angara was elected to the Senate of the Philippines in 2013 and served until 2024 before resigning to become the secretary of education.

== Early life and education ==
Angara was born on July 15, 1972, in Manila to lawyer and former Senate President Edgardo Angara and Gloria Manalang-Angara, a teacher who would become chairperson of the Cultural Center of the Philippines. He took up his basic education at Xavier School in San Juan, Metro Manila, then attended Douai School in the UK, and finished his Bachelor of Science degree in International Relations with honors from the London School of Economics in 1994. He finished his law degree at the University of the Philippines College of Law in 2000 and earned his Master of Laws degree from Harvard Law School in Cambridge, Massachusetts in 2003.

== Early career ==
Angara worked as a trainee at the Metropolitan Bank and Trust Company (Metrobank) in Makati in 1991. He worked as a news reporter for The Philippine Star in 1992. He served as an apprentice and member of the delegation in the Philippine Mission to the United Nations in New York in 1994. He worked as an associate attorney at the Angara Abello Concepcion Regala and Cruz (ACCRA) law firm from 2001 to 2003. He taught as a professor at the New Era University (NEU) College of Law and at the Centro Escolar University (CEU) School of Law and Jurisprudence.

== House of Representatives (2004–2013) ==
Angara was first elected to public office in 2004 as the representative to Congress for the lone district of Aurora, where he succeeded his aunt, Bellaflor J. Angara-Castillo, a three-term representative and erstwhile governor of Aurora. He was elected to a second term as congressman in 2007, when he ran unopposed under the Laban ng Demokratikong Pilipino (LDP), the same political party as in 2004. Angara was elected to a third term as congressman for Aurora in 2010.

=== Tenure ===
==== First term (2004–2007) ====
Elected at age 31, he was one of the youngest members of the 13th Congress. He was a member of the House minority and served as House deputy minority leader, thereby becoming an ex officio member of all standing and special committees of the 13th Congress.

He authored a number of laws of national significance and was able to focus on work in his constituency, where he used the funds allotted to his office to build over 100 classrooms and provided funds for indigent constituents in 12 government hospitals and hundreds of scholarships to deserving students at various state universities and colleges (SUCs). He also worked together with socio-civic groups on various projects and funded the creation of the Gawad Kalinga villages for the homeless in three of Aurora's municipalities and the provision of computers and Internet access to Aurora's public high schools, together with the GILAS Foundation, and access to vocational, skills, and livelihood training through the Technical Education and Skills Development Authority (TESDA) and other groups.

==== Second term (2007–2010) ====
He served as deputy majority leader and vice chairman of the committee on rules, also as an ex officio member of all standing and special committees in the House during the 14th Congress (2007–2010). as the representative of Aurora's at-large district He was one of the remaining congressmen who offered aid to some of the wounded persons and personally took some of the survivors to the nearby Far Eastern University - Nicanor Reyes Medical Foundation in Quezon City for treatment when a bomb was planted at the premises of the House of Representatives in 2008 which resulted in the death of Representative Wahab Akbar and the death and serious wounding of other congressmen and congressional staffers. He topped the list of "prolific and hardworking members of the House of Representatives" for filing the most number of bills of national importance that were enacted into law in the 14th Congress.

A report by the House Indexing and Monitoring Group of the Bills and Index Department showed that in the 14th Congress of 2007–2010, he, then deputy majority floor leader, filed 10 national bills that eventually became laws of the land.

==== Third term (2010–2013) ====
He was a signatory to the impeachment complaint against then-Chief Justice Renato Corona, which was signed by the 188 members of the Philippine House of Representatives in December 2011, was eventually adopted as the Articles of Impeachment, and was passed for consideration of the Senate impeachment court. He acted as deputy spokesperson of the House prosecution panel, together with Marikina Representative Miro Quimbo and Quezon Representative Lorenzo Tañada III, in the impeachment trial of the Chief Justice.

== Senate (2013–2024) ==
=== Elections ===
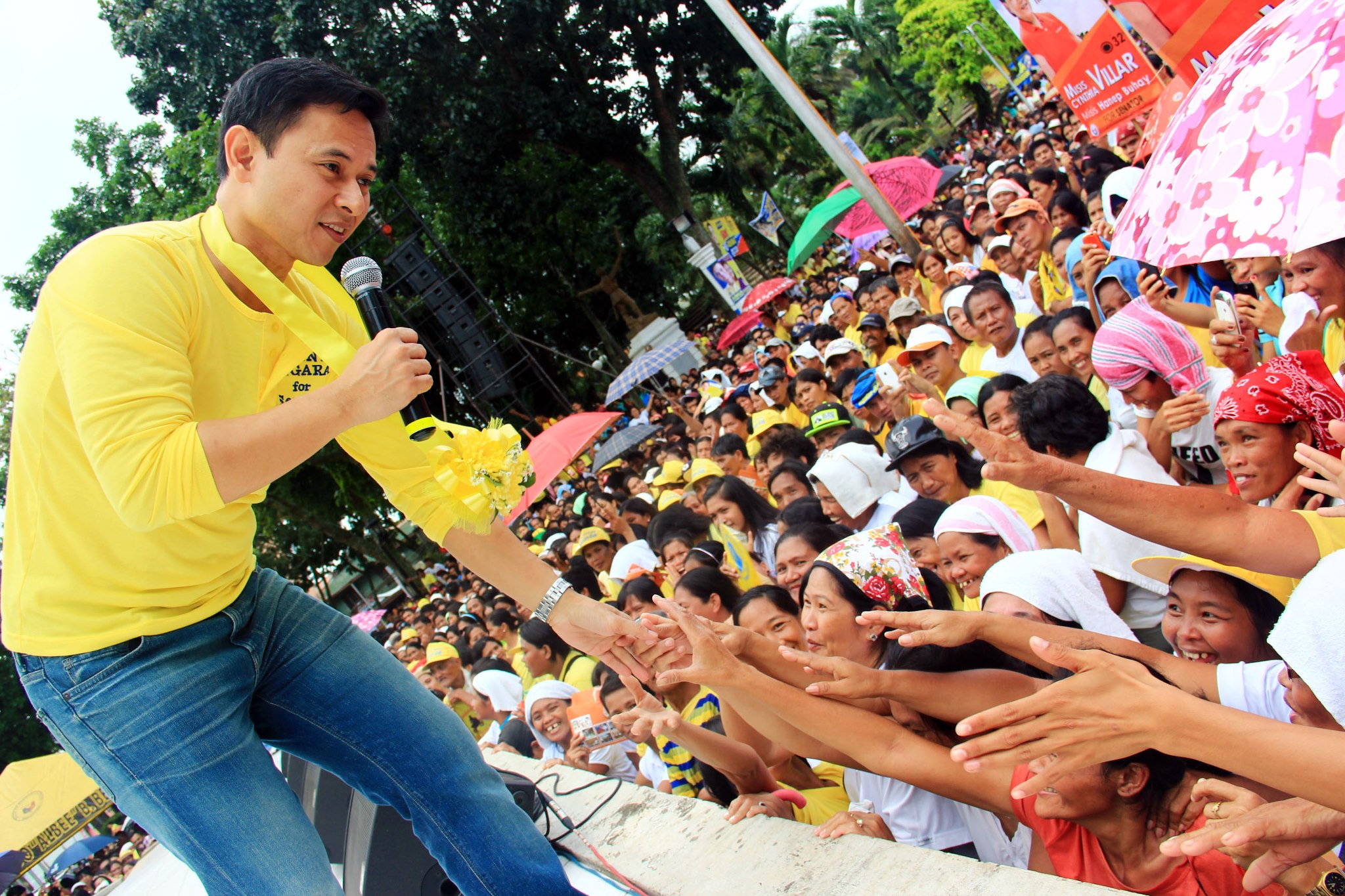
Angara campaigning for senator in 2013.

Angara was elected to the Senate in 2013 and was reelected in 2019. He ran under the then-administration coalitions Team PNoy and Hugpong ng Pagbabago, respectively.

=== Tenure ===
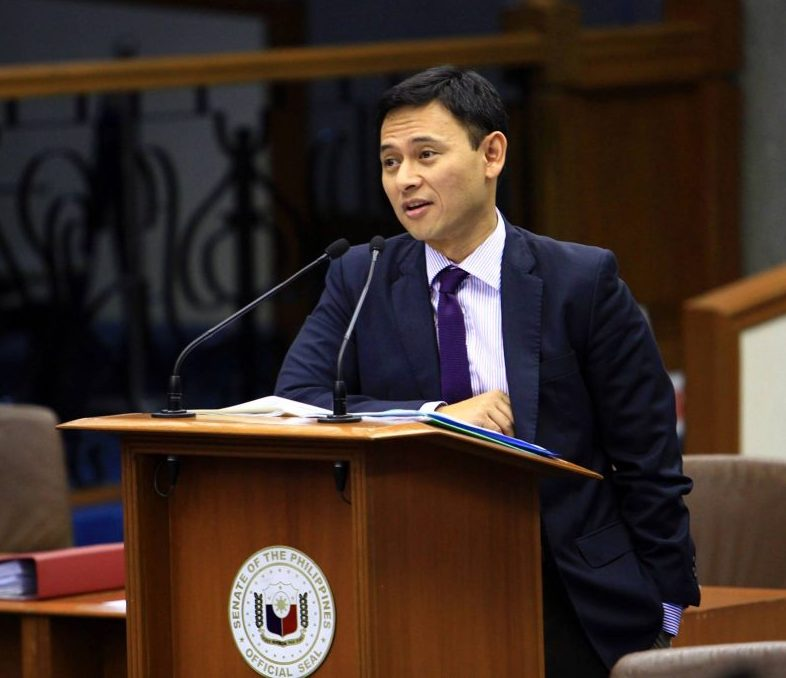
Angara delivering a privilege speech during the 17th Congress in May 2017.

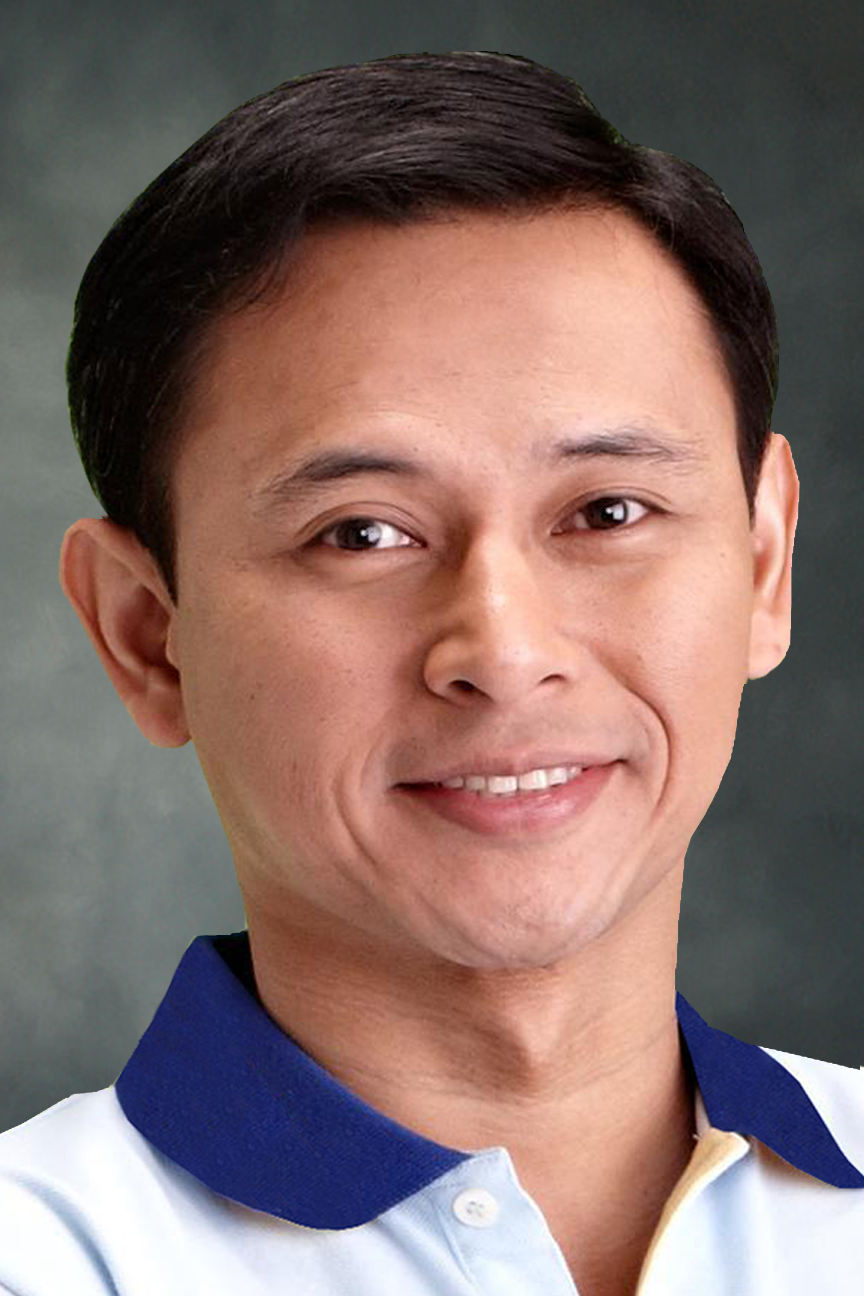
Official portrait, 2019

In the 16th Congress, Angara chaired the Committee on Games, Amusement and Sports. In this capacity, Angara pushed for legislation increasing the amount of financial incentives and benefits given to national athletes, coaches and recognition of athletes with disabilities as national athletes and establishing sports academies and training centers. In 2014, he sought Filipino citizenship for Andray Blatche to make him eligible for the Gilas Pilipinas national basketball team.

Angara acted as chairman of the Senate Committee on Labor, Employment and Human Resources. He sponsored RA 10691 or the amended Public Employment Service Office (PESO) Act, which aims to improve and strengthen PESOs' employment facilitation services to help more Filipinos land a job especially in rural areas and poorer municipalities, and RA 10706 or the Seafarers Protection Act, which protects Filipino seafarers from ambulance chasers, particularly lawyers, who charge excessive legal fees arising from accident, illness, or death of seafarers in the course of their service.

In 2016, Angara became the chairman of Samahang Basketbol ng Pilipinas, the governing body of basketball in the Philippines. In 2018, he assumed the presidency of the LDP.

In the 18th Congress, Angara chaired the Senate's Finance and Youth committees. As chairman of the Committee of Finance, he sponsored law measures instrumental in the government's COVID-19 pandemic response and recovery. He also chaired the Senate Ways and Means Committee, where he promoted the passage of the Tax Incentives Management and Transparency Act (TIMTA) and legislation exempting persons with disabilities (PWDs) from the 12-percent value added tax (VAT) on various areas. He also pushed for the increase in the excise tax on tobacco products to help fund the gap for the Universal Health Care Act.

In May 2024, Angara was among the six senators who voted to retain Juan Miguel Zubiri as Senate President. Zubiri was eventually ousted with 15 senators voting against him and replaced by Francis Escudero. The seven senators who did not vote for Escudero were collectively called "Magic 7," as they were also seatmates in the session hall. On May 22, Angara was named as the new chairman of the Senate Committee on Justice and Human Rights.

== Secretary of Education (since 2024) ==
=== Appointment ===
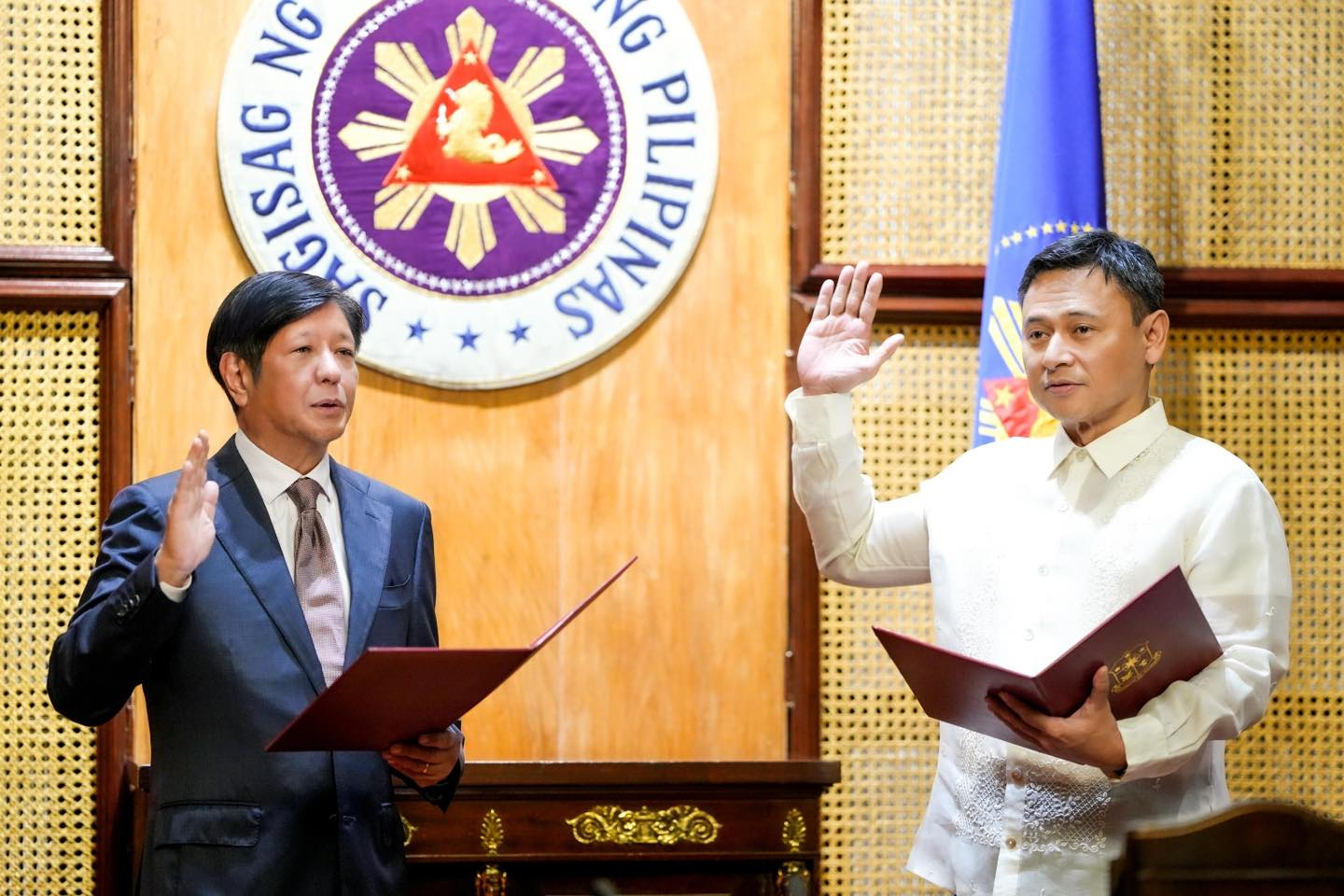
Angara taking the oath as Secretary of Education before President Bongbong Marcos on Malacañan Palace, July 19, 2024

On July 2, 2024, President Bongbong Marcos announced the appointment of Angara as secretary of education. He succeeded Vice President Sara Duterte, who resigned from the post on June 19, 2024, amid a rift with the president.

=== Early tenure ===
Angara formally took oath as secretary on July 19, following a ceremonial turnover the day before. Upon taking office, Angara resigned from his seat in the Senate, which remained vacant until June 30, 2025. The Commission on Appointments later approved his appointment on August 7 with minimal discourse.

In July 2024, Angara instructed his department to simplify teachers' performance review. On May 22, 2025, Angara tendered his courtesy resignation as secretary, following a directive from President Marcos calling for a cabinet-wide resignation. President Marcos rejected his resignation on June 3, retaining him in the position.

== Personal life ==
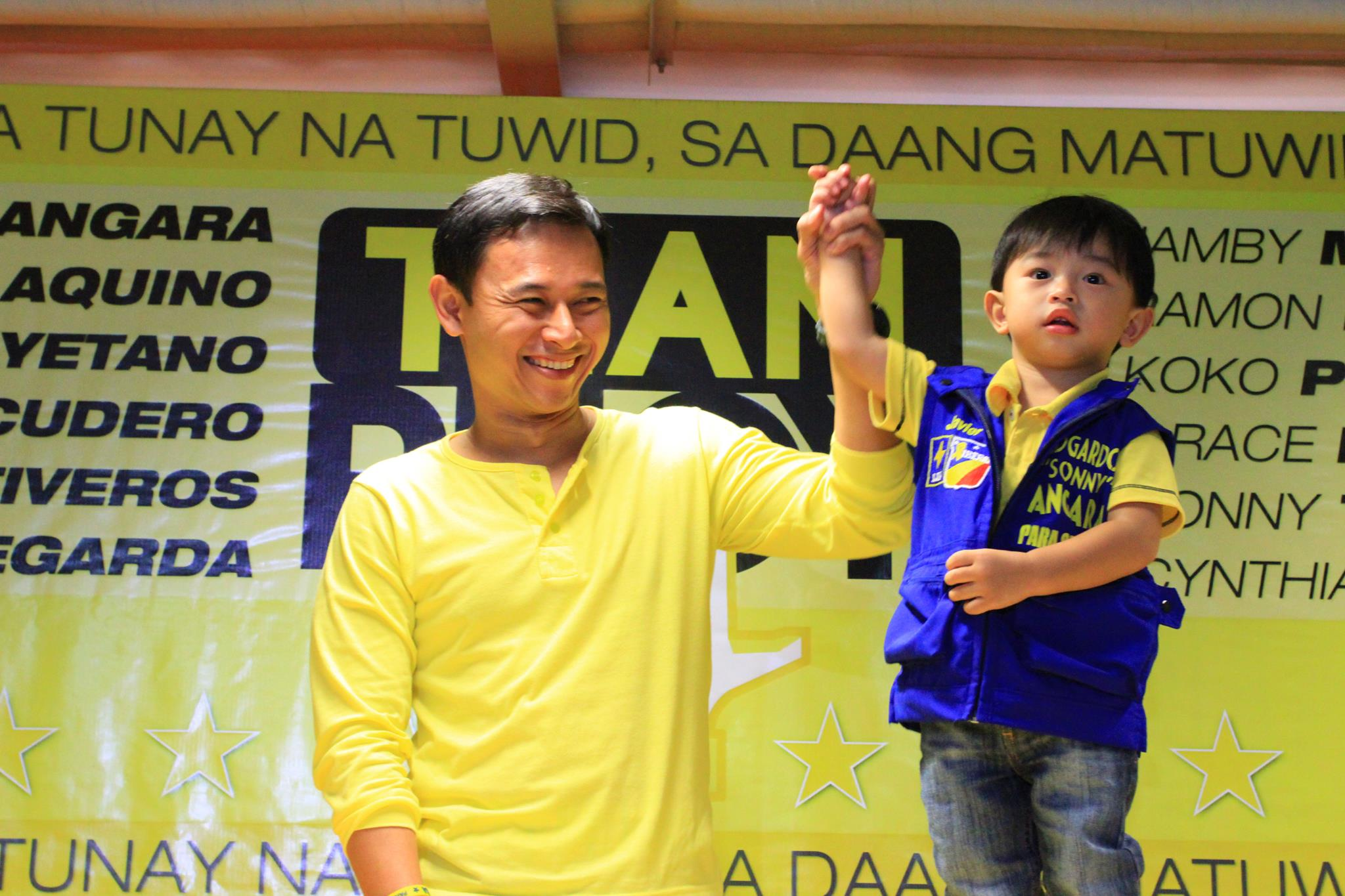
Angara and his son in May 2013

Angara married ABS-CBN executive Tootsy Echauz in 2003; they have three children.

Angara is a Freemason and Grand Orator of the Pangarap Masonic Lodge No. 448.

On March 26, 2020, he tested positive for COVID-19. Angara was one of the first four highest-ranking government officials to have been infected with the SARS-CoV2 including Senators Migz Zubiri and Koko Pimentel, and AFP Chief of Staff General Felimon Santos Jr.. He then recovered from the disease. On May 2, 2020, Angara tested positive for COVID-19 again but has since recovered as well.

== Electoral history ==
Electoral history of Sonny Angara
| Year | Office | Party | Votes received | | | | Result |
| Year | Office | Party | Total | % | P. | Swing | Result |
|---|---|---|---|---|---|---|---|
| 2004 | Representative (Aurora–at-large) | LDP | 48,664 | 72.06% | 1st | —N/a | Won |
| 2007 | Representative (Aurora–at-large) | LDP | —N/a | 100.00% | 1st | +27.94 | Unopposed |
| 2010 | Representative (Aurora–at-large) | LDP | 60,440 | 80.63% | 1st | -19.37 | Won |
| 2013 | Senator of the Philippines | LDP | 16,005,564 | 39.87% | 6th | —N/a | Won |
| 2019 | Senator of the Philippines | LDP | 18,161,862 | 38.40% | 6th | -1.47 | Won |

== Awards ==
Angara was one of the Ten Outstanding Young Men (TOYM) of the Philippines awardees for 2010. He received his trophy from President Benigno Aquino III in a ceremony held at the Rizal Hall of the Malacañang Palace. He was also a recipient of the Tanglaw ng Bayan 2011 award, the highest award given by the Polytechnic University of the Philippines (PUP) in Manila to individuals with exemplary achievements in their respective fields. He was conferred honorary doctorate in law (honoris causa) by the Ramon Magsaysay Technological University (RMTU) in Iba, Zambales, in November 2011. He was one of nine recipients of the Outstanding Manilan Award in 2017.

== Notes ==
House of Representatives of the Philippines
| Preceded by Bellaflor J. Angara-Castillo | Representative, Lone District of Aurora; 2004–2013 | Succeeded by Bellaflor J. Angara-Castillo |
Sporting positions
| Preceded by Oscar Moreno | Chairperson of the Samahang Basketbol ng Pilipinas; 2016–present | Incumbent |
Senate of the Philippines
| Preceded by Loren Legarda | Chair of the Philippine Senate Finance Committee; 2019–2024 | Succeeded by Grace Poe |
| Preceded by Joel Villanueva | Chair of the Philippine Senate Youth Committee; 2019–2024 | Succeeded by Bong Go |
| Preceded by Francis Tolentino | Chair of the Philippine Senate Justice and Human Rights Committee; 2024 | Succeeded by Koko Pimentel |
Government offices
| Preceded by Sara Duterte | Secretary of Education; 2024–present | Incumbent |
Positions in intergovernmental organisations
| Preceded by Sara Duterte | President of the Southeast Asian Ministers of Education Organization; 2024–present | Incumbent |
Party political offices
| Preceded by Edgardo Angara | Chairman of Laban ng Demokratikong Pilipino; 2018–present | Incumbent |
Order of precedence
| Preceded by Giovanni Z. Lopez as Secretary of Public Works and Highways | Order of Precedence of the Philippines as Secretary of Education | Succeeded by Francis Tolentino as Secretary of Labor and Employment |
