= Aurora Pacific Economic Zone and Freeport =

Coordinates: 16°11′53″N 122°03′58″E

The Aurora Pacific Economic Zone and Freeport, also known as APECO, was established by virtue of Republic Act No. 9490, otherwise known as the Aurora Special Economic Zone Act of 2007. It is being supervised and managed by the Aurora Pacific Economic Zone and Freeport Authority into a self-sustaining industrial, commercial, financial, and recreational center, with a suitable residential area, in order to create employment opportunities around Casiguran, Aurora, and to effectively encourage and attract legitimate and productive local and foreign investments. Anti-APECO advocates, which include farmers, fishers, and indigenous peoples, have cited issues of land grabbing as well as misspending and poor financial management.

== Location ==
APECO is located in the municipality of Casiguran in the province of Aurora, a coastal town in the eastern seaboard of the island of Luzon in the Philippines. Aurora is enveloped within the provinces of Isabela, Quirino, and Nueva Ecija. It is esteemed as the only economic zone facing the Pacific Ocean, an ideal starting point for the inflow of commerce in the northeastern quadrangle of Luzon. Aurora Province is a 328-kilometer land area facing the Pacific Ocean ornamented with natural wonders. The ecozone was purposely situated in the bay area of Casiguran, a naturally protected enclave cradled by the Sierra Madre mountain range and the 12,000-hectare San Ildefonso Peninsula. Casiguran and Baler, the latter being the capital of Aurora, are among the oldest municipalities of Aurora with a combined population of about 53,000. Fishing and farming are considered the major industries of the province.

Indigenous peoples from Casiguran are claiming around 11,500 hectares of APECO land as part of their ancestral domain.

== Land area and infrastructure development ==
APECO has a total of 496 hectares in the mainland of Casiguran and an additional 12,000 hectares in the San Ildefonso Peninsula. Because of its pristine location and natural beauty, this special ecozone is being promoted as an eco-friendly and tourism ecozone.

At present, APECO is undertaking Phase One development consisting of 25 hectares that includes the construction of a 3-star hotel and the administration building. The second phase will involve the construction of an infirmary building and other infrastructure facilities like telecommunications and BPO facilities.

== Dumagat opposition ==
APECO was allegedly approved without consulting local tribal groups, particularly the Dumagat indigenous group, who have been in the area since the 1900s, subsisting on hunting, gathering and fishing. They are opposed to the development of APECO, and are asking the Supreme Court to cancel the project. Their protests and concerns are the subject of the 2014 documentary "The March to Progress in the Philippines" by Ditsi Carolino.

The non-governmental organization Task Force Anti-APECO (TFAA) has alleged that APECO has been converting agricultural lands without the required approval from the Department of Agrarian Reform and that no consultations were held with local government units and indigenous peoples in violation of the Indigenous People's Rights Act.

== See also ==
- Subic Bay Freeport Zone (formerly U.S. Naval Base Subic Bay)
- Cagayan Special Economic Zone
