= Aurora's at-large congressional district =

House of Representatives of the Philippines legislative district

- Constituency for the House of Representatives of the Philippines
- Location of Aurora within the Philippines
- Province: Aurora
- Region: Central Luzon
- Population: 235,750 (2020)
- Electorate: 154,688 (2022)
- Area: 3,147.32 km^{2} (1,215.19 sq mi)

Current constituency
- Created: 1984
- Representative: Rommel Angara
- Created from: Quezon-1
- Political party: LDP
- Congressional bloc: Majority

Aurora's at-large congressional district is the sole congressional district of the Philippines in the province of Aurora. It has been represented in the House of Representatives since 1987 and earlier in the Batasang Pambansa from 1984 to 1986. Aurora first elected a single representative provincewide at-large for the Regular Batasang Pambansa following its creation as a regular province separate from Quezon in 1978 and the subsequent 1984 Philippine constitutional plebiscite that amended the 1973 constitution and abolished the regional at-large assembly districts. Before 1978, the province was represented in the national legislatures as part of Quezon's (formerly Tayabas) 1st and at-large congressional districts. The district was re-created on February 2, 1987 following the ratification of the 1987 constitution that restored the House of Representatives. It is currently represented in the 20th Congress by Rommel Angara of the Laban ng Demokratikong Pilipino (LDP).

== Representation history ==
#	Image	Member	Term of office		Batasang Pambansa	Party	Electoral history
#	Image	Member	Start	End	Batasang Pambansa	Party	Electoral history
=== Aurora's at-large district for the Regular Batasang Pambansa ===
District created February 1, 1984 from Region IV-A's at-large district.
1		Luis S. Etcubañez	July 23, 1984	March 25, 1986	2nd	KBL	Elected in 1984.
#	Image	Member	Term of office		Congress	Party	Electoral history
#	Image	Member	Start	End	Congress	Party	Electoral history
=== Aurora's at-large district for the House of Representatives of the Philippines ===
District re-created February 2, 1987.
2		Benedicto G. Miran	June 30, 1987	June 30, 1995	8th	UNIDO	Elected in 1987.
2		Benedicto G. Miran	June 30, 1987	June 30, 1995	9th	LDP	Re-elected in 1992.
2		Benedicto G. Miran	June 30, 1987	June 30, 1995	9th	Lakas	Re-elected in 1992.
3		Bellaflor Angara-Castillo	June 30, 1995	June 30, 2004	10th	Lakas	Elected in 1995.
3		Bellaflor Angara-Castillo	June 30, 1995	June 30, 2004	11th	LAMMP	Re-elected in 1998.
3		Bellaflor Angara-Castillo	June 30, 1995	June 30, 2004	12th	LDP	Re-elected in 2001.
4		Sonny Angara	June 30, 2004	June 30, 2013	13th	LDP	Elected in 2004.
4		Sonny Angara	June 30, 2004	June 30, 2013	14th	LDP	Re-elected in 2007.
4		Sonny Angara	June 30, 2004	June 30, 2013	15th	LDP	Re-elected in 2010.
(3)		Bellaflor Angara-Castillo	June 30, 2013	June 30, 2019	16th	LDP	Elected in 2013.
(3)		Bellaflor Angara-Castillo	June 30, 2013	June 30, 2019	17th	LDP	Re-elected in 2016.
5		Rommel Angara	June 30, 2019	Incumbent	18th	LDP	Elected in 2019.
5		Rommel Angara	June 30, 2019	Incumbent	19th	LDP	Re-elected in 2022.
5		Rommel Angara	June 30, 2019	Incumbent	20th	LDP	Re-elected in 2025.

== Election results ==
=== 2025 ===
2025 Philippine House of Representatives elections
Party	Candidate	Votes	%
LDP	Rommel Rico Angara	102,222	100.00
Total votes		102,222	100.00
LDP hold			

=== 2022 ===
2022 Philippine House of Representatives elections
Party	Candidate	Votes	%
LDP	Rommel Rico Angara	102,459	100.00
Total votes		102,459	100.00
LDP hold			

=== 2019 ===
2019 Philippine House of Representatives elections
Party	Candidate	Votes	%
LDP	Rommel Rico Angara	63,542	63.39
Independent	Narciso Amansec	36,700	36.61
Total votes		100,242	100.00
LDP hold			

=== 2016 ===
2016 Philippine House of Representatives elections
Party	Candidate	Votes	%
LDP	Bella Angara-Castillo	48,868	50.39
Nacionalista	Annabelle Tangson	48,114	49.61
Total votes		96,982	100.00
LDP hold			

== See also ==
- Legislative district of Aurora
