= Casiguran, Aurora =

Municipality in Aurora, Philippines

Casiguran
- Municipality
- Municipality of Casiguran
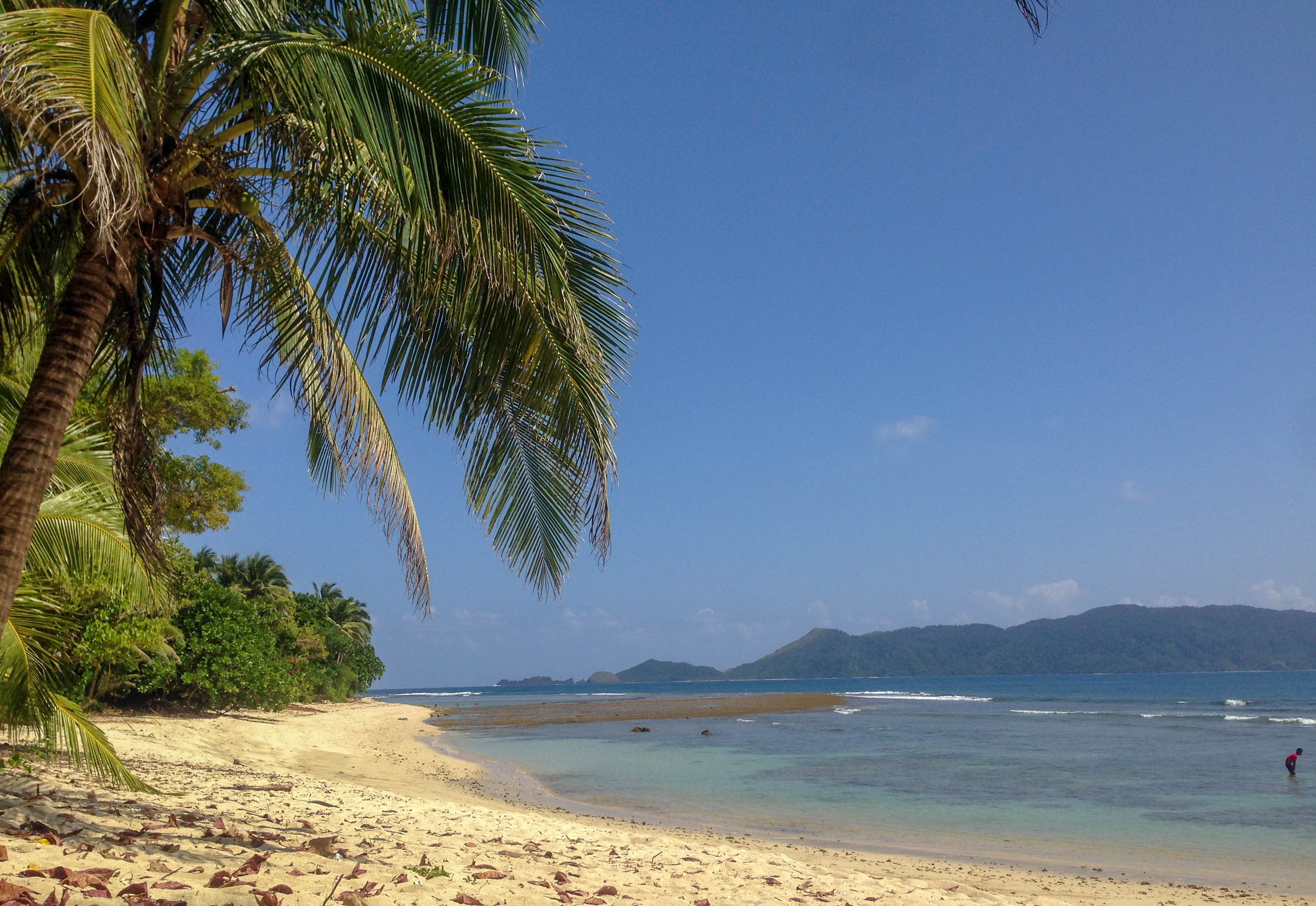
- Casapsapan Beach

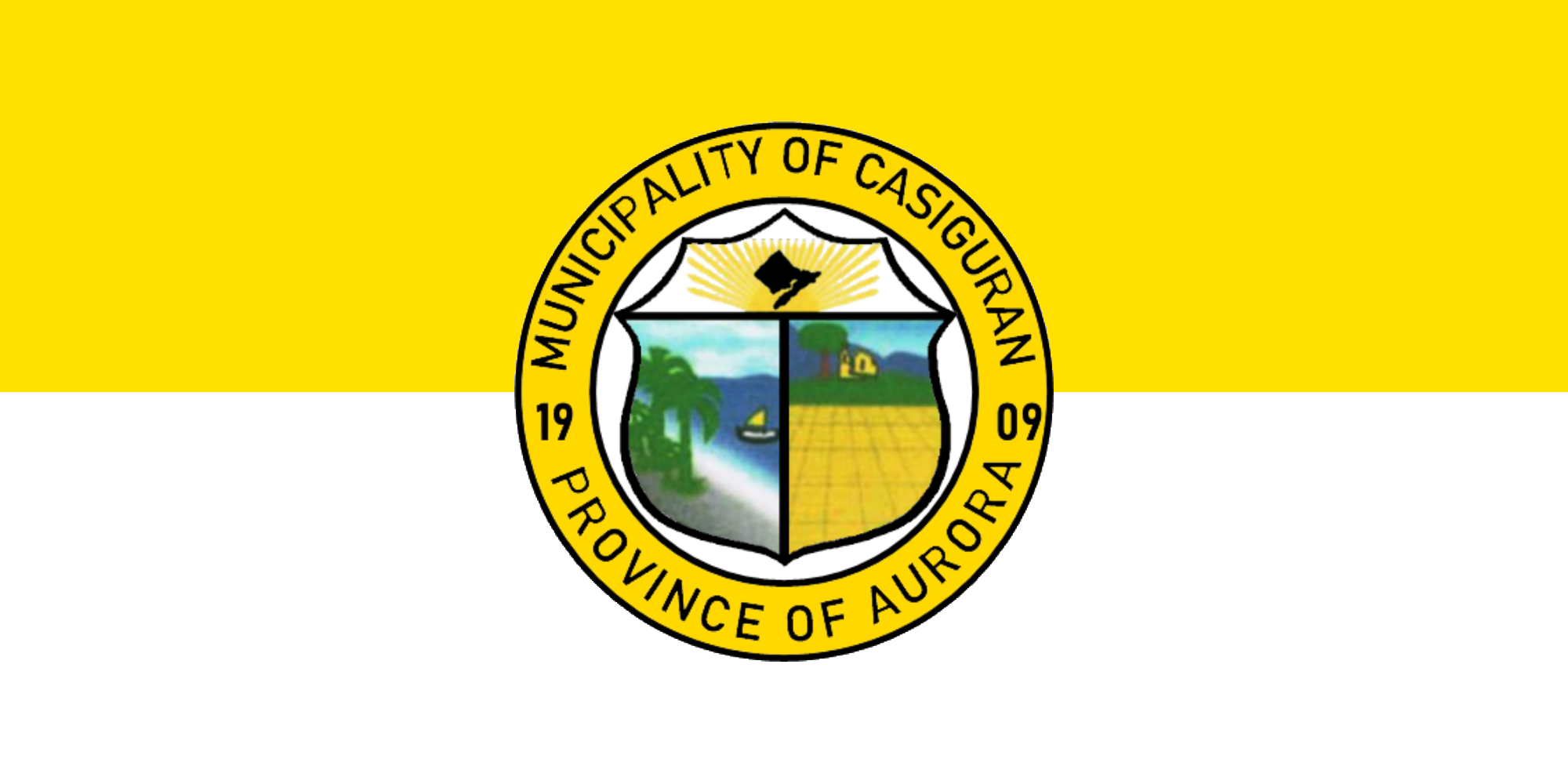
- Flag Seal

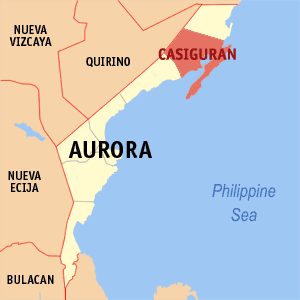
- Map of Aurora with Casiguran highlighted
- Interactive map of Casiguran
- Location within the Philippines
- Coordinates: 16°17′N 122°07′E
- Country: Philippines
- Region: Central Luzon
- Province: Aurora
- District: Lone district
- Founded: June 13, 1609
- Annexation to Baler: October 24, 1906
- Chartered: September 20, 1907
- Barangays: 24 (see Barangays)

Government
  - Type: Sangguniang Bayan
  - Mayor: Roynald S. Soriano
  - Vice Mayor: Eugene Calugtong
  - Representative: Rommel Rico T. Angara
  - Municipal Council: Members: Mara S. Cayetano; Alfredo A. Adarayan Jr.; Antonio B. Curitana; Edna B. Corbadura; Ryan Gil P. Valin; Joel V. Torre; Bernardo A. Marzan; Eduardo S. Balbuena
  - Electorate: 17,768 voters (2025)

Area
  - Total: 715.43 km^{2} (276.23 sq mi)
- Elevation: 74 m (243 ft)
- Highest elevation: 461 m (1,512 ft)
- Lowest elevation: 0 m (0 ft)

Population (2024 census)
  - Total: 26,855
  - Density: 37.537/km^{2} (97.220/sq mi)
  - Households: 6,513
- Demonym: Casiguranin

Economy
  - Income class: 1st municipal income class
  - Poverty incidence: 14.24% (2023)
  - Revenue: ₱ 316.4 million (2024)
  - Assets: ₱ 704.1 million (2024)
  - Expenditure: ₱ 270.8 million (2024)
  - Liabilities: ₱ 96.86 million (2024)

Service provider
  - Electricity: Aurora Electric Cooperative (AURELCO)
- Time zone: UTC+8 (PST)
- ZIP code: 3204
- PSGC: 0307702000
- IDD : area code: +63 (0)42
- Native languages: Dumagat Agta; Kasiguranin; Ilocano; Tagalog
- Website: www.casiguran-aurora.gov.ph

Casiguran [ˌkaːsɪˈguːɾan], officially the Municipality of Casiguran (Tagalog/Kasiguranin: Bayan ng Casiguran; Ilocano: Ili ti Casiguran), is a municipality in the province of Aurora, Philippines. According to the 2024 census, it has a population of 26,855 people.

The municipality is home to the Amro River Protected Landscape.

According to folk legend, the name Casiguran was obtained from the Ilocano term Sigod which means "edge" or "maximum", which is due to the location of the municipality at the northern edge of Aurora Province. (Another translation & definition of sigod is "soon" or "early") Another legend says that if an unmarried stranger comes to the place, he unavoidably falls in love and marries and most of the time stays for good. The affixation of sigod when converting it to a noun is kasigudan, from which the Hispanized pronunciation "Casiguran" is derived.

== History ==
Casiguran was founded by Spanish missionaries on June 13, 1609. Prior to their arrival, the inhabitants of the area were the Dumagats, Aetas, and Bugkalots, followed by migrants from other parts of the Philippines. These migrants spoke different languages such as Ilocano, Visayan languages, Tagalog, Bikol languages, Kapampangan, Gaddang, Itawis and Ibanag, and from these a Kasiguranin language evolved. In 1818, Nueva Ecija annexed Casiguran, as well as Baler, Infanta (formerly called Binangonan de Lampon) and the Polillo Islands from Tayabas, and Palanan from Isabela. Casiguran then became part of Nueva Vizcaya when it was created in 1839, then became part of El Príncipe District of the province of Nueva Ecija when it was created in 1856.

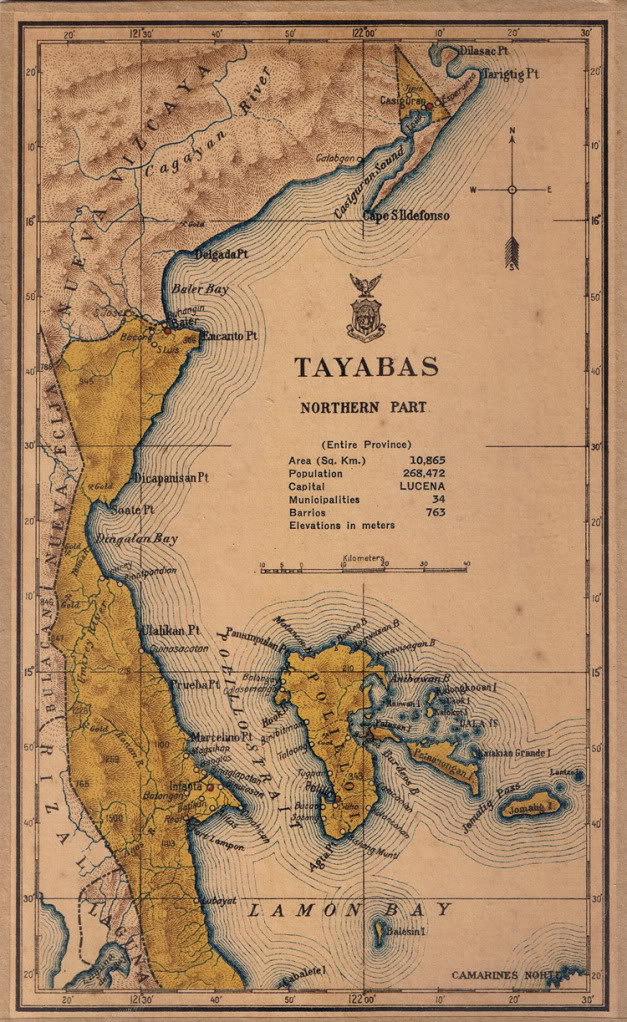
Map of northern Tayabas province, Philippines in 1918, showing Casiguran as Tayabas's northernmost municipality.

In 1902, Casiguran became part of the province of Tayabas (now Quezon). In 1905, the area of modern Dilasag was part of Nueva Vizcaya and was transferred to Tayabas through Casiguran. From 1906 to 1907, Casiguran was merged with the town of Baler, also then in Tayabas. Casiguran was transferred to Nueva Vizcaya in 1918, but restored to Tayabas in 1946.

In 1942, invading Japanese forces landed in the town of Casiguran. From February 19 to May 11, 1945, Allied troops as well as Philippine Commonwealth forces and recognized guerrilla units fought in the Battle of Casiguran during the return of American forces on Luzon in World War II. When the Philippines regained sovereignty in 1946, Aurora was still part of Tayabas and Casiguran was a lone northern town. Its political jurisdiction is bounded on the north by the province of Isabela, on the west by Quirino, and on the south west by Barangay Dinadiawan, which was then the boundary between Baler and Casiguran. In 1951, Casiguran became part of Quezon's sub-province of Aurora beginning in 1951.

In 1959 and 1966, the northern and south-western municipal districts (formerly barrios) of Dilasag and Dinalungan, alongside some nearby barrios, were made into separate municipalities.

On August 2, 1968, the 7.6-magnitude 1968 Casiguran earthquake struck near Casiguran.

Casiguran was later separated from Quezon and became part of the new province of Aurora on August 13, 1979.

== Geography ==
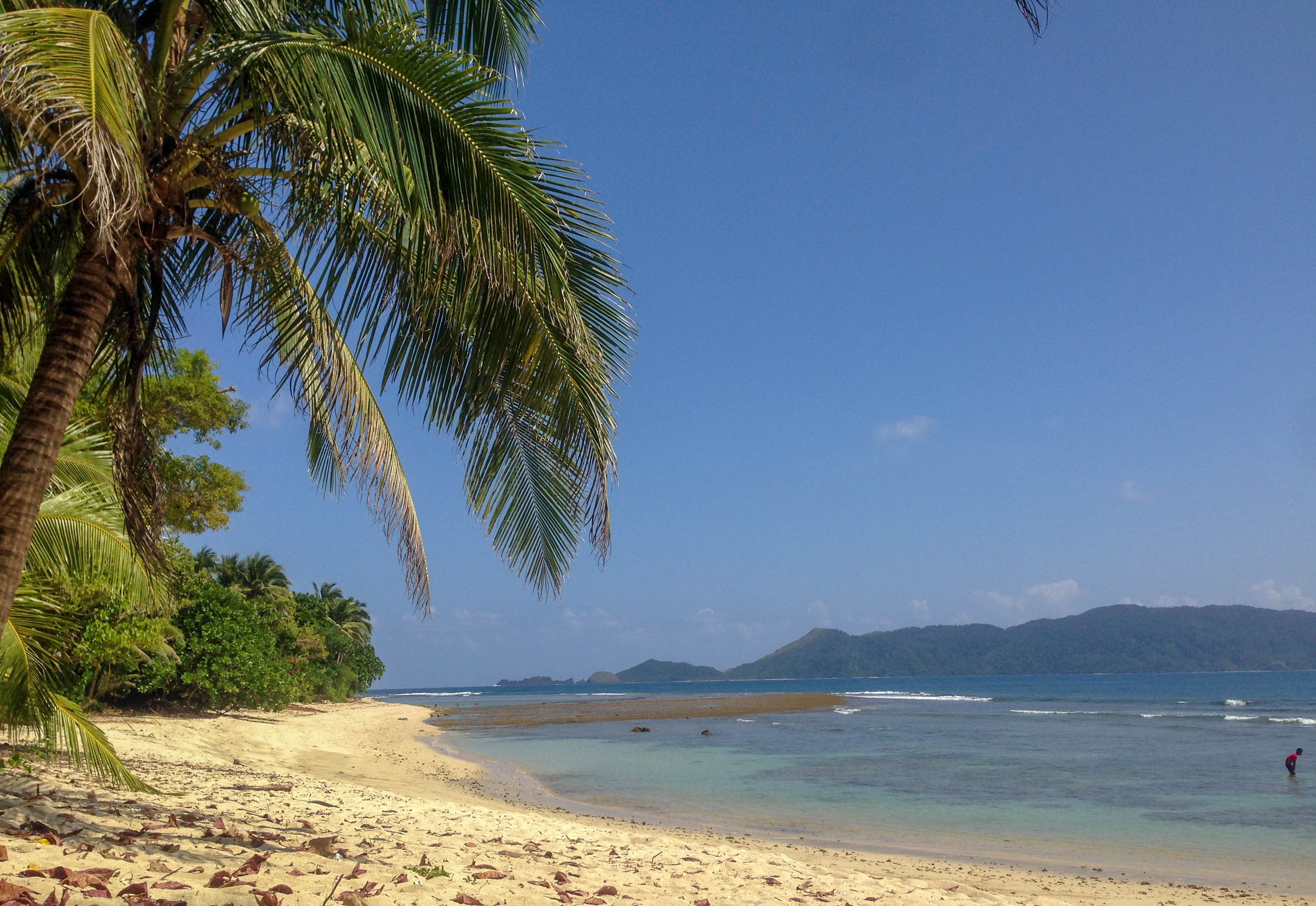
Casapsapan Beach at Casiguran's northeastern coast by the Casapsapan Bay

According to the Philippine Statistics Authority, the municipality has a land area of 715.43 square kilometers (276.23 sq mi) constituting 22.73% of the 3,147.32-square-kilometer- (1,215.19 sq mi) total area of Aurora.

Casiguran is situated 114.86 kilometres (71.37 mi) from the provincial capital Baler, and 367.17 kilometres (228.15 mi) from the country's capital city of Manila. It is bounded on the north-east by Dilasag, south-west by Dinalungan, north-west by Maddela, Quirino, and southeast by the Philippine Sea.

=== Barangays ===
Casiguran is politically subdivided into 24 barangays. Each barangay consists of puroks and some have sitios.

PSGC	Barangay	Population			±% p.a.	
		2024		2010		
037702001	Barangay 1 (Poblacion)	2.9%	790	799	▾	−0.08%
037702002	Barangay 2 (Poblacion)	2.5%	665	665	Steady	0.00%
037702003	Barangay 3 (Poblacion)	0.9%	235	257	▾	−0.62%
037702004	Barangay 4 (Poblacion)	1.1%	307	302	▴	0.11%
037702005	Barangay 5 (Poblacion)	1.6%	439	432	▴	0.11%
037702006	Barangay 6 (Poblacion)	1.2%	325	310	▴	0.33%
037702007	Barangay 7 (Poblacion)	1.1%	288	278	▴	0.25%
037702008	Barangay 8 (Poblacion)	2.3%	612	601	▴	0.13%
037702019	Bianuan	12.8%	3,443	3,440	▴	0.01%
037702009	Calabgan	2.4%	652	496	▴	1.91%
037702010	Calangcuasan	4.1%	1,104	1,099	▴	0.03%
037702011	Calantas	7.1%	1,916	1,799	▴	0.44%
037702020	Cozo	6.1%	1,637	1,618	▴	0.08%
037702012	Culat	2.9%	776	630	▴	1.46%
037702021	Dibacong	7.3%	1,954	2,374	▾	−1.34%
037702013	Dibet	3.6%	973	971	▴	0.01%
037702022	Ditinagyan	2.2%	591	587	▴	0.05%
037702014	Esperanza	1.9%	502	458	▴	0.64%
037702023	Esteves	6.7%	1,793	1,786	▴	0.03%
037702015	Lual	5.9%	1,588	1,482	▴	0.48%
037702016	Marikit	2.7%	735	609	▴	1.31%
037702024	San Ildefonso	4.2%	1,115	1,100	▴	0.09%
037702017	Tabas	3.9%	1,043	1,007	▴	0.24%
037702018	Tinib	3.1%	830	765	▴	0.57%
	Total		26,855	23,865	▴	0.82%

=== Climate ===
Climate data for Casiguran, Aurora (1991–2020, extremes 1949–2020)
Month	Jan	Feb	Mar	Apr	May	Jun	Jul	Aug	Sep	Oct	Nov	Dec	Year
Record high °C (°F)	33.0 (91.4)	33.9 (93.0)	35.3 (95.5)	36.8 (98.2)	38.0 (100.4)	39.2 (102.6)	37.4 (99.3)	40.0 (104.0)	37.5 (99.5)	35.6 (96.1)	34.2 (93.6)	35.6 (96.1)	40.0 (104.0)
Mean daily maximum °C (°F)	27.8 (82.0)	28.3 (82.9)	29.7 (85.5)	31.6 (88.9)	32.8 (91.0)	33.0 (91.4)	32.3 (90.1)	32.4 (90.3)	32.1 (89.8)	31.1 (88.0)	29.7 (85.5)	28.2 (82.8)	30.7 (87.3)
Daily mean °C (°F)	24.0 (75.2)	24.3 (75.7)	25.4 (77.7)	26.9 (80.4)	28.1 (82.6)	28.5 (83.3)	28.0 (82.4)	28.0 (82.4)	27.7 (81.9)	26.9 (80.4)	25.9 (78.6)	24.7 (76.5)	26.5 (79.7)
Mean daily minimum °C (°F)	20.1 (68.2)	20.2 (68.4)	21.1 (70.0)	22.3 (72.1)	23.5 (74.3)	23.9 (75.0)	23.7 (74.7)	23.7 (74.7)	23.3 (73.9)	22.7 (72.9)	22.1 (71.8)	21.3 (70.3)	22.3 (72.1)
Record low °C (°F)	10.5 (50.9)	9.0 (48.2)	11.2 (52.2)	11.4 (52.5)	14.0 (57.2)	18.0 (64.4)	18.7 (65.7)	15.0 (59.0)	16.0 (60.8)	15.0 (59.0)	13.0 (55.4)	11.6 (52.9)	9.0 (48.2)
Average rainfall mm (inches)	295.4 (11.63)	250.7 (9.87)	239.6 (9.43)	174.7 (6.88)	235.7 (9.28)	217.3 (8.56)	298.9 (11.77)	216.2 (8.51)	285.0 (11.22)	469.8 (18.50)	645.7 (25.42)	665.3 (26.19)	3,994.3 (157.26)
Average rainy days (≥ 1.0 mm)	16	13	13	11	13	13	15	13	15	15	18	18	173
Average relative humidity (%)	89	88	88	87	86	86	87	86	88	88	89	90	88
Source: PAGASA

== Demographics ==
Population census of Casiguran
Year	Pop.	±% p.a.
1903	2,067	—
1918	2,567	+1.45%
1939	6,393	+4.44%
1948	5,643	−1.38%
1960	6,900	+1.69%
1970	12,128	+5.79%
1975	11,670	−0.77%
1980	13,925	+3.60%
1990	18,375	+2.81%
1995	19,578	+1.20%
2000	21,459	+1.99%
2007	22,403	+0.60%
2010	23,865	+2.33%
2015	24,313	+0.35%
2020	26,564	+1.88%
2024	26,855	+0.26%
Source: Philippine Statistics Authority

In the 2024 census, Casiguran had a population of 26,855 people. The population density was 38 inhabitants per square kilometer (98/sq mi).

In 1960, the population of Casiguran was 6,900. This was almost doubled by the 1970s when population was 12,128, an increase of about 76% (5.8% annual average growth rate). Between 1970 and 1975, there was a marked decreased in the number of population from 12,128 to 11,670. This reduction was due to deteriorated peace and order, which forced some of the population to move away. The trend reversed by 1980, with an increase of 19% or an annual average growth rate increase of 3.86%. Increasing population continued during the succeeding censal years (1980 to 1995) but with a declining annual average population growth rate. This is attributed to the gradual stoppage of logging operations in the area. Many workers involved in this trade were not original residents, so when the jobs were no longer available, they left. Between 1995 and 1999 there was a significant increase of the annual average population growth rate to 4.36%.

== Economy ==
Poverty incidence of Casiguran (%)

Source: Philippine Statistics Authority

== Education ==
The Casiguran Schools District Office governs all educational institutions within the municipality. It oversees the management and operations of all private and public, from primary to secondary schools.

=== Primary and elementary schools ===
- Agues Elementary School
- Bianoan Elementary School
- C. J. Torre Elementary School
- Calantas Elementary School
- Casiguran Adventist Elementary School
- Casiguran Central School
- Dibacong Elementary School
- Dibet Elementary School
- Dumaguipo Elementary School
- Esperanza Elementary School
- Francisco Benitez Elementary School
- Gumacas Essential Missionary School
- Home of Muntisuri Baptist Academy
- Martin Esteves Elementary School
- Paraiso Elementary School
- San Ildefonso Elementary School
- Tribal Center for Development Foundation, Inc. - Sentrong Paaralan ng mga Agta

=== Secondary schools ===
- Calabgan-Ditinagyan Integrated School
- Casiguran National High School
- Dibacong National High School
- Lual National High School
- Tinib-Calangcuasan Integrated School

=== Higher educational institution ===
- Mount Carmel College of Casiguran

== Notable personalities ==
- Athena Imperial - news field reporter, communication researcher and Miss Philippines Earth 2011.

== See also ==
- 1968 Casiguran earthquake
