= El ministerio del tiempo =

Spanish television series (2015–2020)

- Also known as: The Ministry of Time
- Genre: Science fiction
- Created by: Pablo Olivares; Javier Olivares
- Written by: José Ramón Fernández; Paco López Barrio; Javier Olivares; Pablo Olivares; Anaïs Schaaff
- Directed by: Marc Vigil; Jorge Dorado; Abigail Schaaff
- Creative director: Javier Olivares
- Starring: Rodolfo Sancho; Hugo Silva; Aura Garrido; Nacho Fresneda; Macarena García; Cayetana Guillén-Cuervo; Juan Gea; Francesca Piñón; Jaime Blanch
- Country of origin: Spain
- Original language: Spanish
- No. of seasons: 4
- No. of episodes: 42

Production
- Executive producers: Javier Olivares; Alicia Yubero; María Roy; Marc Vigil
- Running time: 70 minutes approx.
- Production companies: Onza Partners (s. 1-3); Cliffhanger (s. 1-3); RTVE; Motion Content Group; Globomedia (s. 4)

Original release
- Network: La 1
- Release: 24 February 2015 – 23 June 2020

El ministerio del tiempo (English title: The Ministry of Time) is a Spanish fantasy television series created by Javier and Pablo Olivares and produced by Onza Partners and Cliffhanger for Radiotelevisión Española (RTVE). It premiered on 24 February 2015 on La 1 of Televisión Española (TVE). The series follows the exploits of an investigative team in the fictional Ministry of Time, which deals with incidents caused by time travel that can cause changes to the present day.

On 24 March 2015, it was confirmed that RTVE had renewed the series for a second season. The show was renewed for a third season on 22 September 2016. On 29 December 2016, it was announced that RTVE had sold the rights to Netflix to broadcast the third season internationally, outside of Spain, resulting in a bigger production budget.

The series was renewed for a fourth season, which started airing on TVE on 5 May 2020. It was known that HBO had acquired the broadcasting rights for the series, at least on HBO Spain and HBO Portugal.

== Plot ==
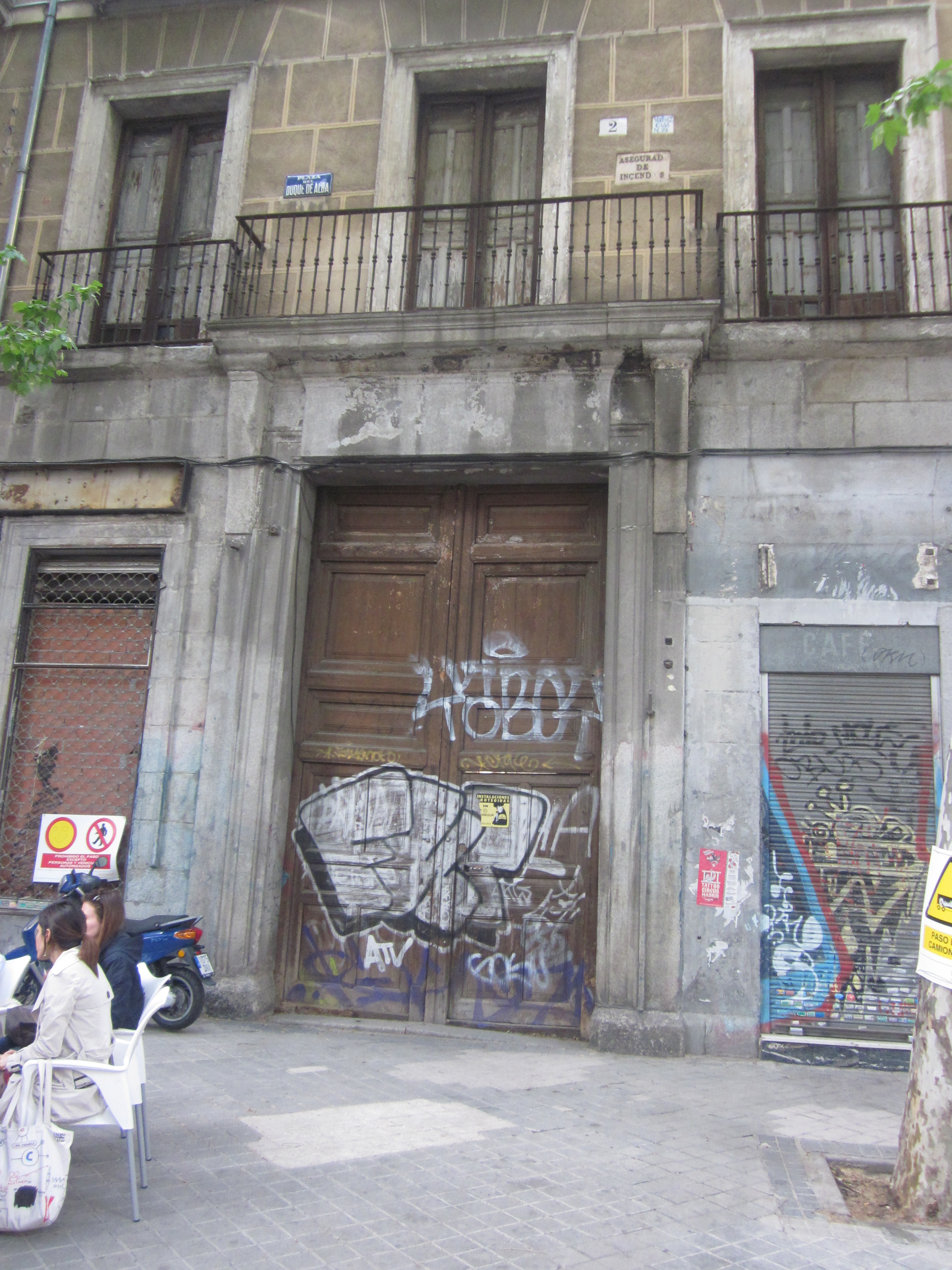
The abandoned Palace of the Duchess of Sueca in Madrid, featured in the series as the façade of the Ministry's headquarters.

The Ministry of Time is the best kept and most closely guarded secret of the Spanish government: an autonomous government institution that reports directly to the Prime Minister and the Spanish Monarch. Its patrols watch the doors of time so that no intruder from other eras can change history for their own benefit.

The series follows the assignments of the Ministry's newest patrol: the one formed by Army of Flanders soldier Alonso de Entrerríos, 19th century student Amelia Folch and 21st century SAMUR paramedic Julián Martínez.

== Cast and characters ==
=== Main characters ===
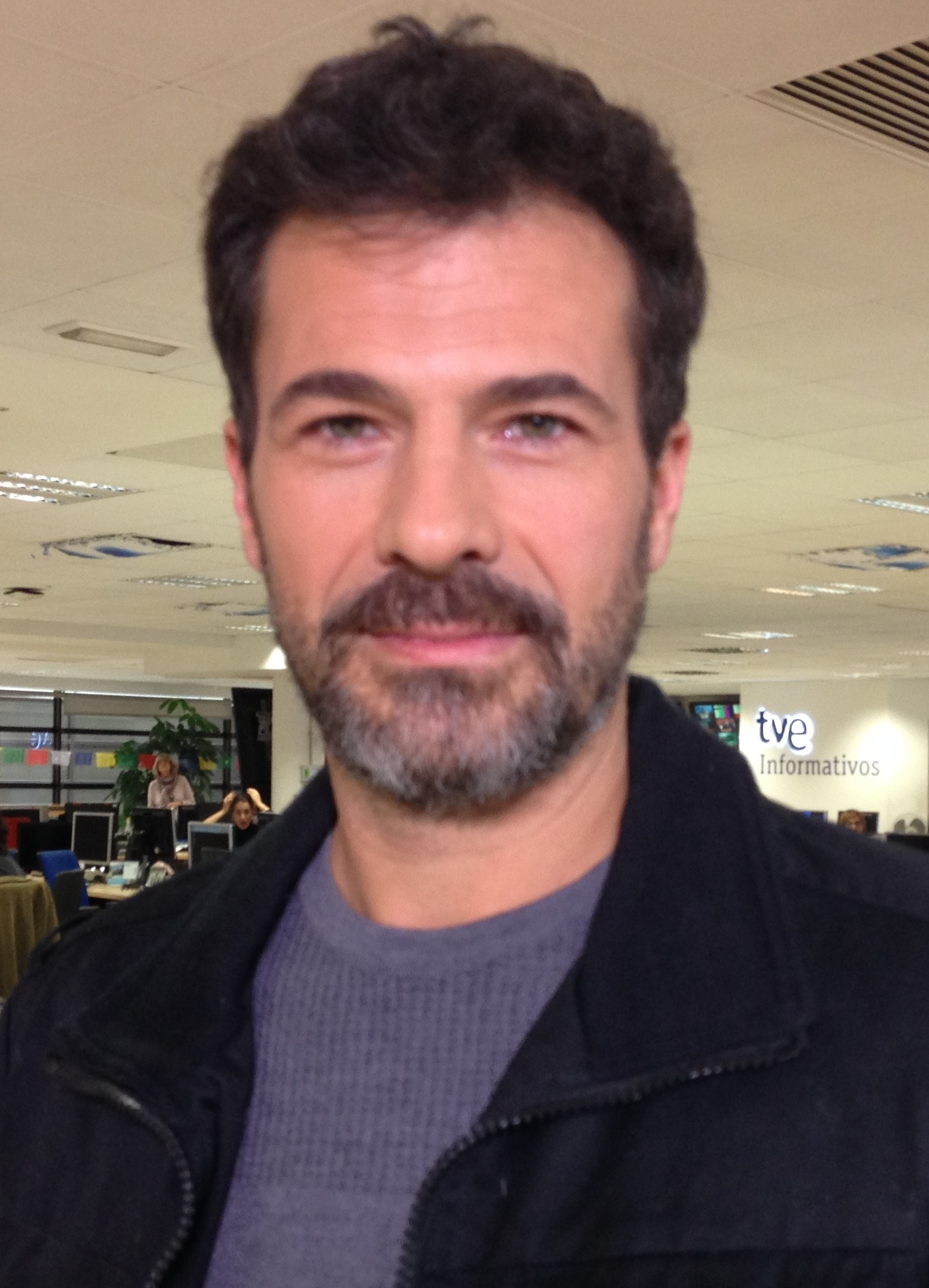
Rodolfo Sancho

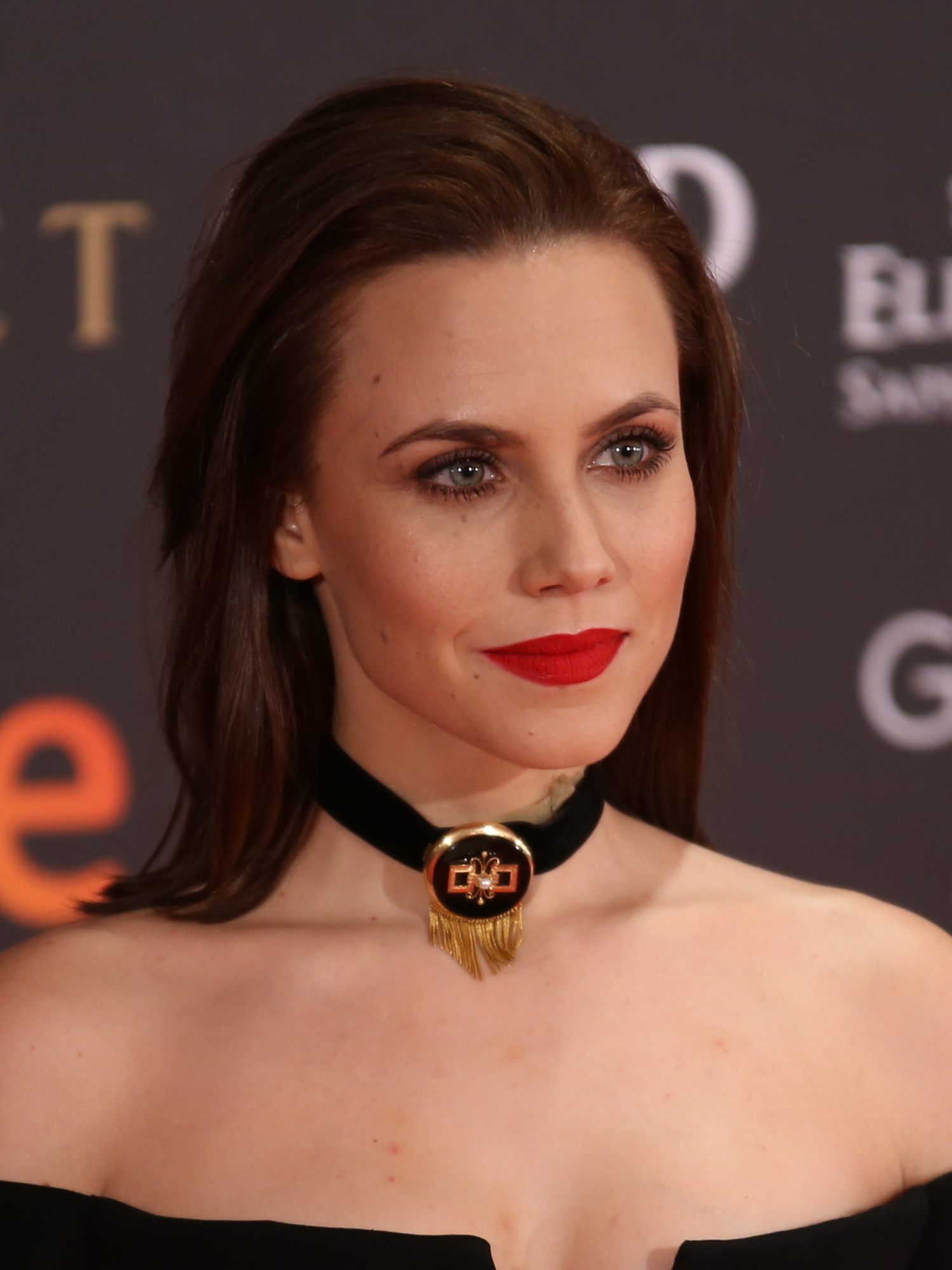
Aura Garrido

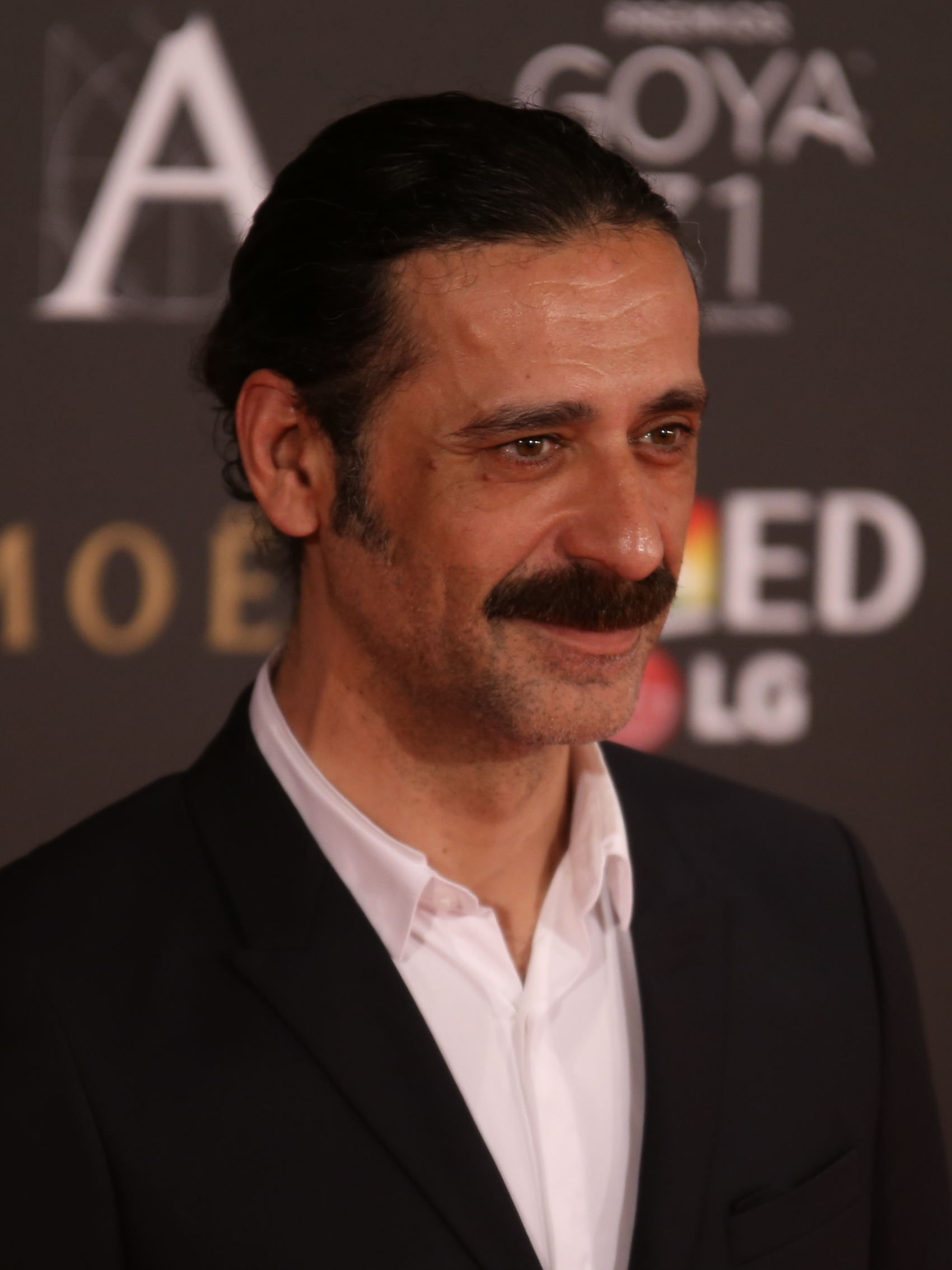
Nacho Fresneda

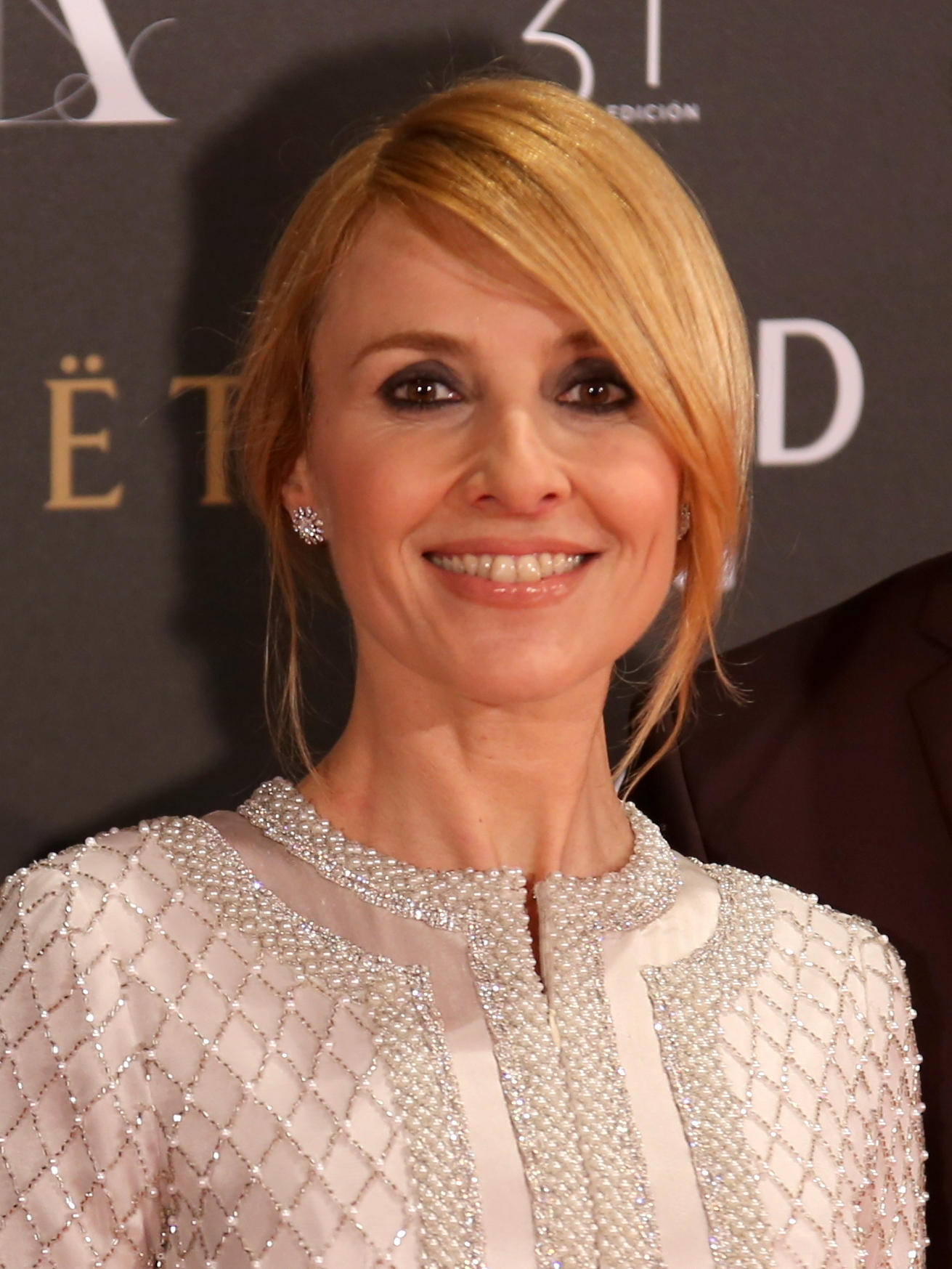
Cayetana Guillén Cuervo

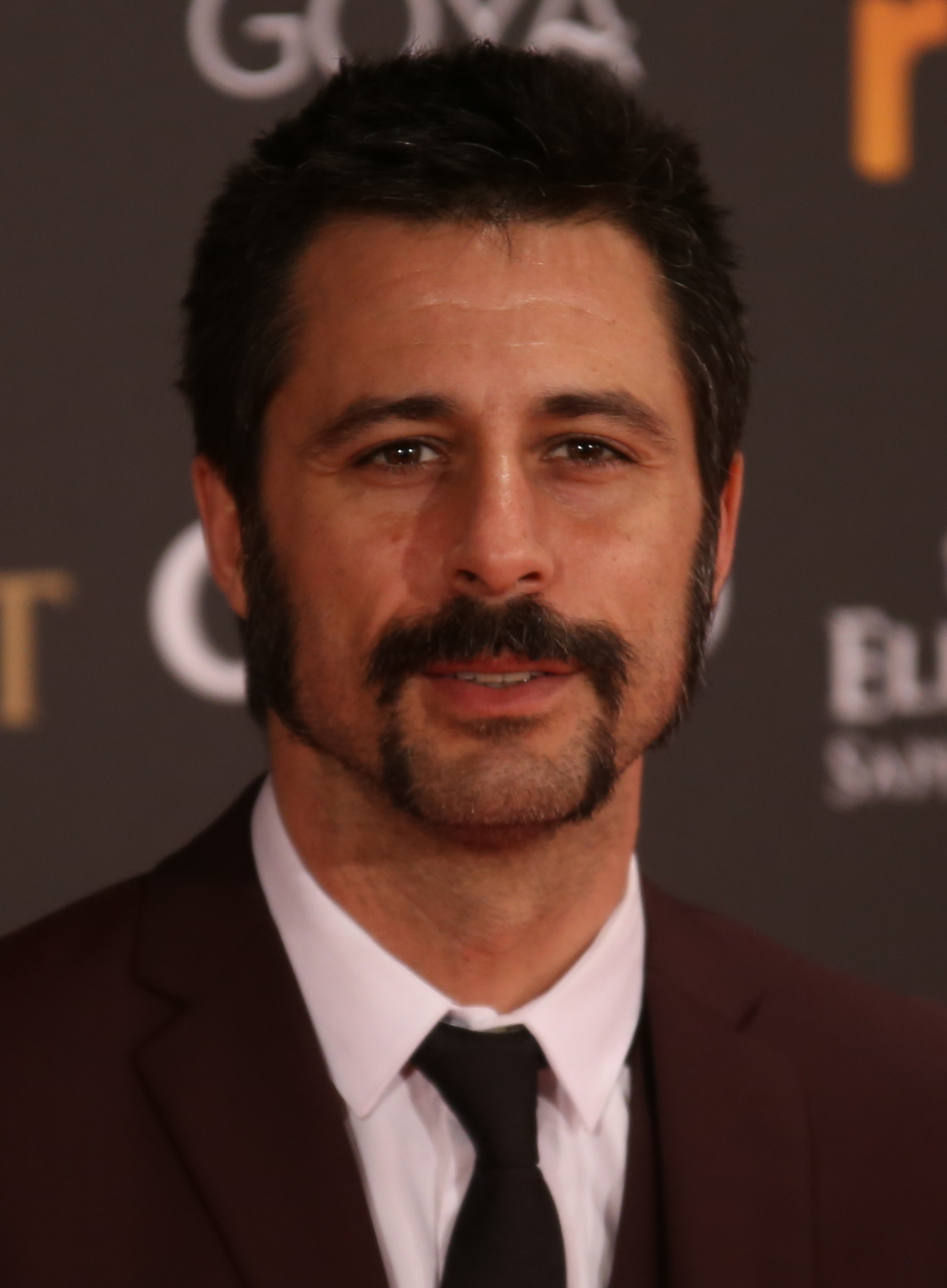
Hugo Silva

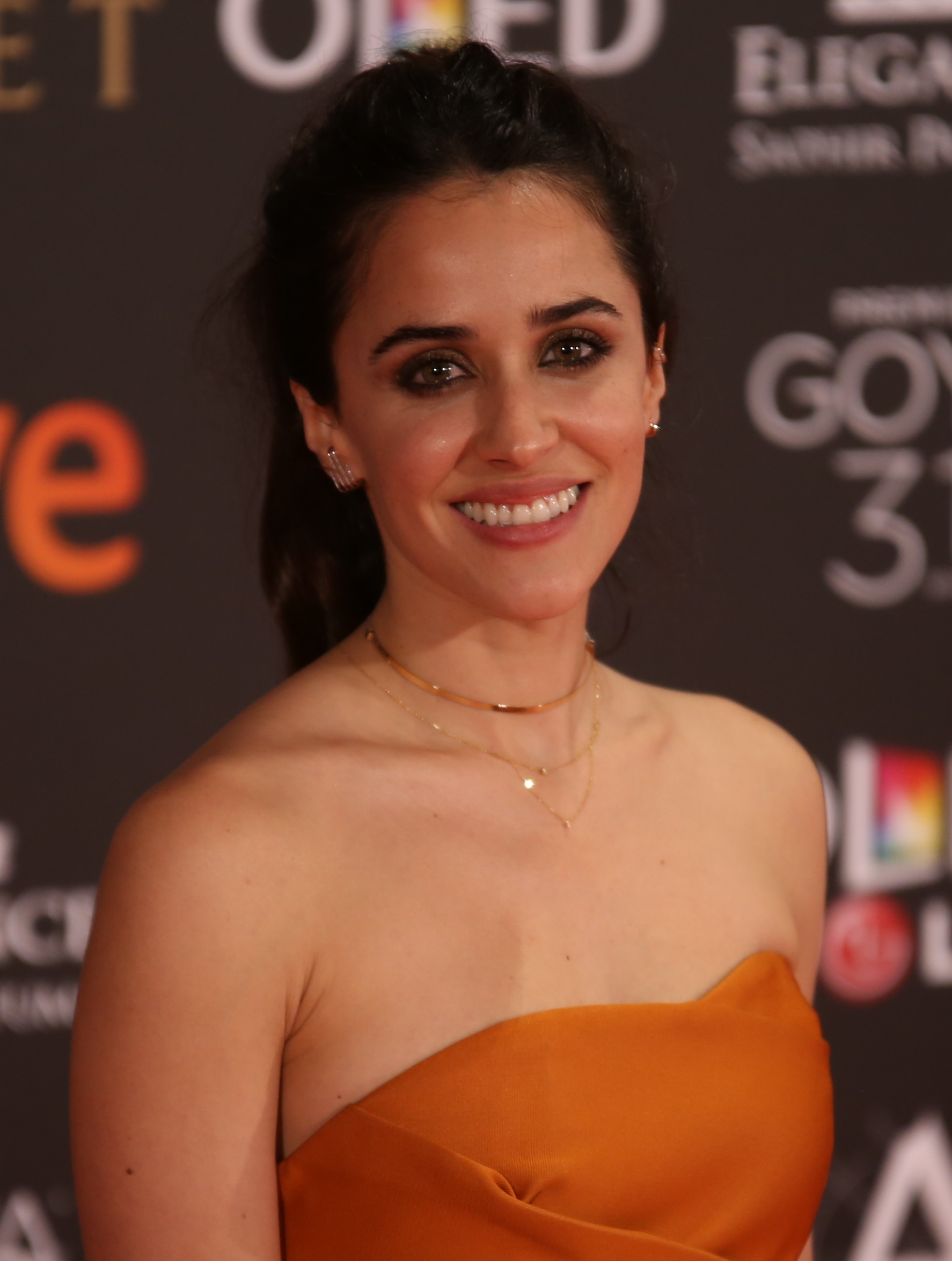
Macarena García

- Julián Martínez (Rodolfo Sancho), one of three members of the new patrol. He is a trained SAMUR paramedic from 21st century Madrid, present as a member of the patrol through season 1 and the second half of season 2. His absence during the first half of season 2 was due to shooting for Spanish crime drama series Mar de plástico, and he left the series at the end of that season after failing to reach an agreement with the show's producers. In November 2019, however, it was confirmed he will return for season 4.
- Amelia Folch (Aura Garrido), the leader of the patrol. She is a late 19th-century pioneering university student and an only child from an upper-class Barcelona family, still living with her parents. Garrido left the series halfway through the third season, citing scheduling conflicts after she, like Sancho, signed on to other projects due to renewal uncertainty. She left on good terms and was open to returning in the future. In November 2019, her return in season 4 was confirmed.
- Alonso de Entrerríos (Nacho Fresneda), the third member of the three-member patrol. A highly experienced 16th-century soldier from Seville, he is portrayed as an expert in fields of combat. He was recruited just prior to being executed, and now lives in the 21st century with a wife and a baby.
- Irene Larra Girón (Cayetana Guillén Cuervo), Head of Logistics inside the Ministry. A lesbian from the repressed 1960s, her character is used to express a less rigid viewpoint within the Ministry.
- Ernesto Jiménez (Juan Gea), Chief Operating Officer inside the Ministry. Recruited from the 15th century, he is fiercely incorruptible and a perfectionist. In the fourth episode of Season 1 it is disclosed that he is the father of Tomás de Torquemada, the first Grand Inquisitor of the Spanish Inquisition.
- Undersecretary Salvador Martí (Jaime Blanch), Head of the Ministry. His (and the Ministry's) overriding priority is to protect and repair history.
- Angustias Vázquez (Francesca Piñón), personal secretary to Salvador and widow of a Ministry agent.
- Jesús Méndez Pontón (Hugo Silva), AKA "Pacino", a replacement member for Julián in the second and third seasons. He is a handsome police officer from 1981 Madrid, nicknamed "Pacino" due to his resemblance to actor Al Pacino, whom he admires.
- Lola Mendieta (Natalia Millán): A former agent of the Ministry who was believed to have died on a mission. She provided information about clandestine doors of time to a number of people. Her younger self (played by Macarena García) is recruited to the Ministry, eventually joining the patrol. She is the first and only agent to ever be recruited twice.

=== Recurring characters ===
- Diego Velázquez (Julián Villagrán): One of the most important painters in Spanish history, known for Las Meninas and The Surrender of Breda, who was recruited by the Ministry as a facial composite draftsman.
- Enric Folch (Xavier Boada) and Carme (Fanny Gautier): Amelia's parents. While he appears more tolerant about his daughter's concerns, she presses her to marry and settle down.
- Blanca (Susana Córdoba): Alonso's wife, who believes him to be dead since she does not know his execution was avoided by the Ministry.
- Elena Castillo (Susana Córdoba): Alonso's love interest in the present day and Bianca's doppelgänger.
- Susana Torres (Mar Saura): The Prime Minister's liaison with the Ministry. Her visits usually mean bad news for Salvador.
- Lucía (Luisa Gavasa): Appears in the 3rd season claiming to be Lola Mendieta's daughter.
- Ambrogio Spinola (Ramón Langa): One of the main generals of the Spanish Army during the 17th century, most notable for the siege of Breda. He works for the Ministry, and admits he made the mistake of reading about his fate in the books.
- Enriqueta Martí (María Rodríguez): A serial murderer who worked as Amelia's maid for a short time.
- Marisa (Nieve de Medina): An old love interest of Ernesto's who has returned to work in the Ministry.
- Armando Leiva (José Antonio Lobato): A former agent who rebelled against the Ministry when Salvador refused to allow him to bring his 10-year-old son, diagnosed with leukemia, to the present so that doctors from the 21st century could tend to him.
- Maite (Mar Ulldemolins): Julián's late wife, whom he visits by way of the doors of time.
- Paul Walcott (Jimmy Shaw): An American time traveller who worked for mysterious corporation Darrow Ltd.
- Bosco de Sobrecasa (Luis Iglesia): A high-ranking member, possibly the leader, of the Society of the Exterminating Angel, which has discovered the existence of the Ministry and plans to use the time doors to fully restore absolute monarchy in Spain across history.
- Juan Martín Díez "El Empecinado" (Hovik Keuchkerian): A notable guerrilla combatant who becomes the target of two Napoleonic soldiers who travel to 2015 and find out about his role in the impending Peninsular War.

=== Cast ===
List indicators

This section includes characters who have appeared in the series as members of the main cast.

- An empty grey cell indicates the character was not in the season.
- ^{O} indicates an older version of the character.
- ^{Y} indicates a younger version of the character.

Character	Portrayed by	Seasons			
Character	Portrayed by	1	2	3	4
Julián Martínez	Rodolfo Sancho	Main (Note: 1x01–2x01, 2x07–2x13)	Main		Main (Note: 4x01, 4x03–4x05, 4x07–4x08)
Amelia Folch	Aura Garrido	Main (Note: 1x01–3x06)	Main	Main	Guest (Note: 4x03)
Alonso de Entrerríos	Nacho Fresneda	Main (Note: 1x01–4x03, 4x05–4x08)	Main	Main	Main
Irene Larra Girón	Cayetana Guillén Cuervo	Main	Main	Main	Main
Ernesto Jiménez (Note: Pedro Fernández de Torquemada)	Juan Gea	Main	Main	Main	Main
Salvador Martí	Jaime Blanch	Main	Main	Main	Main
Angustias Vázquez	Francesca Piñón	Main	Main	Main	Main
Jesús Méndez Pontón "Pacino"	Hugo Silva		Main (Note: 2x02–4x08)	Main	Main
Lola Mendieta	Natalia Millán	Recurring	Recurring	Recurring	
Lola Mendieta	Macarena García			Main^{Y} (Note: 3x02–4x02, 4x04–4x05)	Main^{Y}
Lola Mendieta	Fiorella Faltoyano				Guest^{O} (Note: 4x08)
Diego Velázquez	Julián Villagrán	Recurring	Recurring	Recurring	Main
Carolina Bravo Mendoza	Manuela Vellés				Main
Blanca/Elena Castillo	Susana Córdoba	Recurring	Recurring	Recurring	Recurring
Maite	Mar Ulldemolins	Recurring	Guest		Guest
Susana Torres	Mar Saura	Guest	Recurring		
Lucía	Luisa Gavasa			Recurring	
Ambrogio Spinola	Ramón Langa	Guest	Guest		
Gil Pérez	Miguel Rellán	Guest	Guest		
Lope de Vega	Víctor Clavijo	Guest	Guest	Guest	
Federico García Lorca	Ángel Ruiz	Guest			Recurring
Adolf Hitler	Miko Jarry	Guest		Guest	
Miguel de Cervantes	Pere Ponce		Guest	Guest	
Marta Cascajosa	Belén Fabra			Recurring	
Bosco de Sobrecasa	Luis Iglesia			Recurring	
Carlos Munuera Mateu	Marcel Borràs				Recurring
Juan Salcedo	Daniel Pérez Prada				Recurring

== Episodes ==
=== Season 1 ===
No. overall	No. in series	Title	Directed by	Original release date	Viewers (millions)
1	1	"El tiempo es el que es (Time is what it is)"	Marc Vigil	February 24, 2015	2.98
Julián Martínez is a SAMUR paramedic depressed over the death of his wife. During a fire, he encounters two men dressed as in the days of Napoleon. After convalescence, he is recruited by the Ministry of Time, alongside 19th century student Amelia Folch and 16th century soldier Alonso de Entrerríos, to travel to 1808 to stop the French from killing guerrilla captain Juan Martín Díez.
2	2	"Tiempo de Gloria (Time of glory)"	Abigail Schaaff	March 2, 2015	2.65
Gil Pérez, a prestigious agent of the Ministry during the reign of Philip II, finds out that the writer Lope de Vega, who joins the Spanish Armada, did not embark on San Juan, one of the few ships that returned from England, as planned. Instead, he is on San Esteban, where he will most likely be killed. Julián, Amelia and Alonso travel to Lisbon in 1588 to ensure that Lope embarks on the right ship.
3	3	"Cómo se reescribe el tiempo (How does time get rewritten)"	Marc Vigil	March 9, 2015	2.65
Himmler, informed of the existence of a door in the Monastery of Montserrat, travels there to make use of it, taking advantage of the meeting at Hendaye between Adolf Hitler and Francisco Franco. The Nazi aim is to rewrite history. By travelling to Montserrat, Amelia, Julián and Alonso are tasked with avoiding this, whilst Ernesto and Irene go to Hendaye, to disrupt the negotiations between Hitler and Franco for the participation of Spain in the Second World War.
4	4	"Una negociación a tiempo (A deal in time)"	Jorge Dorado	March 16, 2015	2.93
The Ministry of Time was established in 1491 by Isabella I of Castile after obtaining the Book of Doors from Rabbi Abraham Levi in exchange of protection for him and his family. The queen promised to protect him, but cruel Grand Inquisitor Tomás de Torquemada sentenced him to the stake behind her back. The lawyer of the Rabbi's family has found documents that prove the queen did nothing to protect him and demands heavy compensation from the Ministry in exchange of his silence. Against the rules of the Ministry, Julián, Amelia and Alonso are sent to 1491 to save Levi, but the door to that year is in a time loop and they only have one day to accomplish their mission.
5	5	"Cualquier tiempo pasado (Every past time)"	Abigail Schaaff	March 23, 2015	2.53
In 1981, Pablo Picasso's famed painting Guernica came back to Spain from New York City's Museum of Modern Art to celebrate the consolidation of Spanish democracy. The Ministry receives reports that someone in that year is trying to prevent the return from happening. Salvador sends Julián, Amelia and Alonso to the Civil War to find the receipt of the order, and later to 1981 to ensure that the painting will make it back to Spain.
6	6	"Tiempo de pícaros (Time of rascals)"	Marc Vigil	March 30, 2015	2.11
A mobile phone appears in an archaeological excavation in Salamanca meant to find remains from the 16th century. It is revealed that the phone belongs to an entrepreneur of the present who absconded in 2013 after his business was exposed as a fraud. The patrol travel to 1520 to find him, with the unexpected help of a young boy named Lázaro de Tormes, who they will also have to save after he is arrested and sentenced to death. Meanwhile, Irene interrogates Paul Walcott, captured by the Ministry and locked in a 1053 prison in Huesca.
7	7	"Tiempo de venganza (Time of revenge)"	Jorge Dorado	April 6, 2015	2.19
In 1843, Isabella II of Spain becomes queen at the age of 13 (with her mother Maria Christina assuming regency), and a year later, she demands to visit the Ministry of Time. Rebel former Ministry agent Armando Leiva, who recruited Irene back in 1960, has escaped from prison in the Middle Age and plans to capitalize on the visit to kill the queen. With the very existence of the Ministry at stake, Ernesto, Amelia and Alonso are sent to foil Leiva's plans, but when they are captured, they depend on Irene, under suspicion for Leiva's escape, and Julián, who is enjoying his wife's company.
8	8	"La leyenda del tiempo (Legend of time)"	Marc Vigil	April 13, 2015	2.25
A tablet computer appears on the poster advertising a 1924 performance of Don Juan Tenorio. Julián, Amelia and Alonso head to the Residencia de Estudiantes that year to retrieve it, where they meet writer Federico García Lorca, painter Salvador Dalí and filmmaker Luis Buñuel. They soon discover that it is a ruse planned by someone who knows the Ministry, and they begin to receive photos of their lives in the past and the future.

=== Season 2 ===
No. overall	No. in series	Title	Directed by	Original release date	Viewers (millions)
9	1	"Tiempo de leyenda (Time of legend)"	Marc Vigil	February 15, 2016	2.84
The Ministry is still recovering from the impact of Irene's betrayal. Lola Mendieta is in prison. Julián is back after some rest and psychiatric treatment, and a new case awaits: the discovery of dated remains that could belong to El Cid, who was thought to be buried in Burgos cathedral. Alonso and Amelia are sent with Ambrogio Spinola to the eleventh century to lead the investigation, which means pulling Julián from the team.
10	2	"El tiempo en sus manos (The time on his hands)"	Marc Vigil	February 22, 2016	2.68
After Julián's departure, Salvador activates every protocol of search for him to be arrested wherever in time he may have gone. Meanwhile, a 1981 policeman arrives in the present chasing a murderer who fled through a closet. His name is Jesús Méndez, nicknamed "Pacino" for his resemblance to the actor, and finds out that the police files claim he is guilty of the murders he was investigating and has been missing for 35 years. He must catch the killer to prove his innocence.
11	3	"Tiempo de hidalgos (Time of hidalgos)"	Abigail Schaaff	February 29, 2016	2.67
The Ministry receives a warning from late 1604 from Juan de la Cuesta's workshop, 87 Atocha St. The printing has made a deal with Miguel de Cervantes to publish the Princeps edition of Don Quixote but they have been warned that he did not present it to the Castilla's Council to ask for the printing license. It may therefore never be published. To solve the case, Pacino will be a part of the team for the first time.
12	4	"El Monasterio del Tiempo (The monastery of time)"	Jorge Dorado	March 7, 2016	2.59
In Christmas 1808, during the Peninsular War, Napoleon Bonaparte had to sleep on the Santa Clara de Tordesillas' abbey. In that same abbey, the Napoleonic troops have arrested three men: Tordesillas' priest, and two Spanish men accused of spying on the French movements on the zone. According to history, the intervention of the abbess convinced Napoleon to pardon the life of the three men. But the Ministry has been warned that the abbess died before what history says. One of the three men is an ancestor of Adolfo Suárez, President of the Government of Spain during transition. If the history changes and Napoleon executes them, Adolfo Suárez will not be born.
13	5	"Un virus de otro tiempo (A virus from another time)"	Abigail Schaaff	March 14, 2016	2.47
During a mission in 1918 to attend the birth of Carmen Amaya, Irene falls ill with the Spanish flu. Dr Vargas, who accompanied the mission, decides to return to the Ministry and leave Irene behind. However, Susana Torres, the new undersecretary, orders that procedures be followed and Irene must be brought back. With this, all of the Ministry will be at the mercy of a disease that killed millions and for which there is no vaccine. The Ministry is forced to close its doors to avoid spreading the disease through time. Inside, the flu begins to exact its first victims, and Susana Torres sees that it is not as easy as she thought to govern the Ministry.
14	6	"Tiempo de magia (Time of magic)"	Paco Plaza	March 21, 2016	2.20
Joaquín Argamasilla is a young man who claims to have a gift: to see through objects even when blindfolded. His followers include Ramón del Valle-Inclán and Santiago Ramón y Cajal. When his fame transcends borders, he is called to New York by the magician and escapologist Harry Houdini to see if his powers are real. The problem is that Argamasilla is an agent of the Ministry of that time and is suspected of betraying its existence to the Americans. The patrol is escorted to New York so that, in the event that the suspicions are true, he does not succeed.
15	7	"Tiempo de valientes I (Time of the braves - part one)"	Marc Vigil	March 28, 2016	2.33
In the Ministry, Salvador has retaken control. Upon arrival, the Ministry is subject to audit and all agents - including the patrol - must perform administrative and supervisory tasks over the time portals. Meanwhile, Julián, after finding that the Ministry has discovered his position, leaves the Cuban War of Independence and travels to the Philippines, only to witness further pain inflicted by Spanish soldiers. After swearing to a dying man that he will take a gem of his grandmother's to his Tagalog lover, he travels to Baler, where he is besieged.
16	8	"Tiempo de valientes II (Time of the braves - part two)"	Marc Vigil	April 4, 2016	2.47
Julián is still trapped in the Siege of Baler. Located at random by the Ministry, Salvador sends Alonso de Entrerríos to release him on a secret mission that even Amelia and Pacino know nothing of. Alonso and Julián witness the heroism of men defending a place without weapons, without food and consumed by disease. They are fighting for what they believe to be Spanish territory without knowing that that had ceased to be: Spain had already renounced its rights over Cuba and the Philippines. Given the prolonged absence of Alonso, Amelia and Pacino suspect that behind it all there is something questionable.
17	9	"Óleo sobre tiempo (Oil painting over time)"	Jorge Dorado	April 25, 2016	1.91
Velázquez receives an alarm on his mobile. One of his paintings has just been auctioned in 2016 at a stratospheric price. The problem is that it is one of the paintings destroyed by fire at the Alcázar de Madrid in 1734. In the absence of patrols due to a labor agreement, Velázquez, himself, and Irene travel there to investigate what is happening.
18	10	"Separadas en el tiempo (Separated by time)"	Abigail Schaaff	May 2, 2016	1.75
In the present, Irene visits an exhibition on the role of women in the struggle for social rights in Spain. There is a school group with their teacher, who faints upon seeing a woman like her in a photo from 1930 of the Sinsombrero, a group of avant-garde women who have been largely forgotten. As an investigation into the case begins, an alarm in the Ministry arises: the Vampire of Raval has not been arrested when history says and walks free. The situation worsens as it is realised that she is not only free, but also knows time travel.
19	11	"Tiempo de lo oculto (Time of the Occult)"	Javier Ruiz Caldera	May 10, 2016	2.03
Sebastián Lombardi, a visionary who directed a television show about paranormal researches that was cancelled after he casually discovered the Ministry and threatened to expose it, is back for revenge now that he no longer needs TV for his show thanks to social networks. He is invited to visit the Ministry, which the agents attempt to make him see as a common government building, but he escapes through one of the time doors to La Rábida in 1485, when Christopher Columbus has just arrived to sell King Ferdinand and Queen Isabella his project of a new route to India. The ministry attempts to track him down.
20	12	"Hasta que el tiempo os separe (Until time do you part)"	Jorge Dorado	May 16, 2016	2.12
Salvador and Julián attend a wedding in a castle. The castle is the site of a local legend, of the young Constanza who could not marry her beloved (a humble shepherd) because of Fadrique, lord of the castle, in 1212. The legend is in fact true, and the castle contains a time portal not catalogued by the Ministry.
21	13	"Cambio de tiempo (Change of time)"	Marc Vigil	May 23, 2016	2.01
After the defeat of the Spanish Armada along the English coast, Philip II, sunk by the disaster, decides to break the rules of the Ministry (imposed by Isabella) and travel back in time to correct errors and have the Armada win the battle. Following the refusal of the Ministry in 1588 to collaborate, Philip takes hold of the Inquisition, enters the Ministry and discovers that not only can he travel into the past but also the future. He plants himself in 2016 so that he can not only be king of the world, but also king of time. When the patrol returns from a mission where they saved one of the fathers of the Constitution of 1812, they find that history has changed.

=== Season 3 ===
No. overall	No. in series	Title	Directed by	Original release date	Viewers (millions)
22	1	"Con el tiempo en los talones (With time on his heels)"	Marc Vigil	June 1, 2017	2.04
Julian is killed in the 1937 Battle of Teruel. Grieving, Amelia and Alonso answer a call from Pacino. He's unofficially at the 1958 San Sebastián International Film Festival where Alfred Hitchcock is the Guest of Honour. But, in a Vertigo-like twist, fellow ministry of time agent (and lover) Marta is killed in a fall. Pacino interrogates a captured spy to find the Soviets plan to kidnap Hitchcock to produce propaganda films. Dodging more riffs from his films, the agents save Hitchcock but, Marnie-like, Pacino sees Marta alive! Back at the Ministry, Salvador uses a wheelchair due to a broken leg. He spots one construction worker going into the ministry. Irene dismisses him as a lost worker but he later hides in the corridors, poisons a Soviet prisoner, and plots sabotage...
23	2	"Tiempo de espías (Time of spies)"	Jorge Dorado	June 8, 2017	1.73
The agents travel to 1943 Spain and France to ensure "Operation Mincemeat" goes through. The plot will fool Hitler into defending Greece instead of Sicily, but needs a fresh corpse for the deception. Instead they get a live volunteer. Ernesto and a young Lola are captured and tortured by Nazis, then marched to a firing squad. Back at the Ministry, modern-day Lola dies of radiation poisoning. Salvador and Irene learn the other roaming poisoner is a rogue Ministry agent from another era who's "dead".
24	3	"Tiempo de hechizos (Time of witchcraft)"	Koldo Serra	June 15, 2017	1.44
The poet Gustavo Adolfo Becquer wrote an unchronicled letter about a young witch who appears in three paintings in 1510, 1687, and 1864. Is she time-traveling? Investigating, Amelia and Alonso are bewitched as Pacino risks his life to save the witch and a baby from a Satanic cult. Back at the Ministry, Salvador recruits young Lola as an agent, tasks a suspicious Irene to train her - and it's Lola who cracks the mystery!
25	4	"Tiempo de ilustrados (Time of the Enlightened)"	Jorge Dorado	June 22, 2017	1.55
In 2017, Goya's The Naked Maja is slashed as if by ghosts. The team travels to 1799 to convince Goya to paint it again. Local entanglements arise as a corrupt minister holds an orphanage hostage, Simón Bolívar can't get his girl, and a cult of "Exterminating Angels" spread terror aided by Pacino's former lover Marta. And Velázquez demands to meet the great Goya!
26	5	"Tiempo de esplendor (Time of splendor)"	Oskar Santos	June 29, 2017	1.47
In 1604, King Philip III and England meet to sign a peace treaty, but a poisoner tries to sabotage the peace. Alonso and Pacino hunt the assassin and learn he's an Exterminating Angel. Amelia advises Queen Margaret on womanly politics and chastises Miguel de Cervantes and Lope de Vega for bickering about meeting Shakespeare. Back at the Ministry, Salvador prevents Lola from going on missions, so she absconds with a stack of priceless paintings!
27	6	"Tiempo de esclavos (Time of slaves)"	Ignasi Tarruella	July 6, 2017	1.24
In 1881 (Amelia's time), King Alfonso XII is gunned down by a house slave. The agents detour to Cuba to rescue slaves, and reboot history so the King is never shot. Yet the agents are betrayed, and rescued by Lola, working undercover on secret orders from Salvador. Another cult, the Sons of Padilla, connive to change history. And they have. With her family broken and destitute, Amelia quits the Ministry, in hopes of a someday return.
28	7	"Tiempo de censura (Time of censorship)"	Abigail Schaaff	September 18, 2017	1.55
In 1961, the film Viridiana should be released to international acclaim, but a censor's last-minute switch bans it. Pacino plies the censor with lottery tickets and learns he was bribed by an Exterminating Angel. Irene, who's from this era, visits her estranged family and husband. Back at the Ministry, Lola trains in fighting, learns about 2017, and persuades her elderly daughter(!) to relinquish a complete photocopy of the undamaged Book of Doors.
29	8	"Tiempo de conquista (Time of conquest)"	Koldo Serra	September 25, 2017	1.57
In 1516, in Yucatan, Alonso and Pacino dodge savage Mayans, bloodthirsty Spaniards, and an Exterminating Angel to ensure Gonzalo Guerrero and Gerónimo de Aguilar survive to make history. Alonso also meets his storied grandfather. Back at the Ministry, Marta and the Sons of Padilla threaten agents' families and young orphan Salvador, who's dying. Quick action by Ernesto and Lola - as a nun with a gun - saves Salvador and captures Marta!
30	9	"El cisma del tiempo (The schism of time)"	Miguel Alcantud	October 2, 2017	1.40
In 2017, the Exterminating Angels hold Rabbi Abraham Levi hostage. Using the Kabbalah, he wrote The Book of Doors, and the Angels demand a path to the future. Impossible (or is it?). Levi escapes to 1417, in the castle at Peñiscola, and meets Antipope Benedict XIII, who gets popped to 2017. The time agents work to free Levi and Benedict with the help of the last Knights Templar of 1317. Back at the Ministry, Salvador negotiates with Marta, now branded a traitor with nothing to lose. She demands her father be freed - and he bashes her into a coma!
31	10	"Refugiados por el tiempo (Refugees through time)"	Gabe Ibáñez	October 9, 2017	1.45
In 1828, Alonso and Pacino save Simón Bolívar from an Exterminating Angel (Arteche) who's unkillable. Back home, Moorish refugees from 1609 stumble into 2017 Madrid. Salvador and Irene juggle the refugees and a mad bomber. Ernesto and Lola go to 1609 to convince King Philip III of Spain to rescue the Moors. Elena comes back into Alonso's life, and Marta wakes from her coma with no memory of Pacino!
32	11	"Tiempo de verbena (Time of fair)"	Miguel Alcantud	October 16, 2017	1.29
Angustias attends the 1894 premiere of La verbena de la Paloma, the seminal zarzuela, but finds the show cancelled. Lola and Pacino soothe egos and financing to put the show back on. Back at the Ministry, Alonso interrogates and befriends Arteche the immortal. In exchange for a peaceful death back in Roman times, Arteche reveals the chief Exterminating Angel is posing as the President's liaison to Salvador! Irene gentles Marta to retrieve her memory, but video-viewing her father's assault shocks her.
33	12	"Contratiempos (Setbacks)"	Marcos Castillo	October 25, 2017	0.98
The patrol is sent to 1976 because Adolfo Suárez is not destined to be Prime Minister of Spain. The head Exterminating Angel has abducted Elena to force Alonso to assassinate Suárez, and Pacino shoots Alonso dead. The Angel admits his killers to the Ministry to battle the Sons of Padilla. But Salvador's team subdues the lot with traps and gas, and Alonso is alive to rescue Elena! The time-meddlers' threat is finally over. Meanwhile, Lola's elderly daughter is dying and wishes to know her father's identity, so young Lola visits older Lola for answers. Pacino says farewell as Marta returns to her own era of 1576.
34	13	"Entre dos tiempos (Between two times)"	Miguel Alcantud	November 1, 2017	1.08
A cheesy TV series based on the Ministry's missions is under production in 1966 and threatens to reveal its secrets. Lola, Alonso, and Pacino scotch that effort with bad scripts and swap in Narciso Ibáñez Serrador's Historias para no dormir. But... returning to 2017, they find the Ministry overrun with time tourists! Another meddler with a Book of Doors is making millions. He banishes the heroes to 1350, where a one-eyed Irene leads guerrillas. But the flu is a new plague running rife across timelines. Pacino gets to take part in the Ministry's first and only travel to the future to see Madrid devastated by disease in 2019. The meddler puts things right and all ends well. And Alonso resigns to spend time with Elena. "Sometimes you need to save your own life."

=== Season 4 ===
No. overall	No. in series	Title	Directed by	Original release date	Viewers (millions)
35	1	"Perdido en el tiempo (Lost in time)"	Chiqui Carabante	May 5, 2020	1.57
After three years out of action, Alonso, now father of a child with Elena, is pulled out of retirement by the Ministry and reunited with Pacino and Lola (who are dating each other). The reason? 1940's rising film star Eulogio Romero, who not only is identical to his former patrol partner Julián, who was believed dead, but also part of a plan to make Francisco Franco die 32 years too early.
36	2	"El laberinto del tiempo (The labyrinth of time)"	Marc Vigil	May 12, 2020	1.44
While on his era, Velázquez discovers Philip IV has a new mistress from the future, who turns out to be a former Un, dos, tres... responda otra vez contestant called Carolina. Pacino and Lola travel to 1981 to investigate her. While there, Pacino encounters a childhood friend, who tells him he's going to star in Pedro Almodóvar's next project. But Pacino knows Antonio Banderas was the star of that movie, which launched both his and Almodóvar's careers. Pacino and Lola are ordered to stay in 1981, and they immerse themselves in La Movida Madrileña to make sure Pedro and Antonio meet, but Pacino also learns his friend is gay and terminally ill with AIDS. Meanwhile, Alonso and Irene discover Carolina used an unknown time door and follow her to 1648 to convince her to return to her time, but the mission gets complicated when they discover she's a victim of domestic violence.
37	3	"Bloody Mary Hour"	Catxo López	May 19, 2020	1.15
When the Ministry receives word that Elizabeth I has been murdered before ever being crowned queen, Pacino, Alonso, Irene and Lola travel to England to prevent it and get history back on track. Irene befriends Mary I while the guys go hunting with her husband Philip II and his entourage. Alonso can't help comparing him to the much older Philip they've fought against before (in the season 2 finale). Pacino and Alonso save Elizabeth from poisoning and Mary is finally convinced to not kill her sister. Meanwhile, Amelia reluctantly returns to the Ministry to help Julián regain his memories. After trying several approaches, she manages him to make him remember.
38	4	"La memoria del tiempo (The memory of time)"	Anaïs Pareto	May 26, 2020	1.27
As Velázquez pays a visit to the Museo del Prado in 2020, the Las Meninas painting disappears before his eyes and the Ministry receives word that Pablo Picasso is not working on the Guernica and time is running out. The team travels to 1937, with Julian and Lola going to Madrid, were the paintings were being moved from El Prado due to the Civil War bombings, while Pacino, Irene and Velázquez go to Paris to convince Picasso. The two cases turn out to be connected and the mastermind behind both is an old foe of the Ministry. While in Paris, Irene meets Josephine Baker and Clara Campoamor.
39	5	"Deshaciendo el tiempo (Undoing time)"	Carles Torrens	June 2, 2020	1.29
The patrol has a new mission, but Pacino is ordered to stay because of his emotional turmoil. Irene orders Carolina, now working for the Ministry, to keep an eye on him. Pacino decides to change time to save Lola. He travels two weeks back and succeeds in getting Alonso replace Lola on the previous mission, without realizing Carolina is following him. Lola is saved, but Julián and Alonso are killed instead. Pacino travels back to save them, but they're kidnapped by Díaz Bueno. He realizes Carolina's been trailing him. Back to the present, they find Julián and Alonso are now children, as a result of travelling 30 years into the past on Díaz Bueno's ship (the Anacronópete), without being given the protective Garcia Fluid. Pacino and Carolina travel one month back to neutralize Díaz Bueno. They get him in custody, but he reveals he hid a bomb in the Ministry a while back. The bomb explodes, with Angustias being the only survivor. Pacino wants to try again, but Carolina convinces him to let Lola go. Meanwhile, at home Lola holds a positive pregnancy test. Pacino goes to the past and fixes the timeline. Two weeks before, after kidnapping Lola, the Anacronópete travels to 1945, right in the middle of a World War II's battle.
40	6	"El tiempo vuela (Time flies)"	Chiqui Carabante	June 9, 2020	1.25
After Angustias alerts Salvador that Albert Einstein has been murdered in Madrid in 1923 and his friend Emilio Herrera is under suspicion, the undersecretary takes matters into his own hands, while reminiscing about Herrera's connection to him and his wife.
41	7	"Pretérito imperfecto (Past imperfect)"	Koldo Serra	June 16, 2020	1.25
When king Ferdinand VII seems about to die too early, paving the way for the rise to the throne of his brother Carlos María Isidro, the Ministry hires a down-on-his-luck actor to replace him while they treat the king in the 21st century.
42	8	"Días de futuro pasado (Days of future past)"	Jorge Dorado	June 23, 2020	1.15
The corpse of a child appears near the Ministry's headquarters, and the clues for the murder are scattered across time.

== Special appearances ==
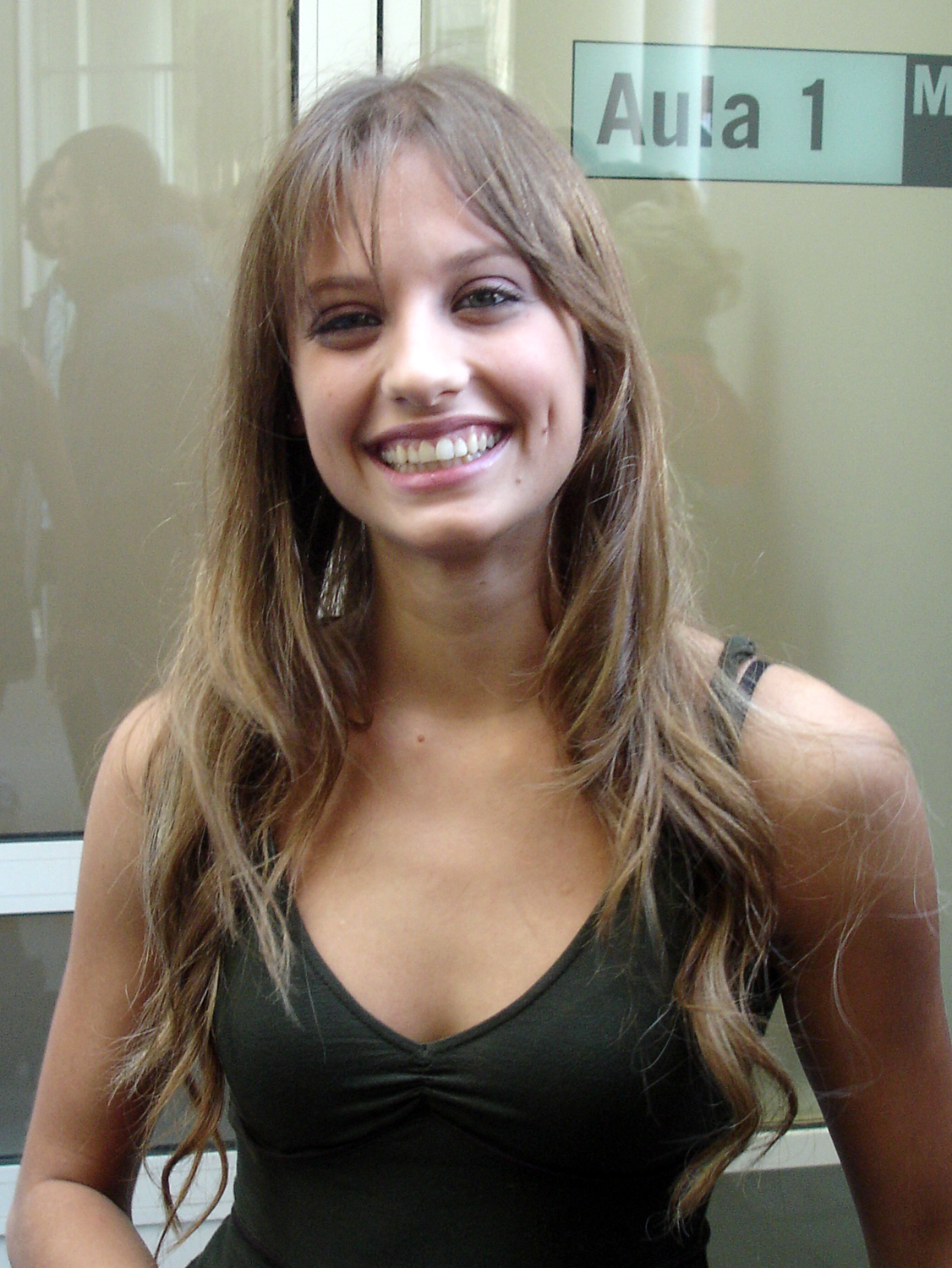
Actress Michelle Jenner reprised the role of Isabella I of Castille she had played in Isabel for a special appearance on El Ministerio del Tiempo.

=== Season 1 ===
==== Episode 1 ====
- Hovik Keuchkerian as Juan Martín Díez "El Empecinado"
- Josep Linuesa as Thibaud
- Iván Villanueva as Benito

==== Episode 2 ====
- Víctor Clavijo as Lope de Vega
- Miguel Rellán as Gil Pérez
- Miguel Ángel Somé as Alonso de Entrerríos, Jr. (Alonso's son)

==== Episode 3 ====
- David Luque as Heinrich Himmler
- Pep Miràs as Francisco Franco
- Miko Jarry as Adolf Hitler
- Frank Feys as Heinrich Müller
- Markus Lambauer as Captain Schweinsteiger
- Pep Sais as Antoni Maria Marcet i Poal, abbot of Montserrat
- Jorge Pobes as Luis Orcajo
- Julio Arrojo as Ángel

==== Episode 4 ====
- Michelle Jenner as Isabella of Castile
- Juan Gea as Tomás de Torquemada
- Eusebio Poncela as Francisco Jiménez de Cisneros
- Paco Obregón as Rabbi Abraham Levi
- Carlos Álvarez-Nóvoa as Don Manuel López Castillejo
- Ben Temple as Aaron Stein
- Aitor Mazo as the Inquisition prosecutor

==== Episode 5 ====
- Raúl Pulido as Pablo Picasso
- Roberto Álvarez as Julián's father
- Vicente Gil as Fernando Jiménez del Oso

==== Episode 6 ====
- Juan Blanco as Lázaro de Tormes
- Alberto Amarilla as Fray Juan
- Francesc Orella as Alberto Díaz Bueno

==== Episode 7 ====
- María Cotiello as Nuria Celaya (Irene's wife)
- Carmen Sánchez Lozano as Isabella II
- Carmen Gutiérrez as Maria Christina of the Two Sicilies
- Celine Peña as Infanta Luisa Fernanda
- Manolo Solo as Undersecretary Emilio Redón

==== Episode 8 ====
- Ángel Ruiz as Federico García Lorca
- Enrique Alcides as Salvador Dalí
- Jordi Coll as Luis Buñuel
- Antonio Alcalde as Pepín Bello
- Secun de la Rosa as Antonio Lancha
- Iria del Río as Silvia (Amelia's granddaughter)
- Mar del Hoyo as Rosita Díaz Gimeno
- Jordi Hurtado as himself

=== Season 2 ===
==== Episode 9 ====
- Antonio Velázquez as Rodrigo Díaz de Vivar "El Cid"
- Sergio Peris-Mencheta as Rogelio Buendía / Imposter Cid
- Savitri Ceballos as Jimena Díaz
- Luis G. Gámez as Ramón Menéndez Pidal
- Pablo Scola as Charlton Heston
- Vincente Colomar as Blas de Lezo

==== Episode 10 ====
- Andrés Gertrúdix as Francisco Morán
- Santiago Meléndez as Pacino's father
- Antonio Reyes as Morán's father
- Ximena Vera as Morán's mother
- Carmela Lloret and Eva Llorach as two of Morán's victims

==== Episode 11 ====
- Pere Ponce as Miguel de Cervantes
- Víctor Clavijo's second appearance as Lope de Vega
- Jimmy Shaw as Lord Charles York/Walcott
- Markos Marín as John Bennet
- Miguel Rellán's second appearance as Gil Pérez

==== Episode 12 ====
- Fernando Cayo as Napoleon Bonaparte
- Ismael Martínez as Rodolfo Suárez
- Jordi Martínez as Michel Ney
- Nadia de Santiago as Rosa del Amo
- Selica Torcal as Sor Flora
- Aránzazu Zorate as Sor Paula
- Sonia Almarcha as Sor Antonia

==== Episode 13 ====
- Elena Furiase as Micaela Amaya
- José Luis Torrijo as Doctor Vargas
- José Ramón Iglesias as Germán
- Tania Vilamarín as María Pita
- Joaquín Gómez as Germán's father
- Jaime Zatarain as Ramón de la Vega
- Pepe Zafra as young Velázquez
- Guillermo Vallverdú as Mariano
- Javier Laorden as Pepe
- Juan Carlos Villanueva as Gregorio Marañón
- José Luis Patiño as Francisco Pacheco
- Sergi Méndez as young Alonso de Entrerríos
- Nicole Valle as young Blanca

==== Episode 14 ====
- Miki Esparbé as Joaquín María Argamasilla
- Gary Piquer as Harry Houdini
- Rick Zingale as L. Gromek
- Mari Carmen Sánchez as Josefa
- Miguel Hermoso Arnao as J. Edgar Hoover
- Juan Carlos Sánchez as Ramón del Valle-Inclán
- Juan Antonio Quintana as Santiago Ramón y Cajal
- Pedro Miguel Martínez as Joaquín José Javier Argamasilla

==== Episodes 15/16 ====
- Pedro Alonso as Saturnino Martín Cerezo
- Paco Marín as Rogelio Vigil de Quiñones
- Aitor Merino as Antonio Sanchez Menache
- Jordi Vilches as José Lafarga Abad
- Joan Carles Suau as Miguel
- Borja Maestre as Heredia
- Alberto Jiménez as Enrique de las Morenas y Fossi
- Juan José Ballesta as Vicente González Toca
- Nacho Sánchez as Rafael Ríos
- Andrey Finanta as Alejo
- Vanessa Castro as Maria
- Pastora Vega as Pacino's mother
- Mónica Estarreado as Asunción
- Santiago Meléndez as Luis Méndez (Pacino's father)

==== Episode 17 ====
- Fernando Conde as Philip V of Spain
- María Álvarez as Elisabeth Farnese
- Algis Arlauskas as Ferguson

==== Episode 18 ====
- Carlos Cuevas as Javier
- Mario Tardón as Dr. Madrigal
- Arnau García as young Salvador Martí
- Alexandra Jiménez as Teresa Méndez / Julia Lozano
- Rosa Vivas as Salvador's adoptive mother

==== Episode 19 ====
- Roberto Drago as Sebastián Lombardi
- Anna Castillo as Sonia Lombardi
- Joan Carreras as Christopher Columbus

==== Episode 20 ====
- Nancho Novo as Don Fadrique de Villaespesa
- Alba Ribas as Constanza
- Chusa Barbero as Claudia
- Raúl Cimas as Isaac Vila
- Richard Sahagún as Alberto Ortigosa
- Garbiñe Insausti as Natalia Vila
- Maitane San Nicolás as Rocio
- Patrick Criado as Sancho
- Félix Arkarazo as Ernest Hemingway
- Javier Mula as Saavedra
- Pepe Rodríguez as himself

==== Episode 21 ====
- Carlos Hipólito as Philip II of Spain
- Carlos Kaniowsky as Mateo Vázquez de Leca
- Víctor Duplá as Agustín Argüelles
- Jon Ariño as De las Cuevas
- Carlos Cuevas as Javier
- Maitane San Nicolás as Rocio
- Marta Nieto as Isabella of Portugal
- Jordi Hurtado as himself

=== Season 3 ===
==== Episode 22 ====
- José Ángel Egido as Alfred Hitchcock
- Pierre Kiwitt as Petrov
- Óscar de la Fuente as Francisco Morales
- Julia Fossi as Alma Reville
- Rafa Delgado as waiter

==== Episode 23 ====
- José Manuel Poga as William Martin
- Antonio Dechent as Mr. Naylor
- Cuca Escribano as Mrs. Naylor
- Christian Stamm as Sgt. Sommer
- Mark Schardan as Ewen Montagu
- Mikel Tello as Azcárate
- Miko Jarry's second appearance as Adolf Hitler

==== Episode 24 ====
- Tamar Novas as Gustavo Adolfo Bécquer
- Miryam Gallego as Mencía
- Marta Guerras as Juana
- José Luis Ferrer as Faustino
- Adelfa Calvo as Aurelia
- Joan Arias as Damián
- Jorge San José as Valero
- Teresa Almeda as Agustina

==== Episode 25 ====
- Pedro Casablanc as Francisco de Goya
- María Adánez as María Josefa Pimentel, Duchess of Osuna
- Luis Callejo as Manuel Godoy
- Raquel Pérez as María Teresa del Toro
- Eva Marciel as Pepita Tudó
- Itzan Escamilla as young Simón Bolívar
- Noemí Ruiz as María "Cayetana" de Silva, 13th Duchess of Alba

==== Episode 26 ====
- Fernando Guillén Cuervo as Francisco Gómez de Sandoval y Rojas, 1st Duke of Lerma
- Elena Rivera as Margaret of Austria, Queen of Spain
- Scott Cleverdon as Charles Howard
- Tacho González as Anthony Peel
- Federico Aguado as Felipe III of Spain
- Óscar de la Fuente as Francisco Morales
- Rafa Martín as Francisco Martínez Motiño
- Mariano Venancio as Azpilicueta
- Rocío Madrid as Encarna
- Paco Hidalgo as Carrasco
- Nick Devlin as William Shakespeare
- Pere Ponce as Miguel de Cervantes

==== Episode 27 ====
- Lluís Soler as Père Folch (Amelia's uncle)
- Chete Lera as Antonio López, 1st Marquess of Comillas
- Guillermo Barrientos as Alfonso XII of Spain
- Gal Soler as Práxedes Mateo Sagasta
- Nacho Marraco as Doctor Morales
- Llorenç González as Eusebi Güell
- Carlos Villarino as young Antonio López, 1st Marquess of Comillas
- César Vea as overseer
- Mario Makón as Tomasín
- Tamara Ndong as Tomasín's mother

==== Episode 28 ====
- Pep Tosar as Luis Buñuel
- Carlos Areces as Ambrosio Pitaluga
- Luis Rallo as Domingo Dominguín
- Miguel Ángel Jenner as Alberto Larra
- Carolina Vázquez as María Asunción Girón
- Juan Carlos Gustems as José María Muñoz Fontán
- Enrique Asenjo as Juan Antonio Bardem
- Alfonso Begara as Francisco Rabal
- Michel Herráiz as young Jesús Méndez Pontón
- Songa Park as Olivia
- Andrea López as Sandrita

==== Episode 29 ====
- Miguel Ángel Muñoz as Gonzalo Guerrero
- Jorge Suquet as Gerónimo de Aguilar
- Paco Manzanedo as Gaspar de Entrerríos (Alonso's grandfather)
- Josep Julien as fake Bernal Díaz del Castillo
- Marco Tulio as Andrés Román
- Jan Fresneda as young Alonso de Entrerríos
- Valentín Garcés as young Salvador Martí / Salvador Roa

==== Episode 30 ====
- Paco Obregón as Abraham Levi
- Francesc Corbera as Ginés Morcillo
- Jorge Kent as Master of the Knights Templar
- Fernando Díaz as Hugo de Claramonte
- José Luis Matienzo as Simón Cascajosa
- Jaime Pujol as Adolfo Suárez
- Rodrigo Sáenz de Heredia as young Salvador Martí / Salvador Roa
- Gerardo Malla as Antipope Benedict XIII «Papa Luna»
- Michel Herráiz as young Jesús Méndez Pontón
- Andrea López as Sandrita
- Federico Aguado as Felipe III of Spain

==== Episode 31 ====
- Juan Pablo Shuk as Simón Bolívar
- Said El Mouden as Habib
- Agus Ruiz as Arteche
- Inma Lloret as Manuela Sáenz
- Guido Balzaretti as Cosme
- Ramiro Blas as Rafael Urdaneta
- Elena Rivera as Margaret of Austria, Queen of Spain

==== Episode 32 ====
- Bruno Oro as Tomás Bretón
- Manuel Galiana as José Mesejo
- Eva Manjón as Luisa Campos
- Fernando Albizu as Arregui
- Pepa Charro as Leocadia Alba
- José Troncoso as Emilio Mesejo
- Norma Ruiz as Irene Alba
- Jorge Basanta as Benito Pérez Galdós
- Manuel Brun as Ricardo de la Vega
- Pedro García de las Heras as José Echegaray
- Agus Ruiz as Arteche

==== Episode 33 ====
- Pablo Viña as Usher
- Sebastián Haro as Torcuato Fernández-Miranda
- Toni Medina as leader of the Ángel Exterminador
- Pablo Menasanch as leader of the Comunero
- Jaime Pujol as Adolfo Suárez

==== Episode 34 ====
- Luis Larrodera as Leopoldo Ureña
- Sergio Villanueva as Narciso "Chicho" Ibáñez Serrador
- Txema Blasco as Juan Ureña
- Mariano Llorente as Jesús Aparicio-Bernal
- Arturo Querejeta as Director
- Raúl Mérida as Jaime Blanch
- Juan Renedo as Fernando Guillén
- Ruth Santamaría as Gemma Cuervo

=== Season 4 ===
==== Episode 35 ====
- Pep Mirás as Francisco Franco
- Koldo Olabarri as Luis García Berlanga
- Belén Ponce de León as Carmen Polo
- Luichi Macías as Ministry's Agent of 1943
- Olga Rodríguez as Wife of the productor of Amor y Patria
- Rafael Calatayud as Javier Zurrilla
- Carolina García as Ana Quijada

==== Episode 36 ====
- Edu Soto as Felipe IV de España and Fabio McNamara
- Carlos Santos as Pedro Almodóvar
- Raúl Prieto as Ángel Fuensanta Carrasco
- Vito Sanz as Eduardo Robles Prieto
- Claudio Portalo as Antonio Banderas
- Eduardo Antuña as Porter
- Palmira Ferrer as neighbour of Carolina

==== Episode 37 ====
- Jorge Clemente as young Felipe II of Spain
- Rachel Lascar as Mary I of England
- Jesús Noguero as Fernando Álvarez de Toledo y Pimentel, III duke of Alba
- Ramón Esquinas as Count of Egmont
- Rafael Núñez as Padre Bartolomé Carranza
- Rosa Blake as Elizabeth I of England
- Julius Cotter as Sir Henry Bedingfeld
- Robert Crumpton as Lord Arthur
- Pere Costa as Amelia's employee 1885

==== Episode 38 ====
- Francesc Orella as Alberto Díaz Bueno
- Zenet as Pablo Picasso
- María Morales as Clara Campoamor
- Claudio Villarubia as Braulio
- Lydia López as Agustina
- Stéphanie Magnin as Dora Maar
- Annick Weerts as Marie-Thérèse Walter
- Astrid Jones as Joséphine Baker

==== Episode 39 ====
- Jan Fresneda as Alonso de Entrerríos (child)
- Asier Flores as Julián Martínez (child)
- David García as Psychiatrist

==== Episode 40 ====
- Vicente Romero as Emilio Herrera
- Lola Casamayor as María Sofía Beltrán Ruiz
- Rodrigo Sáenz de Heredia as young Salvador Martí / Salvador Roa
- Beatriz Arjona as young María Sofía Beltrán Ruiz
- Thomas Sauerteig as Albert Einstein
- Paco Lahoz as Baldovinos
- Juan Vinuesa as Gerardo
- Fran Calvo as Emilio Herrera (father)
- Raúl Escobar as Ignacio María Ayerbe de la Fuente Giménez-Salgado
- Quim Ramos as Arturo
- Oti Manzano as Irene Aguilera

==== Episode 41 ====
- Juan Codina as Doctor Pedro Castelló
- Juanjo Cucalón as himself and Fernando VII de España
- Camila Viyuela as María Cristina de Borbón-Two Sicilies
- Álex O'Dogherty as Carlos María Isidro de Borbón
- Fernando Sansegundo as Francisco Tadeo Calomarde
- Victoria Dal Vera as Doctor

==== Episode 42 ====
- Anna Cortés as Iria Martínez
- Fiorella Faltoyano as Dolores "Lola" Mendieta (old)
- Marta Milans as Inspectora Carmen Ayala

== Awards ==
The series won the 2015 Ondas Award for Best Spanish Series. In 2017 it won at Premios Feroz the awards for best drama series, best lead actress (Aura Garrido) and best supporting actor for a television series (Hugo Silva, tied with Velvet's José Sacristán).

Year	Award	Category	Nominee(s)	Result	Ref.
2016	4th MiM Series Awards	Best Drama Series		Nominated	
2016	4th MiM Series Awards	Best Direction		Nominated	
2016	4th MiM Series Awards	Best Screenplay		Won	
2016	4th MiM Series Awards	Best Drama Actor	Hugo Silva	Nominated	
2017	4th Feroz Awards	Best Drama Series		Won	
2017	4th Feroz Awards	Best Lead Actress (TV)	Aura Garrido	Won	
2017	4th Feroz Awards	Best Lead Actor (TV)	Nacho Fresneda	Nominated	
2017	4th Feroz Awards	Best Lead Actor (TV)	Rodolfo Sancho	Nominated	
2017	4th Feroz Awards	Best Supporting Actor (TV)	Hugo Silva (ex aequo with José Sacristán)	Won	
2017	4th Feroz Awards	Best Supporting Actor (TV)	Julián Villagrán	Nominated	
2017	4th Feroz Awards	Best Supporting Actor (TV)	Jaime Blanch	Nominated	
2017	4th Feroz Awards	Best Supporting Actress (TV)	Cayetana Guillén Cuervo	Nominated	
2017	5th MiM Series Awards	Best Drama Actor	Nacho Fresneda	Nominated	
2018	5th Feroz Awards	Best Drama Series		Nominated	
2018	5th Feroz Awards	Best Lead Actor (TV)	Hugo Silva	Nominated	
2018	5th Feroz Awards	Best Lead Actress (TV)	Aura Garrido	Nominated	
2018	5th Feroz Awards	Best Supporting Actress (TV)	Cayetana Guillén Cuervo	Nominated	
2018	5th Feroz Awards	Best Supporting Actor (TV)	Jaime Blanch	Nominated	
2018	5th Platino Awards	Best Miniseries or TV series	El Ministerio del Tiempo	Won	
2018	5th Platino Awards	Best Actress in a Miniseries or TV series	Aura Garrido	Nominated	
2021	8th Feroz Awards	Best Drama Series		Nominated	
2021	22nd Iris Awards	Best Fiction		Won	
2021	22nd Iris Awards	Best Actor	Jaime Blanch	Won	
2021	22nd Iris Awards	Best Screenplay	El ministerio del tiempo's writing team	Won	
2021	22nd Iris Awards	Best Production	María Roy, Alicia Yubero, Marc Vigil & Javier Olivares	Won	

== International adaptations ==
A Portuguese language adaptation entitled Ministério do Tempo was produced by Iniziomedia. The format has also been sold to China, with negotiations mentioned for Germany, France, Italy and US. An adaptation of the series was shot in Ukraine, but has not been released.

== Disputes ==
=== Timeless lawsuit ===
On 27 September 2016 Onza Partners presented a lawsuit to the CDCA against Sony Pictures, NBCUniversal, and executive producers Shawn Ryan, Eric Kripke and John Davis for copyright infringement and breach of implied contract, claiming that the U.S. TV series Timeless is a copy of El Ministerio del Tiempo.

The defendants responded to the suit in a November 23, 2016 filing, contending that shows about time travel are an established television genre, and that similarities between the two shows are generic, and largely based on the notion that the main characters will travel in time to effect some kind of change. A request to dismiss Onza's lawsuit by Sony was denied on February 15, 2017, but the two parties ultimately came to an agreement and jointly moved to dismiss.

=== The Ministry of Time ===
In February 2024, the BBC commissioned the series The Ministry of Time, an adaptation of Kaliane Bradley's then unpublished debut novel of the same name. Fans raised suspicions of plagiarism, backed by series creator Javier Olivares himself. RTVE stated its intention to "request explanations from the BBC about the announcement it made without prejudice to the rights it has in the defense of its interests".

The novel's author Kaliane Bradley responded on social media, stating her novel was an original work of fiction based around Franklin's lost expedition (having been inspired by the AMC series The Terror), and that she had never seen the Spanish series in question.

== See also ==
- Quantum Leap
- Timeless
- Time travel in fiction
- Time travel
- Novikov self-consistency principle
- Grandfather paradox
- Valérian and Laureline
- Timecop
- The Corridors of Time
- The Time Tunnel
- Doctor Who
- Timeslip
- Into the Labyrinth (TV series)
- Outlander (TV series)
- Primeval (TV series)
- Goodnight Sweetheart (TV series)
