= Baler (film) =

- Directed by: Mark Meily
- Written by: Roy Iglesias
- Produced by: Vicente Del Rosario III; Veronique Del Rosario
- Starring: Anne Curtis; Jericho Rosales; Phillip Salvador
- Cinematography: Lee Meily
- Edited by: Danny Añonuevo
- Music by: Vincent de Jesus
- Production companies: VIVA Films; BIDA Foundation
- Distributed by: VIVA Films
- Release date: December 25, 2008
- Running time: 116 minutes
- Country: Philippines
- Language: Filipino
- Budget: ₱100,000,000.00
- Box office: ₱37,000,000.00

Baler is a 2008 romantic war film and the official entry of VIVA Films in the 2008 Metro Manila Film Festival, starring Anne Curtis and Jericho Rosales. Its first screening was on December 25, 2008, simultaneously with the rest of the 2008 Metro Manila Film Festival film entries.

== Plot ==
During the Philippine Revolution, Celso Resurrección, a Spanish mestizo, falls in love with Feliza Reyes, the daughter of a Katipunero. Celso joins the Spanish Army in the hopes of being sent to Spain after the war to search for his father. Celso's garrison in Baler, led by Captain Enrique de las Morenas y Fossí is isolated and unaware they had lost the Spanish–American War. Later, Filipino troops attack the garrison and the Spaniards take shelter in the church. They are joined by the town priest, Candido Gómez Carreño. Gabriel, Feliza's brother, joins Padre Gomez as his sacristan, to his father Daniel's disappointment. Celso recognizes Gabriel and urges him to leave, but Gabriel says that his Christian duty is to stay and help Gomez and believes that his presence would deter the Filipinos from storming the church. The Spaniards allow him to stay but tell him he can leave if he chooses to.

Over the coming weeks, several attempts are made by the Filipinos to get the Spaniards to surrender, promising them safe conduct. As months pass, the hot climate spoils their food supply, and the soldiers risk getting shot at when they forage at night for fruits, berries and various herbs. One night, Morenas orders Celso and another soldier on a foray to burn nearby houses to distract the Filipinos and show them that their spirits are not broken. Celso takes this opportunity to see Feliza, who hands him food from the town fiesta held earlier that day in the town square as a ploy to entice the Spaniards to give up.

The Filipina women complain to their leaders that they have not heard mass in months. Succumbing to pressure, the Filipinos convince the Spaniards to agree to an hour-long truce to allow Padre Gomez to say mass outside the church. But weakened from the deteriorating conditions inside the church, Padre Gomez dies before the mass is finished, and the truce ends as soldiers bring him back inside. At this point, Gabriel is finally convinced to leave the church. His family rushes to greet him, while Daniel breaks down and embraces him.

A ceasefire is held on Christmas. On Christmas Eve, a carabao is spotted in front of the church door, which the Spaniards take in for food. However, they are decimated by disease. Morenas succumbs to beriberi and is succeeded by Lt. Saturnino Martín Cerezo. To convince them that the war is over, the Filipinos leave newspapers on the church steps which report Spain's defeat. Spanish nationals also unsuccessfully try to convince Martin. Martín's soldiers remain loyal to him, despite their dire situation.

One night, the Spaniards hear gunshots from outside and celebrate, unaware that the Philippine–American War has broken out and the Americans are trying to invade. However, their hopes are shattered when the Filipinos beat back the Americans. As morale weakens, a few soldiers plan to escape, including Celso, who learns that Feliza was pregnant but is unaware that she has given birth to a son who she names Celso. On the night of the desertion, six soldiers — including Celso — desert their posts while everyone is asleep. The sound of the doorlatch opening awakens Martin, who catches Celso and Mauro (one of the indios serving in the garrison) about to escape. Terrified, Mauro accuses Celso of aiding the desertion of the other soldier. Celso is shot by Mauro on Martin's orders.

That evening, Martín reads an article concerning a close friend's posting, plans of which only he knew, which convinces him the newspapers are genuine and that Spain had in fact lost the war. The next day, he assembles his men and informs them of the truth. Martín and his troops surrender to the Filipinos, to great rejoicing. As Martín formally signs the surrender papers, Feliza scans the soldiers' faces, but fails to see Celso. She runs inside the church and finds his body in the baptistry, sending her in mourning.

A few years later, Feliza is shown raising Celso Jr., while an American soldier compliments him.

== Release ==
Baler has been available on original CD and DVD since March 17, 2009. The film had a special screening at the 2nd San Joaquin International Film Festival, on May 19, 2009, in Stockton, California.

== Cast ==
- Anne Curtis as Feliza Reyes
- Jericho Rosales as Celso Resurrección
- Phillip Salvador as Daniel Reyes
- Andrew Schimmer as Lt. José Mota
- Baron Geisler as Captain Enrique de las Morenas y Fossí
- Ryan Eigenmann as 2nd Lt. Saturnino Martín Cerezo
- Carlo Aquino as Gabriel Reyes
- Nikki Bacolod as Luming
- Mark Bautista as Lope Balbuena
- Joe Goodall as American Soldier
- Jeremiah Rosales as Jaime Caldenay
- Lindley Lumantas as Ilong
- Joel Torre as Commandante Teodorico Luna Novicio
- Alvin Anson as Catalán
- Mark Lagang as Alom
- Michael de Mesa as Fr. Candido Gómez Carreno
- Rio Locsin as Azón Reyes
- John Richards as American Captain
- Johnny Solomon as Emilio Aguinaldo
- DJ Durano as Pablo/Ambo
- Leo Martinez as Col. Calixto Villacorte
- Bernard Palanca as Lt. Juan Alonzo Zayas
- Miguel Gonzales as Celso Reyes Resurreción, Jr.
- Jao Mapa as Mauro
- Mikel Campos as Flag Bearer
- Spyke Perez
- Vince Edwards
- Billy Ray Afable
- Alan Pérez
- Allen Dizon as Lt. Col. Simón Tecson (uncredited)
- Marc Vautrin as Spanish Soldier (uncredited)

== Awards ==
2008 Metro Manila Film Festival

Category	Subject	Result
Best Picture	Baler	Won
Best Actress	Anne Curtis	Won
Best Supporting Actor	Phillip Salvador	Won
Best Director	Mark Meily	Won
Best Screenplay	Roy Iglesias	Won
Best Cinematography	Lee Meily	Won
Best Production Design	Aped Santos	Won
Best Editing	Danny Añonuevo	Won
Most Gender-Sensitive Film	Baler	Won
Gatpuno Antonio J. Villegas Cultural Awards	Baler	Won

2009 Gawad Genio Awards

Category	Subject	
Best Film	VIVA Films	Won
Best Film Director	Mark Meily	Won
Best Actress	Anne Curtis	Nominated
Best Actor	Jericho Rosales	Nominated
Best Film Supporting Actor	Phillip Salvador	Nominated
Best Film Cinematographer	Lee Meily	Won
Best Film Editor	Danny Añonuevo	Won
Best Film Production Designer	Aped Santos	Won
Best Film Screenwriter	Roy Iglesias	Won
Best Film Sound Engineer	Ditoy Aguila	Won
Best Film Soundtrack	Ngayon, Bukas at Kailanman By: Sarah Geronimo	Won
Best Film Story	Roy Iglesias	Won
Outstanding Genio Awardee	VIVA Films	Won

2009 FAMAS Awards

Category	Subject	Result
Best Picture	Baler	Won
Best Director	Mark Meily	Nominated
Best Actor	Jericho Rosales	Nominated
Best Actress	Anne Curtis	Nominated
Best Supporting Actor	Phillip Salvador	Nominated
Best Child Actor	Fender de leon Legaspi	Nominated
Best Screenplay	Roy Iglesias	Nominated
Best Cinematography	Lee Meily	Won
Best Art Direction	Aped Santos	Won
Best Sound	Ditoy Aguila	Won
Best Editing	Danny Añonuevo	Won
Best Story	Roy Iglesias	Won
Best Theme Song	Ngayon Bukas at Magpakailanman by: Sarah Geronimo and Louie Ocampo (composer)	Won
Best Musical Score	Vincent de Jesus	Nominated

2009 FAP Awards

Category	Subject	Result
Best Picture	Baler	Won
Best Director	Mark Meily	Won
Best Actor	Jericho Rosales	Nominated
Best Actress	Anne Curtis	Nominated
Best Supporting Actor	Phillip Salvador	Won
Best Screenplay	Roy Iglesias	Won
Best Cinematography	Lee Meily	Won
Best Sound	Ditoy Aguila	Won
Best Production Design	Aped Santos	Won
Best Musical Score	Vincent de Jesus	Won

== Controversy ==
On February 25, 2013, Ombudsman Conchita Carpio-Morales ordered the indictment of former Philippine Amusement and Gaming Corporation (PAGCOR) chairman Efraim Genuino, his son Erwin, and six other officials of the state-run gaming firm for malversation and graft charges in connection to a multimillion-peso deal for Baler.

== See also ==
- Last Stand in the Philippines – 1945 Spanish film
- 1898, Our Last Men in the Philippines – 2016 Spanish film

Awards and achievements
Preceded by Resiklo	Metro Manila Film Festival Award for Best Picture; 2008	Succeeded by Ang Panday
