= Siege of Baler =

1899 rebel siege of Spanish outpost during the Philippine Revolution

Coordinates: 15.7591°N 121.5622°E

- Part of the Philippine Revolution
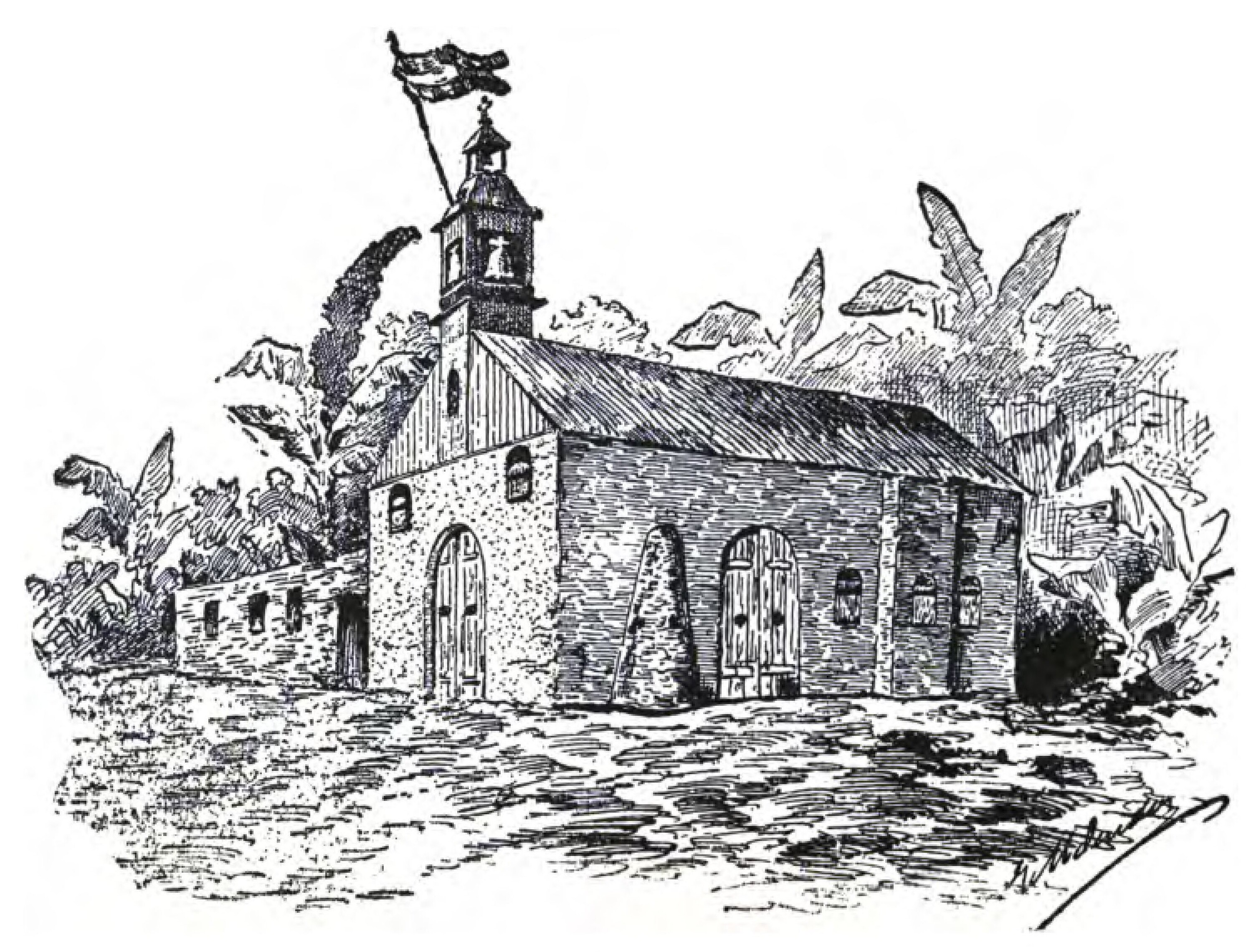
- The church during the siege
| Date | 1 July 1898 – 2 June 1899 (11 months and 1 day) |
| Location | Baler, Philippines |
| Result | Filipino victory |

Belligerents
| Philippines | Spain |

Commanders and leaders
| Teodorico Luna; Calixto Villacorta; Cirilo Gómez †; Simón Tecson | Enrique de las Morenas †; Juan Alonso Zayas †; Saturnino Cerezo |

Strength
| 800 | 54 |

Casualties and losses
| 700 dead and wounded | 2 killed 16 wounded 14 died of disease 2 executed |

The Siege of Baler (Filipino: Pagkubkob sa Baler; Spanish: Sitio de Baler) was a battle of the Philippine Revolution. Filipino revolutionaries laid siege to a fortified church defended by Spanish troops in the town of Baler in the district of El Principe, Nueva Ecija (present-day part of Aurora), for 337 days, from 1 July 1898 until 2 June 1899. The Spanish–American War had ended with the Treaty of Paris on 10 December 1898, with Spain's surrender and cession of claims over the Philippines to the United States. Cut off from communications with their own government and military, the Spanish forces in Baler continued their defense against the Filipino forces until 1899.

== Background ==
Baler is located on the eastern coast of Luzon, about 225 kilometres (140 mi) from Manila. The Philippine Revolution against Spanish colonial rule started in 1896. In September 1897, the Spanish garrisoned Baler with 50 Civil Guard soldiers under Lieutenant José Mota, to prevent Emilio Aguinaldo from receiving smuggled arms. Mota's forces were attacked on the night of 4 October by Novicio's men, killing Mota and six other Spaniards, wounding several and capturing 30 Mauser Model 1893 rifles. The initial phase of the revolution ended with the Pact of Biak-na-Bato in 1897. By 1898, with the resumption of the Philippine Revolution, Baler was still reachable only by ship or by traversing on foot through nearly impassable jungle trails across the Sierra Madre mountain range that were often washed out by torrential tropical rains.

During this phase of the revolution, the Philippines was involved in the Spanish–American War, and the Filipino rebels allied themselves with the American forces. This alliance would end with the outbreak of the Philippine–American War in 1899. Baler was garrisoned by a 50-man detachment of the 2nd Expeditionary Battalion Cazadores of the Civil Guard, led by Captain Enrique de las Morenas and three other officers; de las Morenas was serving as the district political-military governor. On 1 June 1898, las Morenas ordered his men to begin digging a well, stocking food supplies and ammunition, and fortifying the church compound of San Luís de Tolosa in Baler's town square against a possible attack. The church was the only stone building in the area.

== Siege ==
On 26 June 1898, it was noticed that the town residents were leaving. The city was surrounded the next day. Then on the night of 30 June, 800 Filipino troops under Teodorico Novicio Luna attacked, and the garrison fell back to the church. The town priest, Candido Gómez Carreño, also quartered himself in the church. The first few days of the siege saw several attempts by the Filipinos to get the Spanish to surrender by leaving letters, while they surrounded the church with trenches. On 8 July, the revolutionary commander, Cirilo Gómez Ortiz, offered a suspension of hostilities until nightfall, which was accepted. On 18 July, Calixto Villacorta took command of the Filipinos. He also sent a warning letter, which was rebuffed.

The Spanish had to endure confinement in a small, hot, humid space. As the siege progressed, their food supply began to diminish through usage and spoilage. Enemy rifle fire did cause casualties but diseases such as beriberi, dysentery, and fevers did more damage. The first Spaniard to die was Gómez Carreño. In September, Lieutenant Alonso was killed; in November, Captain Las Morenas succumbed to beriberi and command fell to Lieutenant Saturnino Martín Cerezo. More than once the Spanish made forays to burn nearby houses to deprive the Filipinos of much needed cover. The Filipinos attempted to smoke them out by setting fires beside the church wall but were repulsed and had their timber captured. At the start of the siege, the Spanish had provisions of flour, rice, beans, chickpeas, bacon, canned Australian beef, sardines, wine, sugar, and coffee – but no salt. Supplementing their food supplies, the Spanish foraged for pumpkins, pumpkin leaves, oranges, plantain shoots, various herbs, and planted a garden of peppers, tomatoes and pumpkins.

By mid-November, having failed to dislodge the Spanish defenders, Villacorta, under a flag of truce, left newspapers on the church steps that told of Spain's planned departure from the Philippines and that the Spanish–American War was over. Martín Cerezo considered this a ruse de guerre. Villacorta brought in Spanish civilians and ultimately a military officer left behind to wrap up Spain's affairs on the island, to no avail. By 22 November, a total of 145 days had elapsed since the siege began, during which 14 Spanish defenders died of disease. Of the 40 remaining men, only 23 were combat effective, with the rest being sick. The Filipinos also had suffered casualties, mostly from rifle fire the Spanish were able to inflict on them from their protected firing positions. Gómez Ortiz was one of these. The new year brought more Spanish emissaries to Baler, but again Martín Cerezo turned them away. At the end of February, the Spanish killed three water buffaloes, eating the meat before it spoiled, and using the leather for footwear.

The Treaty of Paris formally ending their war with Spain having been signed in December, and after a specific request from the Archbishop of Manila on March 23, the Americans intervened in April. Commander Charles Stillman Sperry, commanding the gunboat USS Yorktown, anchored in Baler Bay on April 11, coincidentally the date the exchange of treaty ratifications passed sovereignty of Philippines from Spain to the U.S. By this time, Filipino rebels had declared independence and had been fighting the United States for two months. Five Americans on a reconnaissance mission were killed. Lieutenant James Clarkson Gilmore and nine others were captured, and held prisoner by the Filipinos until rescued in December. When their food ran out on 24 April, the Spanish resorted to eating stray dogs, cats, reptiles, snails and crows.

On 8 May, Filipino artillery shelling hit an improvised cell that held three Spaniards who had attempted to desert earlier in the siege. One of them, Alcaide Bayona, ran out and joined the Filipinos. This was a blow to the Spanish as the deserter had important intelligence to share about their dire straits, and helped fire the cannon on the church to good effect. In May, 1899, Emilio Aguinaldo assigned Colonel Simón Tecson y Ocampo to lead the siege of Spanish troops with Filipino troops at San Luis Obispo de Tolosa Church. On 28 May 1899, there was yet another attempt to get Martín Cerezo to surrender. Again, another Spanish officer, Lieutenant Colonel Cristóbal Aguilar y Castañeda, appeared under a flag of truce and was turned away. He had brought recent Spanish newspapers, which Cerezo initially dismissed as bogus, until Martín Cerezo read an article concerning a close friend's posting, plans of which only he knew, convincing him the newspapers were genuine and that indeed Spain had lost the war. On 2 June, Martín Cerezo surrendered to the Filipinos.

== Aftermath and legacy ==
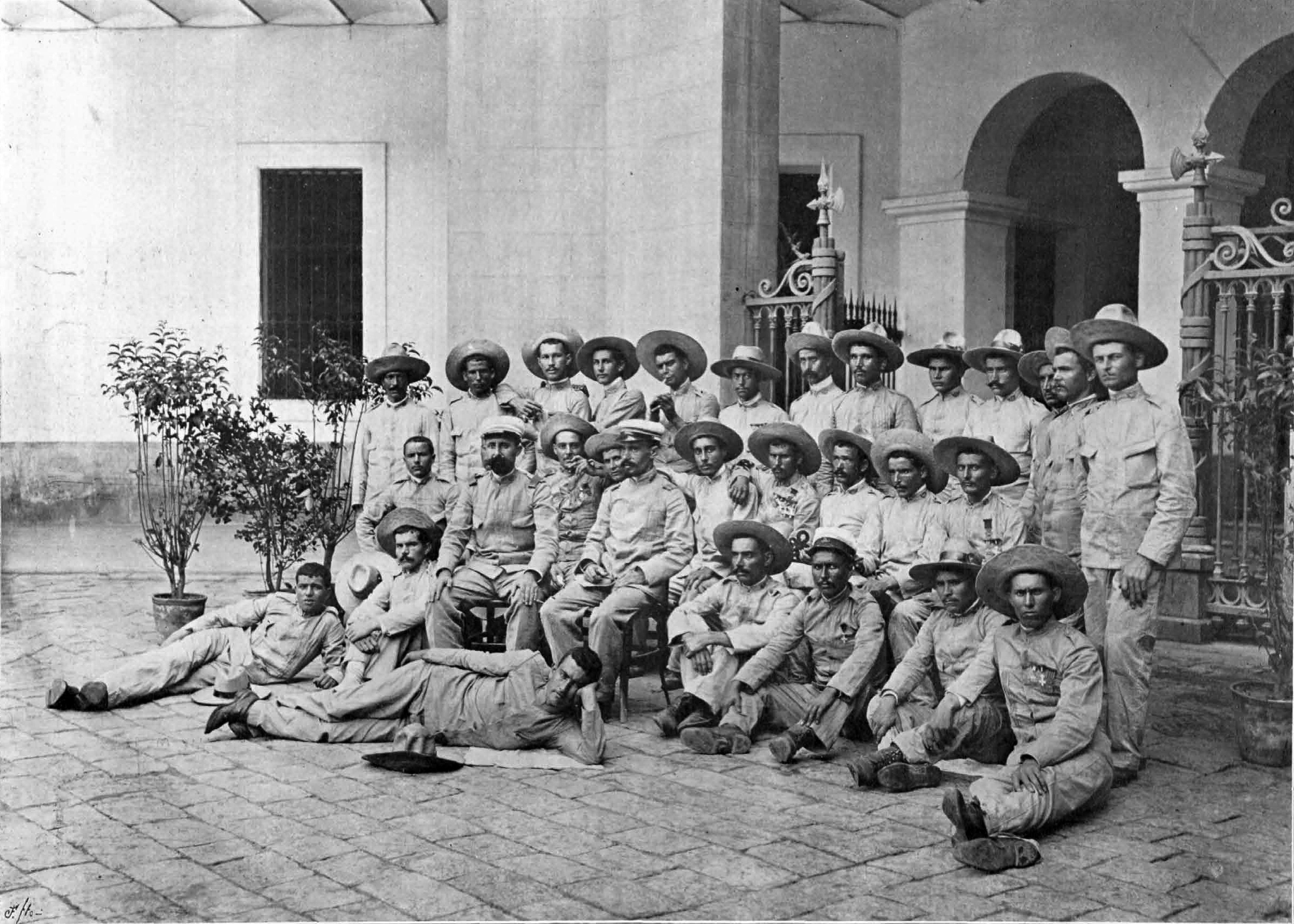
The surviving Spanish soldiers after they had returned to Spain

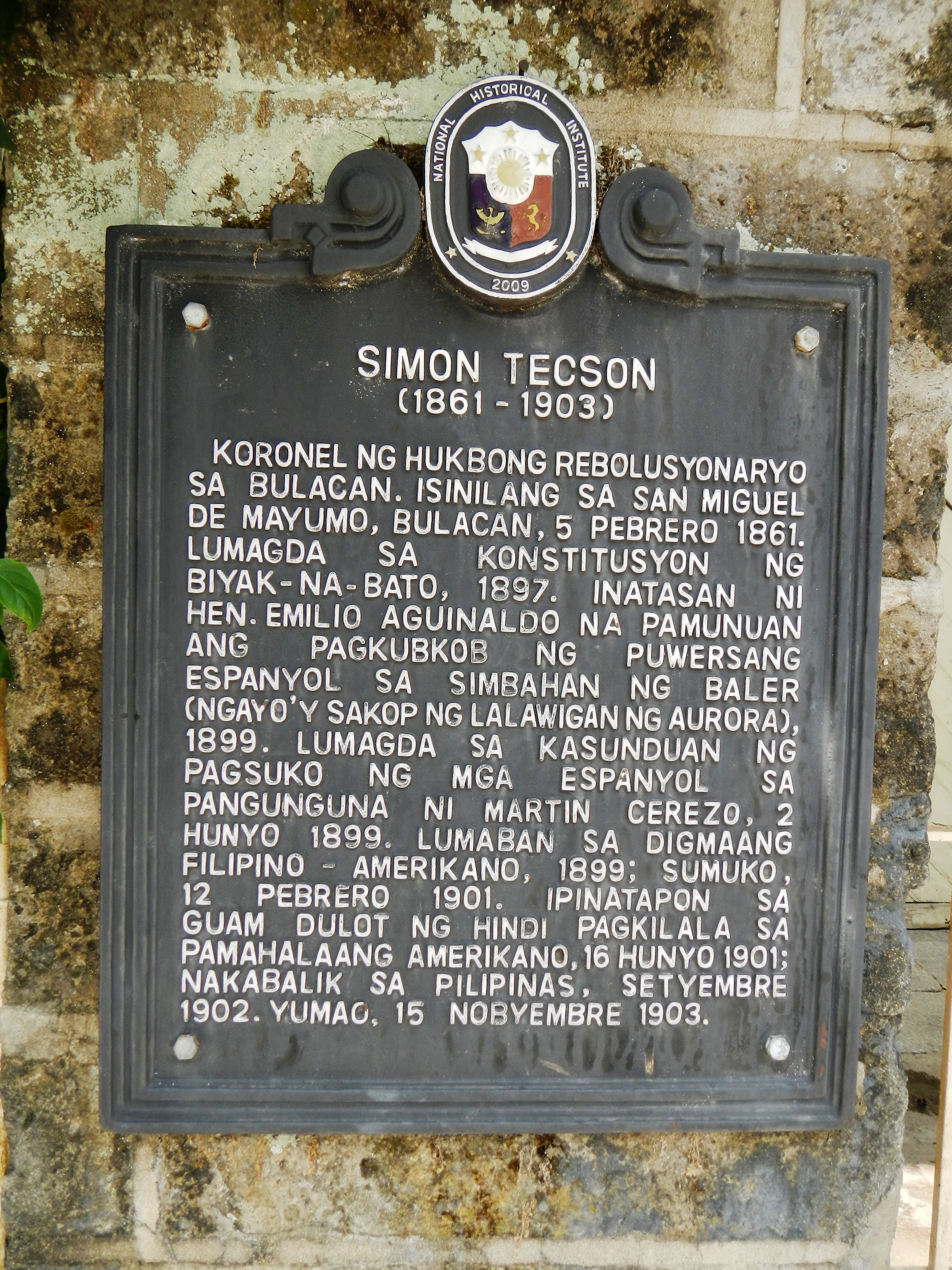
Simón Tecson y Ocampo NHCP (San Miguel

Aguinaldo, now president of the First Philippine Republic, decreed that they were to be considered, "Not as prisoners of war but as friends." He added: "... the valor, determination, and heroism with which that handful of men, cut off and without any hope of aid, defended their flag over the course of a year, realizing an epic so glorious and worthy of the legendary valor of El Cid and Pelayo." Three months later, on 1 September, the survivors including Martín Cerezo, arrived in Barcelona where they were received and honored as heroes.

Martín Cerezo later published a memoir, El Sitio de Baler, where he gave his reasons for holding out: "It would be somewhat difficult for me to explain, principally, I believe through mistrust and obstinacy. Then also on account of a certain kind of auto-suggestion that we ought not for any reason surrender because of national enthusiasm, without doubt influenced by the attractive illusion of glory and on account of the suffering and treasury of sacrifice and heroism and that by surrender, we would be putting an unworthy end to it all."

The two Franciscan priests, Félix Minaya and Juan López, plus the Yorktown seaman George Arthur Venville, were kept as prisoners by Novicio, until the priests were rescued by American forces on 3 June 1900, having re-garrisoned Baler earlier that year. Venville however was led to his death at the hands of Bugkalots, before the American arrival. Furthermore, Novicio was put on trial for ordering the Yorktown sailor Ora B. McDonald buried alive after the ambush. Found guilty, Novicio faced a life sentence of hard labor in Bilibid Prison. Las Morenas was posthumously promoted to "comandante" (major) and awarded the Laureate Cross of Saint Ferdinand, Spain's highest military medal. His widow received a pension of 5,000 pesetas. Martín Cerezo was promoted to major with an annual pension of 1,000 pesetas. He also was decorated with the Royal Cross of the Laureate Cross of Saint Ferdinand, and went on to become a brigadier general. He died in 1945.

Lieutenant Zayas received a posthumous promotion. The enlisted men received the Cross of Military Merit, and each received a monthly pension of 60 pesetas. Of the 50 men who entered the church, around thirty survived the 11-month siege. Fourteen men died from disease. Only two men died from wounds. There were four deserters from the garrison. Two men were imprisoned for helping in the desertion of another (Alcaide), and executed on orders of Martín Cerezo on the day before their surrender. The feat of the Spanish so inspired the United States Army General Frederick Funston that he had Martín Cerezo's memoir translated and gave copies to all his officers. It was published as Under the Red and Gold. The survivors were known as "the last ones of the Philippines". A century after their return, the modern-day Spanish government paid homage to them. The siege is considered by some as the end of the Spanish Empire.

On February 5, 2003, President Gloria Macapagal Arroyo signed Republic Act No. 8197 declaring every June 30th as the Philippine–Spanish Friendship Day and is considered as a national special working holiday and as a non-working holiday in the province of Aurora. Section 1 of the Act stated that "June 30 is a day when President Emilio Aguinaldo commended the besieged Spanish soldiers in the Church of Baler for their loyalty and gallantry."

In July 2009, the NHCP installed a historical marker at the Simon Tecson Ancestral House in San Miguel, Bulacan. Chief of Staff of the Spanish Prime Minister, Miguel Utray Delgado led the celebration of the 22nd Philippine-Spanish Friendship Day and the Siege in Baler's 126th anniversary.

== In popular culture ==
The siege of Baler is portrayed in the 1945 Spanish film Last Stand in the Philippines, the 2008 Filipino film Baler, and the 2016 Spanish film 1898, Our Last Men in the Philippines. The incident also appears in a two-part episode, "Tiempo de valientes", of the Spanish television series El ministerio del tiempo.

== See also ==
- Japanese holdout – Soldiers who kept fighting post-WWII
