= Pablo Olivares =

Film writer and producer (1965–2014)

- Born: 29 June 1965; Madrid, Spain
- Died: 20 November 2014 (aged 49); Madrid, Spain
- Occupations: Screenwriter, film producer

Pablo Olivares (29 June 1965 – 20 November 2014) was a Spanish screenwriter and film producer.

He was known for creating the television series El ministerio del tiempo (2015).

== Death ==
He died on 20 November 2014 from amyotrophic lateral sclerosis at age 49.

== Filmography ==
- El ministerio del tiempo (2015–2017)
- Tiempo de confesiones (2016)
- Víctor Ros (2014)
- Isabel (2012)
- Doctor Mateo (2009–2010)
- Pelotas (2009)
- Brain Drain (2009)
- Los Serrano (2004–2007)
- Vorvik (2005)
- London Street (2003)
- Robles, investigador (2000–2001)
- El secreto de la porcelana (1999)
- Camino de Santiago (1999)
- Ni contigo ni sin tí (1998)
- Campeones (1997)
- Sabor latino (1996)
