= Juan Alonso Zayas =

Puerto Rican Spanish army commander (1869–1898)

- Born: 1869; San Juan, Puerto Rico, Captaincy General of Puerto Rico
- Died: October 8, 1898 (aged 28–29); Baler, Aurora, Captaincy General of the Philippines
- Military career
- Allegiance: Kingdom of Spain
- Branch: Spanish Army
- Service years: 1888–1898
- Rank: Teniente (Lieutenant)
- Commands: 2nd Expeditionary Battalion stationed in Baler, Philippines.
- Conflicts: Tagalog War: Siege of Baler †

Juan Alonso Zayas (1869 – October 8, 1898) was a Puerto Rican who served as a second lieutenant in the Spanish Army. He was the commander of the 2nd Expeditionary Battalion stationed in Baler that fought in the Siege of Baler in the Philippines.

== Early years ==
Zayas was born and raised in San Juan, the capital of Puerto Rico. His father, born in Barcelona, Spain, was an officer in the Spanish Army stationed in the island. Zayas received the best education available as the son of a military official. His main interest was photography, and he became a professional photographer at a young age. In November 1888, when he was 19 years old, Zayas joined the Spanish Army in San Juan.

== Military career ==
Zayas was first assigned to the Infantry Regiment of Luchana N 28. In May 1889, he was sent to Cuba and assigned to the Battalion of Isabel II and later to the Infantry Regiment of Cuba. Zayas was promoted to the rank of sergeant and sent to the School of Sergeants of the Getafe Civil Guard in Madrid, Spain, before the outbreak of the Cuban Revolt of 1895.

By 1897, Zayas was already a second lieutenant, when he received orders to head for the Philippines as commander of the 2nd Expeditionary Battalion stationed in Baler. He arrived in Manila, the capital of the Philippines in May 1897. In Manila, he took a vessel and headed for Baler, which is located on the island of Luzon.

== Siege of Baler ==
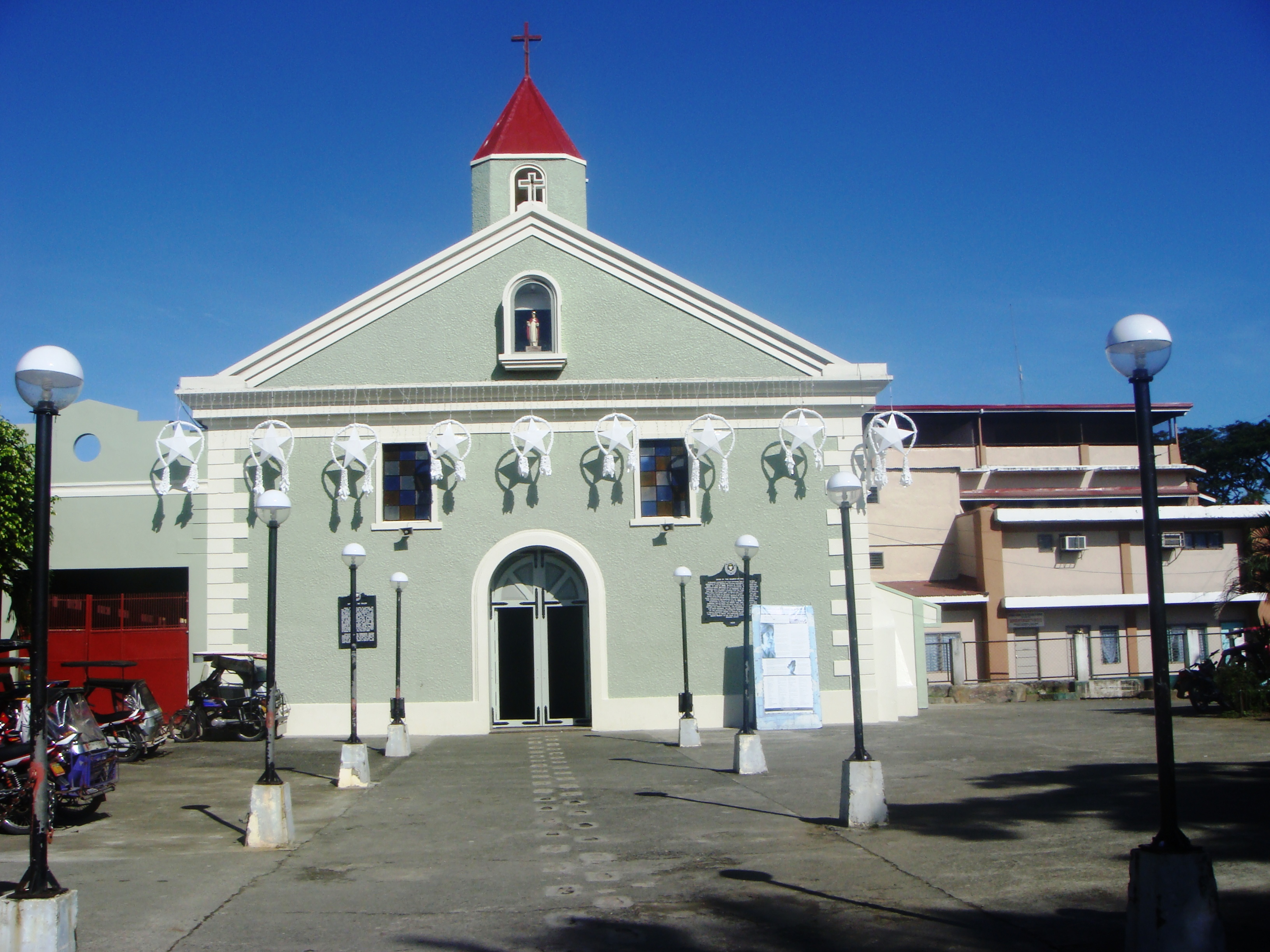
Baler (San Luis Obispo de Tolosa) church.

The distance between Manila and Baler is 100 km (62 miles) and if traveled through the jungles and badly built roads, the actual distance would be 230 km (144 miles). At that time, a system of communication between Manila and Baler was almost non-existent. The only way Baler received news from Manila was by way of sea vessels.

The Spanish colonial government was under constant attack from the local Filipino groups who wanted their independence from the Spanish Crown. Zayas's mission was to fortify Baler against any possible attack. Among his plans for the defense of Baler was to convert the local church of San Luis de Tolosa into a fort. The independence advocates, under the leadership of Col. Calixto Vilacorte, were called "insurgents" or "Tagalos" by the Spanish authorities. On June 28, 1898, they demanded the surrender of the Spanish Army. The Spanish political governor of the region, Enrique de las Morena y Fossi refused. Immediately, the Filipinos attacked Baler in a battle that was to last for seven months. Despite being outnumbered, hunger and disease, the battalion did not give up.

In the meantime, Zayas and the rest of the battalion were totally unaware of the Spanish–American War that was going on. In August 1898, the hostilities between the United States and Spain came to an end. Spain ceded its claim over the Philippine Islands to the United States in accordance with the bilateral Treaty of Paris.

== Spanish surrender ==
In May 1899, the battalion at Baler found out about the Spanish–American War and its aftermath. They had been unaware that they had been fighting for a possession that was no longer theirs to fight for. On June 2, 1899 the battalion's commander, Lieutenant Martín Cerezo surrendered to the Tagalos only after some conditions were met. Among the conditions were the following:

1. That the Spaniards not be treated as prisoners of war and
2. that they would not be harmed in their quest of reaching a Spanish ship that would take them back to Spain.

The 32 survivors of Zayas's battalion were sent to Manila where they boarded a ship headed for their homeland. In Spain, they were given a hero's welcome and became known as "Los Últimos de Filipinas" (lit. 'The Last of the Philippines') and also as "Los Últimos de Baler" (lit. 'The Last of Baler').

Second Lieutenant Juan Alonso Zayas was not among the survivors. He died, on October 8, 1898, from beriberi and with several other members of his unit was buried in San Luis de Tolosa, the church of Baler.

== See also ==
- List of Puerto Ricans
- List of Puerto Rican military personnel
