= Society of the Exterminating Angel =

The Society of the Exterminating Angel was a possibly apocryphal Catholic group in Spain that was created to kill Spanish liberals, founded in 1821. It was revived in 1834 under the presidency of the Bishop of Osma.

The film The Exterminating Angel, by Luis Buñuel, may have been named after this society.
