= Saturnino Martín Cerezo =

Spanish military officer

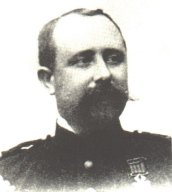
- Cerezo in 1898
- Born: February 11, 1866
- Died: December 2, 1945 (aged 79)
- Military career
- Allegiance: Kingdom of Spain
- Branch: Spanish Army
- Conflicts: Philippine Revolution: Siege of Baler

Commander of the Spanish Detachment of Baler
- In office 18 October 1898 – 2 June 1899
- Preceded by: Juan Alonso Zayas
- Succeeded by: Position abolished

Saturnino Martín Cerezo (11 February 1866 – 2 December 1945) was a Spanish military officer. Martín Cerezo was best known for his commanding of Spanish defenders during the Siege of Baler.

== Biography ==
Martín Cerezo joined the Spanish army at a young age. During the Philippine War of Independence, he served as an officer with the Spanish army garrisoning the islands, then a Spanish imperial possession. In 1898, with the war going badly for the Spanish, Martín Cerezo's unit was assigned to the town of Baler. In June 1898, Cerezo's unit was ambushed by Philippine guerillas—Cerezo's commanding officer, Juan Alonso Zayas, was seriously wounded, and the Spanish were soon besieged in a church in Baler. Martín Cerezo took command of the garrison when Zayas succumbed to his injuries in October. The siege continued until 2 June 1899, when the Spanish garrison was informed of the End of the Spanish-American War and the subsequent end of Spanish rule in the Philippines. Martín Cerezo and the surviving garrison were evacuated to Spain, and their defense of Baler was widely praised in Spain.
