= Cavia (disambiguation) =

Cavia may refer to:

- Cavia, a genus in the subfamily Caviinae
- Cavia, Province of Burgos, a municipality located in Castile and León, Spain.
- Cavia (company), a now-defunct Japanese video game developer.
- Juan Cavia (1984-), an Argentine illustrator and art director.
- Cavia anolaimae, a guinea pig species from South America.

== See also ==
- Calvià, a municipality located in the autonomous community of Balearic Islands, Spain.
- Calvia Crispinilla, was a Roman Imperial courtier.
