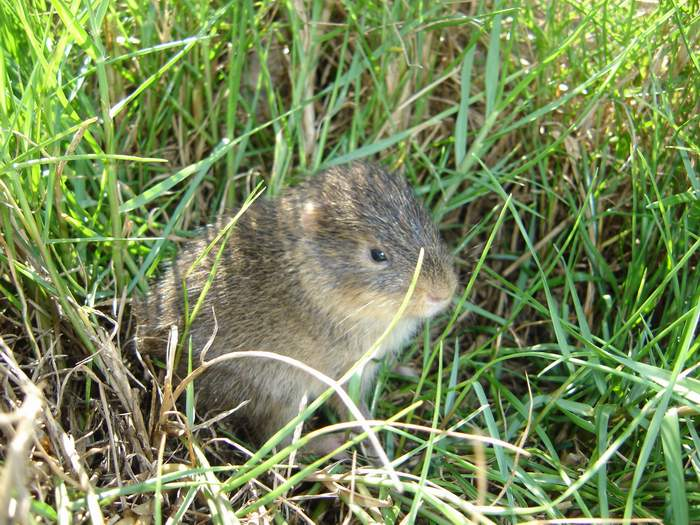

Conservation status
- Critically Endangered (IUCN 3.1)

Scientific classification
- Kingdom: Animalia
- Phylum: Chordata
- Class: Mammalia
- Order: Rodentia
- Family: Caviidae
- Genus: Cavia
- Species: C. intermedia

Binomial name
- Cavia intermedia Cherem et al., 1999
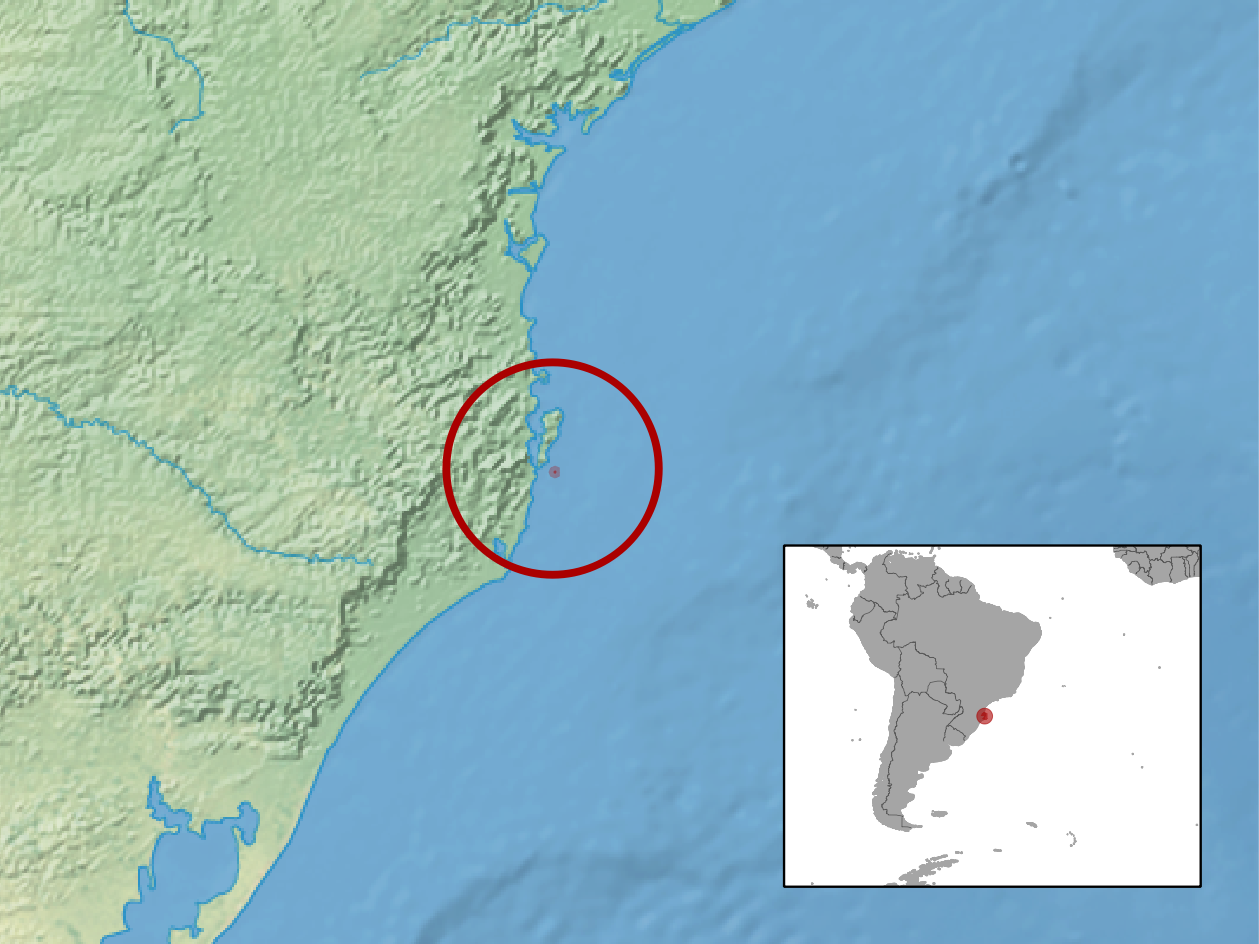

= Santa Catarina's guinea pig =

Rare species of rodent from South America

Santa Catarina's guinea pig (Cavia intermedia) or Moleques do Sul cavy is a rare guinea pig species of southeastern South America.

== Distribution ==
The small mammal is endemic to the Moleques do Sul Archipelago, located in the state of Santa Catarina in southern Brazil. The archipelago formed about 8,000 years ago, having a total of three islands with a surface area of only 10.5 hectares (26 acres). Cavia intermedia is phylogenetically comparable, and said to be a common ancestor of the species Cavia magna, who also inhabited the island. The guinea pig's geographical distribution of only 4 hectares (9.9 acres) is one of the world's smallest for a mammal. The region is a part of Serra do Tabuleiro State Park where restrictions and protection of the species are not enforced. When population densities were estimated, two techniques were used, one was determined using trapping grids, which is usually placed in optimum habitat, which would be only 0.77ha, which are their feeding grounds. This first estimate is 28-44cavies/ha, which is believed to be an overestimate. The other method was minimum-number-known-alive (MNKA), covering the 6.34 ha of vegetation used by the cavies known due to sited feces. It is estimated only 42 Santa Catarina guinea pigs are alive as of 2016.

== Physical description ==
Cavia intermedia is a rodent approximately 20–40 cm in length. These cavies lack sexual dimorphism, which differs from other cavies, among whom males are usually larger than females. Their cylindrical bodies are in shades of brown or gray and are carried by short limbs. These guinea pigs have coarse, long fur with longer fur in the neck region and no fur on the ears. These guinea pigs, like most, have no external tail. Cavies have incisors that continuously grow and are naturally filed down by grazing habits.

== Habitat and diet ==
On the island are about 31 species of birds and an undescribed worm lizard from the family Amphisbaenidae. The climate of Southern Brazil is humid, with hot summers and rainfall all throughout the year. The rainfall is lower in winter.

The Moleques do Sul guinea pigs are found in a 6.34 ha area covered with herbaceous vegetation that serves as a stable food source, Paspalum vaginatum and Stenotaphrum secundatum, while it only amounts to 0.77 ha of land. Bushes and grasses such as Cortaderia selloana and Verbesina glabrata surround the grazing grounds and supply protection and shelter to these insular cavies.

== Predators and ectoparasites ==
Predators of the Cavia intermedia are mostly raptors, such as southern caracaras (Caracara plancus), Yellow headed caracaras (Milvago chimachima), and the Chimango caracaras (Milvago chimango). Moleques do Sul guinea pigs are also vulnerable to the burrowing owl and periguine falcon, which were not observed over the course of research.

Cavies are reported to experience 50 different ectoparasites, however only 4 species have been observed on C.intermedia; two species of lice: Gliricola lindolphoi and Trimenopon hispidom, and two species of mite: Arisocerus hertigi and Eutrombicula sp. . The two mite species were located on the ears of the observed cavies. The relative abundance on C. intermedia was 33 louse species per cavy. Observations suggest the ectoparasite/host ratio of C. intermedia is higher than other Cavia species. C. amperea findings show a 23 louse parasites/host ratio and on C. porcellus there is a 29.1 parasites/host ratio. The higher ratio is related to high population density corresponding to direct contact between the insular cavies, allowing mites and louse species to spread to nearby hosts.

== Life stages and reproduction ==
C. intermedia can reproduce year round, with a gestation time of about 60 days. When compared to domesticated cavies and C. magna, the weaning of young is expected to be no longer than a 30-day weaning period. These endemic cavies have been recorded to produce 1-2 young a litter, which is the same as their relative C. magna who also produces 1-2 young a litter.

These insular guinea pigs have a much slower maturation rate than other cavies. Researchers observed 4 distinct classes within C. intermedia by distinguishing ossified sutures; Age 1 is classified as young without any ossified sutures, Age 2 is classified as 1 ossified suture ranging <400grams, Age 3 is classified as a subadult missing one ossified suture and weighing 400-500g, Age 4 is classified as an adult with all three ossified sutures weighing over 500grams. From age 1 individuals vary from 100g-150g when not bred in captivity (99g). The highest recorded age 1 cavy was 200g. The lowest recorded mass for the adult Age 3 or 4 was 495g. Adult cavies have a mass greater than 500g. In comparison to other species of Cavia, C. intermedia offspring can experience the highest ratio of offspring average mass to mother's average mass. The offspring can reach up to 24% of the mothers average mass. Although the mass differences between sexes had no significance shown in the data, this is not normal for other cavy species. The male guinea pigs usually have higher masses.

The lifespan of these cavies is not well known due to limited data and lack of research; however, Moleques do Sul guinea pigs had an average monthly survival rate of (0.81), which is high for a species within a small geographic location.

== Behaviors ==
Cavia intermedia has an equal male to female ratio within the population, but also home-range sizes do not change with male or female population sizes. Other cavies such as C. magna and C. aperea have significant home-range data suggesting that males home ranges are larger than females, while C. intermedia have home ranges of averaging 1,700 m^{2} for both male and female cavies. Communication and socialization is assumed different in C. intermedia populations than with C. magna and other Cavia species due to similar home-range sizes.

== Threats and conservation ==
Because of the species' low population size and small geographic location, C. intermedia is considered Critically Endangered. Since October 2021, C. intermedia has been classified as Largely Depleted by the IUCN.

In a report published by International Union for Conservation of Nature Species Survival Commission (IUCN SSC), along with the Zoological Society of London, C.intermedia was termed as one of the hundred most threatened species in the world.

Within the grazing grounds the guinea pigs left evidence of exploitation of their food sources. Grasslands on the surrounding islands have a higher biomass and reach about 50 cm, however in feeding areas of the cavies the grasses only reach 5 cm high. Due to the cavies small feeding patch of 0.77 ha overexploitation when the population density is higher creates a natural fluctuation in the mortality of the species. If the land were to experience disturbances or environmental stochastic events the species could more severely decline. Although the site is within a Preservation area, restricted entry is not enforced. Implementation of land management and active monitoring may protect the species from other possible anthropogenic or natural threats.

Researchers suggest monitoring the species vulnerability to parasites and subject the species to parasitological and immunological assessments.

Invasive species of lice, mites or grasses brought to the islands are also a potential threat to the population.
