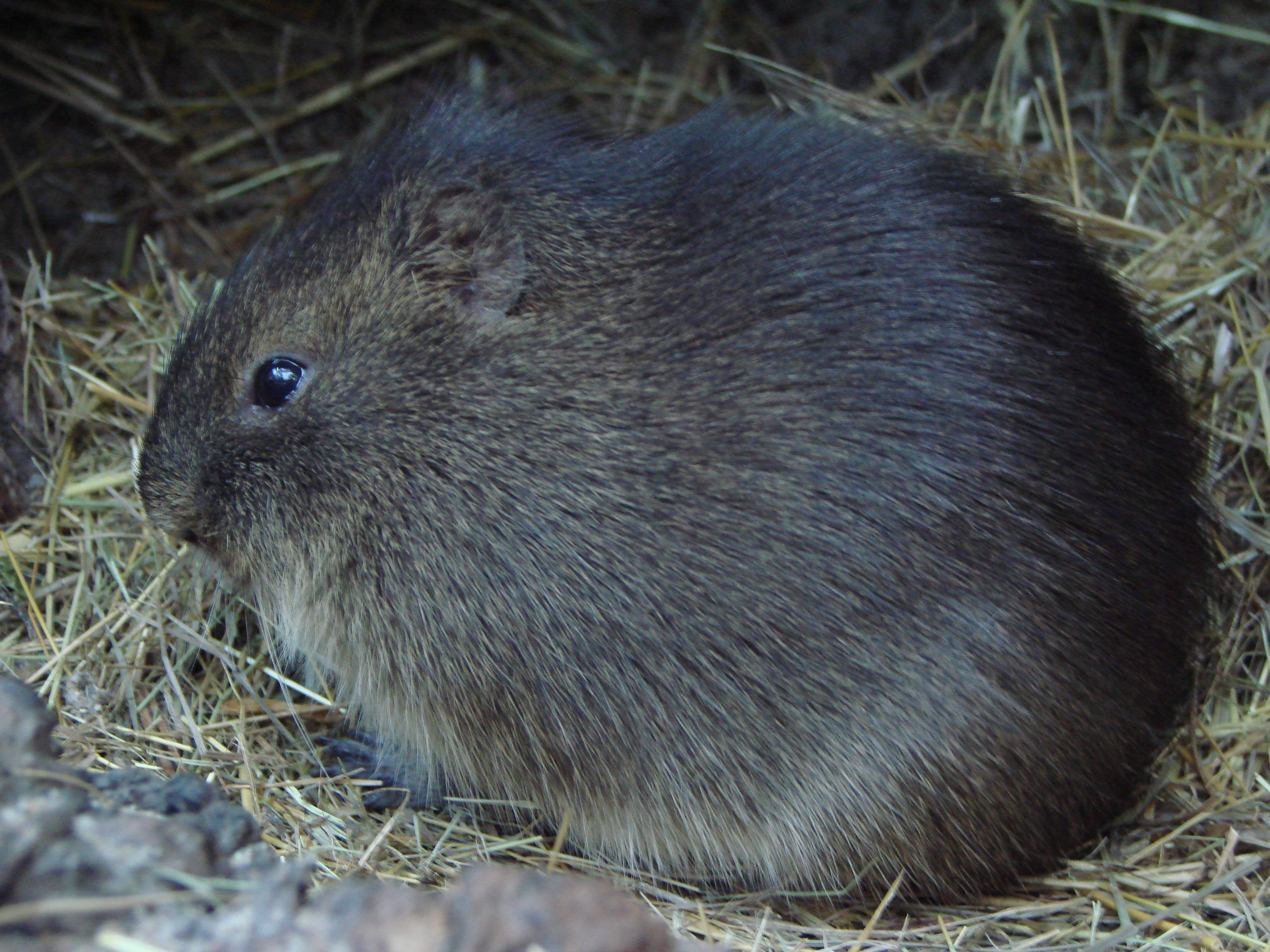

Conservation status
- Least Concern (IUCN 3.1)

Scientific classification
- Kingdom: Animalia
- Phylum: Chordata
- Class: Mammalia
- Order: Rodentia
- Family: Caviidae
- Genus: Cavia
- Species: C. magna

Binomial name
- Cavia magna Ximénez, 1980

= Greater guinea pig =

Species of rodent from South America

Cavia magna, commonly known as the greater guinea pig, is a species of rodent in the family Caviidae, native to South America. It is found primarily in the coastal regions of southern Brazil and Uruguay, inhabiting grasslands, marshes, and other wetland environments. Cavia magna is closely related to the domesticated guinea pig (Cavia porcellus) but is distinct in its larger size and semi-aquatic habitat preferences.

This species exhibits adaptations to its wetland habitats, including a preference for dense vegetation near water. Greater guinea pigs are herbivorous, feeding on grasses, sedges, and other vegetation, and play a role in maintaining the ecological balance of their native habitats. Unlike their domesticated relatives, they are not kept as pets and are primarily studied in the context of their ecological and evolutionary significance.

== Description ==
A large rodent, the greater guinea pig grows to a total length of 310 mm (12.2 in) and weight of 636 g (22.4 oz) for males and a total length of 303 mm (11.9 in) and weight of 537 g (18.9 oz) for females. The dorsal fur is dark agouti brown, and the underparts are reddish brown. It is semiaquatic and has membranes joining the toes.

They have four digits on their front feet, and three digits on their hind feet. They are considered to be stocky, with legs that are short relative to their length. C. magna does not have canine teeth and instead have a diastema (toothless region) between their incisors and molars. Incisors grow continuously, and maintenance requires gnawing on materials such as wood.

This species is both morphologically and genetically similar to Brazilian guinea pigs (Cavia aperea) and Santa Catarina's guinea pigs (Cavia intermedia). The Greater guinea pig is the larger out of all three of these species, with wider upper molars and longer digits.

Its karyotype has 2n = 64 and FN = 128. A variant diploid number of 2n = 62 and FN = 104 has been reported in this species, making it the first record of intra-specific chromosomal variation within Caviidae.

Female genital masculinization has been reported in this species. This phenomenon is suspected to be due to pronounced peaks of androstenedione during the second trimester of pregnancy, a period associated with sexual differentiation of the genitalia.

== Distribution and habitat ==
This species is native to the coastal strip of land in eastern Uruguay and southeastern Brazil. Its typical habitat is moist grassland, marshes, the edges of woodland and small valleys. It is frequently found near formations where the soil is saline, including bodies of water, lagoons and estuaries.

Home-ranges have wide areas of overlap between individuals, which consist of complex networks of tunnels and runways through vegetation. Home-range variability appears to be related to the size of the animal, sex and water level in the area.

C. magna live above ground, and do not retreat into burrows or build nests. During winter periods, their habitats experience major flooding as they occupy wetlands. Males are reported to have drifting home ranges of 11,830 (± 6,210) m², while female drifting home ranges are reported as 7,670 (± 3,970) m². When water levels are high, male ranges increase while female ranges decrease. Home ranges also shift between months independently of water levels; males have lower home range fidelity than females. Overlaps are greater when water levels are higher due to space availability. Overlaps between male-male or male-female home ranges are more common than female-female overlaps. During foraging, individuals will sometimes aggregate, and territorial behavior is not observed.

Cryptic behavior is their main defense against predators. Foraging only occurs within 4m of dense, thick vegetation, allowing them to take cover if a predator is spotted. Freezing behavior is exhibited until a predator comes within a few meters, at which point the guinea pig will flee. Regardless, the Greater guinea pig has a high mortality rate, highest during the dry summer months.

Primary predators are Lesser grissons (Galictis cuja), accounting for over 75% of mortalities in one study. Other predators include:

- Crab-eating foxes (Cerdocyon thous)
- Little water opossums (Lutreolina crassicaudata)
- Cinerous harriers (Circus cinereus)
- Long-winged harriers (Circus buffoni)
- Roadside hawks (Buteo magnirostris)
- Chimango caracaras (Milvago chimango)
- Southern crested caracaras (Caracara plancus)
- Great horned owls (Bubo virginianus)
- Patagonia green racers (Philodyras patagoniensis)

== Behaviour ==
The greater guinea pig is an herbivore. While this species is considered solitary, they have also been described as colonial without stable social bonds. This species is typically active during the early morning and late afternoon. It has also been reported that they can form hierarchical groups during foraging.

C. magna is a monogastric herbivore, depending on microbial fermentation in the gut. Poaceae make up a large majority of their diet. Paspalum is another group commonly foraged, with an abundance of Paspalum urvillei found in C. magna feces - a plant with high nutritional content, palatability and low fiber content. Juncus acutus is another plant consumed in abundance, notably increasing in consumption during the winter.

Feces are described as small, cylindrical and dark green. Viscous mucus is also visible when fresh.

The mating system for C. magna is thought to be polygynandry, or promiscuity. It is suspected that males use their larger home range sizes for roaming, and mate with every female in estrous that they are able to encounter. Courtship is not strongly synchronized in females, location of females is unpredictable, and this species lives solitary lifestyles, meaning that monopolizing several females is impossible for males.

Females seem capable of breeding at any time of year, but births predominate in spring and the early part of summer (September to December). Females may have up to three litters in one year. The gestation period is approximately 64 days. Pregnant females gain up to 42% in body weight. Newborns weigh approximately 18% of their mother's body weight in the wild and are considered an extreme example of precocial small mammals. Litters are small, consisting of one to three pups, which are born with eyes open, fully furred and able to run within the first hour of birth. Some females born in spring are capable of breeding successfully between 30 and 45 days old. Producing small litters of precocial offspring with high survival rates is considered odd for this small mammal, as similar species are known for large litters of altricial young.

Offspring can begin ingesting solid foods within a week of birth. Pups stay near the mother for 3 to 5 weeks, while the female is still lactating. Females are aggressive to pups that are not their own. Males have been observed displaying paternal care, primarily through grooming and social play.

When agonistic behavior does occur, it is typically between individuals of the same sex. Agonistic behaviors consist of thrusting heads at each other, biting and chasing.

Chemical communication is vital in this species. During courtship, males urinate on females; females reject courtship by spraying urine on a courting male. Males mark territory by smearing excrement and anal gland secretions on the ground. Vocal communication is also present. Excitement is vocalized by high-pitched squeaking, stress by chirping, and teeth chattering to ward off perceived threats.

== Status ==
The International Union for Conservation of Nature has rated the conservation status of the greater guinea pig as being of "least concern". It has a restricted range but has a total area of occupancy of more than 20,000 square kilometres (7,722 sq mi). It is believed to have a large total population, and although the population is thought to be slightly declining in Uruguay, this is not at a rate sufficiently significant for it to be listed in a more threatened category.
