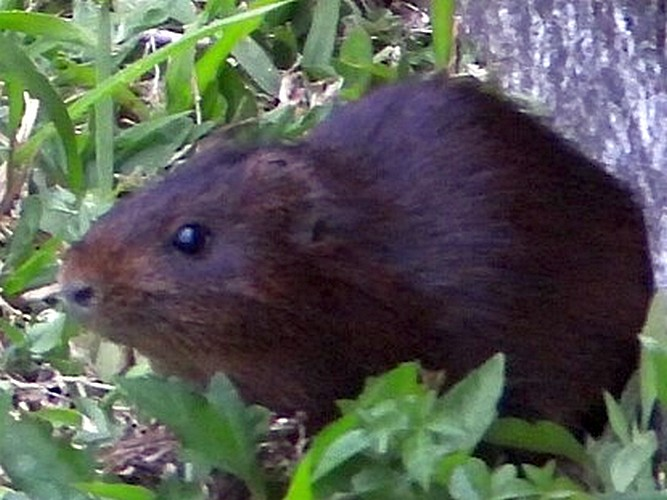

Conservation status
- Least Concern (IUCN 3.1)

Scientific classification
- Kingdom: Animalia
- Phylum: Chordata
- Class: Mammalia
- Order: Rodentia
- Family: Caviidae
- Genus: Cavia
- Species: C. fulgida

Binomial name
- Cavia fulgida Wagler, 1831

= Shiny guinea pig =

Species of rodent from South America

The shiny guinea pig (Cavia fulgida) is a guinea pig species of southeastern South America.

The rodent is endemic to Brazil. It is native to the Atlantic Forest ecoregions.

== Taxonomy ==
Wagler first called the species Cavia fulgida in 1831; P. W. Lund identified a Cavia rufescens in 1841, but since Oldfield Thomas (1901) these are considered to be identical species.
