= Cavia guianae =

Scientific classification
- Kingdom: Animalia
- Phylum: Chordata
- Class: Mammalia
- Infraclass: Placentalia
- Order: Rodentia
- Family: Caviidae
- Genus: Cavia
- Species: C. guianae

Binomial name
- Cavia guianae Thomas, 1901

Species of rodent

Cavia guianae is a guinea pig species from South America. It is found in southern Venezuela, Guyana, and portions of northern Brazil. Some biologists believe it to be a feral offshoot of the domestic guinea pig, Cavia porcellus; others subsume it under the wild cavy, Cavia aperea. Molecular data collected show there is little genetic differentiation in C.a. guianae known to be a lowland locality in comparison to C. anolaimae which are predominantly highland populations.

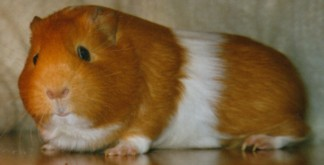
Some researchers consider C. guianae to merely be a feral population of C. porcellus (shown)
