= British Cavy Council =

Governing body for UK guinea pig clubs

The British Cavy Council is the governing body in the United Kingdom for national, regional, and local cavy (guinea pig) clubs, and also for the wide range of 'breed clubs' which exist on a national basis to further the interests of particular cavy breeds, and to provide a forum for those with an interest in the breed concerned.

== Nature of the Council ==
The Council is not itself a club or association - it is not possible, for example, to be a subscribing member, as it has only executive members. Most cavy 'fanciers' (people interested in breeding and showing purebred, or pedigree, cavies) in the United Kingdom will belong to one of the large network of local cavy clubs, and usually also one of the large regional cavy clubs (such as the Southern Cavy Club, National Cavy Club, or Scottish National Cavy Club). They may also belong to the breed club associated with their particular breed of cavy. It is in these clubs that those interested in purebred (pedigree) cavies mix with others who have similar interests, and find opportunities for showing their animals. However, all of these clubs (of which there are more than 75 in the United Kingdom) recognise the British Cavy Council as the ultimate authority.

== Authority of the Council ==
Given that most cavy activity is in the local, regional, and breed clubs, and that the large regional clubs are also the governing authorities for show rules, appeals, and judging (including the training of judges), the precise role of the British Cavy Council is sometimes misunderstood. The Council has sole responsibility as:

- the only body competent to recognise and define different (and new) breeds of cavy;
- the recognised authority for setting 'standards' for the judging of purebred cavies in shows;
- the registering and certifying authority for official cavy breeding studs (registering a stud name entitles the holders to breed and show under that name, and prevents anyone else from using the same name - it is not necessarily a guarantee of quality);
- the ultimate authority and arbiter in all matters of interest to the cavy world in the United Kingdom.
