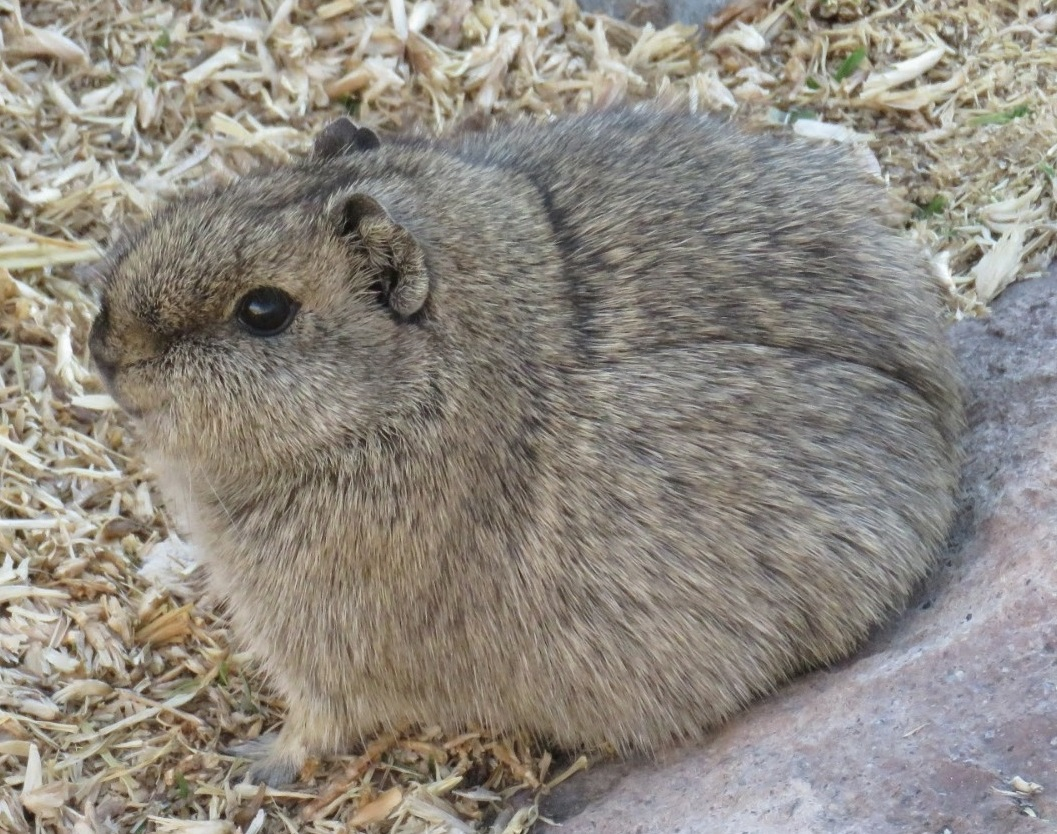

Conservation status
- Least Concern (IUCN 3.1)

Scientific classification
- Kingdom: Animalia
- Phylum: Chordata
- Class: Mammalia
- Infraclass: Placentalia
- Order: Rodentia
- Family: Caviidae
- Genus: Cavia
- Species: C. tschudii

Binomial name
- Cavia tschudii Fitzinger, 1867
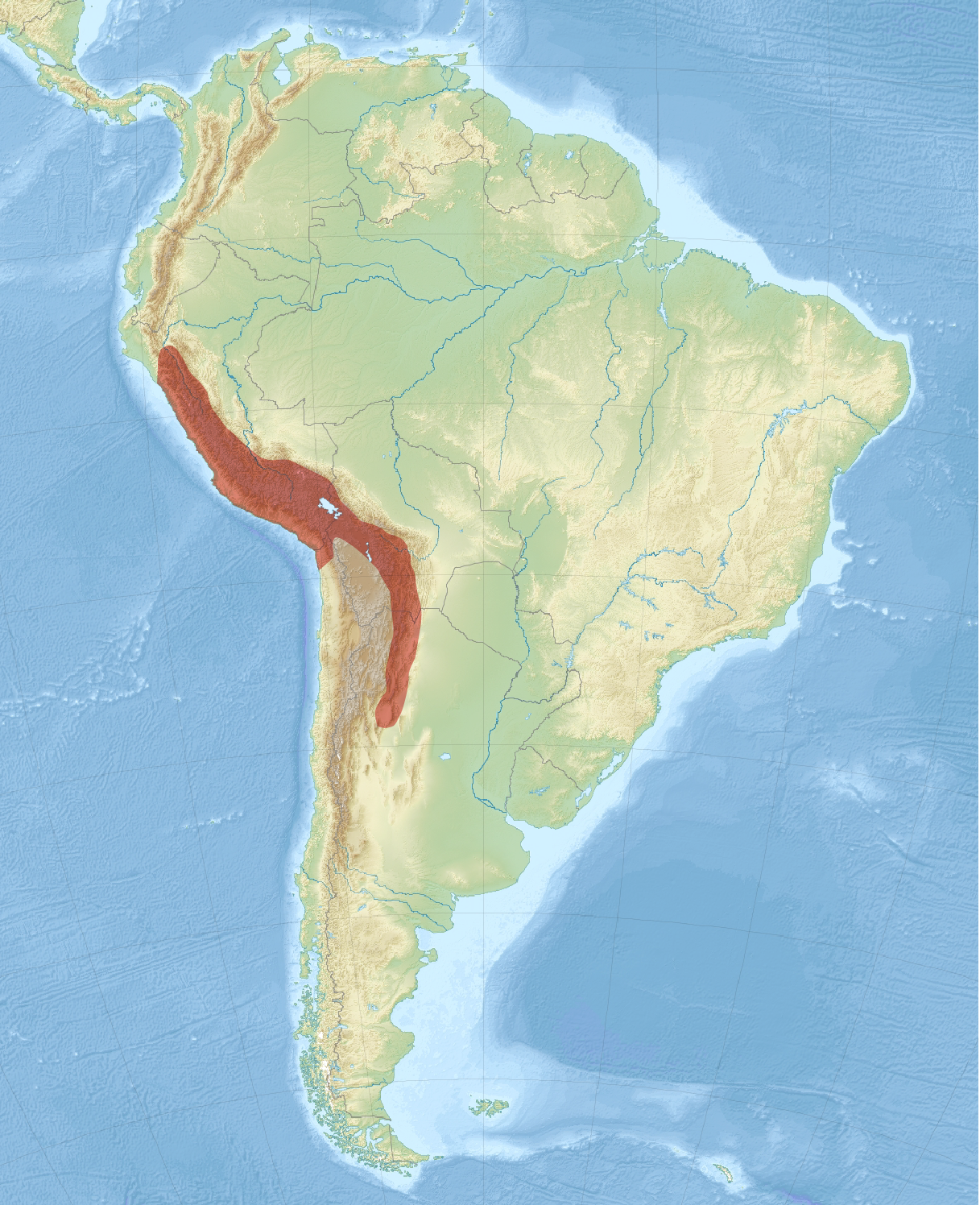

= Montane guinea pig =

Species of rodent from South America

The montane guinea pig (Cavia tschudii) is a species of caviid rodent found in the Andes in South America. The montane guinea pig is the likely main ancestor of Cavia porcellus, the domestic guinea pig or domestic cavy, which appears to be a hybrid that includes lesser genetic contributions from other Cavia species.

== Taxonomy ==
Peruvian wild guinea pigs were first described by E. T. Bennett in 1835, who termed them Cavia cutleri. J. J. Tschudi, in an 1845 publication, used the term Cavia cutleri to refer to what are now considered two separate species: The first, Bennett's Cavia cutleri, which was later identified (by O. Thomas in 1917) as probably a differently-pigmented version of Cavia porcellus, and the second, a wild Peruvian guinea pig that was clearly different from the animal Bennett described. In 1867, L. Fitzinger renamed the clearly wild guinea pig Cavia tschudii.

== Description ==
The montane guinea pig is a medium-sized species, growing to a total length of 247 mm (9.7 in). Their colour varies in different parts of the range; in Peru, the dorsal fur is dark reddish-brown mixed with black, and the underparts are dark buffy-grey; in Chile, the dorsal surface is pale agouti brown with paler underparts; in Bolivia, the upper parts are agouti olive and the underparts creamy-white or white.

== Distribution and habitat ==
The montane guinea pig is native to the high Andes in South America. Its range extends from Peru southward to the Tarapacá Region of Chile and the Tucumán Province of Argentina. Its altitude range is 2,000 to 3,800 metres (6,600 to 12,500 ft) above sea level. It lives in moist habitats with rocks and coarse vegetation, making runways through the foliage. In Argentina it lives in burrows with several entrances.

== Lifecycle ==
The montane guinea pig has a gestation period around 63 days. Litter size ranges from one to four, and the young grow quickly, becoming independent at 2 months of age.
