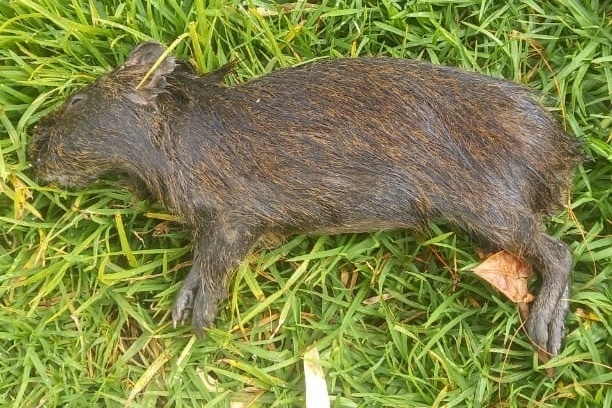

Conservation status
- Data Deficient (IUCN 3.1)

Scientific classification
- Kingdom: Animalia
- Phylum: Chordata
- Class: Mammalia
- Infraclass: Placentalia
- Order: Rodentia
- Family: Caviidae
- Genus: Cavia
- Species: C. patzelti

Binomial name
- Cavia patzelti Schliemann, 1982
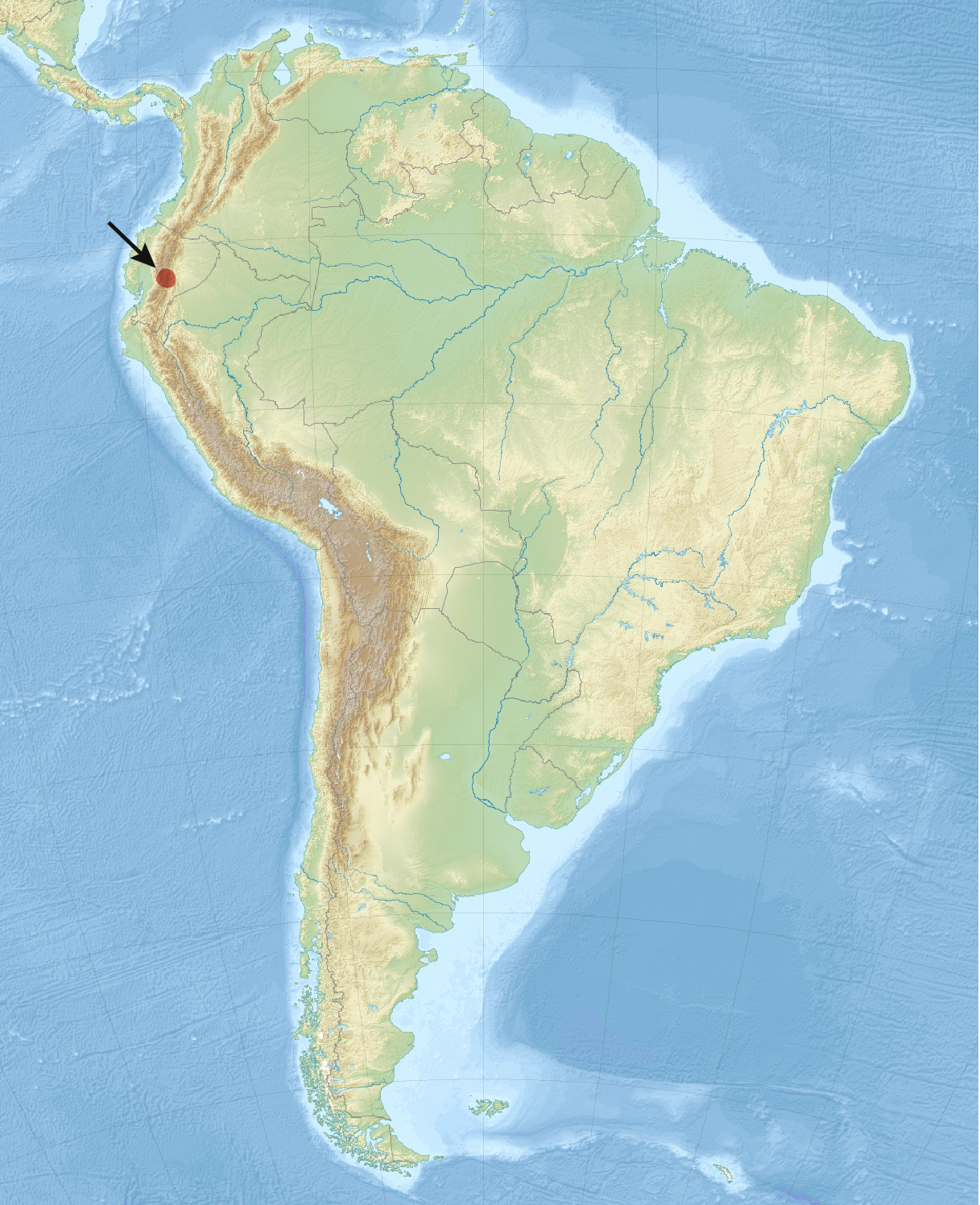

= Cavia patzelti =

Sacha guinea pig

Species of rodent

Cavia patzelti, commonly known as the Sacha guinea pig, is a species of Cavia native to Ecuador. Little is known about its population.
