= Peter Gurney =

British activist

Gurney collecting an award at Great Ormond Street Children's Hospital for having visited children for 10 years with his guinea pigs

Peter Gurney (9 March 1938 – 2 July 2006) was an English author and campaigner for the rights and welfare of guinea pigs. He was associated with the Cambridge Cavy Trust, founded by Vedra Stanley-Spatcher.

Starting in 1990, Gurney was a regular hospital visitor to Great Ormond Street Hospital with five of his guinea pigs. The children called him "The Guinea Pig Man".

== Biography ==
Born in Luton, Gurney attended Beech Hill Secondary Modern School. He was enlisted in the Royal Navy for his National Service, and drove buses and lorries for a living upon his discharge. At the age of 48 he bought his first guinea pig.

Early retirement after a serious accident which left Gurney unable to drive allowed him to devote his attention to guinea pig medicine. Veterinary training did not concentrate on small pets, and Gurney found this sufficient spur to confront and complain about the self-regulation of the veterinary profession and highlight its lack of knowledge in the area.

In 1992 Gurney wrote his first book, The Proper Care of Guinea Pigs, during recovery from kidney cancer. During this period, Michael Bond, best known for his Paddington Bear books, met Gurney and encouraged him in his work and writing.

== Cancer ==
In 1992 he was diagnosed with kidney cancer, and, during his initial recovery, wrote his first book, The Proper Care of Guinea Pigs, taking all the photographs himself. Gurney wrote a number of other books, including The Sex Life of the Guinea Pig, which he promoted on a tour of the United States.

When Great Ormond St Hospital told him that guinea pigs were no longer welcome for health and safety reasons, Gurney complained "[T]hat bunch of control freaks in government took this away from me."

In 2006 he was advised that his cancer had returned and was incurable. He made arrangements to find new homes for his guinea pigs, 40 of whom survived him, before his death at age 68. His final book, Last of Their Kind, was released posthumously in April 2007.

== Books ==
Gurney wrote several books on the health, care and welfare of guinea pigs. He toured the US to promote The Sex Life of Guinea Pigs.

- Gurney, Peter. Piggy Potions: Natural Remedies for Guinea Pigs. ISBN 1-85279-004-0.
- Gurney, Peter. The Sex Life of Guinea Pigs. ISBN 1-85279-133-0.
- Gurney, Peter. The Proper Care of Guinea Pigs. ISBN 0-7938-3151-2.
- Gurney, Peter. What's My Guinea Pig?. ISBN 1-85279-034-2.
- Gurney, Peter (April 2007). Last of Their Kind. Diggory Press. ISBN 978-1-84685-657-0.
