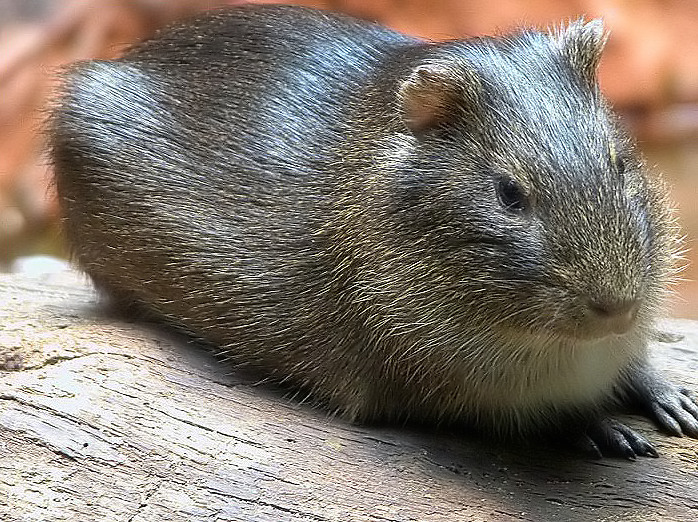
- Cavia aperea, or Brazilian guinea pig

Scientific classification
- Kingdom: Animalia
- Phylum: Chordata
- Class: Mammalia
- Order: Rodentia
- Family: Caviidae
- Subfamily: Caviinae
- Genus: Cavia; Pallas, 1766

Type species
- Cavia cobaya Pallas, 1766 (= Mus porcellus Linnaeus, 1758)

Species
- Cavia anolaimae; Cavia aperea; Cavia fulgida; Cavia guianae; Cavia intermedia; Cavia magna; Cavia patzelti; Cavia porcellus; Cavia tschudii
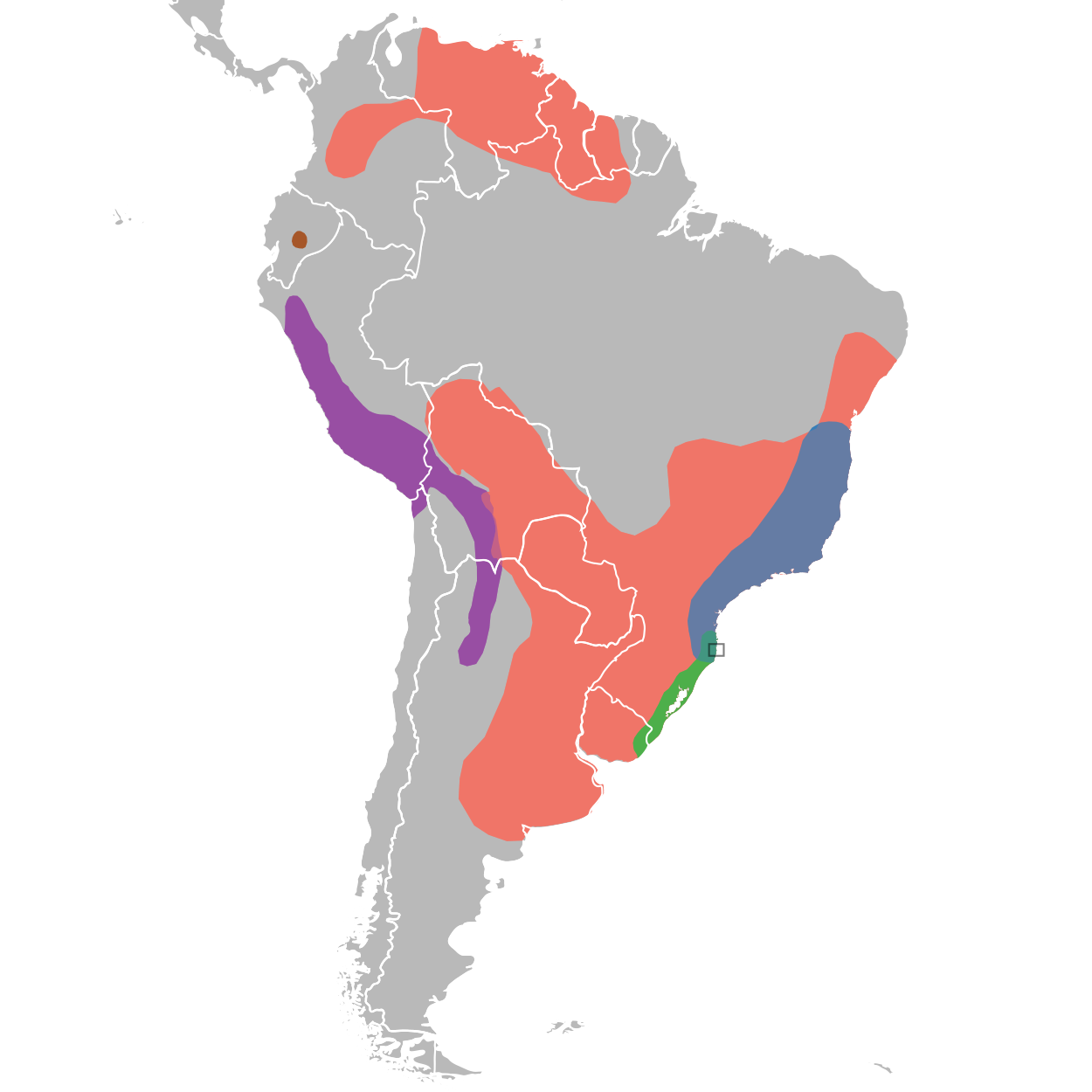
- Cavia distribution C. aperea in red, C. fulgida in blue, C. magna in green, C. tschudii in purple, C. patzelti in brown, C. intermedia in yellow (in box), excludes worldwide domesticated distribution of C. porcellus

= Cavia =

Cavia Temporal range: Pliocene – Holocene

Genus of rodents

Cavia is a genus in the subfamily Caviinae that contains the rodents commonly known as the guinea pigs or cavies. The best-known species in this genus is the domestic guinea pig, Cavia porcellus, a meat animal in South America and a common household pet outside that continent.

== Characteristics ==
=== General characteristics ===
The true guinea pigs are medium-sized rodents. They reach a head-body length of 20 to 35 centimeters (8 to 14 inches) and a weight of between 500 and 1,000 grams. The largest species of the genus is the greater guinea pig (Cavia magna). The species are very similar in habit and appearance, the long and relatively rough fur is usually grayish or brown to reddish-brown in color. The coloring can be variable, especially in species with a large distribution area and several subspecies.

The head is relatively large in relation to the body, the eyes are large and the ears are small. The legs are short and strong, the front feet have four toes and the hind feet have three, all of which end in sharp claws, the middle one being the longest. All species of the genus are also tailless.

=== Characteristics of the skull and teeth ===
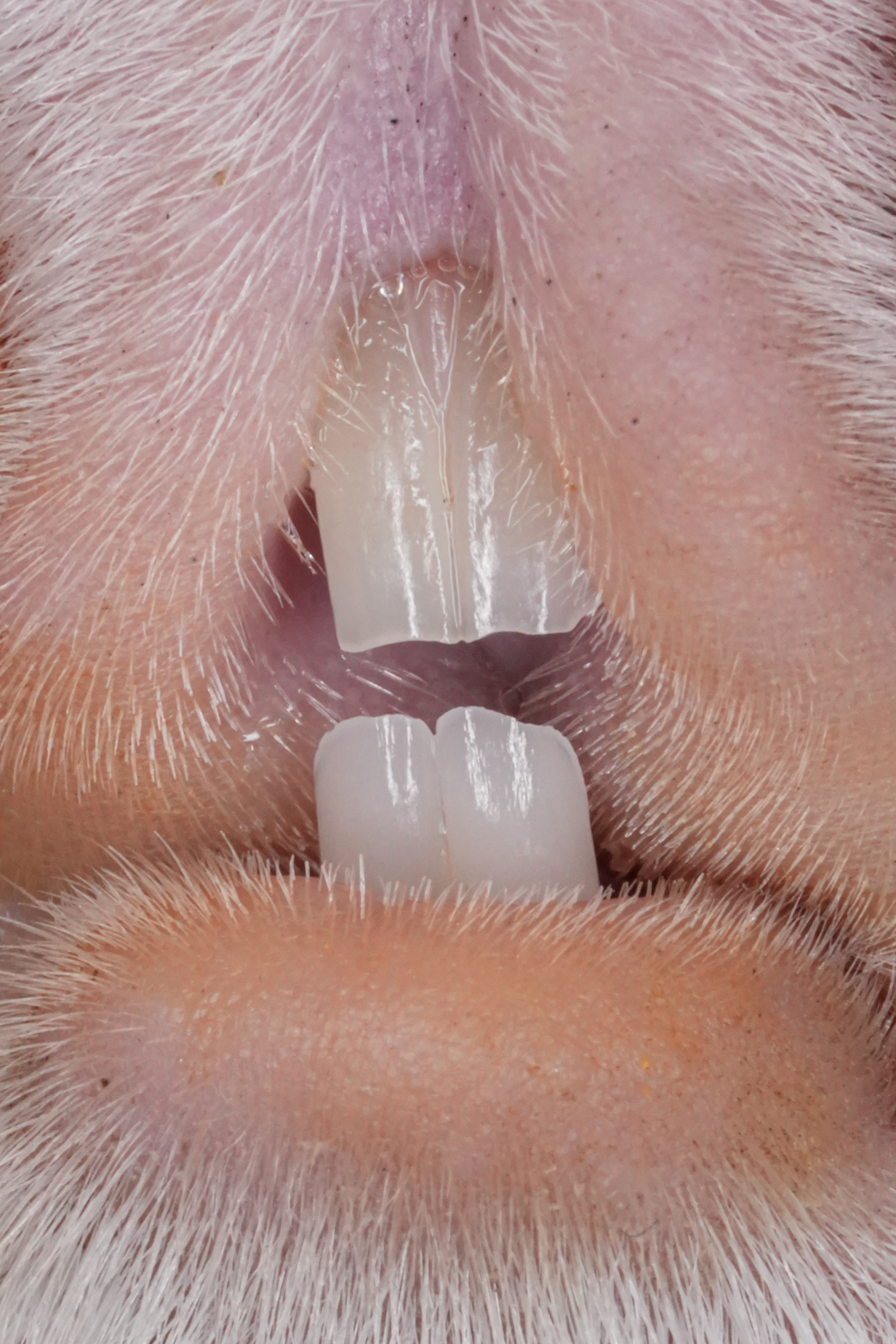
Incisors of a domestic guinea pig

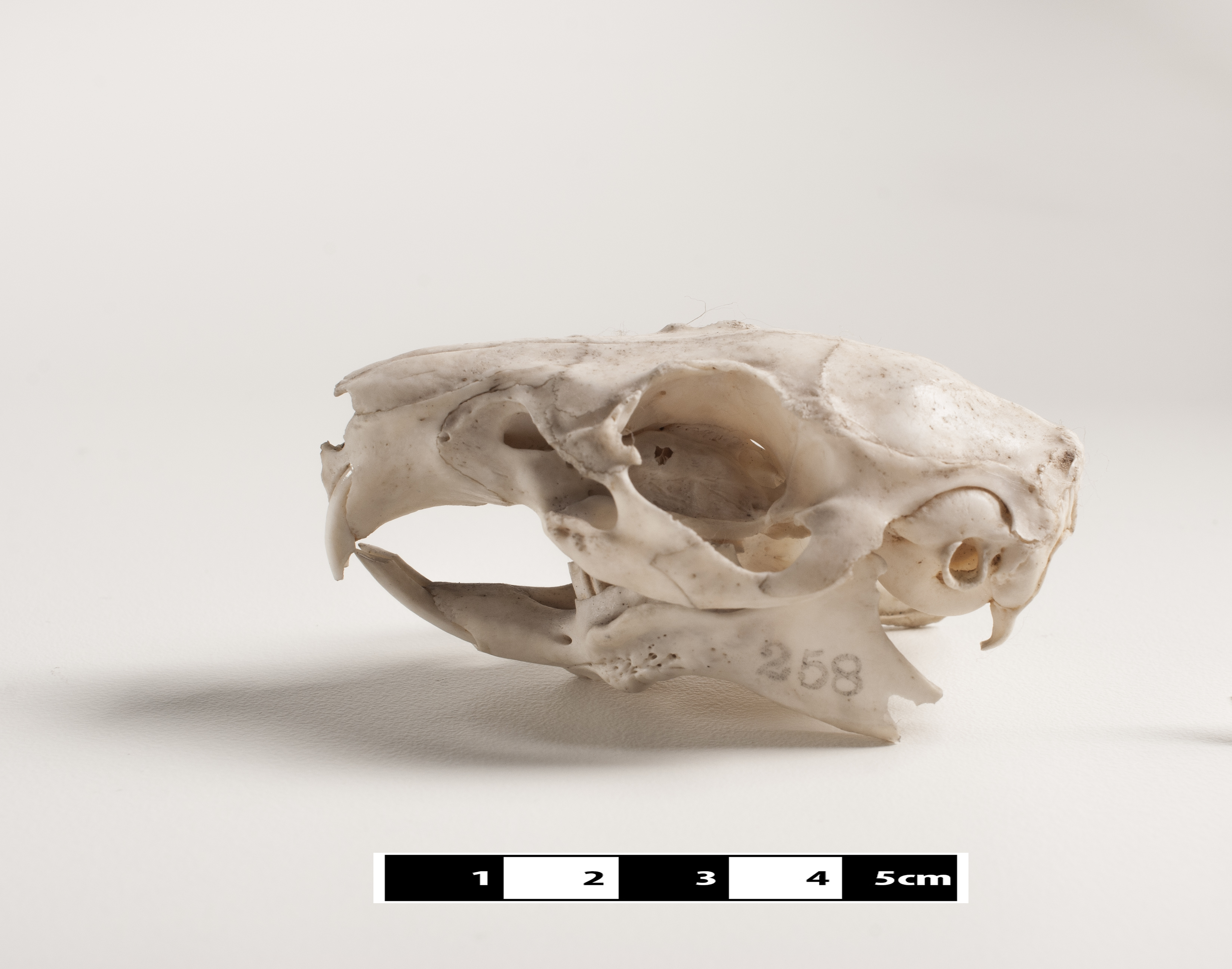
Skull of a domestic guinea pig

Guinea pigs have a typical rodent dentition with incisors (incisivi) and a gap between the teeth (diastema). In both the upper and lower jaws, there is one premolar and three molars in each half. Overall, they have a set of 20 teeth, like all guinea pigs. The teeth are hypsodont like all species of guinea pigs and converge towards the front. The crowns are prismatic and the teeth grow throughout life. In contrast to the yellow-toothed cavies (Galea), the teeth are white in colour.

The jaws of all guinea pigs are hystricomorphous ("porcupine-like"): the angular process growing from the rear end of the lower jaw is not in line with the rest of the jaw, as is the case with other rodents with a sciuromorphous ("squirrel-like") jaw structure, but is angled sideways. The masseter muscle, a jaw muscle, runs partially through the infraorbital foramen, which is correspondingly enlarged; moreover, like all representatives of the Hystricognathi, they lack the infraorbital plate. The species of true guinea pigs can be regarded as comparatively primitive in terms of skull structure. They have only a slight interorbital constriction of the skull, pan elongated paroccipital process of the occipital bone, a relatively short hard palate and enlarged tympanic cavity. The skulls of the mountain cavies correspond to those of the true guinea pigs, but are significantly more compact and rounded.

== Former taxonomic controversy ==
Cavia is classified in order Rodentia, although there was once a minority belief in the scientific community that evidence from mitochondrial DNA and proteins suggested the Hystricognathi might belong to a different evolutionary offshoot, and therefore a different order. If this had been so, it would have been an example of convergent evolution. However, this uncertainty is largely of historical interest, as abundant molecular genetic evidence now conclusively supports classification of Cavia as rodents. This evidence includes draft genome sequences of Cavia porcellus and several other rodents.

== Species ==
Historically, there has been little consensus in regard to the number of Cavia forms and their taxonomic affiliations. Morphological characters differentiating between Cavia species are limited and levels of inter- and intraspecific morphologic variation have not been well documented, thus, interpretations have varied and resulted in very different taxonomic conclusions. Three scientists disagreed on the number of species, Tate (1935) recognized 11 species, while Cabrera (1961) recognized seven, and Huckinghaus (1961) recognized only three. Recent scientific compilations have generally followed either Cabrera or Huckinghaus.

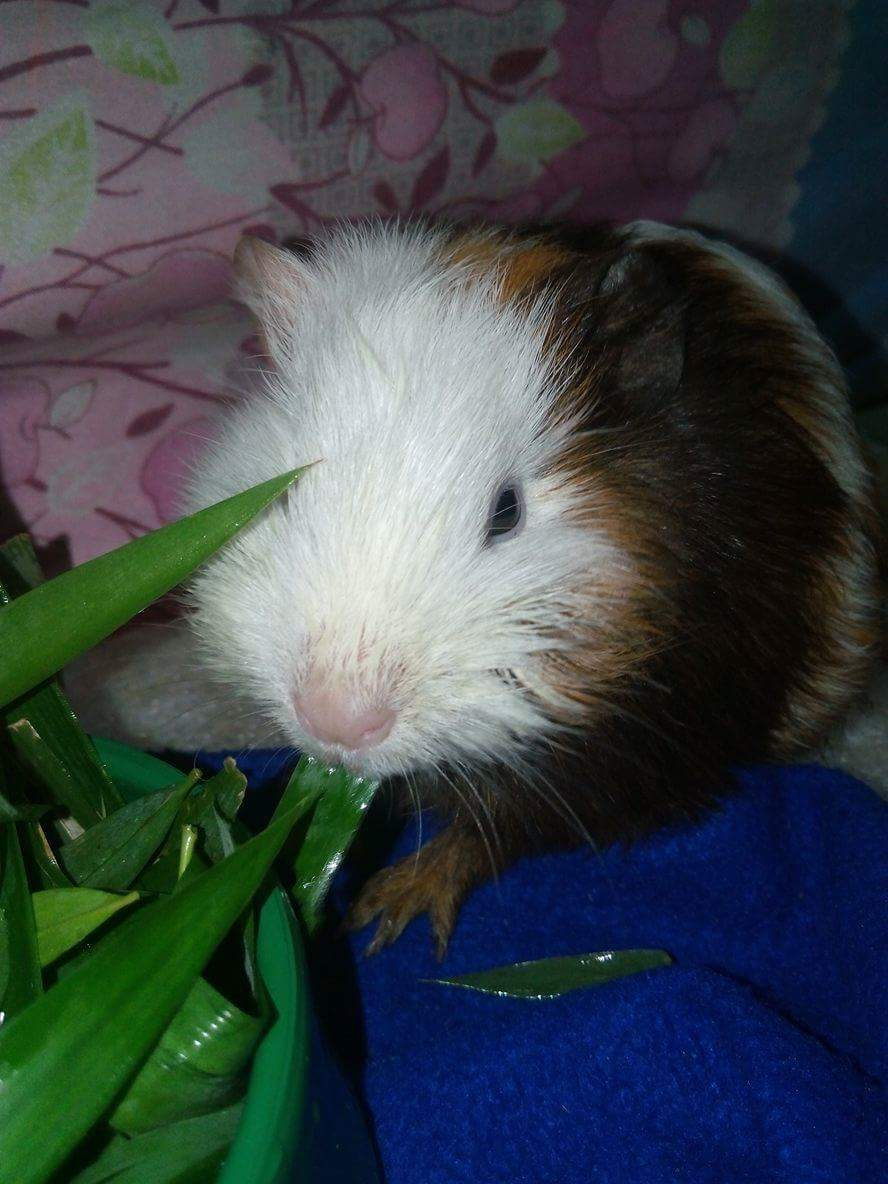
A domestic guinea pig (Cavia porcellus) eating grass leaves

At least five wild species of guinea pig are recognised, in addition to the domestic form:

- Cavia aperea – Brazilian guinea pig, widespread east of the Andes
- Cavia fulgida – shiny guinea pig, eastern Brazil
- Cavia intermedia – intermediate guinea pig, Moleques do Sul islands, Santa Catarina, Brazil, first described in 1999
- Cavia magna – greater guinea pig, Uruguay, southeast Brazil
- Cavia porcellus – domestic guinea pig, wild ancestor is likely:
- Cavia tschudii – montane guinea pig, Peru south to northern Chile and northwest Argentina

Some authors also recognise the following additional species:

- Cavia anolaimae (often considered a synonym of C. porcellus or a subspecies of C. aperea) – Colombia
- Cavia guianae (often considered a synonym of C. porcellus or a subspecies of C. aperea) – Venezuela, Guyana, Brazil
- Cavia patzelti (often considered a synonym of C. aparea) - Ecuador

In addition, four fossil species have been identified:

- †Cavia cabrerai - early Pliocene Argentina
- †Cavia galileoi - late Pliocene Argentina
- †Cavia lamingae – late Pleistocene Brazil
- †Cavia vates – late Pleistocene Brazil
