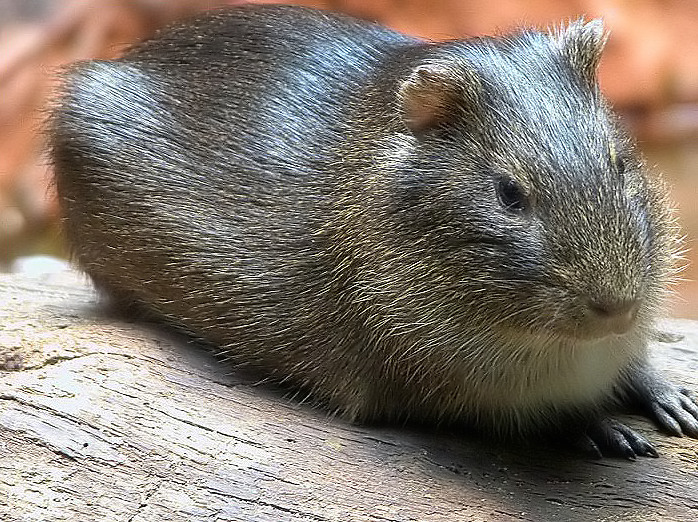

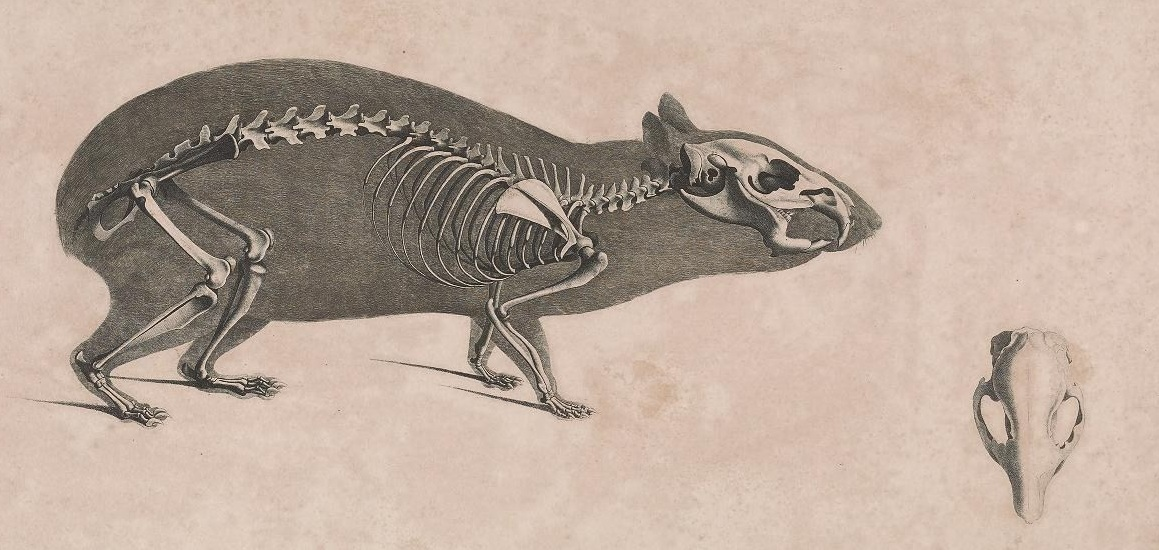

Conservation status
- Least Concern (IUCN 3.1)

Scientific classification
- Kingdom: Animalia
- Phylum: Chordata
- Class: Mammalia
- Infraclass: Placentalia
- Order: Rodentia
- Family: Caviidae
- Genus: Cavia
- Species: C. aperea

Binomial name
- Cavia aperea Erxleben, 1777

Subspecies
- C. a. aperea C. a. guianae C. a. hypoleuca C. a. pamparum C. a. rosida

= Brazilian guinea pig =

Species of rodent from South America

The Brazilian guinea pig (Cavia aperea) (preá in Portuguese) is a wild guinea pig species found in Argentina, Brazil, Bolivia, Colombia, Ecuador, Guyana, Paraguay, Uruguay and Venezuela.

Cavia aperea has been successfully mated to the domestic guinea pig, Cavia porcellus, though many females become infertile in successive generations. Brazilian guinea pigs are mainly diurnal animals and are narrower and longer than domesticated guinea pigs.

== Description ==
This is a medium-sized guinea pig with an adult length of about 272 mm (11 in) and a weight of 637 grams (22.5 oz). The tail, at around 2.4 mm, is almost non-existent. The dorsal fur is dark olive-brown mixed with brown and black, and the underparts are a pale grey or yellowish-grey.

Its karyotype has 2n = 64 and a reportedly variable FN of 116 or 128 for C. a. aperea and 128 for C. a. pamparum.

== Distribution ==
The Brazilian guinea pig has a wide distribution in South America at altitudes between 400 and 3,000 metres (1,300 and 9,800 ft) above sea level. Its range extends from Colombia, Ecuador and Venezuela to areas in the north of Argentina. Its typical habitat is open grassland and savannah.

== Behaviour ==
Cavia aperea is a herbivore and feeds on grasses and other herbs. It is diurnal, mainly emerging in the early morning to forage and again in the evening. It does not dig a burrow, but makes an intricate maze of surface tunnels that are 8 to 12 cm (3 to 5 in) wide. It has latrine areas beside the trackways where piles of bean-shaped droppings can be seen, as can piles of cut grass stems.

Breeding takes place at any time of year but mostly in the austral summer. The gestation period is about 62 days and females can have five litters in a year. The number of young born averages two and ranges from one to five. The minimum age at which the young adults can breed is thirty days.

== Status ==
The Brazilian guinea pig has a wide range and no particular threats have been identified. It is a common species with a stable population and, as well as living in open savannah country, it is capable of adapting to disturbed habitats. For these reasons, the International Union for Conservation of Nature has rated its conservation status as "least concern".
