= List of caviids =

Species in mammal family Caviidae

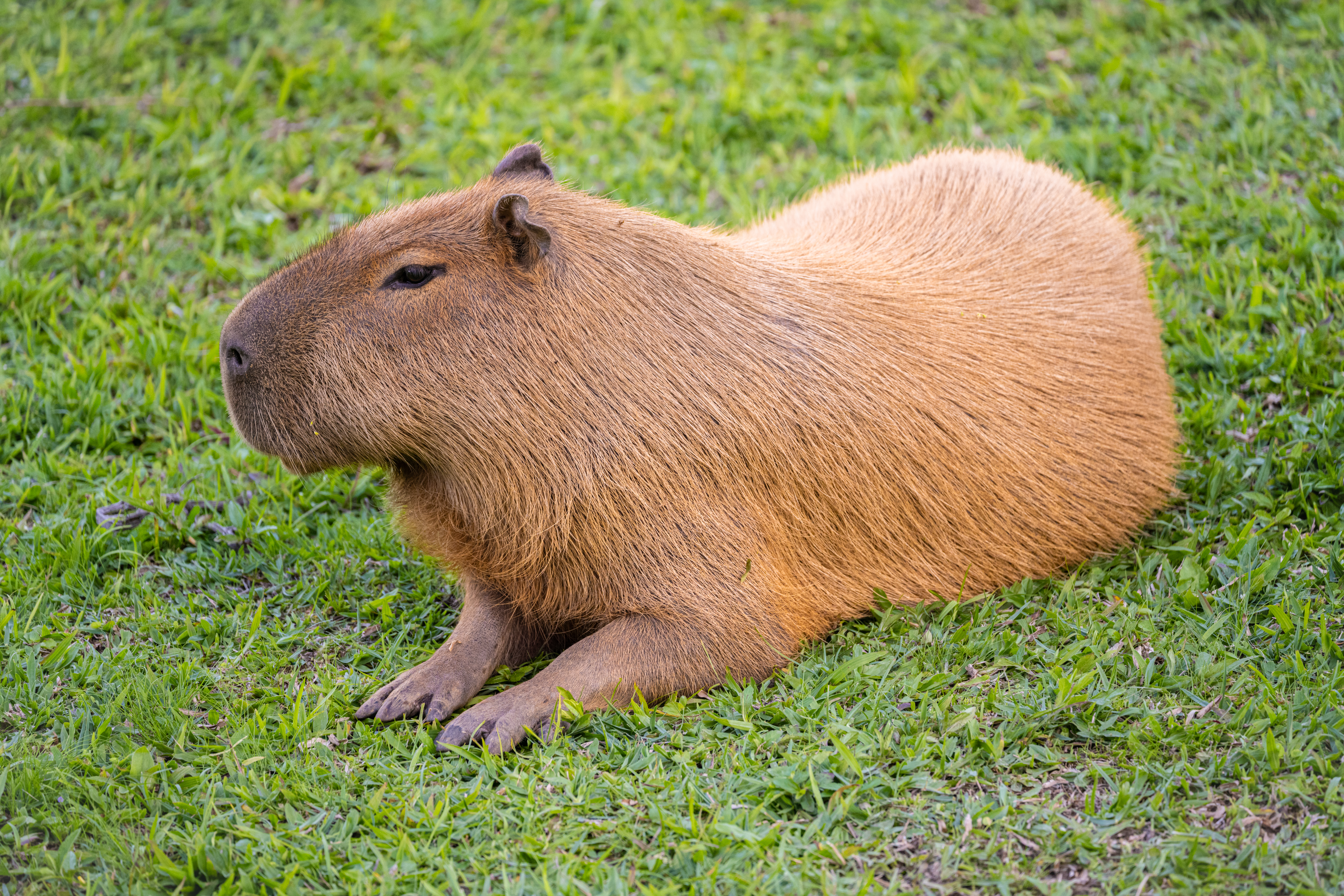
Capybara (Hydrochoeris hydrochaeris)

Caviidae is a family of mammals in the order Rodentia and part of the Caviomorpha parvorder. Members of this family are called caviids and include guinea pigs, cavies, maras, and capybaras. They are found in South America and the southeast tip of Central America, primarily in forests, shrublands, grasslands, and savannas, though some species can be found in wetlands or rocky areas. They range in size from Shipton's mountain cavy, at 19 cm (7 in), to the capybara, at 134 cm (53 in) plus a 2 cm (1 in) tail. Caviids are herbivores and eat a wide variety of vegetation, primarily grass and leaves. Almost no caviids have population estimates, though the Santa Catarina's guinea pig is categorized as critically endangered with a population of fewer than sixty mature adults, and the domesticated guinea pig has a population of over 36 million, not including a large worldwide population as pets.

The twenty-one extant species of Caviidae are divided into three subfamilies: Caviinae, containing fifteen species of guinea pigs and cavies in three genera; Dolichotinae, containing a single genus of two mara species; and Hydrochoerinae, containing four capybara and cavy species in two genera. A few extinct prehistoric caviid species have been discovered, though due to ongoing research and discoveries, the exact number and categorization is not fixed.

== Conventions ==
IUCN Red List categories
Conservation status
- EX: Extinct (0 species)
- EW: Extinct in the wild (0 species)
- CR: Critically endangered (1 species)
- EN: Endangered (0 species)
- VU: Vulnerable (0 species)
- NT: Near threatened (1 species)
- LC: Least concern (13 species)

Other categories
- DD: Data deficient (5 species)
- NE: Not evaluated (1 species)

The author citation for the species or genus is given after the scientific name; parentheses around the author citation indicate that this was not the original taxonomic placement. Conservation status codes listed follow the International Union for Conservation of Nature (IUCN) Red List of Threatened Species. Range maps are provided wherever possible; if a range map is not available, a description of the caviid's range is provided. Ranges are based on the IUCN Red List for that species unless otherwise noted.

== Classification ==
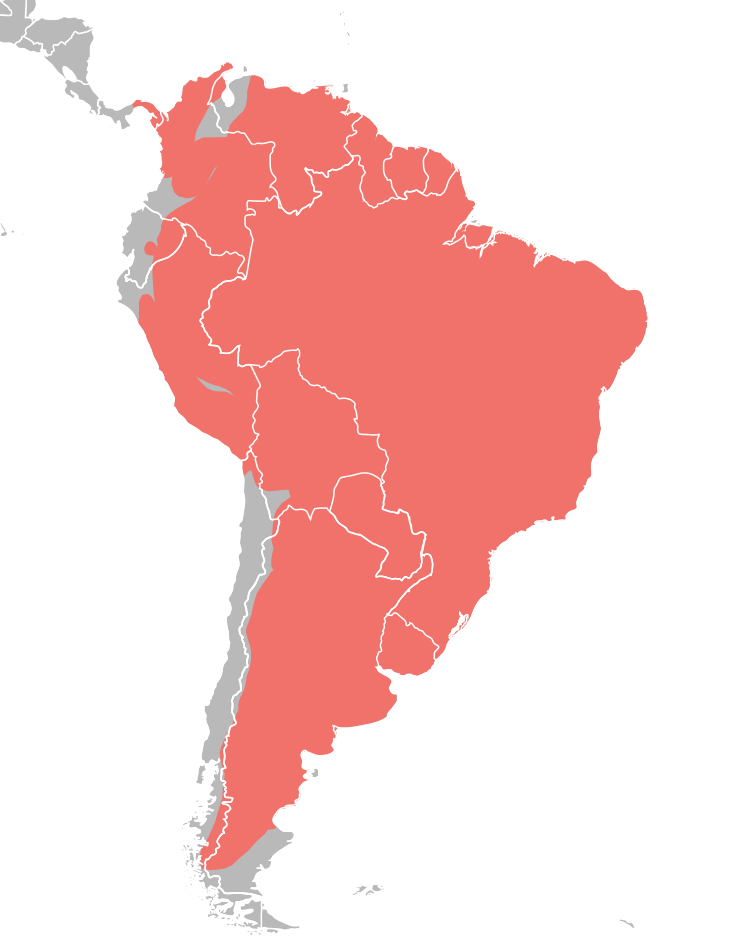
Caviidae distribution

Caviidae is a family consisting of twenty-one extant species in six genera. These genera are divided between three subfamilies: Caviinae, containing guinea pigs and cavies; Dolichotinae, or the maras; and Hydrochoerinae, containing capybara and cavy species.

Family Caviidae

- Subfamily Caviinae
  - Genus Cavia (guinea pigs): seven species
  - Genus Galea (yellow-toothed cavies): five species
  - Genus Microcavia (mountain cavies): three species
- Subfamily Dolichotinae
  - Genus Dolichotis (maras): two species
- Subfamily Hydrochoerinae
  - Genus Hydrochoerus (capybaras): two species
  - Genus Kerodon (rock cavies): two species

- Caviidae
  - - Caviinae
      - Galea
      - - Cavia
        - Microcavia
  - - Dolichotinae
      Dolichotis
    - Hydrochoerinae
      - Hydrochoerus
      - Kerodon

== Caviids ==
The following classification is based on the taxonomy described by the reference work Mammal Species of the World (2005), with augmentation by generally accepted proposals made since using molecular phylogenetic analysis, as supported by both the IUCN and the American Society of Mammalogists.

=== Subfamily Caviinae ===
Genus Cavia – Pallas, 1766 – seven species
| Common name | Scientific name and subspecies | Range | Size and ecology | IUCN status and estimated population |
|---|---|---|---|---|
| Brazilian guinea pig | C. aperea Erxleben, 1777 Five subspecies: C. a. aperea; C. a. guianae; C. a. hypoleuca; C. a. pamparum; C. a. rosida | Northern, central, and eastern South America | Size: 21–39 cm (8–15 in) long, with no tail Habitat: Savanna, grassland, and rocky areas Diet: Wide variety of vegetation | LC Unknown |
| Greater guinea pig | C. magna Ximénez, 1980 | Southern Brazil and Uruguay | Size: 22–34 cm (9–13 in) long, with no tail Habitat: Forest and grassland Diet: Wide variety of vegetation | LC Unknown |
| Guinea pig | C. porcellus (Linnaeus, 1758) | Worldwide, primarily western South America | Size: 20–25 cm (8–10 in) long, with no tail Habitat: Domesticated; wild guinea pigs are found in grasslands Diet: Wide variety of vegetation | NE 36 million, excluding pets |
| Montane guinea pig | C. tschudii Fitzinger, 1867 Six subspecies: C. t. arequipae; C. t. festina; C. t. osgoodi; C. t. sodalis; C. t. stolida; C. t. tschudii | Western South America | Size: 22–27 cm (9–11 in) long, with no tail Habitat: Forest, grassland, and inland wetlands Diet: Wide variety of vegetation | LC Unknown |
| Sacha guinea pig | C. patzelti Schliemann, 1982 | Ecuador | Size: 28–29 cm (11 in) long, with no tail Habitat: Grassland Diet: Wide variety of vegetation | DD Unknown |
| Santa Catarina's guinea pig | C. intermedia Cherem, Olimpio, & Trianón, 1999 | Moleques do Sul Archipelago in southern Brazil | Size: 27–31 cm (11–12 in) long, with no tail Habitat: Grassland Diet: Wide variety of vegetation | CR 24–60 |
| Shiny guinea pig | C. fulgida Wagler, 1831 | Southeastern Brazil | Size: 22–27 cm (9–11 in) long, with no tail Habitat: Forest and grassland Diet: Wide variety of vegetation | LC Unknown |

Genus Galea – Meyen, 1832 – five species
| Common name | Scientific name and subspecies | Range | Size and ecology | IUCN status and estimated population |
|---|---|---|---|---|
| Brazilian yellow-toothed cavy | G. flavidens Brandt, 1835 | Central Brazil | Size: 20–23 cm (8–9 in) long, with no tail Habitat: Savanna and rocky areas Diet: Grass, forbs, and other vegetation | LC Unknown |
| Common yellow-toothed cavy | G. musteloides Meyen, 1832 Five subspecies: G. m. auceps; G. m. demissa; G. m. leucoblephara; G. m. littoralis; G. m. musteloides | Western South America | Size: Unknown, with no tail Habitat: Shrubland and grassland Diet: Grass, forbs, and other vegetation | DD Unknown |
| Lowland yellow-toothed cavy | G. leucoblephara (Burmeister, 1861) | Southwestern South America | Size: 19–23 cm (7–9 in) long, with no tail Habitat: Grassland Diet: Grass, forbs, and other vegetation | LC Unknown |
| Southern highland yellow-toothed cavy | G. comes Thomas, 1919 | Western South America | Size: About 24 cm (9 in) long, with no tail Habitat: Shrubland Diet: Grass, forbs, and other vegetation | DD Unknown |
| Spix's yellow-toothed cavy | G. spixii Wagler, 1831 Three subspecies: G. s. palustris; G. s. spixii; G. s. wellsi | Eastern Brazil | Size: 22–23 cm (9 in), with no tail Habitat: Savanna and rocky areas Diet: Grass, forbs, and other vegetation | LC Unknown |

Genus Microcavia – Gervais & Ameghino, 1880 – three species
| Common name | Scientific name and subspecies | Range | Size and ecology | IUCN status and estimated population |
|---|---|---|---|---|
| Andean mountain cavy | M. niata (Thomas, 1898) Two subspecies: M. n. niata; M. n. pallidior | Western South America | Size: 19–20 cm (7–8 in) long, with no tail Habitat: Grassland and inland wetlands Diet: Leaves, as well as fruit | LC Unknown |
| Shipton's mountain cavy | M. shiptoni (Thomas, 1925) | Northern Argentina | Size: About 19 cm (7 in) long, with no tail Habitat: Grassland and rocky areas Diet: Leaves, as well as fruit | LC Unknown |
| Southern mountain cavy | M. australis (Geoffroy & d'Orbigny, 1833) Three subspecies: M. a. australis; M. a. maenas; M. a. salinia | Southern South America | Size: Unknown, with no tail Habitat: Forest, savanna, and desert Diet: Leaves, as well as fruit | LC Unknown |

=== Subfamily Dolichotinae ===
Genus Dolichotis – Desmarest, 1820 – two species
| Common name | Scientific name and subspecies | Range | Size and ecology | IUCN status and estimated population |
|---|---|---|---|---|
| Chacoan mara | D. salinicola Burmeister, 1876 | Western South America | Size: 42–48 cm (17–19 in) long, plus 1–2 cm (0.4–0.8 in) tail Habitat: Savanna Diet: Wide variety of vegetation | LC Unknown |
| Patagonian mara | D. patagonum (Zimmermann, 1780) Two subspecies: D. p. centricola; D. p. patagonum | Argentina | Size: 60–80 cm (24–31 in) long, plus 2–4 cm (1–2 in) tail Habitat: Forest, shrubland, and grassland Diet: Wide variety of vegetation | NT Unknown |

=== Subfamily Hydrochoerinae ===
Genus Hydrochoerus – Brisson, 1762 – two species
| Common name | Scientific name and subspecies | Range | Size and ecology | IUCN status and estimated population |
|---|---|---|---|---|
| Capybara | H. hydrochaeris (Linnaeus, 1766) | South America | Size: 107–134 cm (42–53 in) long, plus 1–2 cm (0.4–0.8 in) tail Habitat: Forest, savanna, and inland wetlands Diet: Grass, as well as aquatic plants, grains, melons, and squashes | LC Unknown |
| Lesser capybara | H. isthmius Goldman, 1912 | Northwestern South America and Panama | Size: About 102 cm (40 in) long, plus 1–2 cm (0.4–0.8 in) tail Habitat: Forest and inland wetlands Diet: Grass, as well as aquatic plants, grains, melons, and squashes | DD Unknown |

Genus Kerodon – F. Cuvier, 1825 – two species
| Common name | Scientific name and subspecies | Range | Size and ecology | IUCN status and estimated population |
|---|---|---|---|---|
| Acrobatic cavy | K. acrobata Moojen, Locks, & Langguth, 1997 | Central Brazil | Size: About 38 cm (15 in) long, with no tail Habitat: Forest, savanna, and rocky areas Diet: Leaves and other tree vegetation | DD Unknown |
| Rock cavy | K. rupestris (Wied-Neuwied, 1820) | Eastern Brazil | Size: About 30 cm (12 in) long, with no tail Habitat: Savanna and rocky areas Diet: Leaves, flowers, buds, bark and occasionally fruit | LC Unknown |

== Sources ==
- Chernasky, Amy; Motis, Anna; Burgin, Connor, eds. (2023). All the Mammals of the World. Lynx Nature Books. ISBN 978-84-16728-66-4.
- Honeycutt, Rodney L. (2013). Capybara. Springer Publishing. doi:10.1007/978-1-4614-4000-0_3. ISBN 978-1-4614-3999-8.
- Nowak, Ronald M. (1999). Walker's Mammals of the World. Vol. 2 (6th ed.). Johns Hopkins University Press. ISBN 978-0-8018-5789-8.
- Wagner, Joseph E.; Manning, Patrick J. (1976). The Biology of the Guinea Pig. Academic Press. ISBN 978-0-12-730050-4.
- Woods, Charles A.; Kilpatrick, C. William (2005). Wilson, Don E.; Reeder, DeeAnn M. (eds.). Mammal Species of the World. Vol. 2 (3rd ed.). Johns Hopkins University Press. ISBN 978-0-8018-8221-0.
