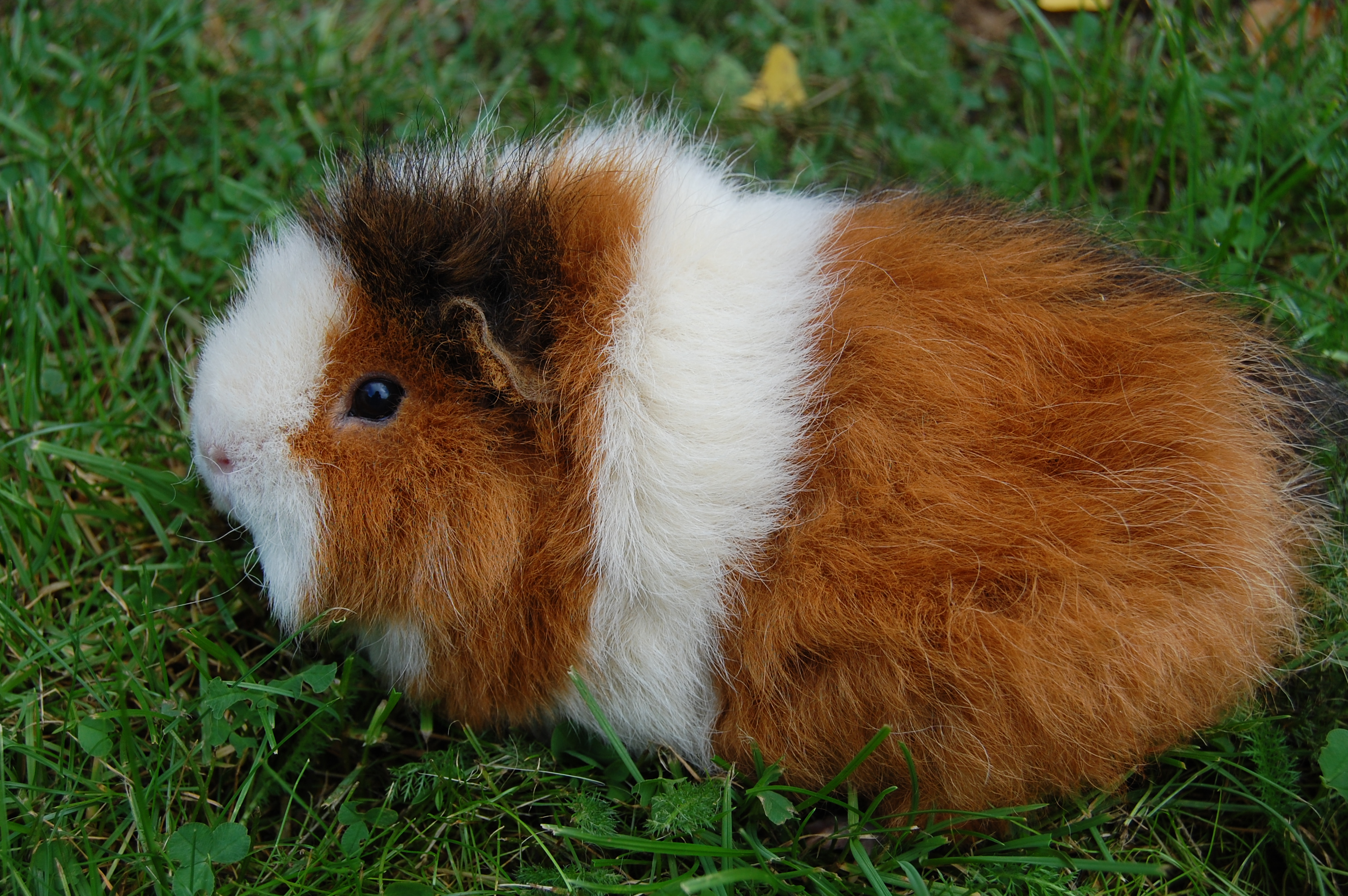
- Cavia porcellus

Scientific classification
- Kingdom: Animalia
- Phylum: Chordata
- Class: Mammalia
- Order: Rodentia
- Family: Caviidae
- Subfamily: Caviinae; Fischer de Waldheim, 1817

Genera
- †Cardiomys †Allocavia †Palaeocavia †Neocavia †Dolicavia †Macrocavia †Caviops †Pascualia; Galea; Microcavia; Cavia

= Caviinae =

Caviinae Temporal range: Late Miocene - Holocene

Subfamily of rodents

Caviinae is a subfamily uniting all living members of the family Caviidae with the exception of the maras, capybaras, and Kerodon. The subfamily traditionally contained the guinea pig or cavy-like forms along with the cursorially adapted (running) Kerodon. Molecular results suggest the Caviinae as so defined would be paraphyletic and Kerodon is more closely related to maras and capybaras than to other caviines. This led Woods and Kilpatrick (2005) to unite Kerodon and capybaras into the subfamily Hydrochoerinae within the Caviidae. These studies also suggest Microcavia and Cavia are more closely related to one another than either is to Galea.

== Genera and species ==
- Subfamily Caviinae
  - †Cardiomys
  - †Allocavia
  - †Palaeocavia
  - †Neocavia
  - †Dolicavia
  - †Macrocavia
  - †Caviops
  - †Pascualia
  - Galea - yellow-toothed cavies
    - Galea flavidens - Brandt's yellow-toothed cavy (may be an invalid species)
    - Galea monasteriensis - Muenster yellow-toothed cavy
    - Galea musteloides - common yellow-toothed cavy
    - Galea spixii - Spix's yellow-toothed cavy
  - Microcavia - mountain cavies
    - Microcavia australis - southern mountain cavy
    - Microcavia niata - Andean mountain cavy
    - Microcavia shiptoni - Shipton's mountain cavy
  - Cavia - guinea pigs
    - Cavia aperea - Brazilian guinea pig
    - Cavia fulgida - shiny guinea pig
    - Cavia intermedia - intermediate guinea pig
    - Cavia magna - greater guinea pig
    - Cavia porcellus - domestic guinea pig
    - Cavia tschudii - montane guinea pig
