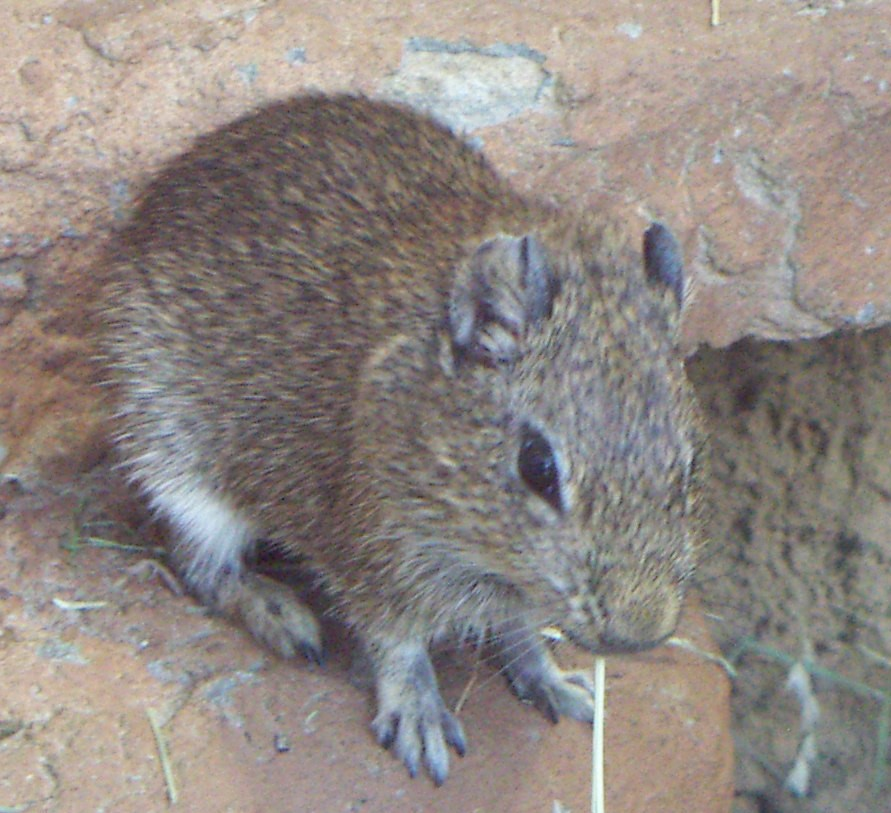

Conservation status
- Not evaluated (IUCN 3.1)

Scientific classification
- Kingdom: Animalia
- Phylum: Chordata
- Class: Mammalia
- Order: Rodentia
- Family: Caviidae
- Genus: Galea
- Species: G. monasteriensis

Binomial name
- Galea monasteriensis Solmsdorff, Kock, Hohoff & Sachser, 2004

= Muenster yellow-toothed cavy =

Species of rodent

The Muenster yellow-toothed cavy (Galea monasteriensis) is a species of rodent in the family Caviidae. It is known only from one location in Valle Hermoso in the Bolivian Andes, at an elevation of 2,557 m (8,389 ft). Specimens from this location were shipped to Muenster, Germany, in 1997 for laboratory research, where the species was recognized and described. Galea monasteriensis was recognized on the basis of morphological, behavioral, and reproductive differences from related species. However, its habits in the wild have not been studied.

Since 2016, the IUCN has regarded this population as a subspecies of the common yellow-toothed cavy, i.e. as Galea musteloides ssp. monasteriensis.

Unlike the common yellow-toothed cavy and Spix's yellow-toothed cavy, Muenster yellow-toothed cavy males engage in social play with their offspring and groom them rather than being aggressive. When mothers of this species and their pups are put into a strange environment, the presence of the mothers mitigates increases in blood cortisol levels in their pups; however, this is not observed when the pups are moved together with other mothers that are not their own. G. monasteriensis is both sexually and socially monogamous. Both males and females of G. monasteriensis defend their territories and care for their pups.
