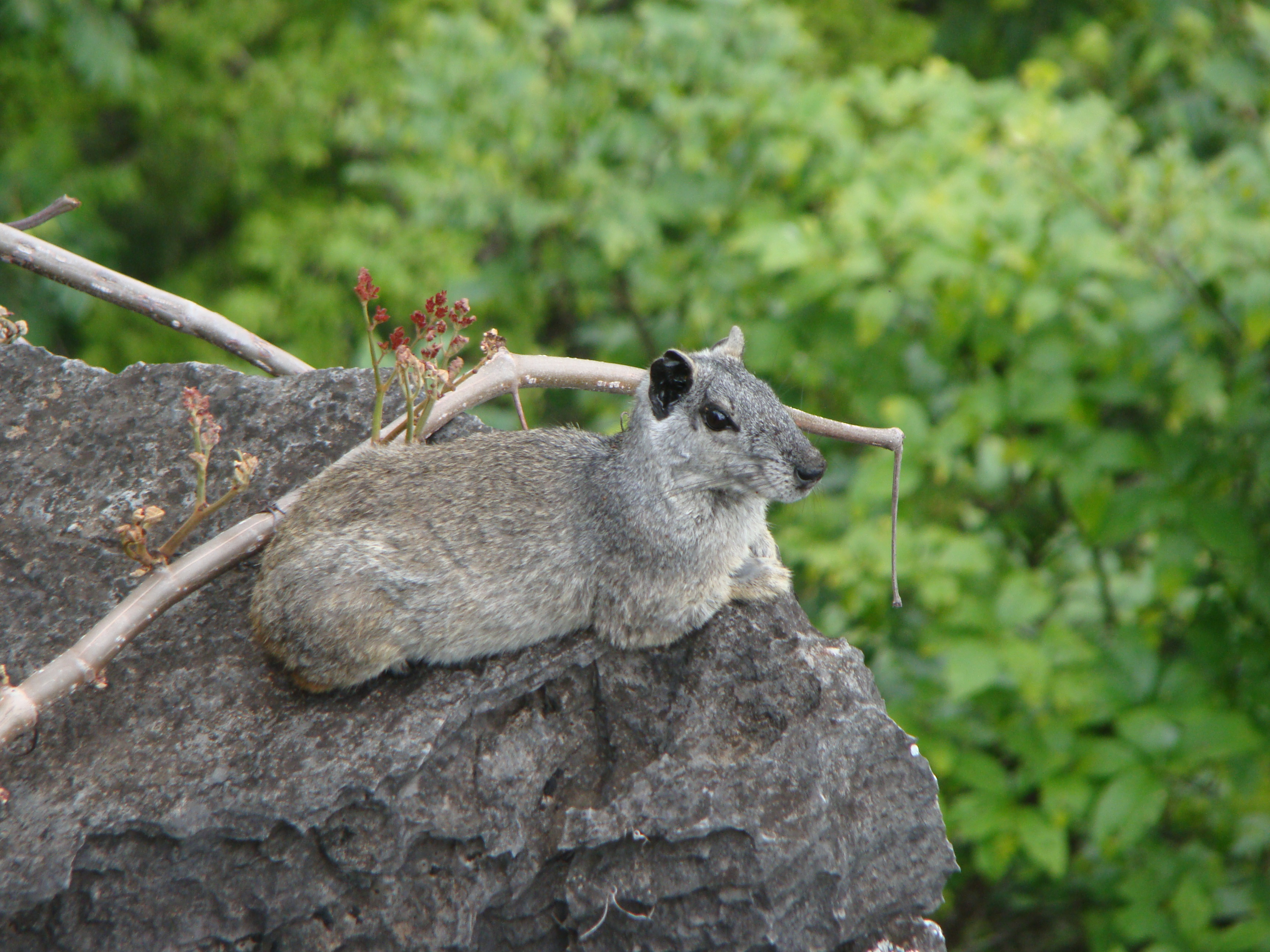

Conservation status
- Data Deficient (IUCN 3.1)

Scientific classification
- Kingdom: Animalia
- Phylum: Chordata
- Class: Mammalia
- Infraclass: Placentalia
- Order: Rodentia
- Family: Caviidae
- Genus: Kerodon
- Species: K. acrobata

Binomial name
- Kerodon acrobata Moojen et al., 1997
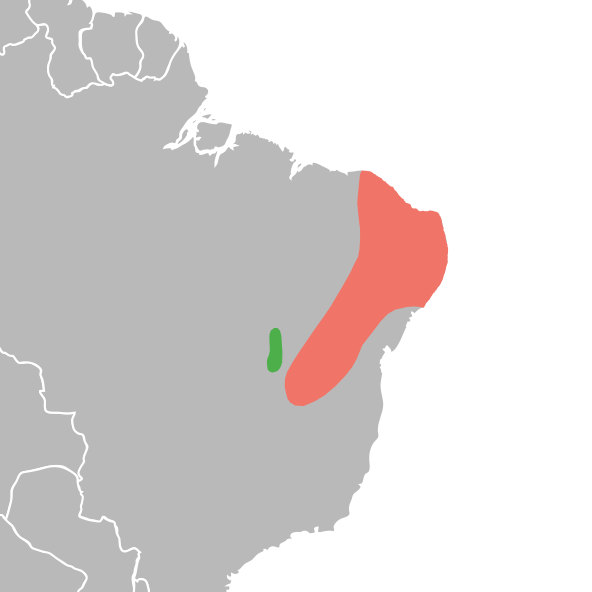
- Kerodon distribution K. rupestris in red, K. acrobata in green

= Acrobatic cavy =

Species of rodent

The acrobatic cavy (Kerodon acrobata) also known as the acrobatic moco and climbing cavy is a cavy species native to Brazil. It is found from Goiás state to Tocantins state, west of the Espigão Mestre, Serra Geral de Goiás, and is also found in Terra Ronca State Park.

== Diet ==
They are herbivores known to eat a generalized diet of leaves, flowers, bud, bark and fruit from 16 different types of native plantations.

== Habitat ==
Found in fragments of dry forest associated with limestone outcrops in the Cerrado savanna of central Brazil.

== Appearance ==
Acrobatic cavies are a large rodent averaging 1 kg in weight, their fur ranges from dark grey to light brown with orange-brown feet, mostly observed on hindfeet. Their tails are vestigial.

== Phylogeny ==
The acrobatic cavy belongs to the order Rodentia, in the family Caviidae (guinea-pig like rodents) which has two subfamilies (formerly three) with acrobatic cavies being in a new subfamily Hydrochaerinae alongside capybaras and the closely related rock cavy from eastern Brazil.
