= Barbara Weir (scientist) =

British scientist, editor and adventurer

Dr. Barbara J. Weir was a scientist, adventurer, and editor from the United Kingdom. Her discovery and extensive study of estrus in Galea musteloides illuminated the workings of some rodents' reproductive systems. Barbara Weir is most recognized for her comparative study on the breeding habits of Cavia aperea, and two related species, Galea musteloides, and Microcavia australis. Weir was also an editor for the Journal of Reproduction and Fertility from 1976 to 1990 where she was recognized for her "firm and fair role" as editor.

== Personal life and education ==
Weir was born in 1942 in the United Kingdom. She graduated with her M.A. in Natural Science and Ph.D. from Cambridge University.

Weir died on December 22, 1993, in Hoxton, London, due to a chronic illness she chose not to share publicly.

== Career ==
=== Hystricomorphs ===
Barbara Weir was a pioneer of the study of reproductive biology of hystricomorpha rodents at the Wellcome Institute of Comparative Physiology, part of the Zoological Society of London. While there, Weir expanded studies of estrus induction in female chinchillas (Chinchilla chinchilla) and female guinea pigs (Cavia porcellus). Weir worked at Cambridge University in 1968, where she completed doctoral work on chinchillas (Chinchilla chinchilla) and their relatives and conducted several field expeditions to Argentina, Bolivia, and Peru. This was extraordinary in a time when women were not expected or often allowed to be field biologists. She found that female cavies (Cavia porcellus) undergo estrus—and thus reproduce—unless they are in contact with a male cavy (Cavia porcellus). Weir also found that chinchillas follow this pattern, but that a regimen of exogenous gonadotropins can induce estrus and ovulation in chinchillas.

=== Journal of Reproduction ===
Weir joined the Journal of Reproduction and Fertility (now Reproduction) as its editor in 1973 and held that position until 1991. The journal produced more than 50 volumes during that period, including many significant editions on equine reproduction. Her death came during her work on the Fifth International Equine Reproduction Symposium; she edited and produced the preceding 4 volumes of the symposia.
