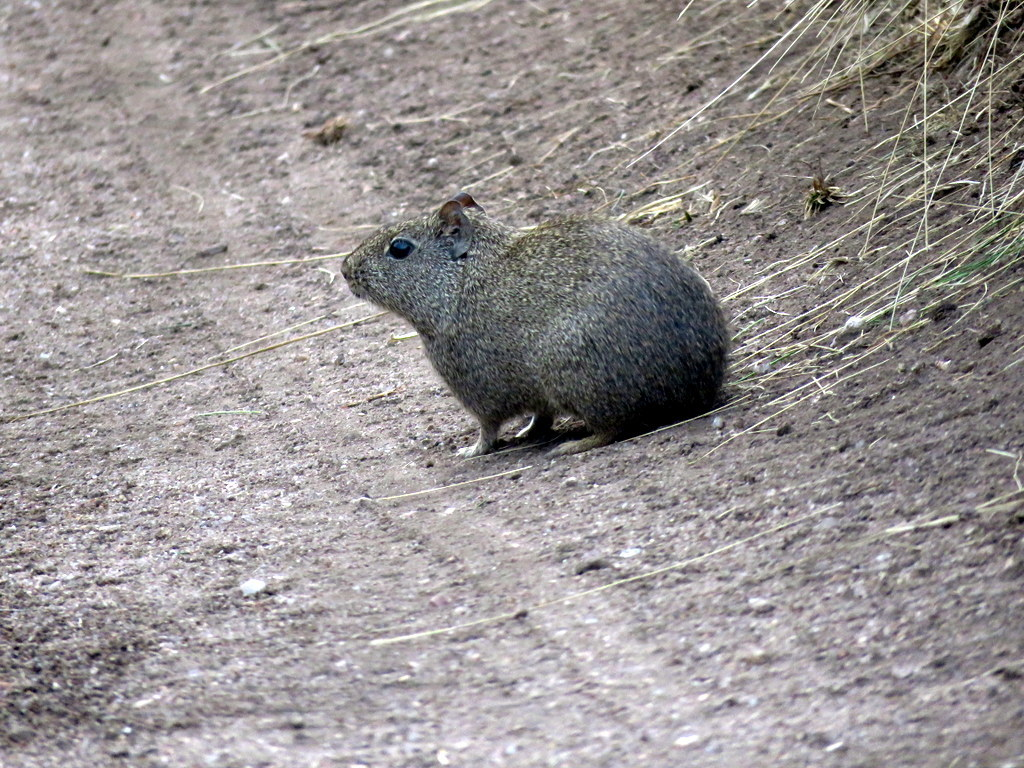

Conservation status
- Least Concern (IUCN 3.1)

Scientific classification
- Kingdom: Animalia
- Phylum: Chordata
- Class: Mammalia
- Order: Rodentia
- Family: Caviidae
- Genus: Galea
- Species: G. leucoblephara

Binomial name
- Galea leucoblephara (Burmeister, 1861)
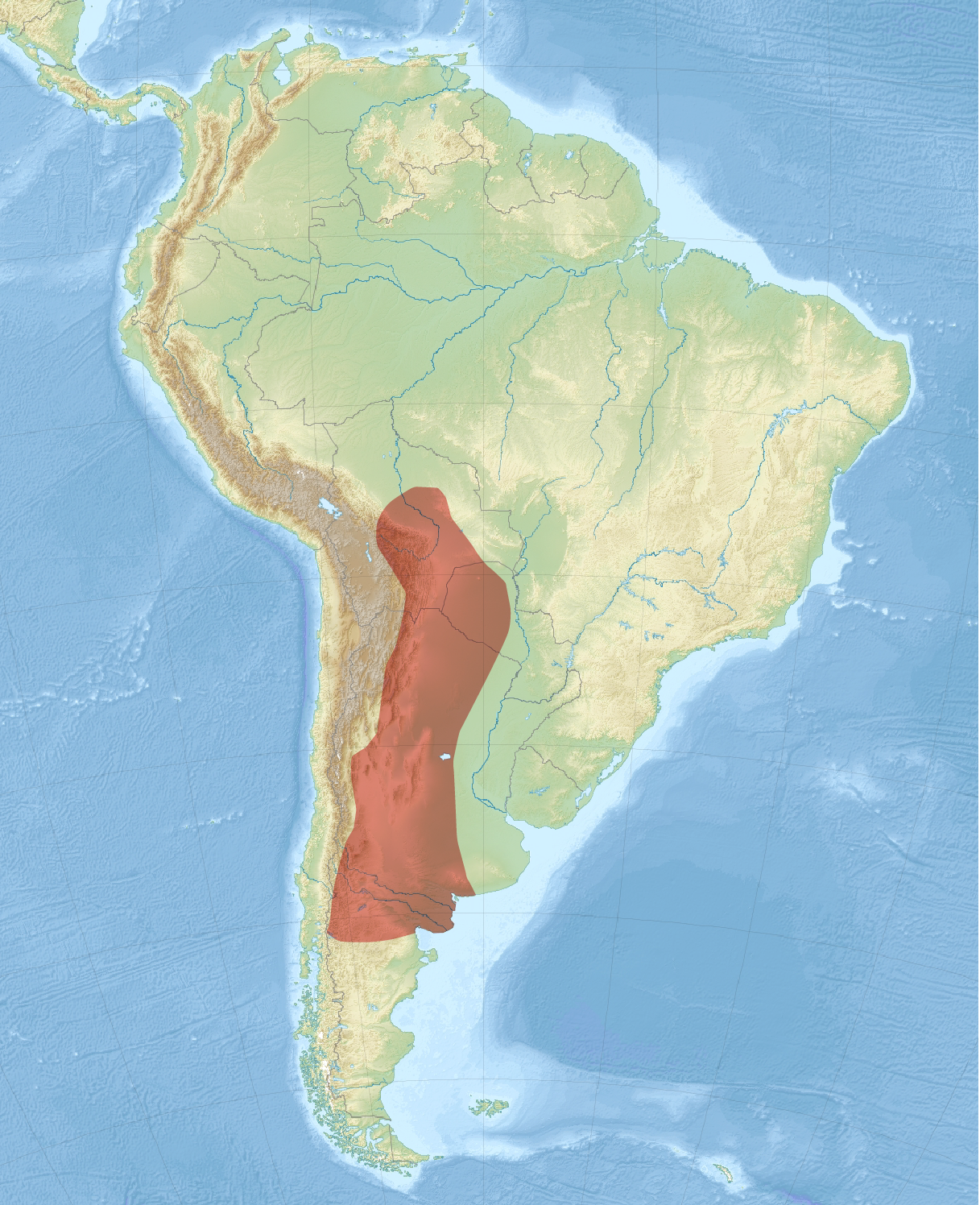

Synonyms
- Galea musteloides leucoblephara

= Lowland yellow-toothed cavy =

Species of rodent

Galea leucoblephara, commonly known as the lowland yellow-toothed cavy, is a species of rodent in the family Caviidae. It is native to southern South America, specifically Argentina, Bolivia and Paraguay. The species was once considered part of Galea musteloides but is now a separate species.
