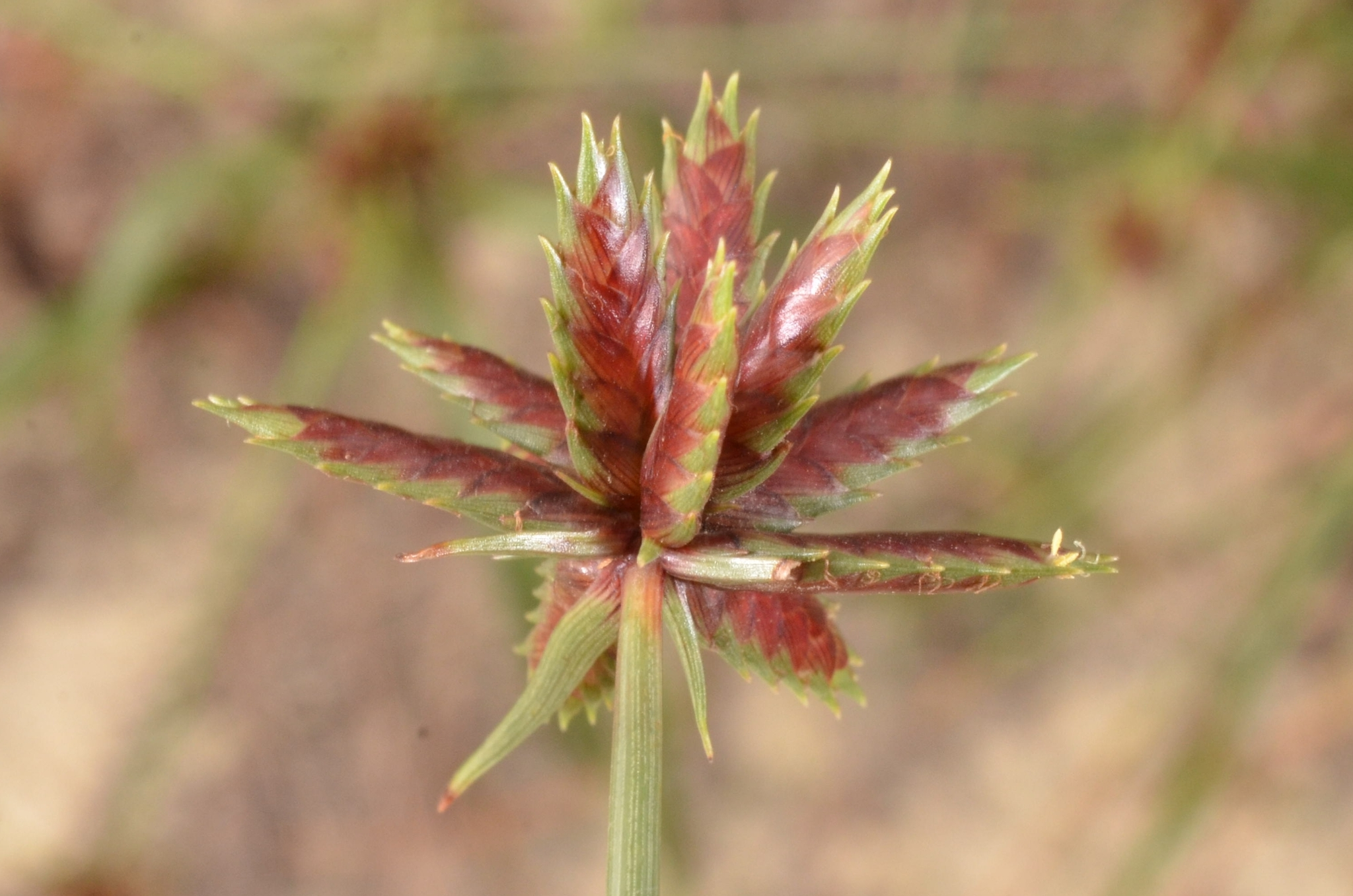
- In Vietnam

Scientific classification
- Kingdom: Plantae
- Clade: Embryophytes
- Clade: Tracheophytes
- Clade: Spermatophytes
- Clade: Angiosperms
- Clade: Monocots
- Clade: Commelinids
- Order: Poales
- Family: Cyperaceae
- Genus: Cyperus
- Species: C. radians

Binomial name
- Cyperus radians Nees & Meyen ex Kunth

= Cyperus radians =

Species of sedge

Cyperus radians is a species of sedge that is native to eastern parts of Asia.

== See also ==
- List of Cyperus species
