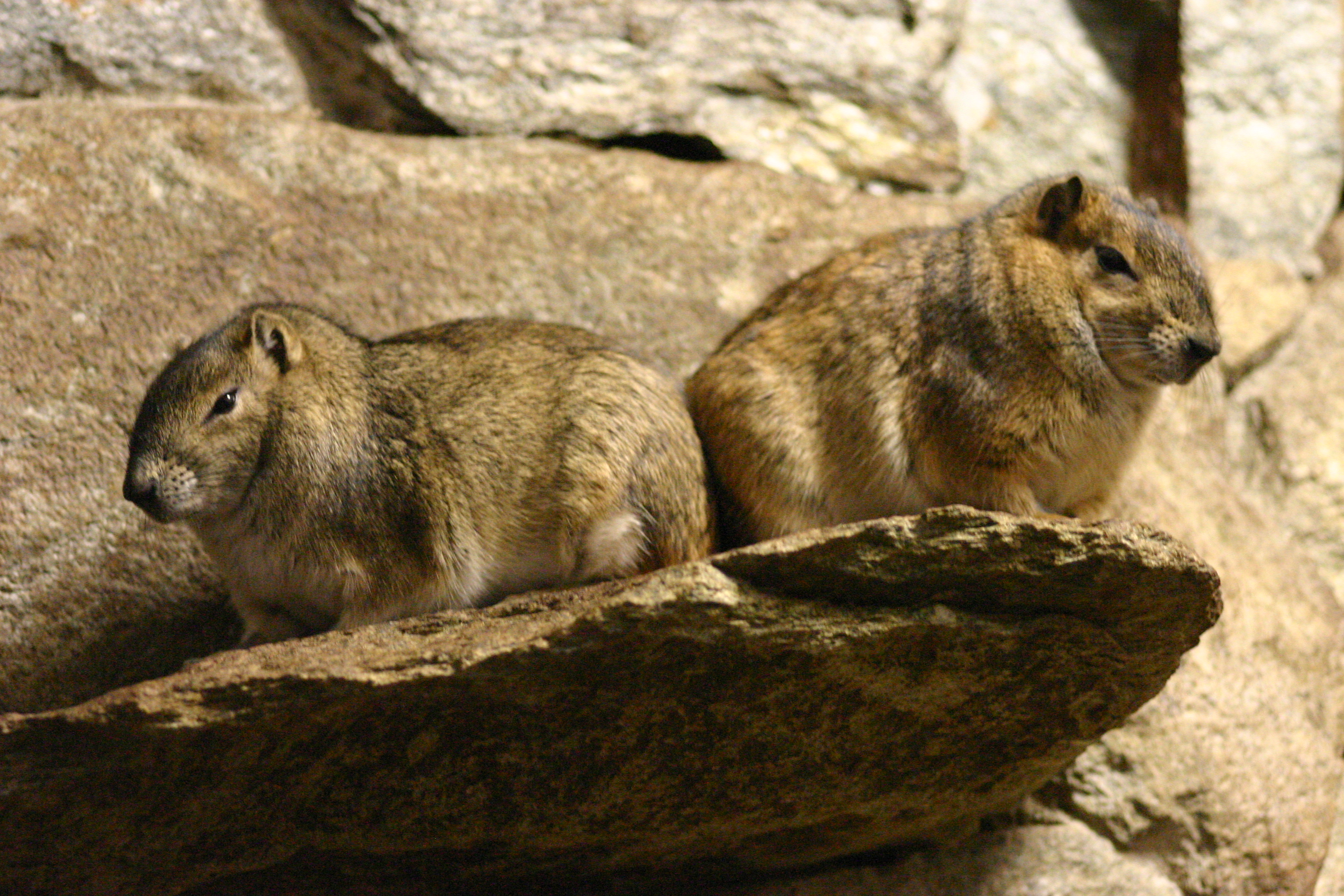

Conservation status
- Least Concern (IUCN 3.1)

Scientific classification
- Kingdom: Animalia
- Phylum: Chordata
- Class: Mammalia
- Order: Rodentia
- Family: Caviidae
- Genus: Kerodon
- Species: K. rupestris

Binomial name
- Kerodon rupestris (Wied-Neuwied, 1820)
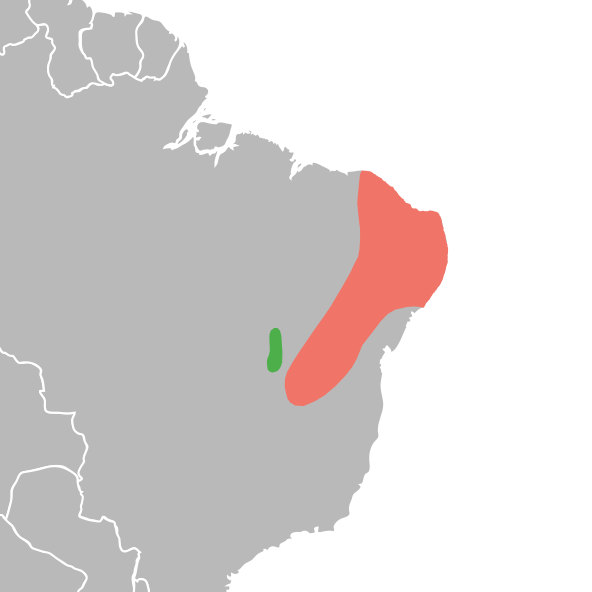
- Kerodon distribution K. rupestris in red, K. acrobata in green

= Rock cavy =

Species of rodent

The rock cavy or mocó (Kerodon rupestris) is a species of cavy that is endemic to eastern Brazil. It has also been introduced to the Atlantic island of Fernando de Noronha.

The rock cavy is called mocó in Brazilian Portuguese, and koriko pexerumen in the Xukuru language of Pernambuco, Brazil.

== Description ==
The rock cavy is a fairly large rodent weighing up to 1 kg (2.2 lb). Like other cavy species, their tails are vestigial or absent. Their backs are grey-brown and their bellies tan to light brown.

In appearance and habit, they closely resemble the unrelated African rock hyraxes (an example of convergent evolution). They are herbivorous, feeding on seeds and leaves of the scrubby vegetation that grows in their territories. This vegetation consists of tender leaves and certain species of creeper.

== Distribution and habitat ==
Rock cavies are found in dry, rocky areas with low, scrubby vegetation, and they prefer to reside close to stony mountainsides and hills. They are native to eastern Brazil, from eastern Piauí state to Minas Gerais state, and have been introduced to the island of Fernando de Noronha, off the eastern coast of Brazil.

== Phylogeny ==
Rock cavies belong to the order Rodentia, suborder Hystricomorpha, based on their porcupine-like jaw muscles. They are in the family Caviidae (guinea pig-like rodents), which has three subfamilies (formerly two); rock cavies have recently been placed in a new subfamily Hydrochoerinae, with the capybaras, and with the closely related rainforest-dwelling acrobatic cavy.

== Behavior ==
Rock cavies usually shelter in crevices. They may be seen resting at all times of day, but are crepuscular – active mostly at dawn and dusk. They are able to climb, which makes reaching leaves, seeds, and occasional fruits easier.

Rock cavies live in groups, centered around rock-sheltered dens. Each rock cavy group has an alpha or dominant male and several females. The males are territorial, defending rock pile shelters against other adult males. The rock piles are chosen to impress the females; once a female chooses a rock pile, she indirectly chooses its guardian as her mate.

They can sometimes display homosexual behavior, with males courting other males. Some paedophilic behavior has also been displayed, with adult males courting juvenile males.

Studies show that rock cavies have a direct link between their retina and the mediodorsal nucleus in the thalamus, which may provide them with strong visual recognition, emotional learning, and/or enhanced object-reward associative memory. This may partly explain why they are found living in large groups.

=== Reproduction ===
Females weigh 700-800 g and give birth to only one or two young, but several litters per year are common. The gestation period averages 75 days. The newborn cavies weigh 90 g.

The placenta for a rock cavy is similar to other hystricomorph rodents: They have several lobes that are lined with blood vessels and undergo a counter-current blood flow. Blood vessels run from the mother along the placenta and then vessels run from the fetus back over the mother's vessels. This allows for a better flow of oxygen between the mother and the fetus. (Note: The most unique feature of the rock cavy placenta is the presence of a subplacenta. Its function is not completely known, but may have a role in hormone secretion. The vessels from the mother and fetus occur in different places in the subplacenta, so it is not used for counter-current exchange.)

=== Parental care ===
The young are able to eat solid food at 3 days old, but continue to nurse for up to 7 weeks. The milk produced for these young is very dense in energy. This may be due to the lack of water availability in their environment.

Both male and female rock cavies care for their young. When both parents are present, the females spend more time with their young than the males do. When the male is absent, the females spend more time with their young than they do when the male is present. Females that raise young on their own are more aggressive than females that raise the young with a partner. The young raised by single mothers also gain more weight while nursing compared to those raised by both parents.

== Threats and protection ==
Rock cavies are endemic to several protected areas, and reproduce quickly, so they are currently listed as "least concern" on the IUCN Red List. They are frequently hunted as food by humans, which resulted in population decline of 30% in the last 10 years. Their range is also being reduced due to deforestation. Efforts are underway to breed rock cavies in captivity as a potential food source.
