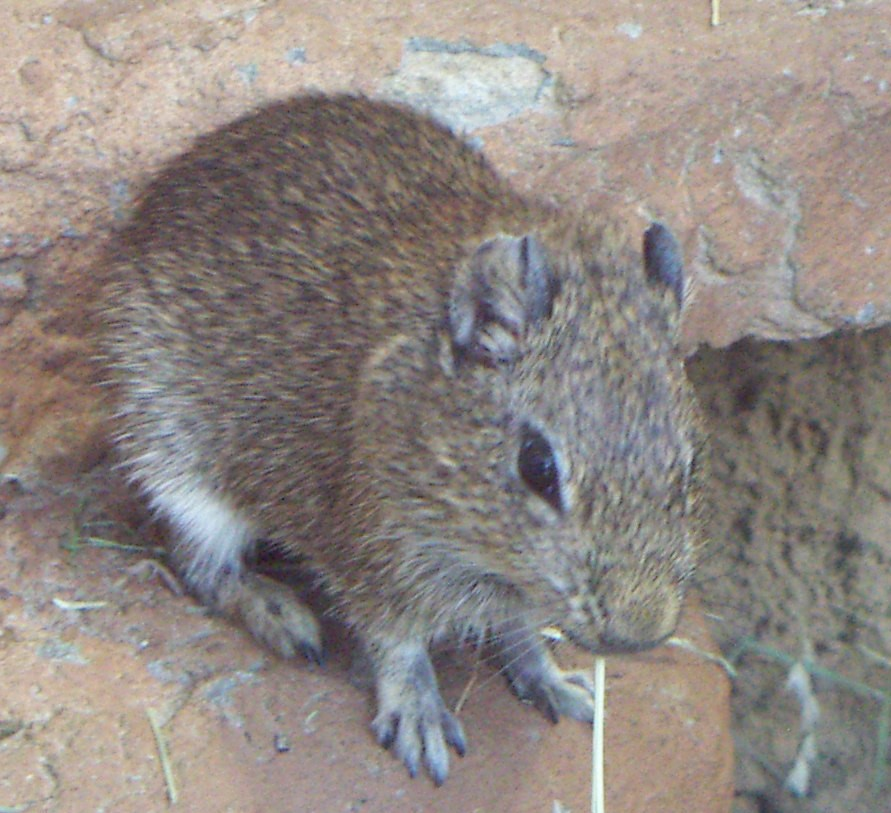
- G. monasteriensis

Scientific classification
- Kingdom: Animalia
- Phylum: Chordata
- Class: Mammalia
- Infraclass: Placentalia
- Order: Rodentia
- Family: Caviidae
- Subfamily: Caviinae
- Genus: Galea; Meyen, 1832

Type species
- Galea musteloides Meyen, 1832

Species
- Galea comes Galea flavidens Galea leucoblephara Galea musteloides Galea spixii
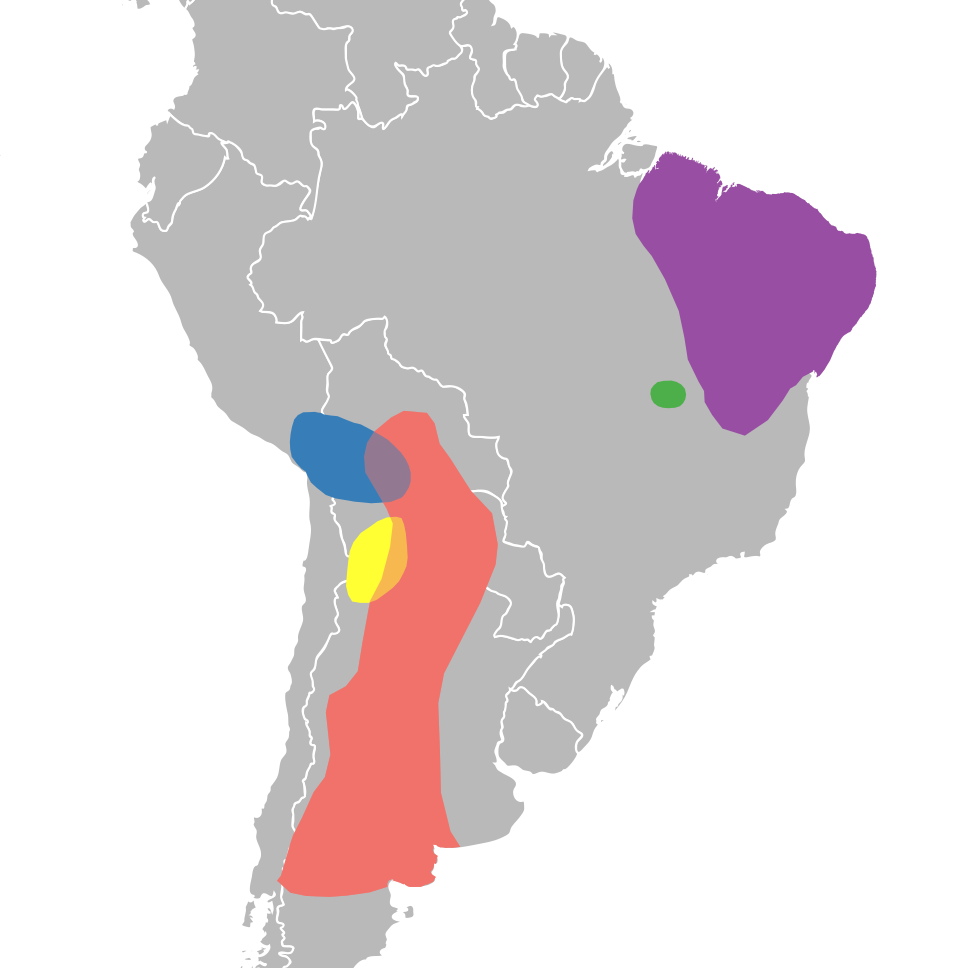
- Galea distribution G. comes in yellow, G. flavidens in green, G. leucoblephara in red, G. musteloides in blue, G. spixii in purple

= Galea (genus) =

Galea Temporal range: Recent

Genus of rodents

Galea is a genus of South American rodents of the family Caviidae. 5-6 extant species are known, found in Argentina, Bolivia, Chile, Peru and Brazil. They are:

- Southern highland yellow-toothed cavy (G. comes)
- Brazilian yellow-toothed cavy (G. flavidens)
- Lowland yellow-toothed cavy (G. leucoblephara)
- Common yellow-toothed cavy (G. musteloides)
  - Muenster yellow-toothed cavy (G. m. monasteriensis or G. monasteriensis?)
- Spix's yellow-toothed cavy (G. spixii)

Galea has until recently been considered to have only three species; the Muenster yellow-toothed cavy was only described in 2004. G. flavidens is monotypic and G. musteloides and G. spixii are polytypic.

Galea is in the family Caviidae and its members are described as cavies; they have sometimes also been called "guinea pigs". Cavies are widespread throughout South America. The high diversity of habitats of different species is paralleled by a high diversity of social organizations. Species differences between habitats and reproduction may shed light on evolutionary history.

Galea breeds at multiple times of year that are not strongly constrained by food availability or climate. The gestation period is 48 days and litter size is 2 to 4, both less than those of the guinea pig. Placental development in Galea is very similar to that of the guinea pig.

Galea species usually have smaller body size but the relative sizes of their testes and epididymis are twice those of Cavia species. In the majority of cases, the acrosomes of Galea sperm are smooth in outline, and only occasionally are degenerate forms present or are the acrosomes absent. In Galea, the spermatozoa of the epididymis are always single-cell whereas those of Cavia are agglutinated in the form of rouleaux. Galea spermatozoa swim more slowly than those of Cavia. While some Galea species are promiscuous—for example G. musteloides—Cavia exhibits polygynous behavior, which means that males are selected for aggression so that multiple matings will be prohibited.
