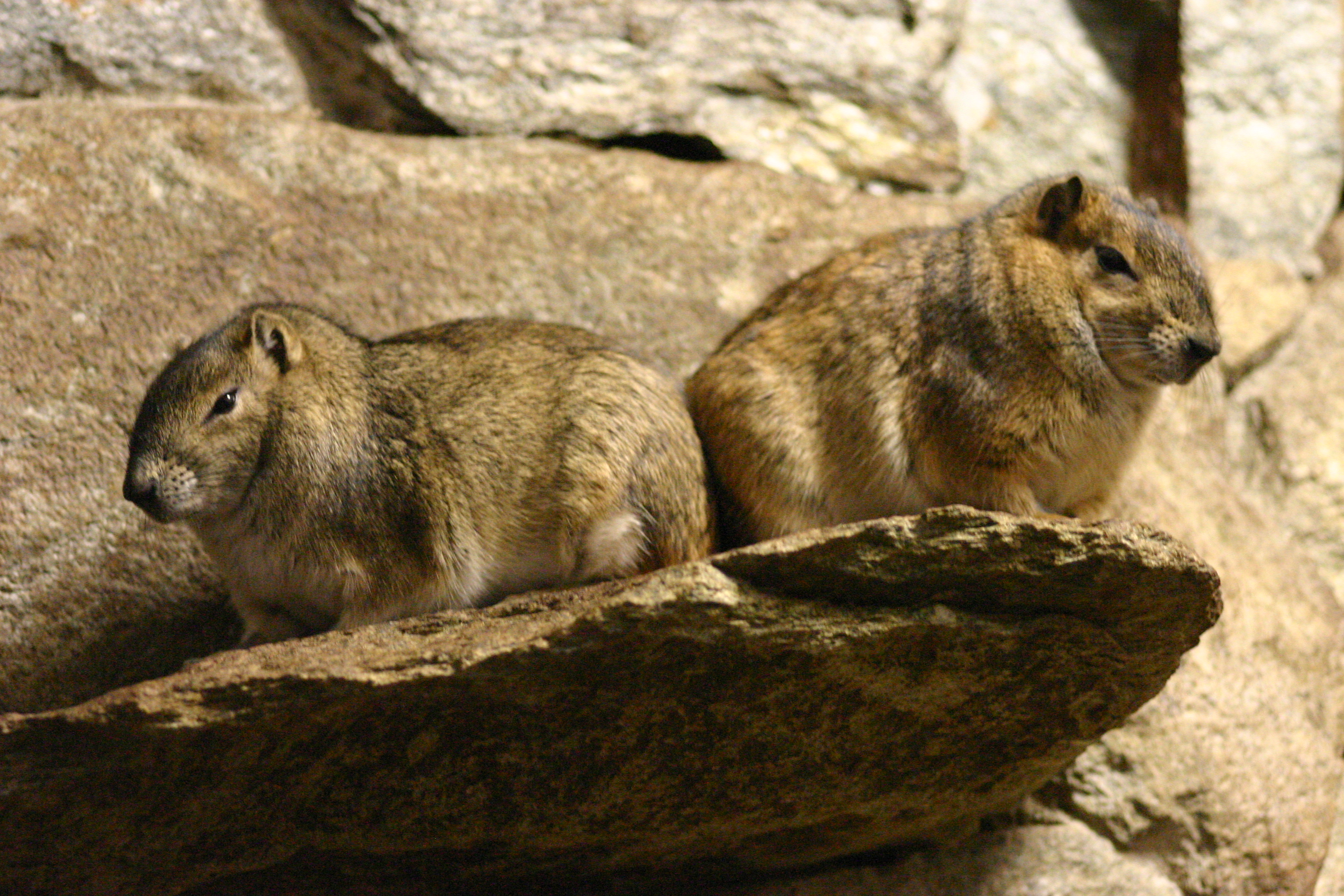
- Rock cavy (Kerodon rupestris)

Scientific classification
- Kingdom: Animalia
- Phylum: Chordata
- Class: Mammalia
- Infraclass: Placentalia
- Order: Rodentia
- Family: Caviidae
- Subfamily: Hydrochoerinae
- Genus: Kerodon; F. Cuvier, 1825

Type species
- Kerodon moco Lesson, 1827 (= Cavia rupestris Wied-Neuwied, 1820)

Species
- Kerodon acrobata Kerodon rupestris
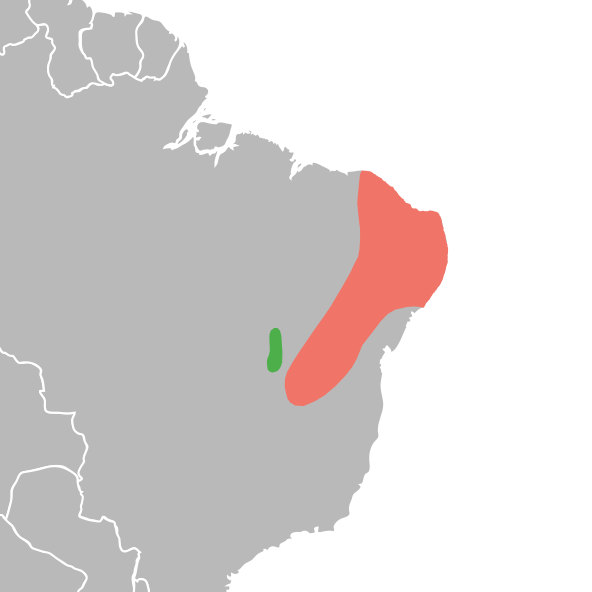
- Kerodon distribution K. rupestris in red, K. acrobata in green

= Kerodon =

Kerodon Temporal range: Late Pleistocene - recent

Genus of rodents

The genus Kerodon (vernacular name mocos; rock cavies) contains two species of South American cavies, the rock cavy and the acrobatic cavy. They are found in the semiarid regions of northeast Brazil known as the Caatinga. This area has a rocky terrain with large granite boulders that contain rifts and hollows where Kerodon species primarily live. They are related to capybaras and guinea pigs.

== Characteristics ==
They are hystricomorph rodents, medium-sized, with rabbit-like bodies, a squirrel-like face, and heavily padded feet. Their nails are blunt on all digits except a small grooming claw on the outermost digit of the foot. Fully grown adults weigh around 1000 g or 31–35 oz, and range in length from 200 to 400 mm or 7.5 to 16 in. They forage for mostly leaves, grasses, seeds, and tree bark. They breed year round, usually having one to three litters per year and one to three young per pregnancy. Gestation last around 76 days and the young are weaned from the mother within 33 days. They reach sexual maturity at 133 days.

== Behavior ==
Like their relatives, the capybaras and the maras, members of the genus Kerodon are highly social. Kerodon species, like capybaras, are polygynous, with males forming harems. They are very vocal creatures and produce various whistles, chirps, and squeaks. Males establish ownership over one or several rock piles and defend their territories. Within each group, a hierarchical structure exists. They are primarily active during dawn and dusk.

== Classification ==
Traditionally, the genus Kerodon has been considered a member of the subfamily Caviinae along with the guinea pigs and other cavies. Molecular results have consistently suggested Kerodon is most closely related to the capybara, and the two evolved from within the Caviidae. This led Woods and Kilpatrick (2005) to unite the two into the subfamily Hydrochoerinae within the Caviidae. Using a molecular clock approach, Opazo suggested Kerodon diverged from Hydrochoerus (the capybara) in the late Middle Miocene.

== Species ==
- Kerodon acrobata Moojen, Locks & Langguth, 1997 – climbing cavy
- Kerodon rupestris Wied-Neuwied, 1820 – rock cavy
