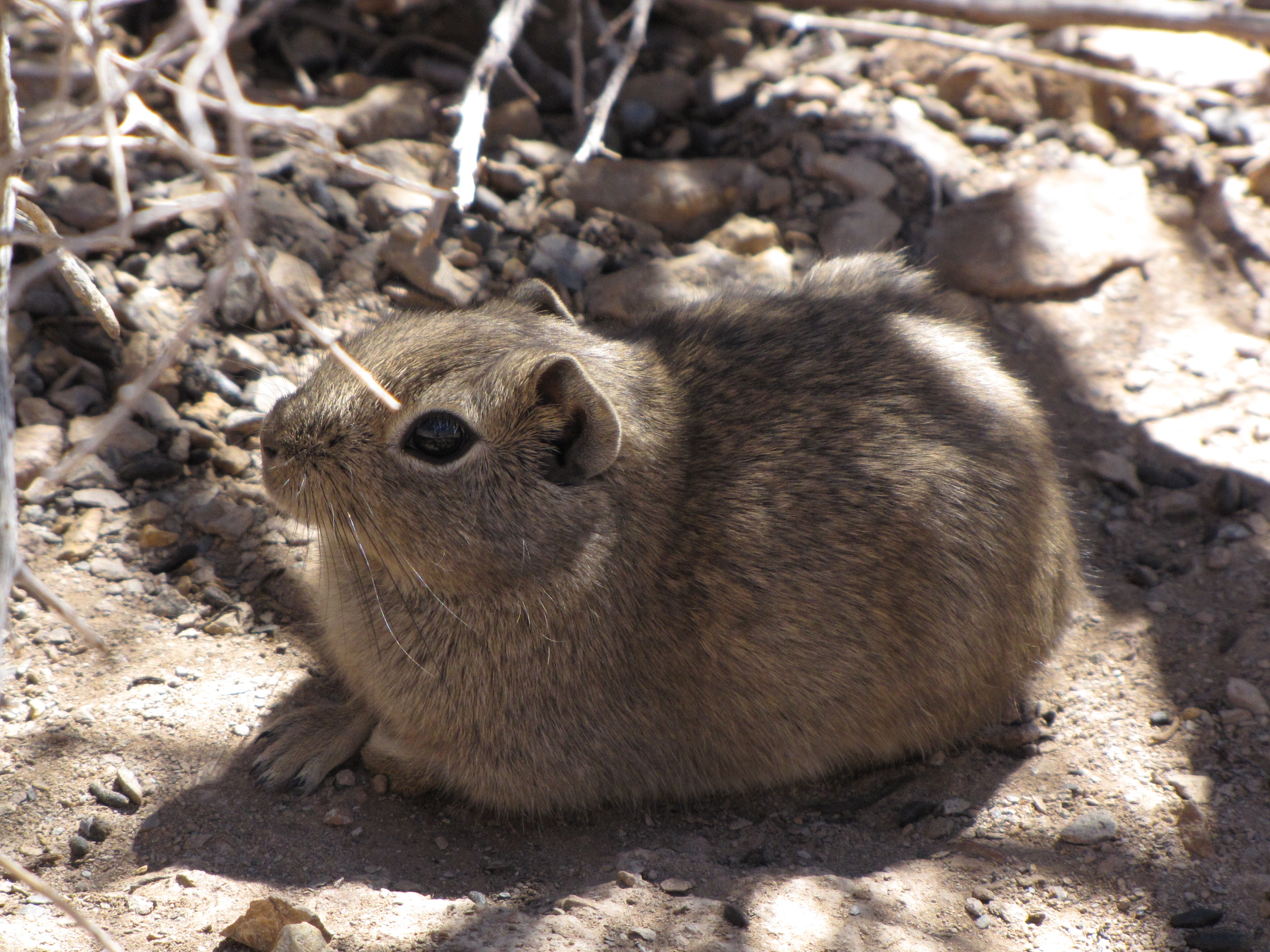

Conservation status
- Least Concern (IUCN 3.1)

Scientific classification
- Kingdom: Animalia
- Phylum: Chordata
- Class: Mammalia
- Order: Rodentia
- Family: Caviidae
- Genus: Microcavia
- Species: M. australis

Binomial name
- Microcavia australis (I. Geoffroy & d'Orbigny, 1833)
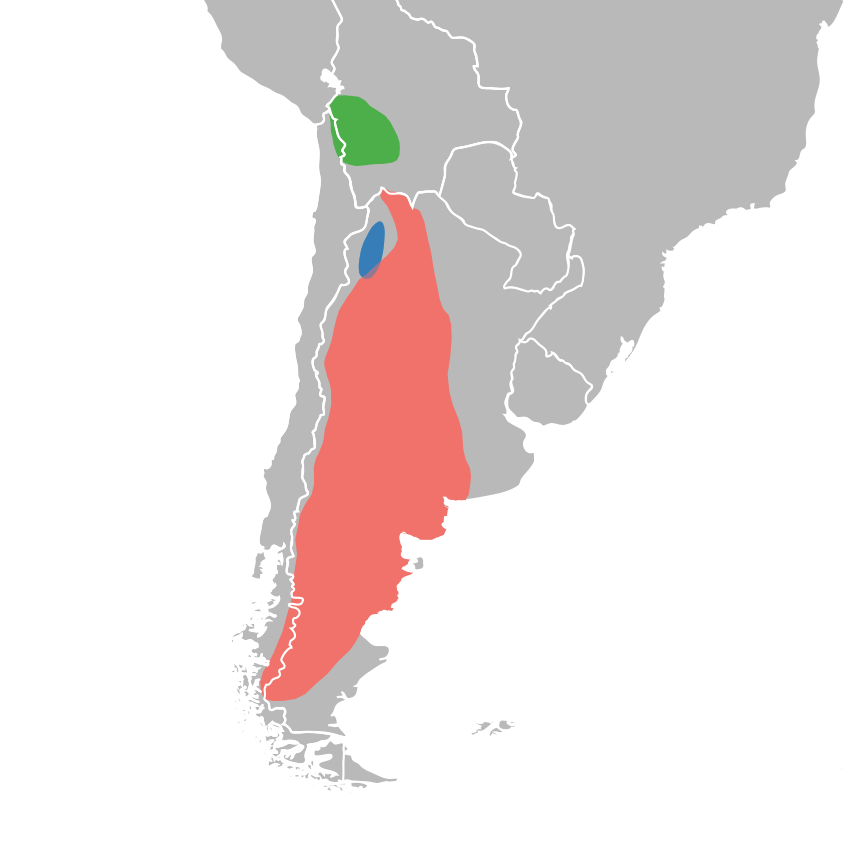
- Microcavia distribution M. australis in red

= Southern mountain cavy =

Species of rodent

The southern mountain cavy (Microcavia australis) is a species of South American rodent in the family Caviidae.

== Description ==
Southern mountain cavies are tailless rodents with short, speckled, greyish-yellow fur, fading to pale grey on the underparts. Adults measure around 20 cm (7.9 in) in total length and weigh between 200 and 326 g (7.1 and 11.5 oz). They have large eyes surrounded by a prominent white ring, and small rounded ears. Females have four teats.

== Distribution and habitat ==
Southern mountain cavies are largely restricted to Argentina, but may also be found in some neighbouring regions of Chile and Bolivia. They are found across almost the whole of western and southern Argentina, where they inhabit arid and semiarid lowlands, often close to rivers or in areas dominated by thorn bushes. Three subspecies are currently recognised:

- M. a. australis - central western to southern Argentina, from San Juan to Santa Cruz, and parts of southeastern Chile
- M. a. maenas - northwest Argentina, from Jujuy to La Rioja, and extreme southern Bolivia
- M. a. salinia - western Argentina, from Catamarca and Santiago del Estero to Córdoba

== Biology and behaviour ==
Southern mountain cavies eat leaves, fruits and other plant material, with mesquite and Capparis being reported as particularly common foods. They can even climb trees to get at the leaves, sometimes reaching as high as 4 m (13 ft) above the ground. In times of hardship, however, they will eat almost any plants, for example gnawing on the bark of creosote bushes.

They live in colonial burrows with anything from 4 to 38 individuals. Such burrows can be extensive, with one being reported to have 26 entrances, and a total length of 42 m (138 ft). They are diurnal, emerging from the burrows at sunrise, and remaining active throughout the day, except in particularly hot weather. Males are often aggressive towards one another, creating a strict dominance hierarchy within the burrow. Nonetheless, in severe weather or when there are few shelter sites, individuals, especially females, may huddle together, and the females have also been seen to nurse young cooperatively.

Natural predators include owls, hawks, grisons, foxes, and skunks, and southern mountain cavies alert one another of danger with low-pitched alarm calls. Other calls include a high-pitched cry of fear and soft, almost inaudible, squeaks used during chases and courtship.

Breeding occurs between August and April, with litters of one to five young being born about 54 days later. The young weigh about 30 g (1.1 oz) at birth, and are able to run almost immediately. They are weaned at around three weeks, and females may be sexually mature at just 40 to 50 days old.
