= Brazilian yellow-toothed cavy =

Conservation status
- Least Concern (IUCN 3.1)

Scientific classification
- Kingdom: Animalia
- Phylum: Chordata
- Class: Mammalia
- Order: Rodentia
- Family: Caviidae
- Genus: Galea
- Species: G. flavidens

Binomial name
- Galea flavidens Brandt, 1835
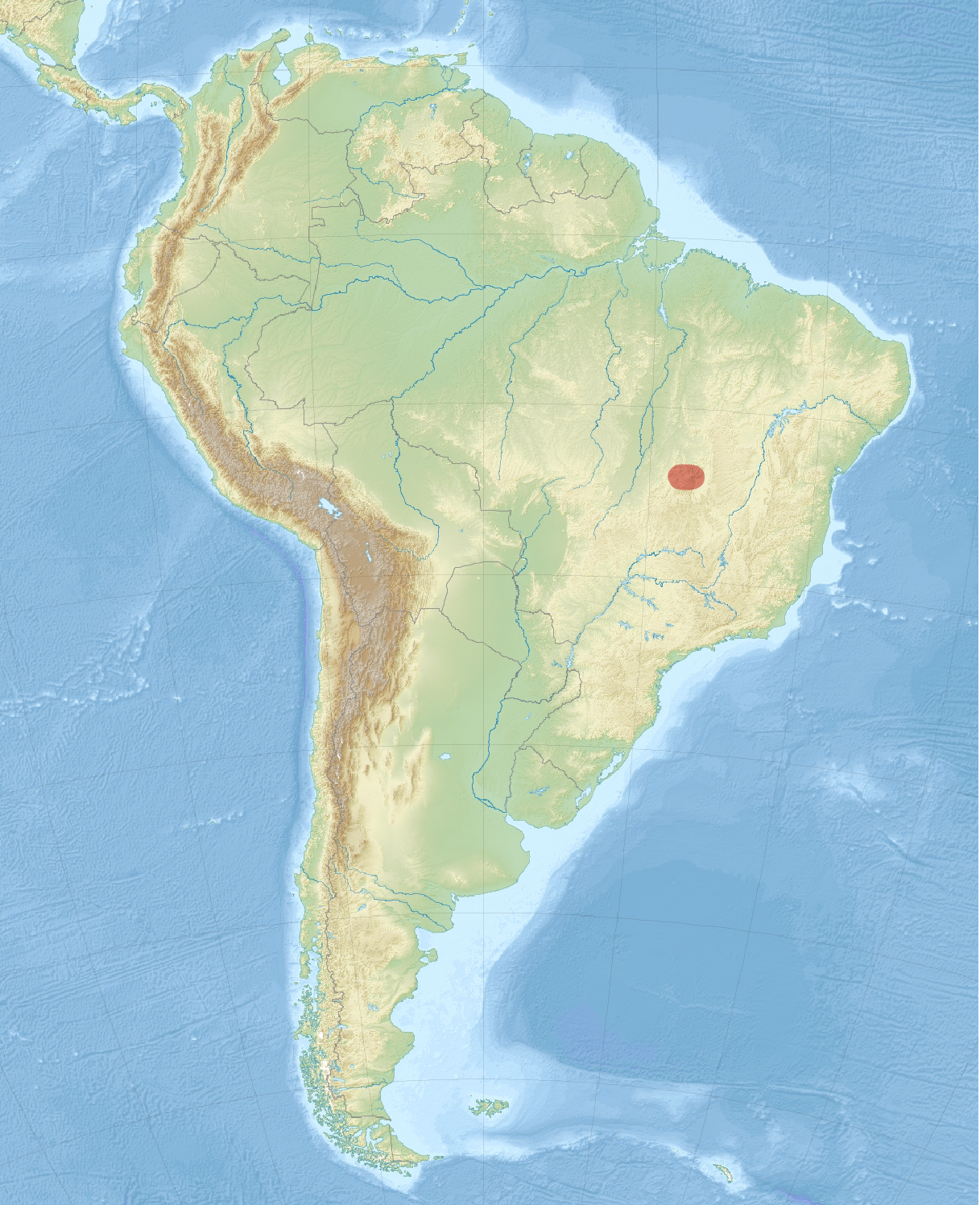
- Brazilian Yellow-Toothed Cavy Range Map

Species of rodent

The Brazilian yellow-toothed cavy (Galea flavidens) is a cavy species from South America. It is found in Brazil.

Galea flavidens is a yellow-toothed-cavy. G. flavidens lives in Brazil. This species is listed by the IUCN as Least Concern, in spite of the fact that there have been only few observations. Its habitat is widespread and the animal highly migratory, therefore there is no immediate threat to the population as a whole. As nearly with any other species, human expansion may become a problem in the near future. G. flavidens seem to be highly promiscuous, females regularly mate with multiple partners. In more than 90 percent of litters with more than one offspring the littermates have more than one father.
