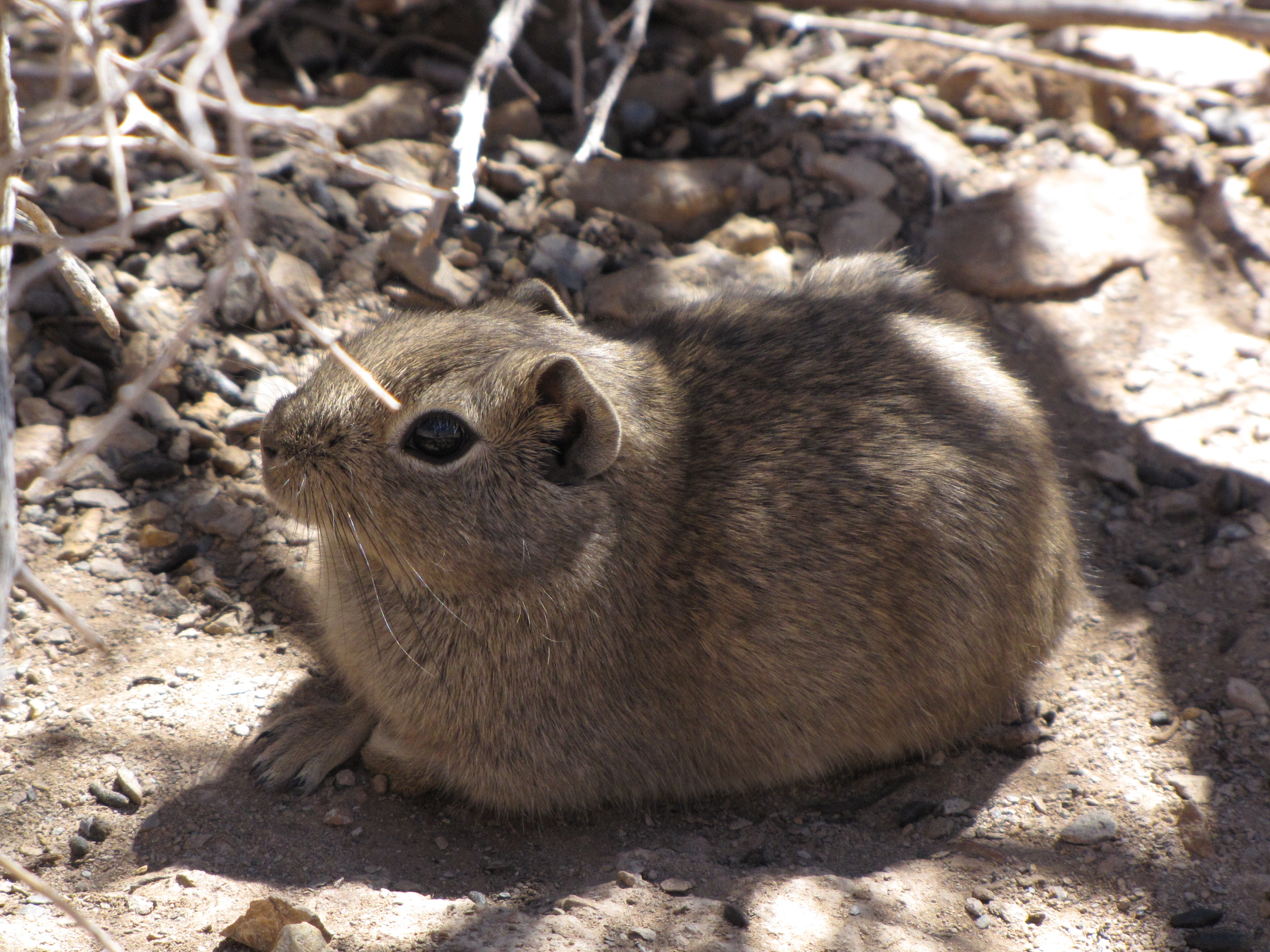
- Southern mountain cavy (Microcavia australis)

Scientific classification
- Kingdom: Animalia
- Phylum: Chordata
- Class: Mammalia
- Infraclass: Placentalia
- Order: Rodentia
- Family: Caviidae
- Subfamily: Caviinae
- Genus: Microcavia; Gervais & Ameghino, 1880

Type species
- Microcavia typus † Gervais & Ameghino, 1880
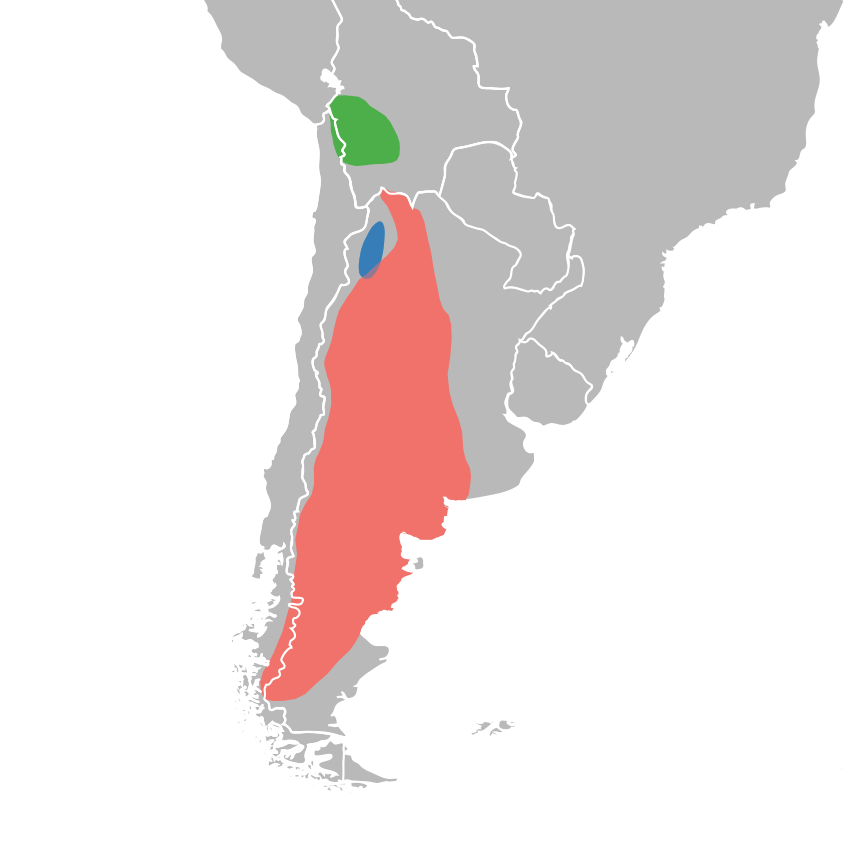
- Microcavia distribution M. niata in green, M. australis in red, M. shiptoni in blue

= Microcavia =

Genus of rodents

Microcavia (mountain cavies) is a genus of rodents in the family Caviidae. They are unique within their family in that their premolar teeth do not grow and replace the original deciduous cheek teeth until after the animal is born; in other genera this occurs in the womb.

It contains six extant species:

- Southern mountain cavy, M. australis
- Jayat's mountain cavy, M. jayat
- Thomas's mountain cavy, M. maenas
- Andean mountain cavy, M. niata
- Shipton's mountain cavy, M. shiptoni
- Sorojchi mountain cavy, M. sorojchi

The extant species, Microcavia Australis, Southern Mountain cavy, are semi-fossorial, which means they are animals that have adapted to living underground by digging into burrows & tunnels. M. Australis are daytime and social rodent native to South America. They inhibit arid and semiarid lowlands and valleys and can be seen in certain habitats like Dunes, Dessert and dryer lands. For example, in Southwestern Argentina, it prefers, riparian habitats, forested areas and sandy forest flats. While in Buenos Aires Province, Argentina, southern cavies inhibit areas where thornbushes are the predominant vegetation. Microcavia contributes to the ecological system of the world, through vegetation, ways of living, and adaptability.

Four fossil species are traditionally recognized, including the type species of this genus:

- Microcavia chapalmalensis
- Microcavia reigi
- Microcavia robusta
- Microcavia typus

At least nine other fossil species have also been named, dating back to the mid Pliocene, although it is unclear how many of these are truly valid.
