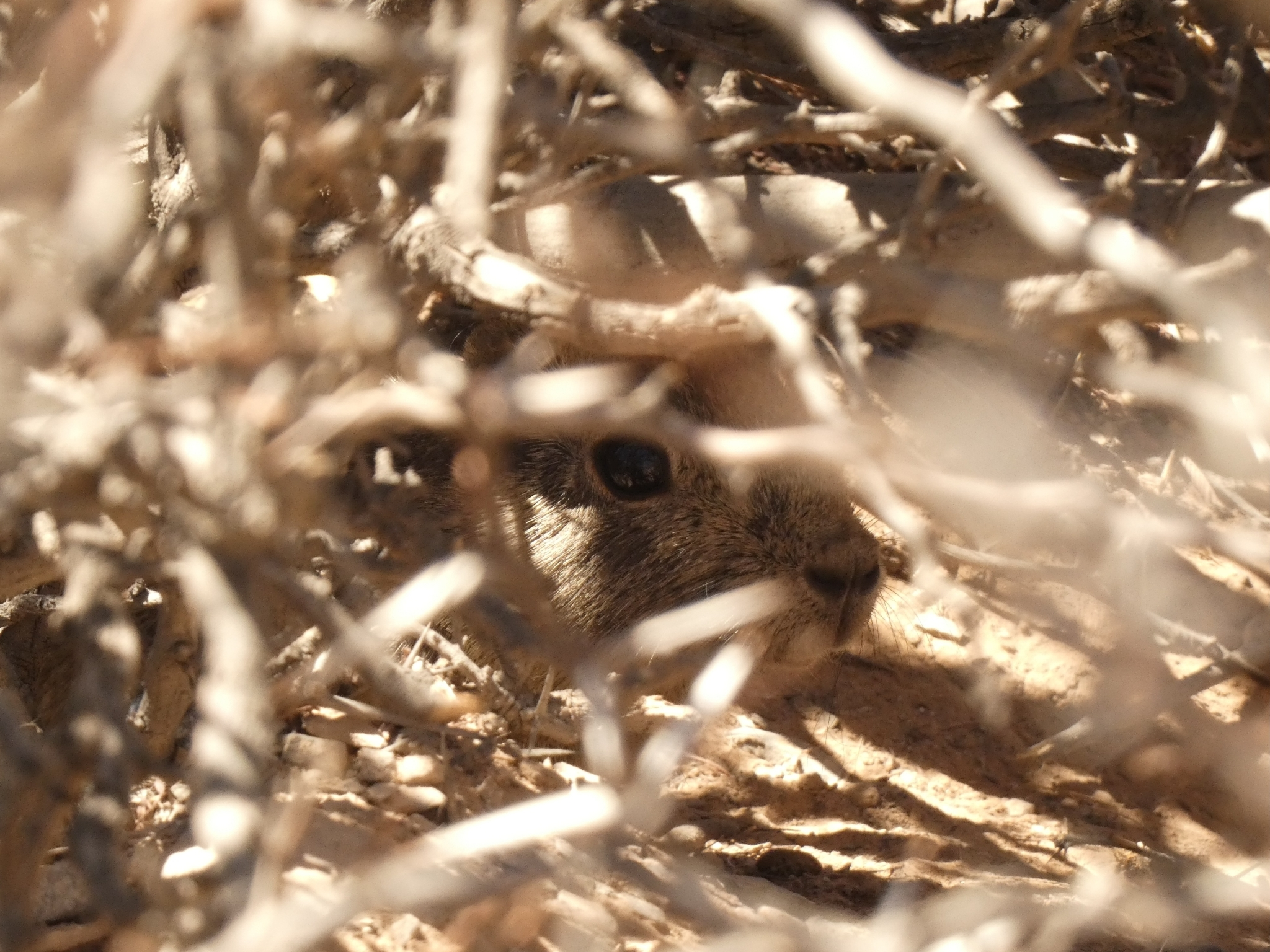

Conservation status
- Least Concern (IUCN 3.1)

Scientific classification
- Kingdom: Animalia
- Phylum: Chordata
- Class: Mammalia
- Order: Rodentia
- Family: Caviidae
- Genus: Microcavia
- Species: M. shiptoni

Binomial name
- Microcavia shiptoni (Thomas, 1925)
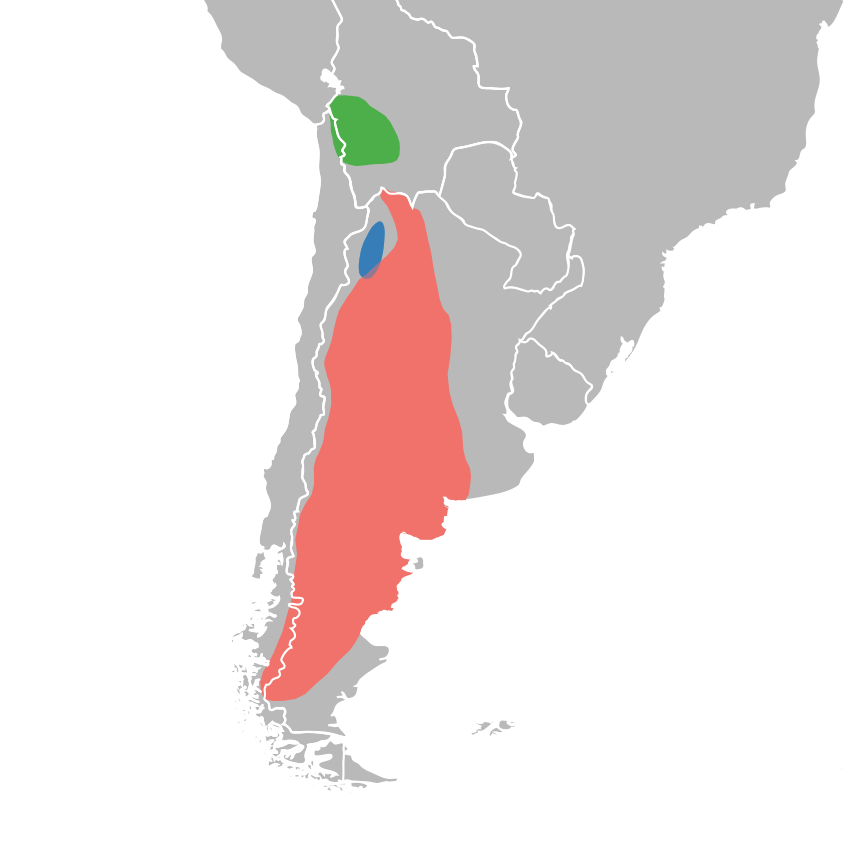
- Microcavia distribution M. shiptoni in blue

= Shipton's mountain cavy =

Species of rodent

Shipton's mountain cavy (Microcavia shiptoni) is a species of rodent in the family Caviidae. It is endemic to Argentina.
