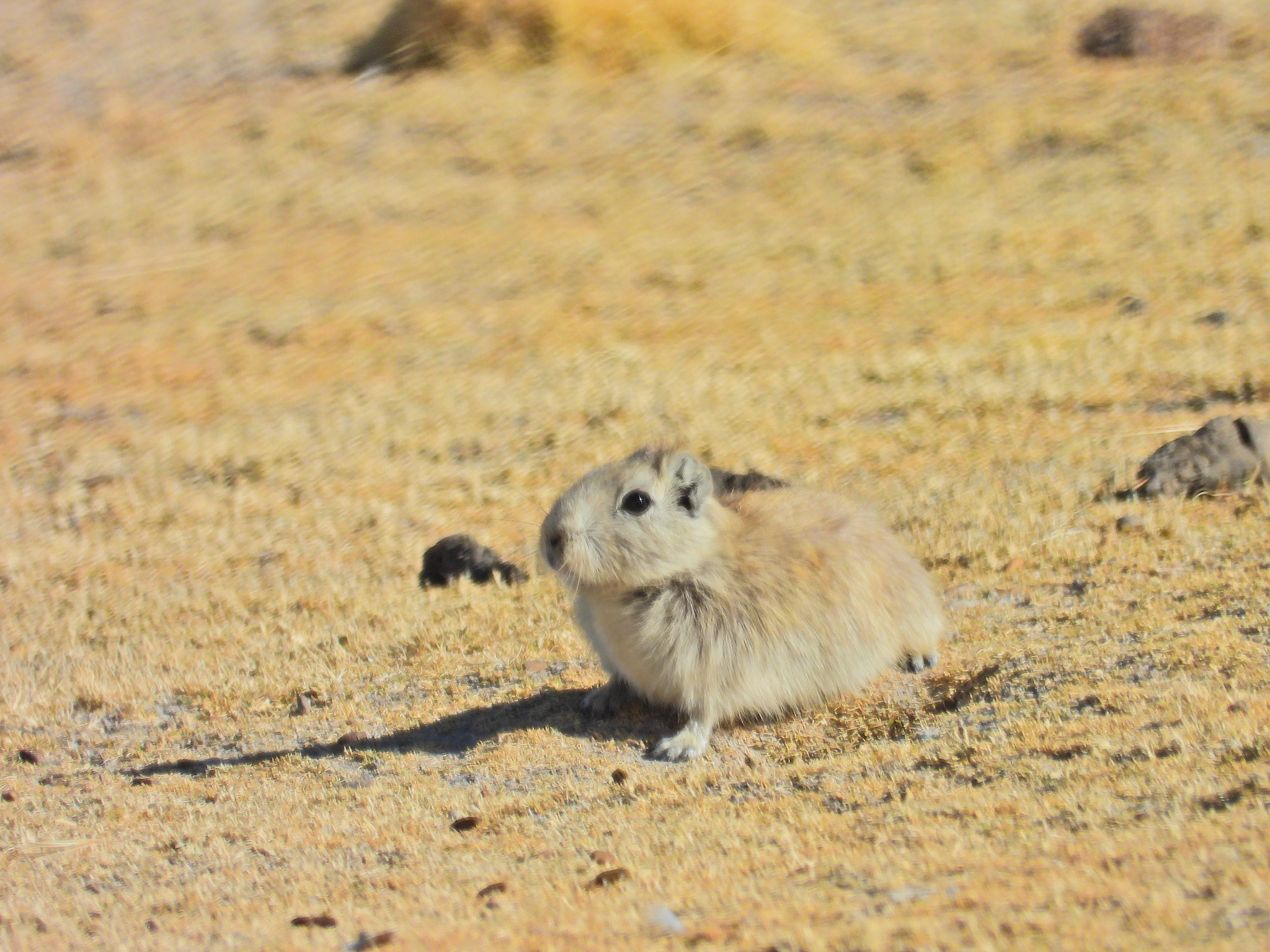

Conservation status
- Least Concern (IUCN 3.1)

Scientific classification
- Kingdom: Animalia
- Phylum: Chordata
- Class: Mammalia
- Infraclass: Placentalia
- Order: Rodentia
- Family: Caviidae
- Genus: Microcavia
- Species: M. niata

Binomial name
- Microcavia niata (Thomas, 1898)
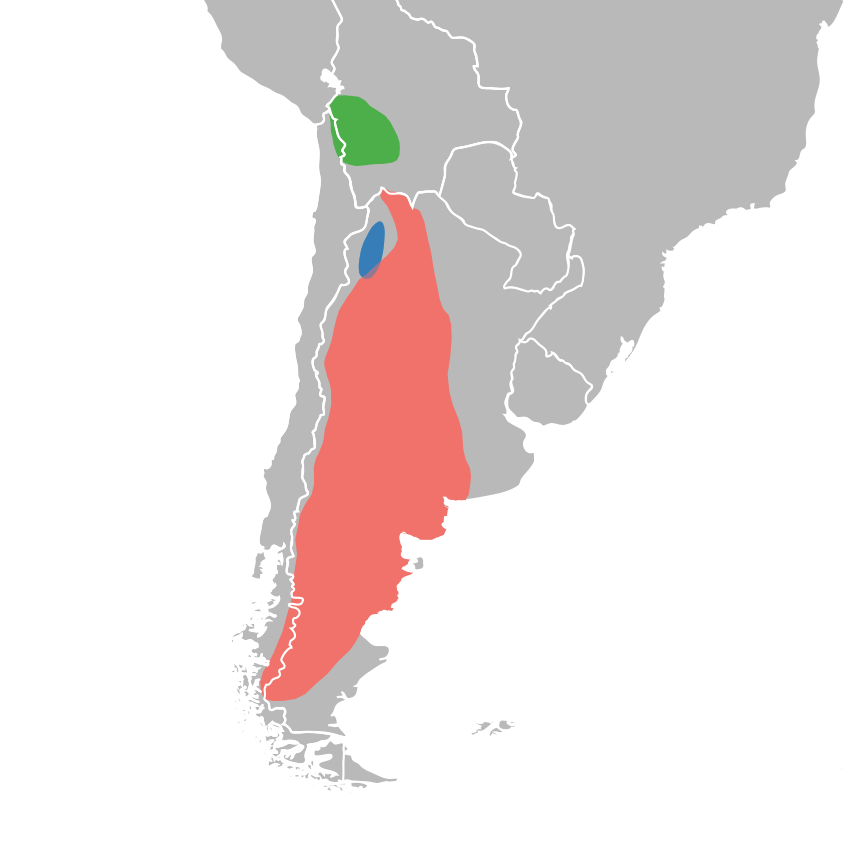
- Microcavia distribution M. niata in green

= Andean mountain cavy =

Species of rodent

The Andean mountain cavy (Microcavia niata) is a species of rodent in the family Caviidae. It is found in Bolivia, Chile and Peru.

== Feeding ==
The Andean mountain cavy's diet consists of herbs typically of the genus Eleocharis, Distichlis, Verbena, and Deyeuxia, which are common in bog areas, which suggest that this species of Microcavia only live in bog areas.

== Characteristics ==
The Andean mountain cavy is usually seen with fur described as pale and soft, with yellow undertones. The dorsal hairs are multicoloured with a grey base, a dark grey middle and yellow tip. The back hairs are measured around 16-18mm and the animals cheeks, throat and belly are white with a grey base.
