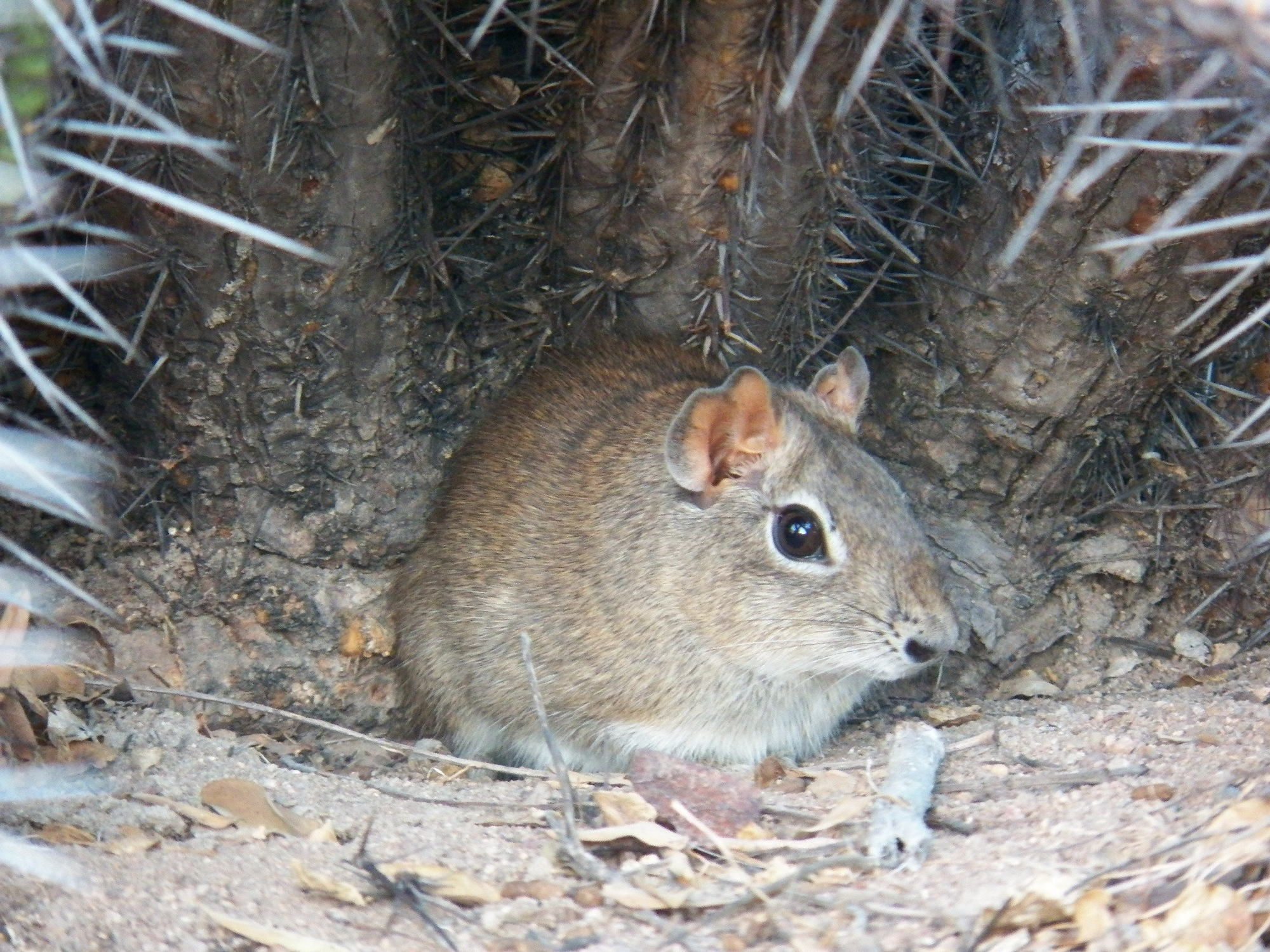

Conservation status
- Least Concern (IUCN 3.1)

Scientific classification
- Kingdom: Animalia
- Phylum: Chordata
- Class: Mammalia
- Infraclass: Placentalia
- Order: Rodentia
- Family: Caviidae
- Genus: Galea
- Species: G. spixii

Binomial name
- Galea spixii Wagler et al., 1831
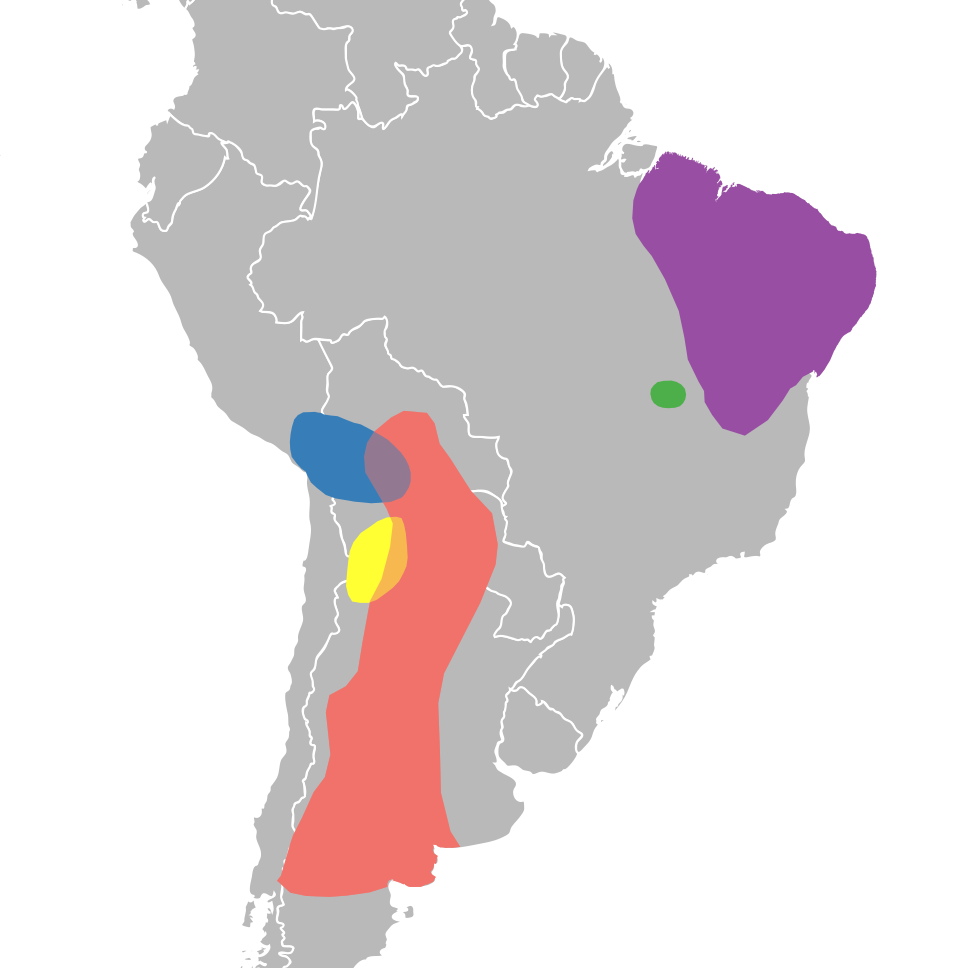
- Galea distribution G. spixii in purple

= Spix's yellow-toothed cavy =

Species of rodent

Spix's yellow-toothed cavy (Galea spixii) is a rodent, a cavy species from South America. It is found in Bolivia east of the Andes and much of south central to northeastern Brazil. The species is found in open savanna and semiarid habitats, such as the Cerrado and Caatinga of Brazil. Its karyotype is 2n = 64 and FN = 118.

Galea spixii and G. musteloides are similar and may actually be the same species. G. spixii tolerates a wide range of environmental changes, though they need open habitats. It is the most stable species within the Galea group because it is extremely abundant throughout its range.

Gestation is about fifty days. Litter size ranges from one to five, with an average of three. They have hair and open eyes at birth. Maturation of the two sexes takes differently long: female G. spixii have an open vagina when they are approximately eighty days old while the testicular descent is completed in male G. spixii at around one hundred thirty-five days old. Males and females in this species are aggressive to each other. Paternal care is rarely remarkable. When females go into estrus aggressiveness increases. On the other hand, when male approaches females in order to mate, it competes aggressively with other males. A study done in Brazil reported that nine male cavies were put to death to experiment their sperm recovery by soaking or injecting their sperm into a liquid that contained a chemical buffer. Unfortunately, there were no distinctive results between either soaking or injecting.
