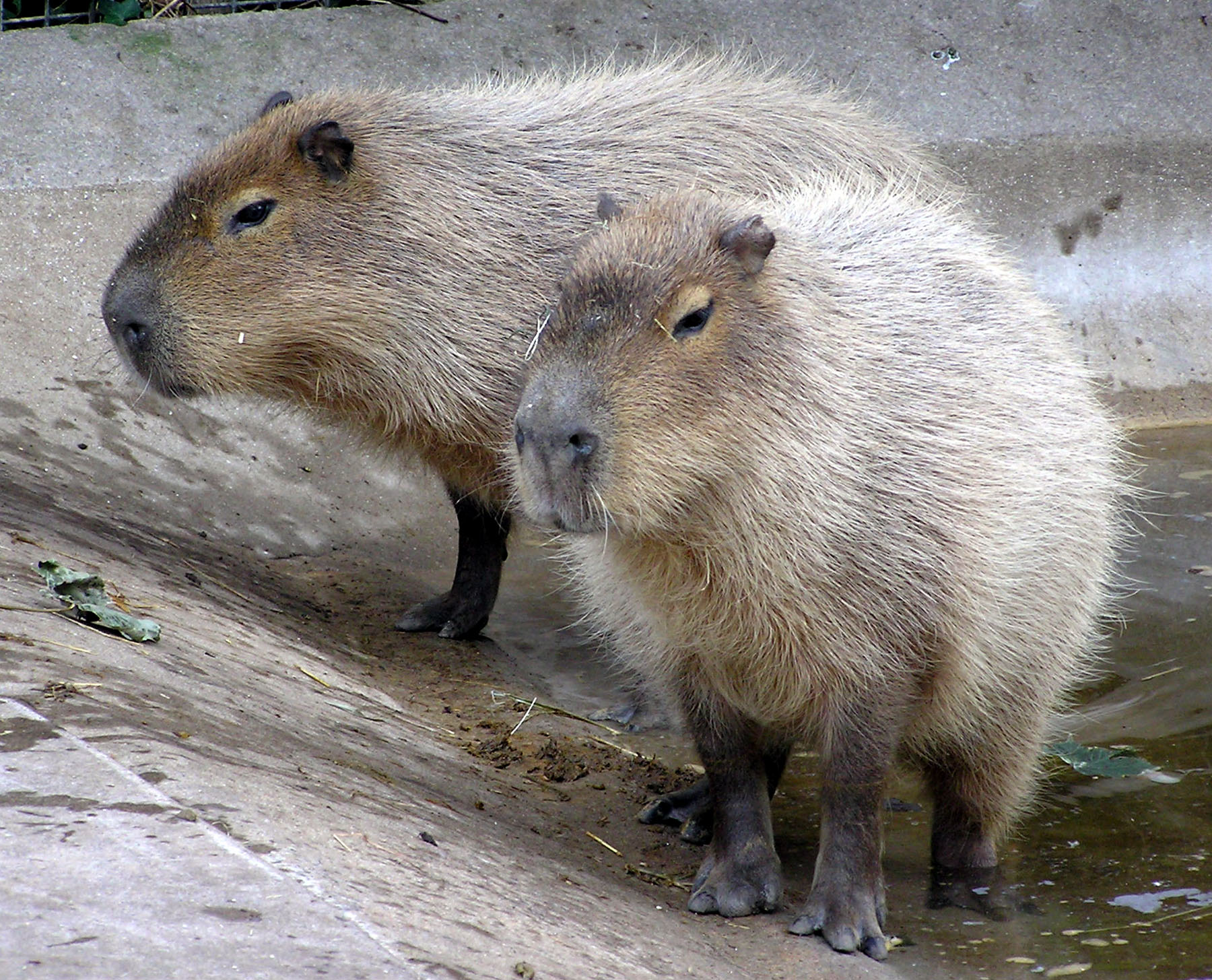
- Capybara

Scientific classification
- Kingdom: Animalia
- Phylum: Chordata
- Class: Mammalia
- Infraclass: Placentalia
- Order: Rodentia
- Family: Caviidae
- Subfamily: Hydrochoerinae; J. E. Gray, 1825

Genera
- Kerodon; †Porcellusignum; †Cardiatherium; †Phugatherium; †Xenocardia; †Contracavia; †Anatochoerus; †Hydrochoeropsis; †Nothydrochoerus; †Neochoerus; Hydrochoerus

= Hydrochoerinae =

Hydrochoerinae Temporal range: Tortonian–present

Subfamily of rodents

Hydrochoerinae (from Ancient Greek ὕδωρ (húdor), meaning "water", and χοίρος (khoíros), meaning "pig") is a subfamily of Caviidae, consisting of two living genera, Hydrochoerus, the capybaras, and Kerodon, the rock cavies. In addition, a number of extinct genera related to capybaras should also be placed in this subfamily. The taxonomy of Hydrochoerinae is confused because, until 2005, living capybaras and their extinct relatives were placed in their own family, Hydrochoeridae. Recent molecular phylogenetic studies recognize a close relationship between Hydrochoerus and Kerodon, supporting placement of both genera in a subfamily of Caviidae. The taxonomy of fossil hydrochoerines is in a state of flux. In recent years, the diversity of fossil hydrochoerines has been substantially reduced. This is largely due to the recognition that capybara molar teeth show strong variation in shape over the life of an individual. In one instance, material once referred to four genera and seven species on the basis of differences in molar shape is now thought to represent differently aged individuals of a single species, Cardiatherium paranense.
