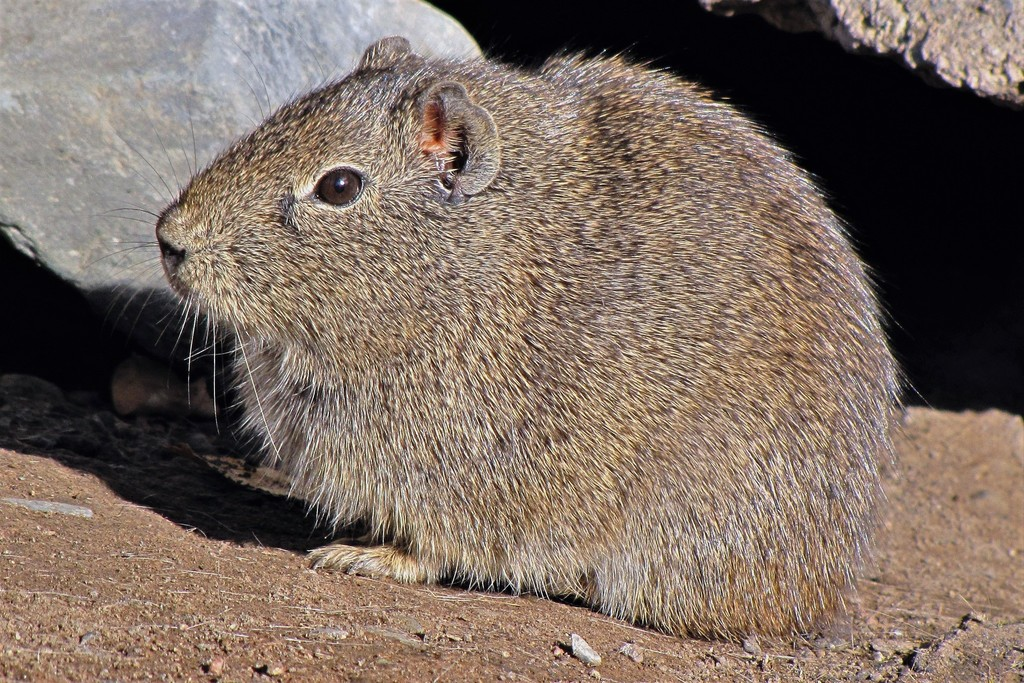

Conservation status
- Data Deficient (IUCN 3.1)

Scientific classification
- Kingdom: Animalia
- Phylum: Chordata
- Class: Mammalia
- Order: Rodentia
- Family: Caviidae
- Genus: Galea
- Species: G. musteloides

Binomial name
- Galea musteloides Meyen, 1832
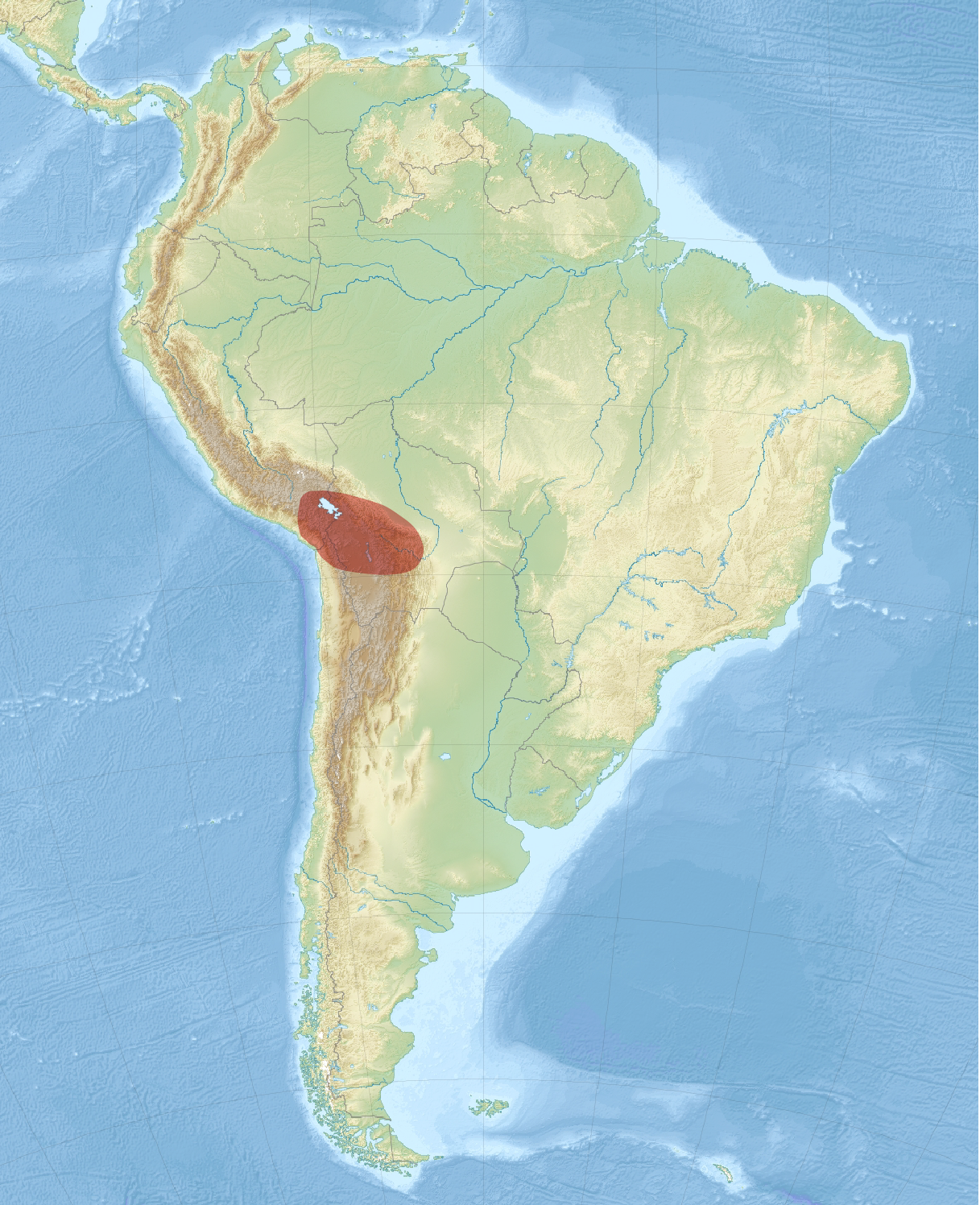
- Common Yellow-Toothed Cavy Range Map

= Common yellow-toothed cavy =

Species of rodent

The common yellow-toothed cavy (Galea musteloides) is a species of rodent in the family Caviidae, closely related to the domesticated guinea pig. It is found in Argentina, Bolivia, Chile, and Peru. Its karyotype has 2n = 68 and FN = 136. G. musteloides is the most common and widely found member of Galea, and is present at elevations ranging from 20 to 5000 m above sea level. It has yellow teeth.

A recent study reveals there are five subspecies of G. musteloides: boliviensis, demissa, leucoblephara, littoralis and musteloides. These are recognized on the basis of pelage coloration, size and shape of skull, auditory bullae size and tooth shape. The species is found within a range from southern Peru to central Argentina. Evidence is mounting that the lowland form of G. musteloides is an independent species and should be called G. leucoblephara. It is a "diurnal herbivore of squirrel size that lives in groups and occupies open habitat."

Female and male common yellow-toothed cavies average 37.6 g and 36.4 g at birth, respectively. G. musteloides reproduces for the first time at one to three months of age; the minimum age needed to reproduce is twenty-eight days. Gestation lasts fifty-three days and lactation for three weeks. Litter size averages 2.7.

In Peru, Galea sometimes associates with tuco-tucos (Ctenomys). According to Sanborn and Pearson, Galea use tuco-tuco burrows and respond to tuco-tuco alarm calls. G. musteloides is mostly found in moist areas such as stream edges and croplands.

In captive groups G. musteloides establish a male and a female hierarchical order. The alpha males regularly guard receptive females, but to little effect. Usually other males also mate with the same female and in more than 80% of cases the resulting littermates have more than one father. At least in captivity the females are clearly promiscuous, always mating with several males in the group. In the wild G. musteloides is clearly territorial, and it remains unclear if a similar hierarchical social order exists, or if they live solitarily. Aggression between adult males happens regularly. Adult male G. musteloides never engage in parental activities and are aggressive to subadult males even if they are their own offspring and very young. However, males are not aggressive to females. Adult females lactate and nurse the offspring of other females during their first week of life. Nearly all offspring receive some milk from females other than their mother. However, a female's own offspring are cared for preferentially and for longer than one week.

As closely related Galea species show a range of mating systems from monogamy to promiscuity, comparative studies are possible in these groups. General trends have been identified: a) testis size increases relative to body size in promiscuous species and b) higher social tolerance in captive held groups is associated with greater promiscuity and higher testosterone levels in males. Testosterone levels and aggression levels in males are not correlated. In fact females avoid above average aggressive males.
