= Franz Meyen =

Prussian physician and botanist

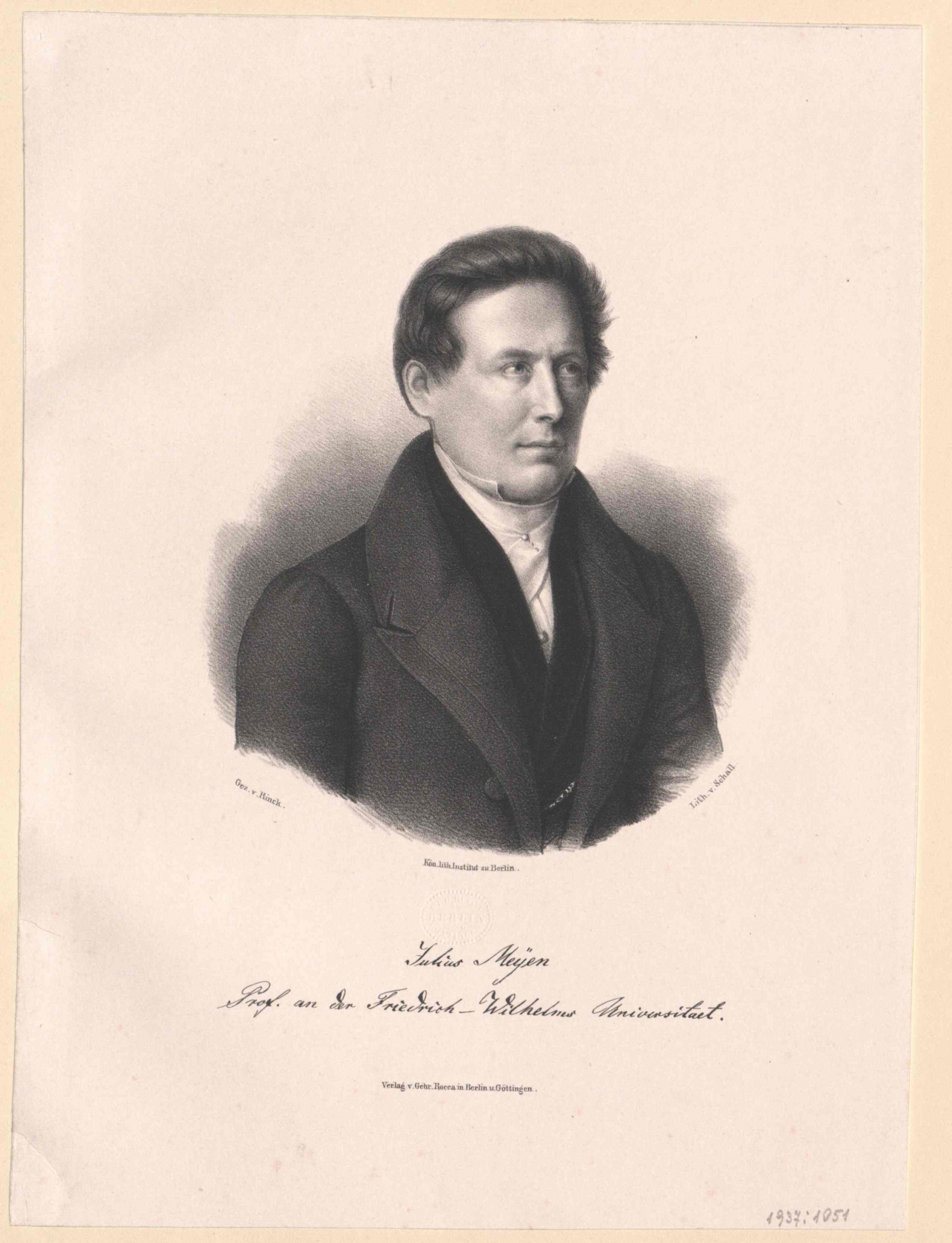
- Meyen in 1840
- Born: 28 June 1804; Tilsit, East Prussia
- Died: 2 September 1840 (aged 36); Berlin
- Education: University of Berlin
- Known for: Phytotomie, the first major study of plant anatomy
- Scientific career
- Fields: Medicine, botany
- Institutions: Charité, Berlin; University of Berlin
- Author abbrev. (botany): Meyen

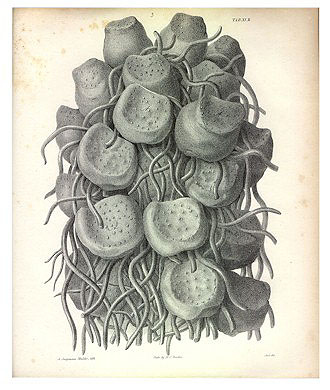
Plate to Ueber die neuesten Fortschritte der Anatomie und Physiologie der Gewächse (1834).

Franz Julius Ferdinand Meyen (28 June 1804 – 2 September 1840) was a Prussian medical doctor and botanist.

Meyen was born in Tilsit, East Prussia (now Sovetsk, Kaliningrad Oblast, Russia). In 1830 he wrote Phytotomie, the first major study of plant anatomy. Between 1830 and 1832, he took part in an expedition to South America on board the Prinzess Luise, visiting Peru and Bolivia, describing species then new to science such as the Humboldt penguin.

From 1823 to 1826, he studied medicine at the University of Berlin, followed by service as a military surgeon at the Charité in Berlin. In 1834 he became an associate professor of botany in Berlin. With Heinrich Friedrich Link, he was co-editor of the journal Jahresberichte über die Arbeiten für physiologische Botanik (1837–1839).

He died in Berlin in 1840.

== Honoria ==
- The plant genus Meyenia commemorates his name.
- The stingray Taeniurops meyeni (J. P. Müller & Henle, 1841) was named after him.

== See also ==
- Category:Taxa named by Franz Meyen

== Selected works ==
- 1828, Anatomisch-physiologische Untersuchungen über den Inhalt der Pflanzenzellen, Berlin: Hirschwald.
- 1830, Phytotomie.
- 1837, Ueber die Secretions-Organe der Pflanzen. Berlin: Morin [part of: Müller Library].
- 1837, Neues System der Pflanzen-Physiologie. Erster Band. Berlin: Haude & Spener.
- 1838, Jahresbericht über die Resultate der Arbeiten im Felde der physiologischen Botanik von dem Jahre 1837, Berlin: Nicolai'sche Buchhandlung
- 1839, Jahresbericht über die Resultate der Arbeiten im Felde der physiologischen Botanik von dem Jahre 1838, Berlin: Nicolai'sche Buchhandlung.
