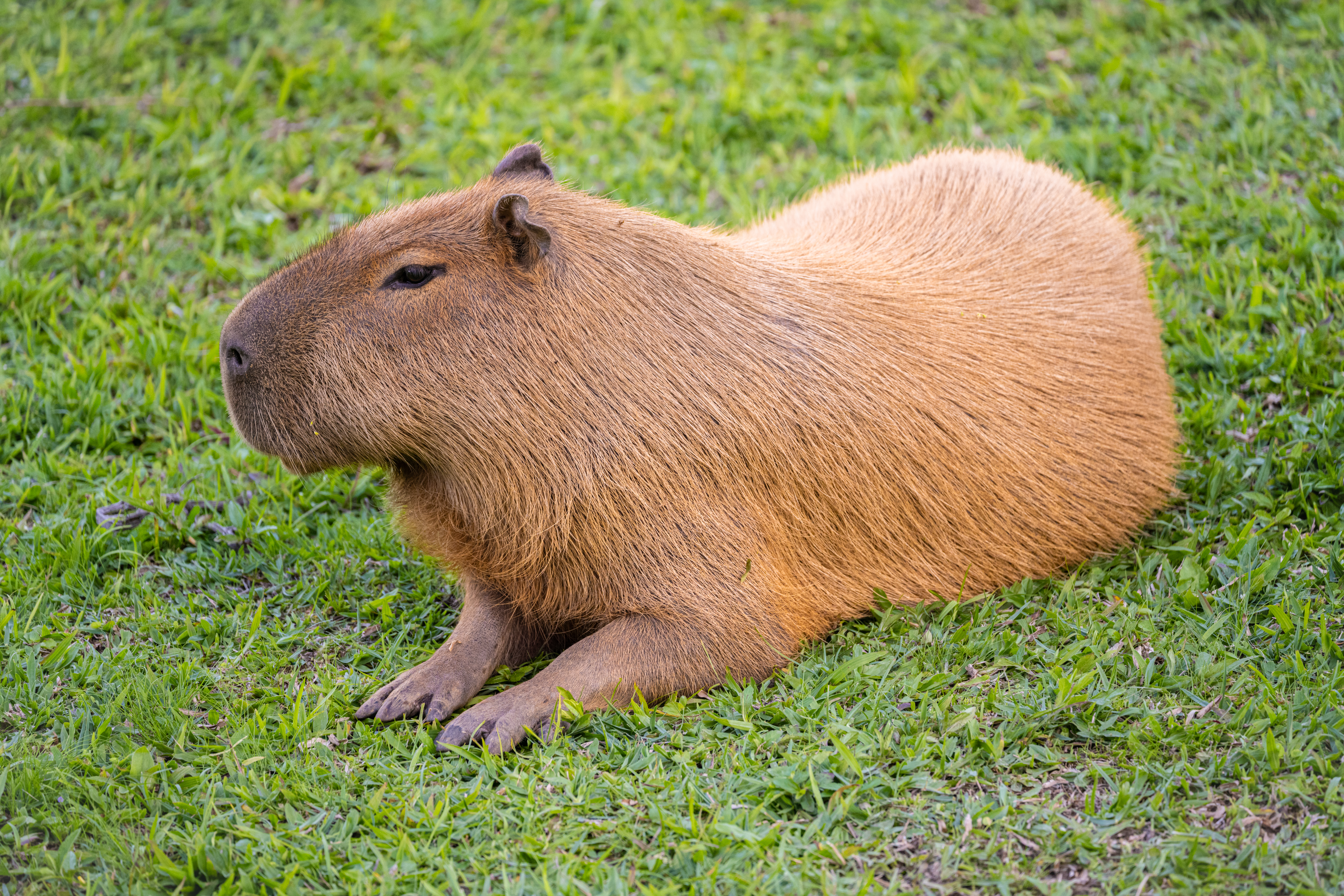
- Capybara

Scientific classification
- Kingdom: Animalia
- Phylum: Chordata
- Class: Mammalia
- Order: Rodentia
- Superfamily: Cavioidea
- Family: Caviidae; Fischer von Waldheim, 1818

Subfamilies
- Caviinae; Dolichotinae; Hydrochoerinae
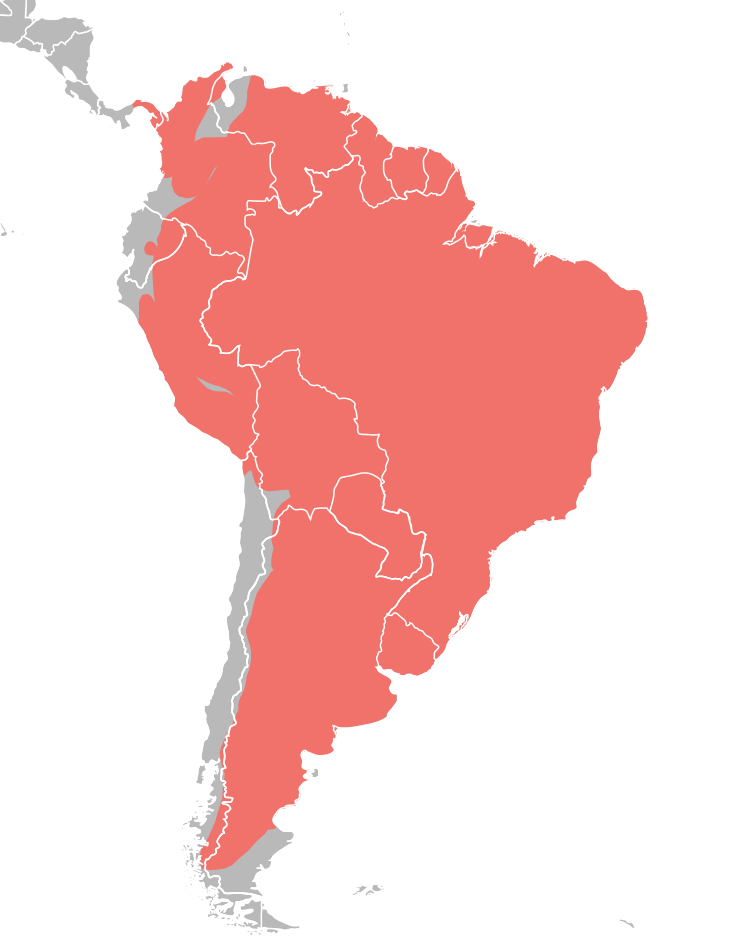
- Caviidae distribution

= Caviidae =

Caviidae Temporal range: Middle Miocene–Holocene

Family of rodents that includes the domestic guinea pig

Caviidae, the cavy family, is composed of rodents native to South America and includes the domestic guinea pig, wild cavies, and the largest living rodent, the capybara. They are found across South America in open areas from moist savanna to thorn forests or scrub desert. This family of rodents has fewer members than most other rodent families, with 19 species in seven genera in three subfamilies.

== Characteristics ==
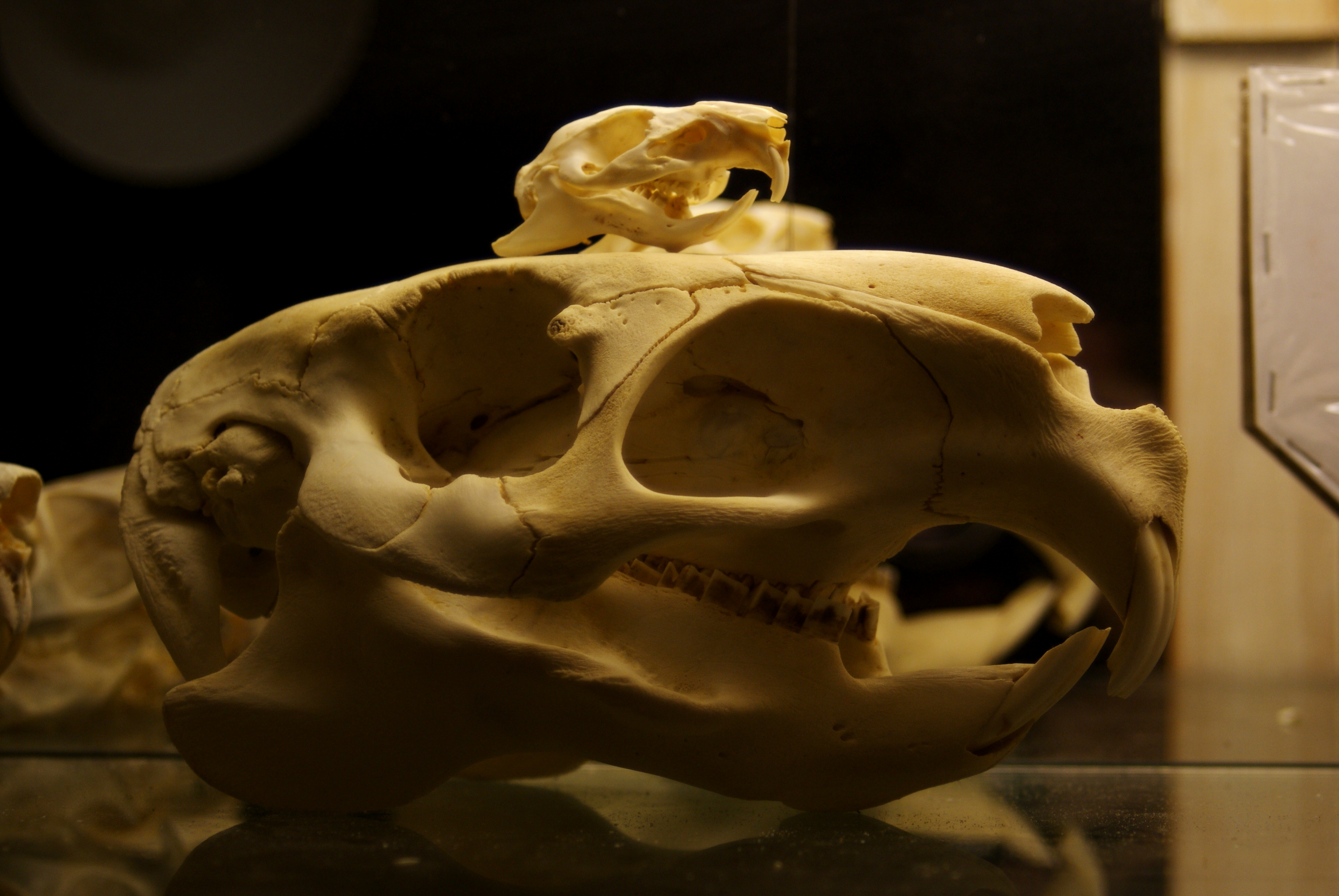
Guinea pig skull on top of a capybara skull

With the exception of the maras, which have a more rabbit-like appearance, caviids have short, heavy bodies and large heads. Most have no visible tails. They range in size from the smaller cavies at 22 cm in body length, and 300 grams in weight, up to the capybara, the largest of all rodents at 106 to 134 cm in length, and body weights of 35 to 66 kilograms. Even larger forms existed in the Pliocene, such as Phugatherium, which was about the size of a tapir.

They are herbivores, eating tough grasses or softer leaves, depending on species. The dental formula is similar to that of various other rodents: 1.0.1.31.0.1.3. Females give birth to two or three furred and active young after a gestation period of 50 to 90 days in most species, or 150 days in the capybara. In most species, they are sexually mature within a few months of birth, although in capybaras, maturity is not reached until around 18 months.

Social organisation varies widely among the group. Many cavies are promiscuous, forming no long-lasting social groups, although, in some species, males maintain harems of two or more females. In contrast, maras are monogamous, and form temporary colonial crèches to care for the young of multiple mothers. Capybaras live in groups of around 10 individuals, and sometimes many more, each with a single dominant male, and a number of females, subordinate males, and juveniles.

== Classification ==
The family Caviidae is a sister group to the family Dasyproctidae, both of which are members of the superfamily Cavioidea. Fossils caviids first appeared during the middle of the Miocene epoch in South America.

Family Caviidae

- Subfamily Caviinae
  - Genus Cavia (at least six species): guinea pigs or cavies, includes the domestic guinea pig
  - Genus Galea (four extant species): yellow-toothed cavies
  - Genus Microcavia (three extant species): mountain cavies
- Subfamily Dolichotinae: maras
  - Genus Dolichotis (two extant species): maras
- Subfamily Hydrochoerinae
  - Genus Hydrochoerus (two extant species): capybaras
  - Genus Kerodon (two species): rock cavies
