= Ankara (disambiguation) =

Ankara is the capital of Turkey.

Ankara may also refer to:

== Places and establishments ==
- Ankara Province in Turkey
  - Ankara University
  - Battle of Ankara
  - Ankara Central railway station
  - Ankara Vilayet
  - Ankara Eyalet
  - Ankara Demirspor
  - Treaty of Ankara (disambiguation)
  - Ankara Castle
  - Ankara River

== Other ==
- African wax prints, also known as "Ankara"
- 1457 Ankara, an asteroid
- Ankara (whisky), a liquor produced in Turkey

== See also ==
- Angara (disambiguation)
- Angora (disambiguation)
