= Hittite sun disk =

Ancient Anatolian symbol

A depiction of the disk

The Hittite Sun Disk or Hittite Sun Course is an ancient Anatolian symbol dating back to the 20th century BC.

The disks can be divided into four distinct variations. These are Semi-circular, Diamond shaped, Circular with bulls' horn and circular of semicircular with a complex design including animals and horns. The last one of those types was replicated in the Hittite Sun Course Monument. The sun disks have been found in at least 13 royal tombs from the early Bronze Age in Alaca Höyük.

== Description ==
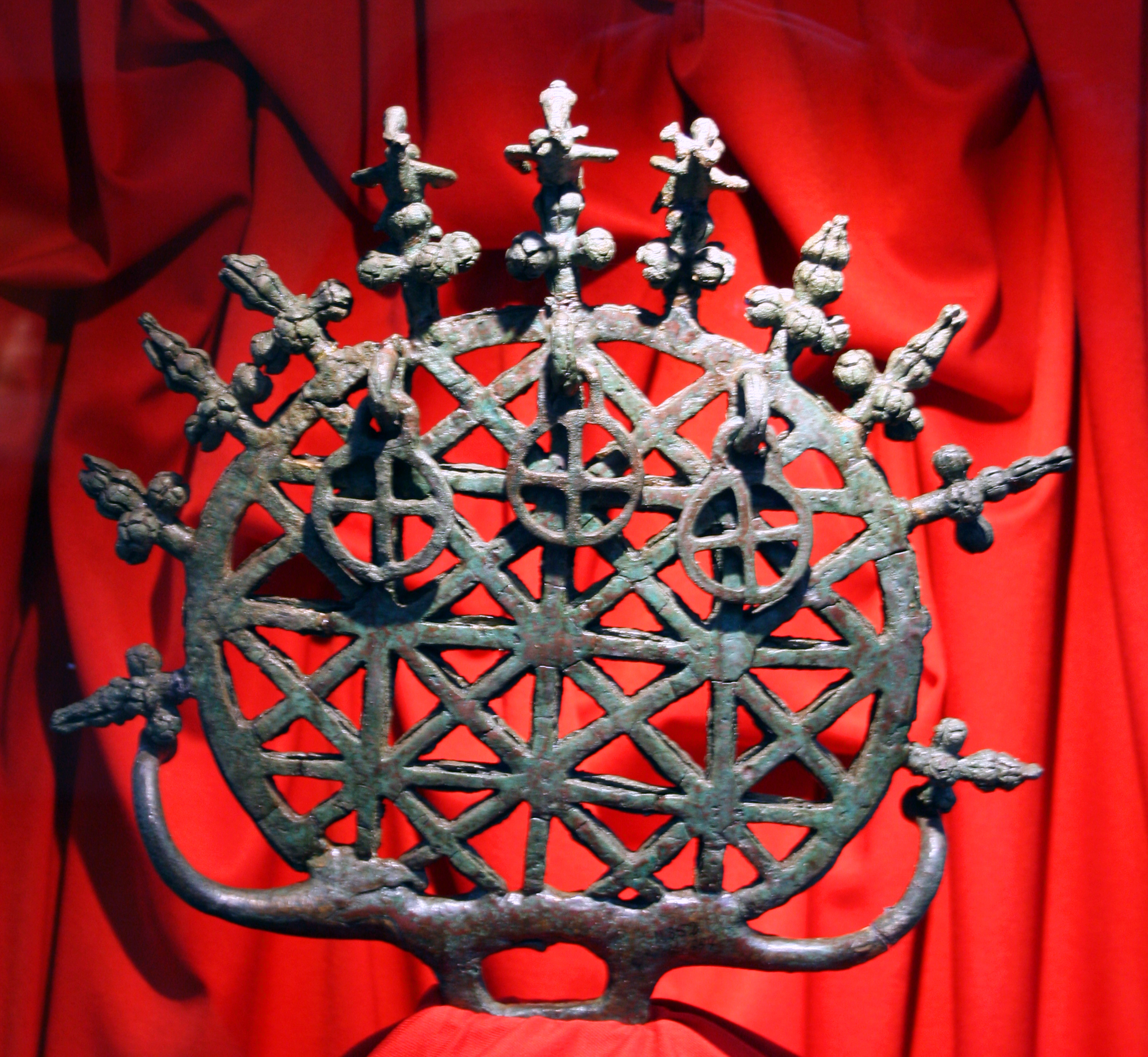
A sun disk found in tombs in Alacahöyük dates back to the early Bronze Age.

Ankara University writes that:

The symbol belongs to the Hattis from the pre-Hittite period. The Sun Disc is made of bronze, and was commonly used about 4250 years ago in religious ceremonies. The circle which forms the perimeter of the disc represents either the earth or the sun. At the bottom, there are two horn-like protrusions but what they represent is not clear. The protrusions at the top represent fertility, and the procreation of nature. The birds symbolize fertility and the freedom in nature. The sun disc is known to have been made about 300 years prior to the Hittite settlement in Anatolia. Hatti kings were buried in funeral ceremonies typically with 4-5 such symbols of similar design.

== Modern usage ==
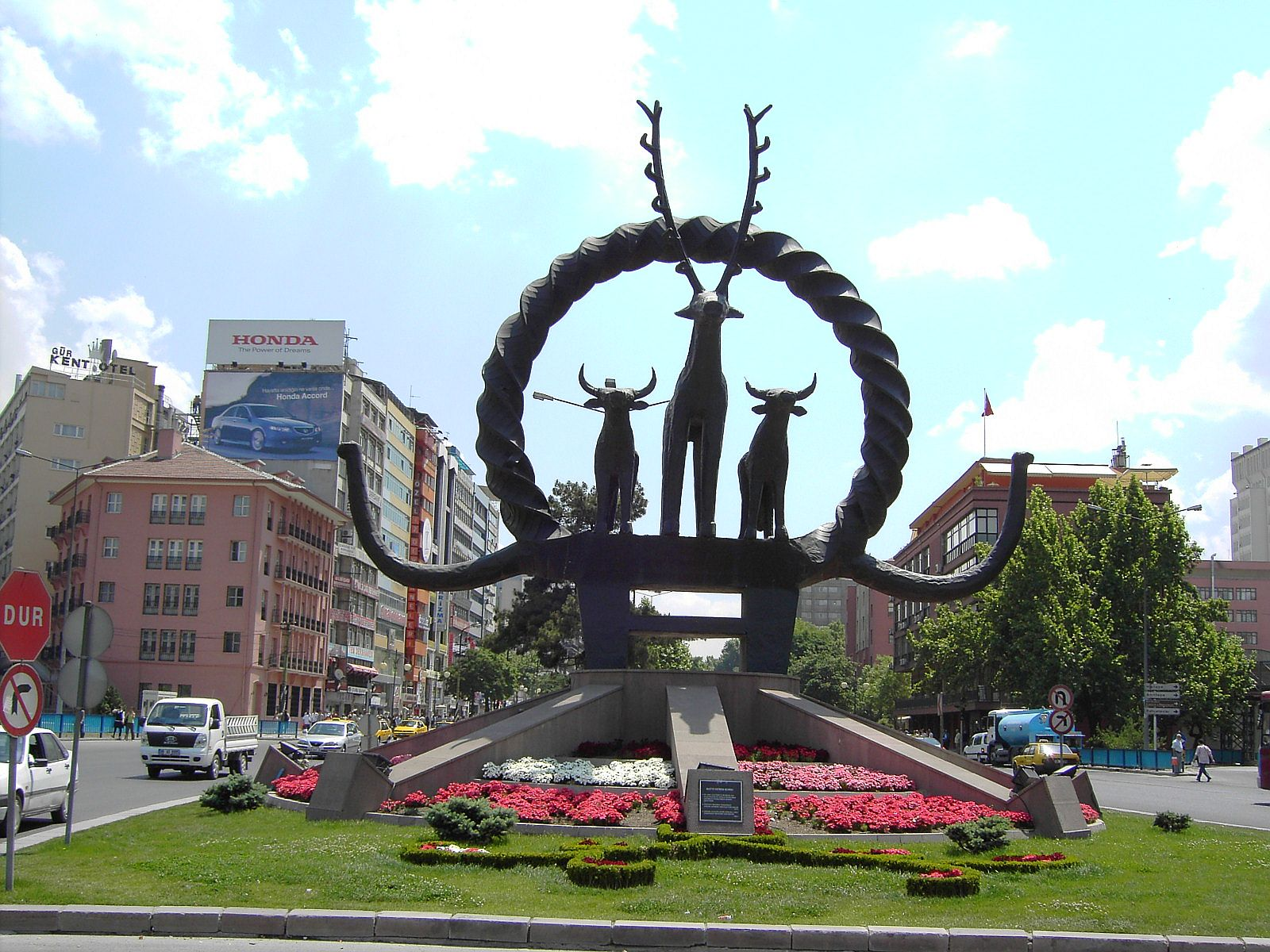
Hittite Sun Disc Monument in Ankara, Turkey

The sun disk is used as the symbol of Ankara University. In 1974, it became the symbol of the Turkish capital, Ankara until it was replaced with an Islamic symbol in 1995.

A monument, Hittite Sun Course Monument, to the Hittites was created by the sculptor Nusret Suman and was erected in Sıhhiye Square in 1978.

The Turkish food producing company Eti uses the sun disk as their logo.

== See also ==
- Alaca Höyük bronze standards
- Hittite Art
- Sun Cross

== Sources ==
- http://www.jstor.org/stable/10.2979/histmemo.29.2.02?seq=1#page_scan_tab_contents
