= Elikkala =

- village
- Location in Karnataka, India Elikkala (India)
- Coordinates: 12°31′23″N 75°23′10″E
- Country: India
- State: Karnataka
- District: Dakshina Kannada
- Founder: Venkataramana E S
- Talukas: Sullia

Languages
  - Official: Kannada
- Time zone: UTC+5:30 (IST)
- Postal code: 574239

Elikkala is a place in Aletty in the southern state of Karnataka, India. It is located in the Aletty post and village Sullia taluk of Dakshina Kannada district in Karnataka.

== Demographics ==
As of 2001 India census, Aletty had a population of coming soon with males and females.

== Temples ==
- Shree Sadashiva Temple Aletty, Historical temple

== Schools ==
- Govt High School Aletty Sullia
- Higher Primary School Aletty Sullia

== Nearby places ==
- Aletty
- Mangalore
- Puttur
- Sullia
- Thodikana

== How to reach ==
Elikkala is 6 km from Sullia (Sullia Aletty, Baddaka, Panathuru, Kerala Road)

- Private bus available from Sullia via Aletty
- Private jeep facility available from Sullia

Nearest railway station: Puttur

Nearest airport: Mangalore

== See also ==
- Dakshina Kannada
- Districts of Karnataka
