= Angara (disambiguation) =

The Angara is a major river in south-east Siberia, Russia, connecting Lake Baikal to the Yenisey river and thence the Arctic Ocean.

Angara may also refer to:

== Places ==
=== India ===
- Angara, Andhra Pradesh, a village
- Angara block, an administrative unit in Jharkhand
- Angara, Jharkhand, a village in Ranchi district

=== Siberia, Russia ===
The following places are all near the Angara River:

- Angara craton, also known as Siberia, a paleogeographic continent
- Angara Range, a mountain range in Siberia traversed by the Angara River

=== Ukraine ===
- Perevalne or Angara, a village in Simferopol Raion, Crimea

== Arts and entertainment ==
- Angara (film), Pakistani action film
- Angara, a fictional continent in Golden Sun
- The angara, a fictional alien species in Mass Effect: Andromeda
- Angara (Tulsi Comics), a fictional character from Tulsi Comics

== Other uses ==
- Angara (icebreaker), a museum ship in Irkutsk, Russia
- Angara (rocket family), a Russian space-launch vehicle
- Angara Airlines, a Russian airline serving Siberia
- Angara (surname), including a list of people with the name
- Angara S., an Indian politician
- Angara language, a language of South America

== See also ==
- Angora (disambiguation)
- Angaria (disambiguation)
- Angarsky (disambiguation)
- Ankara (disambiguation)
- Angaar (disambiguation)
- Angar (disambiguation)
