= Doddathota =

- Place
- Location in Karnataka, India Doddathota (India)
- Coordinates: 12°35′49″N 75°26′38″E
- Country: India
- State: Karnataka
- Region: Tulu Nadu
- District: Dakshina Kannada

Government
  - MLA: S. Angara

Languages
  - Official: Kannada
- Time zone: UTC+5:30 (IST)
- PIN: 574248
- Area code: 91-8257
- Vehicle registration: KA-21
- Nearest city: Mangalore

Doddathota is a small place near Sullia in the Indian state of Karnataka. It belongs to the village named Amaramudnooru.
