= Angarey (disambiguation) =

Angarey (transl. Embers) is a collection of nine short stories and a one act play in Urdu by several authors published in 1932.

Angarey may also refer to:

- Angarey (1954 film), a 1954 Indian drama film directed by K. B. Lall, starring Nargis and Nasir Khan
- Angarey (1972 film), a 1972 Pakistani film directed by Fareed Ahmed

== See also ==
- Angaaray (disambiguation)
- Angaar (disambiguation)
- Angar (disambiguation)
- Angaarey, 1975 Indian film
