= Mithatpaşa =

Mithatpaşa is a Turkish name, and may refer to

- Mithat Pasha, Ottoman Pasha
- Mithatpaşa Avenue, Ankara
- Mithatpasa railway station, Sakarya Province
- Mithatpaşa Stadium, former name of BJK İnönü Stadium, İstanbul
