= Angara (surname) =

Angara is a surname. Notable people with the surname include:

- Arthur Angara (born 1937), Filipino politician and mayor
- Bella Angara (born 1939), Filipino politician and mayor
- Dita Angara-Mathay, Filipino diplomat
- Edgardo Angara (1934–2018), Filipino politician
- Joseph Angara (born 1971), Kenyan cricketer and coach
- Geetha Angara (1961–2005), Indian-American unsolved homicide victim
- Karen G. Angara (born 1973), Filipino politician and mayor
- Michael Angara, Papua New Guinean rugby player
- Rommel N. Angara (born 1980), Filipino poet
- Rommel T. Angara (born 1978), Filipino politician
- Sonny Angara (born 1972), Filipino politician and senator
- Suilla Angara, Indian politician

== See also ==
- Angara (disambiguation)
