= Alaca Höyük bronze standards =

Bronze grave goods found in Turkey

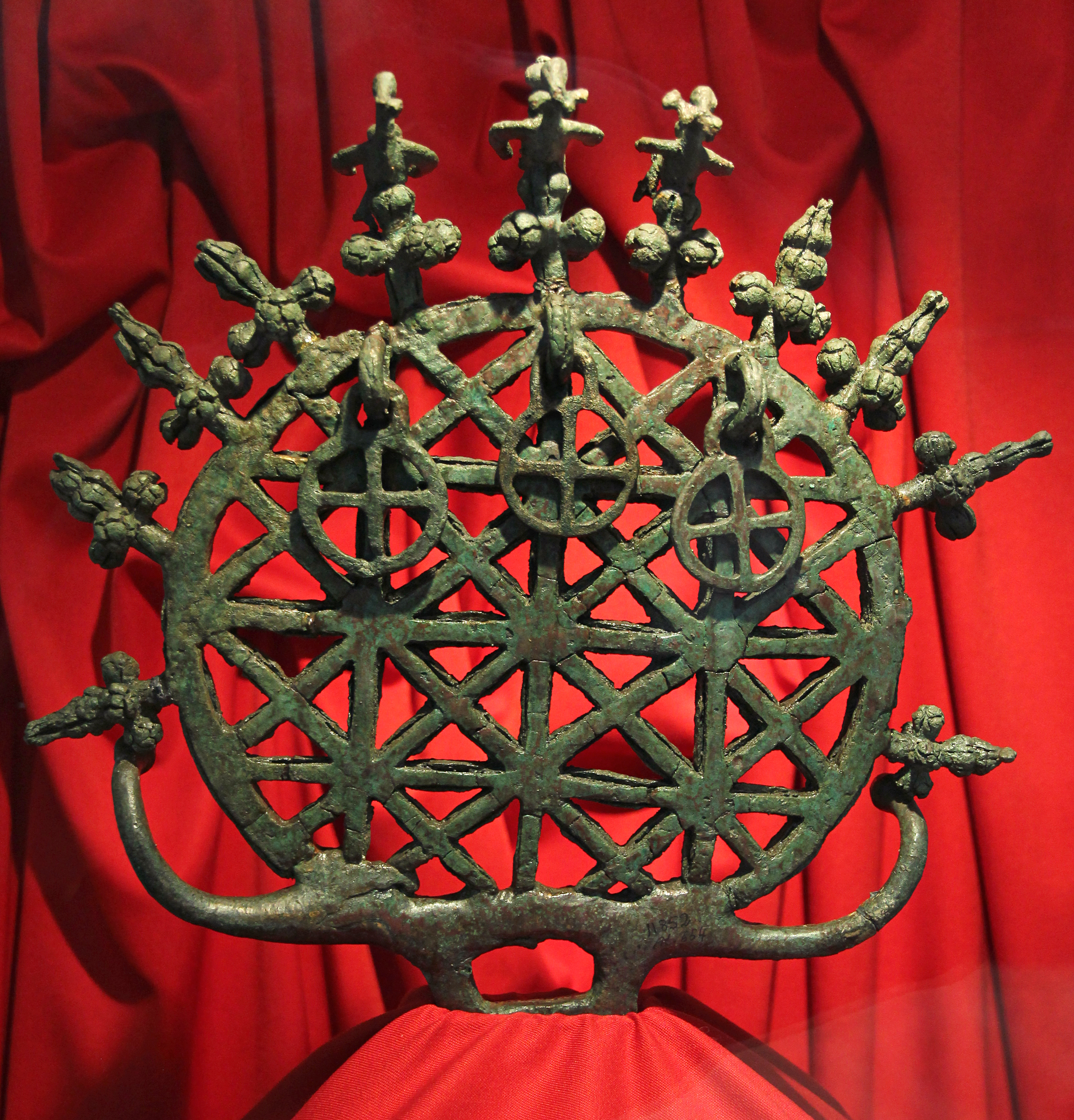
- Disc-shaped standard
- Location: Alaca Höyük, Çorum Province, Turkey

Site notes
- Excavation dates: Hamit Zübeyir Koşay, Remzi Oğuz Arık

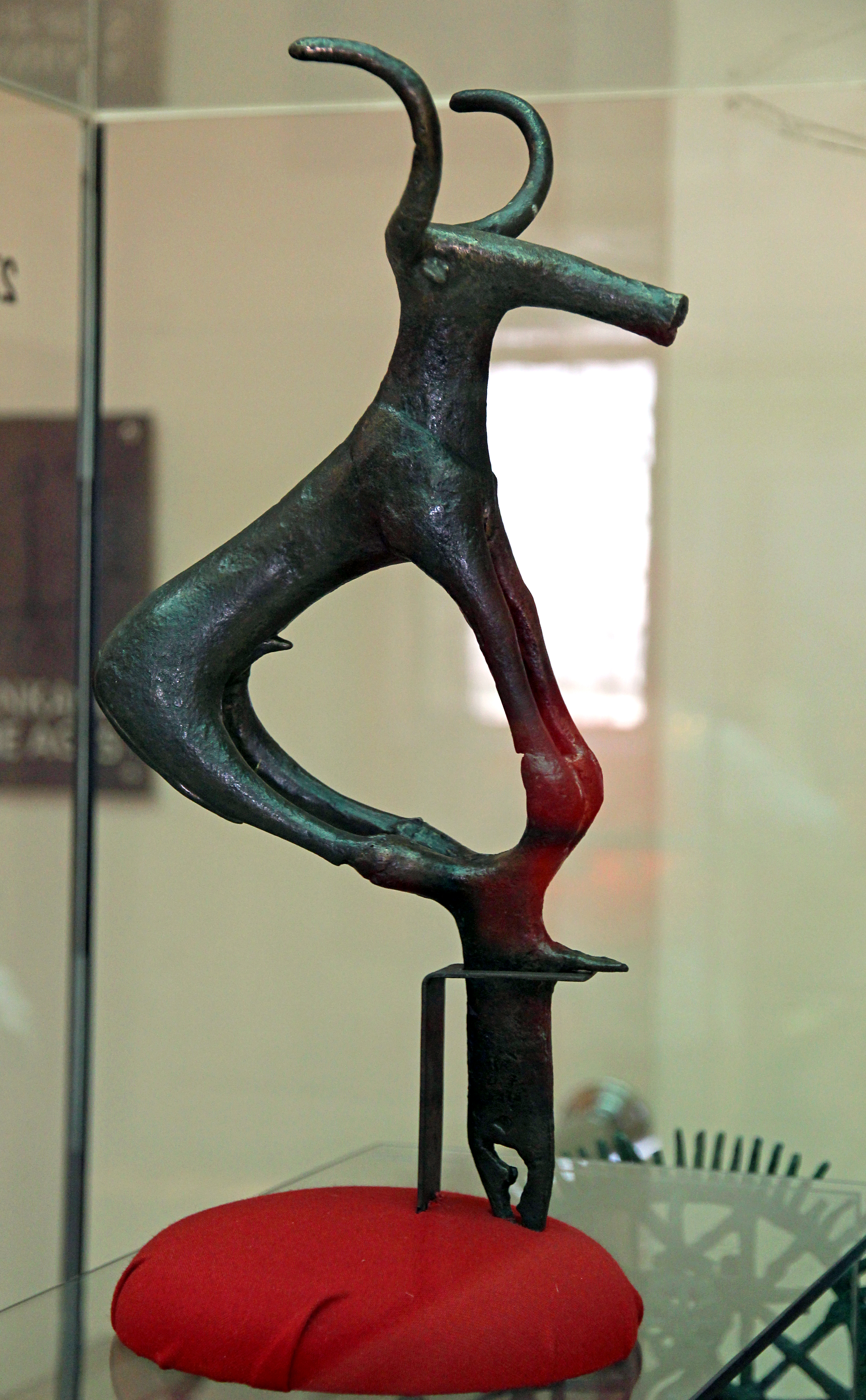
Bull

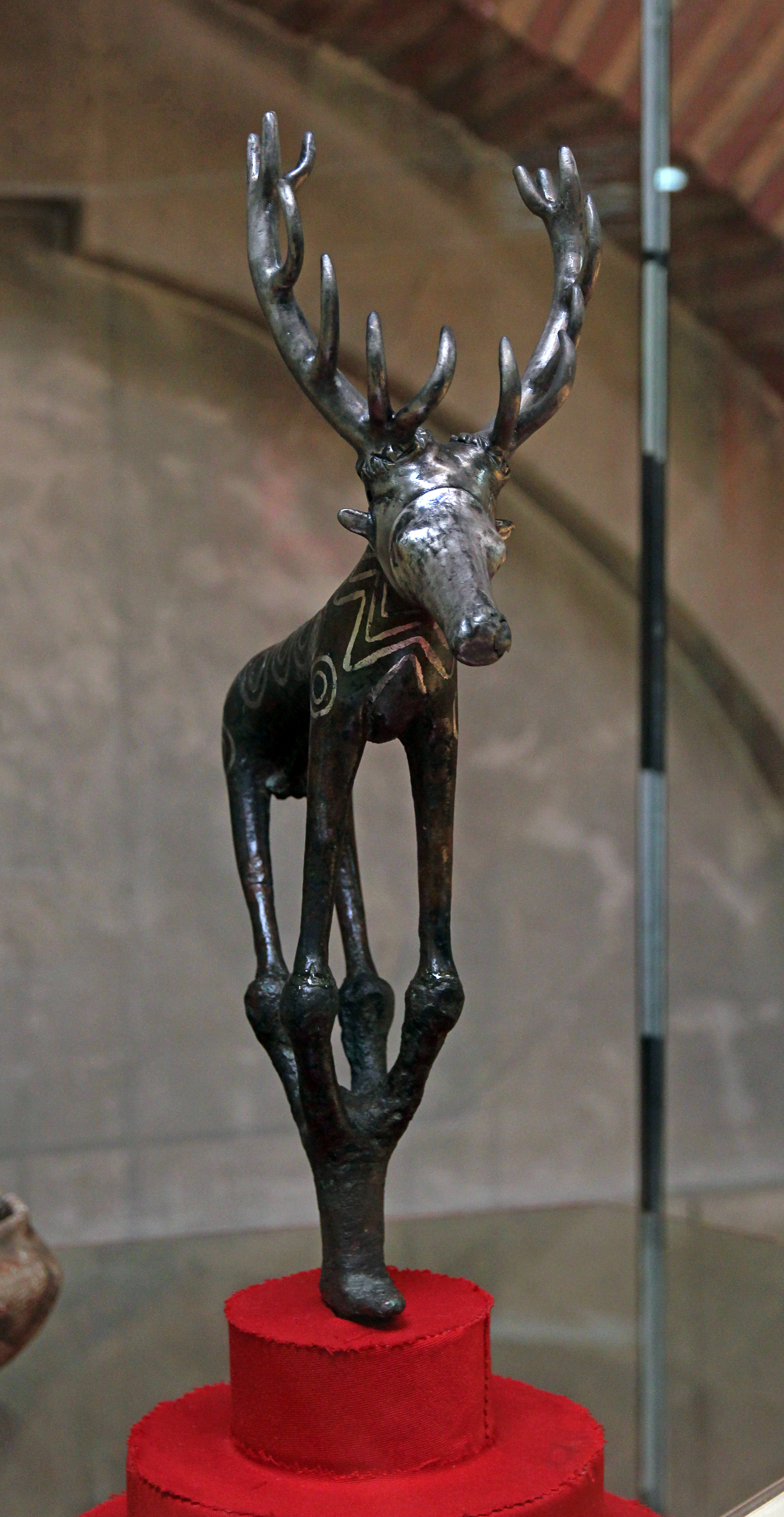
Deer with silver decoration

The Alaca Höyük bronze standards are a series of bronze objects found among the grave goods in the princely tombs of Alaca Höyük in Turkey. They are generally understood as cult instruments, probably to be attached to carts.

== Discovery ==
From 1935 to 1939, the Turkish archaeologists Hamit Zübeyir Koşay and Remzi Oğuz Arık investigated the site of Alaca Höyük, near Alaca, Çorum Province. In the process they uncovered 14 tombs of the early Bronze Age, which were named the "Princely tombs" or "Kingly tombs". Numerous grave offerings were found next to the burials—individually or in pairs—including more than twenty bronze standards.

== Description ==
The archaeologist Winfried Orthmann divides the standards into two main groups, one group consists of individual animals and the other of discs or rings (with or without images of animals). He subdivides these two groups based on the shape and contents of the discs or rings, and based on the type of creatures depicted.

The individual animals are all deer or bulls. The feet stand on four supports which converge at a point where it probably attached to a perishable wooden pole. The deer have expansive antlers, the cows have long curved horns. The highly stylised bodies are partially decorated with silver inlay and silver or gold leaf highlights the antlers and noses.

The disc or ring-shaped standards are round, half-circular or lozenge shaped. Several have a grill in the centre, surrounded by bands decorated with projections in the shape of birds, flowers or rays of the Sun. Most feature animals, which are very similar to the individual animals. Deer and bulls are particularly common on these, also, but unlike the individual animal standards, they sometimes appear in groups. Thus for example, a deer appears flanked by two bulls in one; in another, two lions or panthers stand to the left and right of a deer, which faces in the opposite direction. Another example depicts an animal which might be a roe deer or an onager. At the bottom of the disc or ring are a pair of horns, projecting outward and upward. At the bottom there is a cross bar with two pegs, which probably connected the standard to its pole.

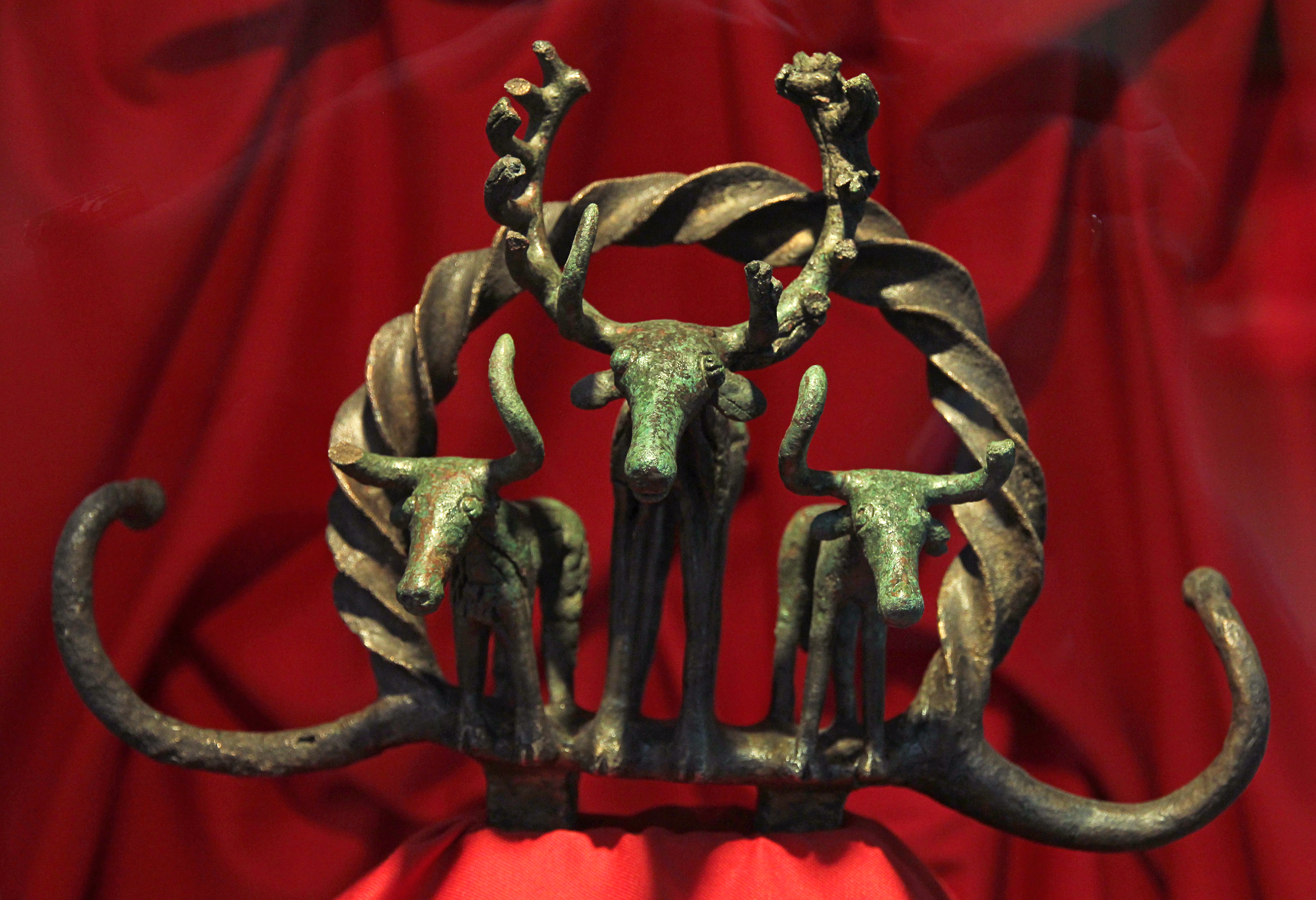
Ring shaped standard with deer and two bulls

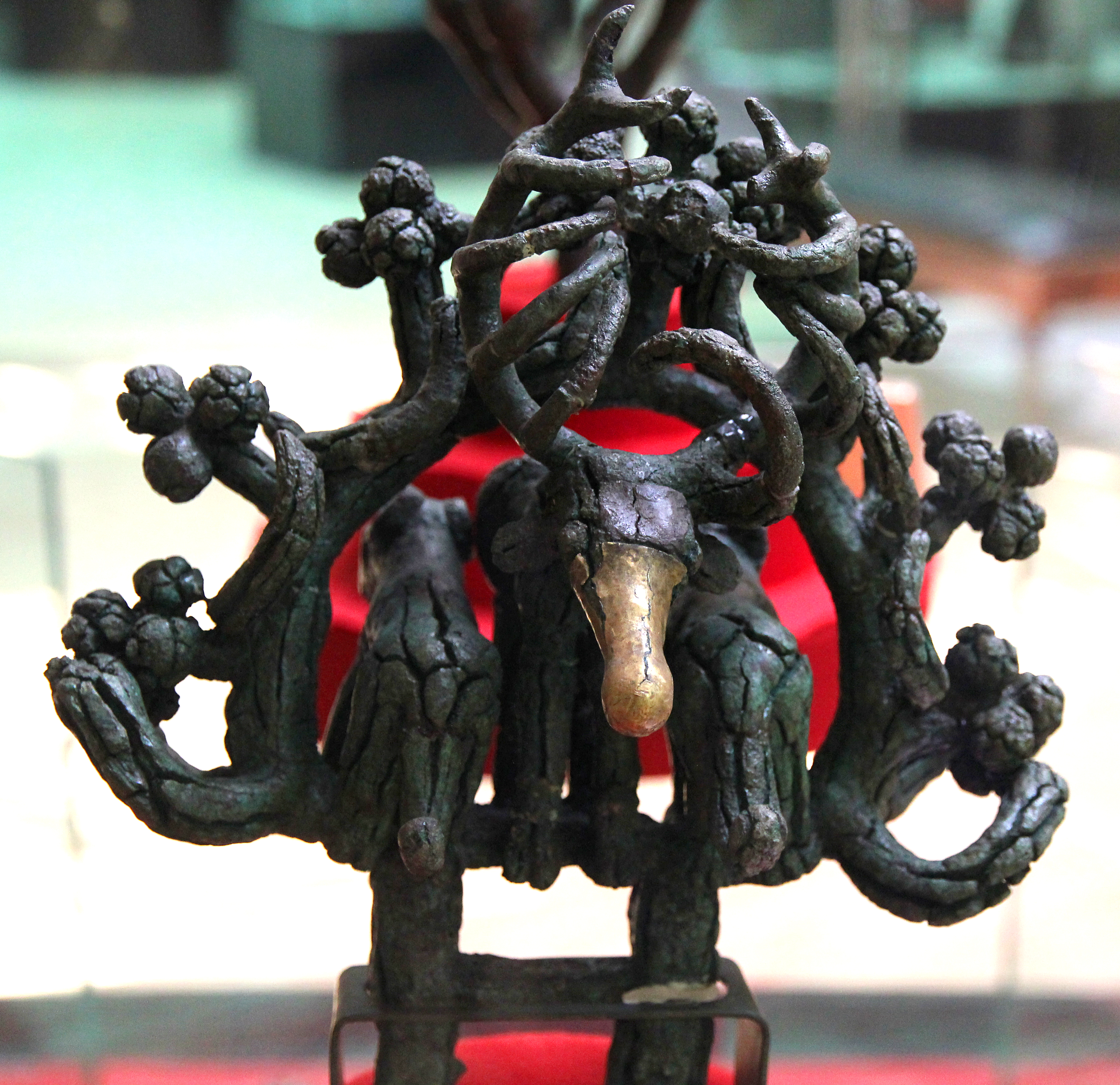
Deer with gold nose and two lions/panthers

== Interpretation ==
Only very limited explanations of the meaning and function of the artefacts are possible. The excavators, Koşay und Arık, assumed a clear ritual role and based the rest of their interpretations on that. On account of the Sun ray decoration on some of the standards they are often known as "Sun discs", with the rings interpreted as symbols of the heavens. This interpretation is supported by Kurt Bittel, among others.

The most popular theory on their function was proposed by Seton Lloyd and James Mellaart and developed by Orthmann. They argued that the standards were part of a wagon buried with the deceased in the grave. The standards would, on this theory, have been located on the drawbar, perhaps where it met with the yoke. The term "standard" derives from this theory. Similar wagon standards are known from Ur and Kish in Mesopotamia as well as the bronze age kurgans of Lčašen and Lalajan in Armenia. There rings for the reins have been found, which Orthamann connects with the Alaca Höyük standards. He takes the presence of pairs of bull skulls and foot bones in the graves, arranged in a pattern similar to a yoked pair as further evidence. Whether the disc and round-shaped standards here were used for guiding the reins, like the examples in Armenia and Mesopotamia, must remain a possibility. Yet in that case, it is unclear why no remains of these wagons have been found in the tombs—extensive remains of the wooden covers of the graves have survived.

Similar finds at Horoztepe were interpreted as sistrums by the excavator there, the Turkish archaeologist Tahsin Özgüç, on account of the moving parts.

== Date ==
The archaeologist Karl Bittel says that based on the pottery in the princely graves, a date before the establishment of the Assyrian trading colonies in Asia Minor (i.e. before 1900 BC) is to be assumed. He drew parallels between the metal objects in the tombs and those from Troy II, which date from around 2100 BC. From the different levels of burials and the stylistic development of the grave goods, it appears that the cemetery functioned for a long time, possibly more than two hundred years, between the 22nd and 20th centuries BC—the period of the Hattians, before the rise of the Hittite Empire.

== Reception ==
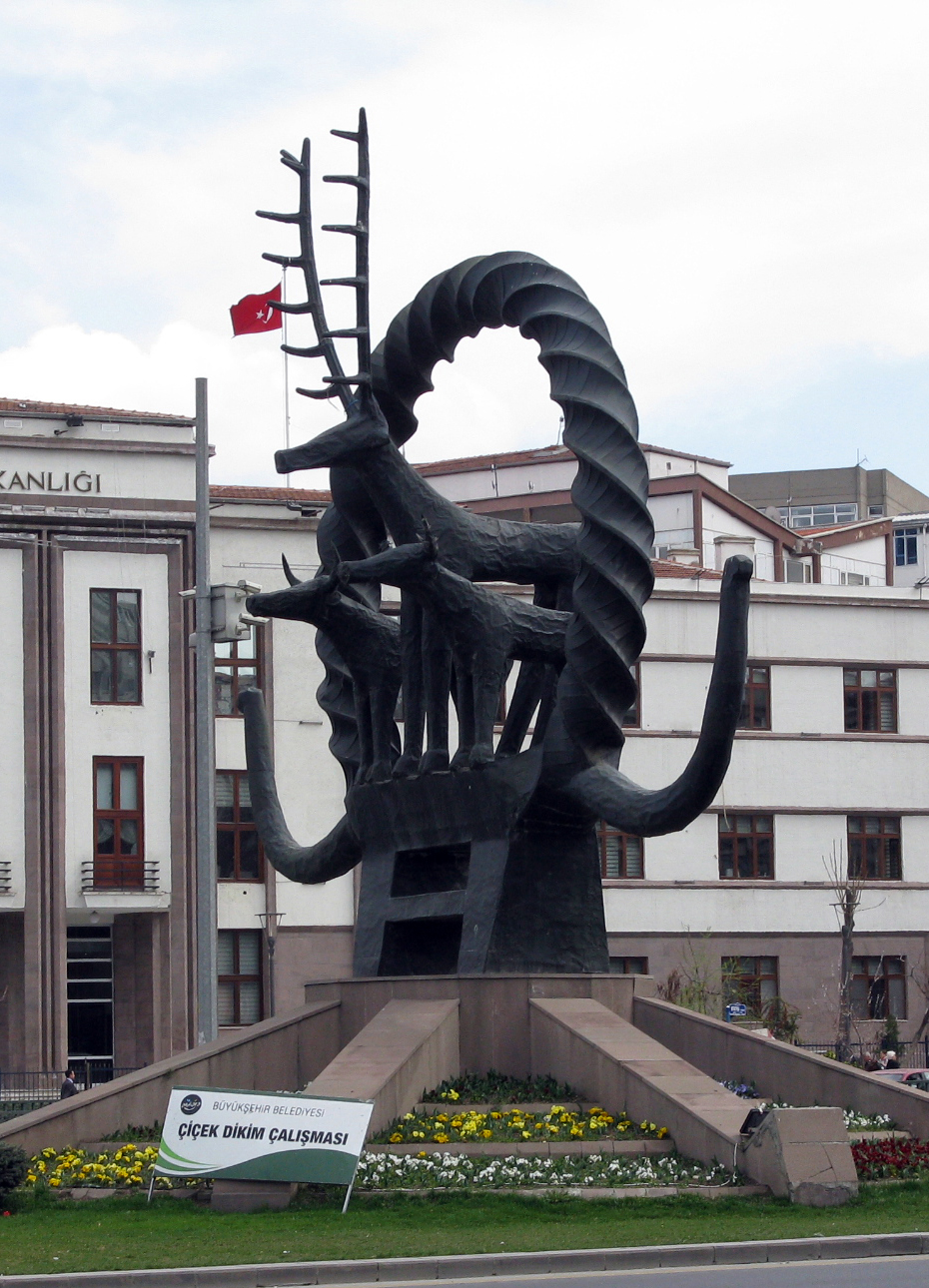
Hittite Sun Course Monument in Sıhhiye Square in Ankara

The Alaca Höyük bronze standards are used in stylised form by various organisations as logos, such as the University of Ankara, the city, and the province of Çorum. A massive reproduction of one of the standards stands in the middle of Sıhhiye Square in Ankara.

The standards are mostly displayed in the Museum of Anatolian Civilizations in Ankara, with some in the local museum of Alaca Höyük. Replicas of the graves and the standards are on display in the Çorum Archaeological Museum.

== See also ==
- Hittite Art
- Luristan bronze

== Bibliography ==
- Winfried Orthmann: "Zu den Standarten aus Alaca Höyük" Istanbuler Mitteilungen 17, 1967, pp. 34–54.
- Kurt Bittel: Die Hethiter - Die Kunst Anatoliens vom Ende des 3. bis Anfang des 2. Jahrtausends vor Christus. C. H. Beck München 1976, ISBN 3 406 03024 6, pp. 30–48
- Jutta Börker-Klähn, Ute Krafzik: "Zur Bedeutung der Aufsätze aus Alaca Höyük" Die Welt des Orients Vol. 17, 1986, pp. 47–60
