= Angaria =

Angaria may refer to:

== Places ==
- Angria, a region in Germany, sometimes called Angaria
- Angaria, Jhalokhati, in Dhaja, Bangladesh
- Angaria, Patuakhali, in Barisal, Bangladesh

== Other uses ==
- Angaria (Roman law), a postal system
- Angaria (gastropod), a genus of molluscs
- Angaria: Lasi tribe of Pakistan.

== See also ==
- Angary, aspect of laws of war
- Angara (disambiguation)
