= Angaar =

Angaar (lit. 'Ember' in Sanskrit and other Indian languages) may refer to:

- Angaar (1992 film), an Indian Hindi-language crime drama film
- Angaar (2016 film), an Indo-Bangladeshi romantic action musical film

== See also ==
- Angarey (disambiguation)
- Angaaray (disambiguation)
- Angar (disambiguation)
- Angara (disambiguation)
- Angaarey, 1975 Indian film
- Angaara, 1996 Indian film
- Angaaraka, 2014 Indian film
