= Aivarnadu =

- village
- Aivarnadu is in Dakshina Kannada district
- Country: India
- Tulunadu: Karnataka
- District: Dakshina Kannada
- Talukas: Sullia

Government
  - Body: Village Panchayat

Languages
  - Official: Kannada
- Time zone: UTC+5:30 (IST)
- ISO 3166 code: IN-KA
- Vehicle registration: KA
- Nearest city: Mangalore
- Civic agency: Village Panchayat
- Website: karnataka.gov.in

Aivarnadu is a village in the southern state of Karnataka, India. It is located in the Sulya taluk of Dakshina Kannada district.

== See also ==
- Mangalore
- Dakshina Kannada
- Districts of Karnataka
