= Angar =

Angar may refer to:

== Geography ==
- Angar, a village and a Gram Panchayat in Mohol, Maharashtra, India
  - Angar, a railway station - see List of railway stations in India
- Angar-e Chaleh, also known as Angar, a village in Kerman Province, Iran
- Hanger River, also transliterated as Angar River, Ethiopia
- Angara (Buryat and Mongolian: Angar), a river in Siberia

== Arts and entertainment ==
- Angar, a 1959 play by Utpal Dutt
- Angar the Screamer, Marvel Comics villain David A. Angar

== See also ==
- Angaar (disambiguation)
- Angara (disambiguation)
- Angarey (disambiguation)
