= Guthigaru =

Guthigaru Guthigar
- village
- Interactive map of Guthigaru
- Coordinates: 12.63173°N 75.53192°E
- Country: India
- State: Karnataka
- District: Dakshina Kannada
- Taluk: Sullia

Government
  - Type: Panchayat raj
  - Body: Gram panchayat

Population (2011)
  - Total: 4,211

Languages
  - Official: Kannada
  - Regional: Arebhashe, Tulu
- Time zone: UTC+5:30 (IST)
- PIN: 574218
- ISO 3166 code: IN-KA
- Vehicle registration: KA 21
- Nearest city: Sullia
- Lok Sabha constituency: Mangalore
- Website: karnataka.gov.in

Guthigaru or Guthigar is a village located in Sullia taluk of Dakshina Kannada district in Karnataka.

== Other links ==
- Elected member of Zilla Parishat
