= Angaaray =

Angaaray (lit. 'Embers' in Hindi-Urdu) may refer to these Indian films:

- Angaaray (1986 film), directed by Rajesh Seth with Rajesh Khanna in the lead role
- Angaaray (1998 film), directed by Mahesh Bhatt with Akshay Kumar in the lead role

== See also ==
- Angarey (disambiguation)
- Angaar (disambiguation)
- Angaarey, 1975 Indian film
