= Aivathoklu =

- village
- Aivathoklu is in Dakshina Kannada district
- Country: India
- State: Karnataka
- District: Dakshina Kannada
- Talukas: Sulya

Government
  - Body: Village Panchayat

Languages
  - Official: Kannada
- Time zone: UTC+5:30 (IST)
- ISO 3166 code: IN-KA
- Vehicle registration: KA
- Nearest city: Dakshina Kannada
- Civic agency: Village Panchayat
- Website: karnataka.gov.in

Aivathoklu is a village in the southern state of Karnataka, India. It is located in the Sulya taluk of Dakshina Kannada district in Karnataka.

== See also ==
- Dakshina Kannada
- Districts of Karnataka
