= Angora =

Angora may refer to:

== Places ==
- Angora, the historic name of Ankara, the capital city of Turkey
- Angora, Colorado
- Angora, Minnesota
- Angora Township, Minnesota
- Angora, Nebraska
- Angora, Philadelphia
  - Angora (SEPTA station), a commuter rail station
- Angora Lakes, a set of freshwater lakes in the Sierra Nevada, on the border of California and Nevada
  - Angora Fire, a 2007 forest fire near the lakes
- Angora Peak

== Fauna ==
- Angora wool, from an Angora rabbit
- Angora rabbit, one of at least 11 breeds of rabbit
- Angora goat, a breed of goat
- Peruvian guinea pig, formerly known as the Angora
- Angora ferret, a long-haired breed of ferret
- Turkish Angora, a breed of cat originally known as just Angora
- Oriental Longhair, a breed of cat formerly known as the British Angora

== Media ==
- Tygodnik Angora, a Polish language publication
- Angora (band), a musical group
- Drengene fra Angora, a Danish satire show

== See also ==
- Angara (disambiguation)
- Ankara (disambiguation)
- Angola (disambiguation)
