= Kunchadka =

- small village
- Location in Karnataka, India Kunchadka (India)
- Coordinates: 12.31°N 75.21°E
- Country: India
- State: Karnataka
- District: Dakshina Kannada
- Talukas: Sullia

Government
  - Type: Aletty
  - Body: Gram panchayat

Population (2001)
  - Total: 450

Languages
  - Official: Kannada
- Time zone: UTC+5:30 (IST)
- ISO 3166 code: IN-KA
- Vehicle registration: KA
- Website: karnataka.gov.in

Kunchadka is a small village in the southern state of Karnataka, India. It is located in the Aletty Village, Sullia taluk of Dakshina Kannada district in Karnataka.

== Dialect ==
The Arebhashe dialect of Kannada is spoken mainly by the Gowda community. The official language is Kannada.Local language spoken Tulu.

== Freedom movement ==
- Amara Sullia Freedom Movement of 1837 Kunchadka Rama Gowda team captured the government treasury in Kasaragod

== Crops ==
- Areca nut
- Banana
- Black pepper
- Hevea brasiliensis

== See also ==
- Aletty
- Sullia
- Mangalore
- Dakshina Kannada
