= Sullia Assembly constituency =

Legislative Assembly constituency in Karnataka State, India

Coordinates: 12.56°N 75.39°E

Sullia
- Constituency No. 207 for the Karnataka Legislative Assembly

Constituency details
- Country: India
- Region: South India
- State: Karnataka
- District: Dakshina Kannada
- Lok Sabha constituency: Dakshina Kannada
- Established: 1956
- Total electors: 206,210 (2023)
- Reservation: SC

Member of Legislative Assembly
- 16th Karnataka Legislative Assembly
- Incumbent Bhagirathi Murulya
- Party: Bharatiya Janata Party
- Elected year: 2023
- Preceded by: S. Angara

Sullia Assembly constituency is one of the 224 Legislative Assembly constituencies of Karnataka in India.

It is part of Dakshina Kannada district and is reserved for candidates belonging to the Scheduled Castes.

== Members of the Legislative Assembly ==
Election	Member	Party
1962	S. Subbayya Naik	Indian National Congress
1967	A. Ramachandra	Swatantra Party
1972	P. D. Bangera	Indian National Congress
1978	A. Ramachandra	Janata Party
1983	Bakila Hukrappa	Bharatiya Janata Party
1985	K. Kushala	Indian National Congress
1989	K. Kushala	Indian National Congress
1994	S. Angara	Bharatiya Janata Party
1999	S. Angara	Bharatiya Janata Party
2004	S. Angara	Bharatiya Janata Party
2008	S. Angara	Bharatiya Janata Party
2013	S. Angara	Bharatiya Janata Party
2018	S. Angara	Bharatiya Janata Party
2023	Bhageerathi Murulya	Bharatiya Janata Party

== Election results ==
=== Assembly Election 2023 ===
2023 Karnataka Legislative Assembly election : Sullia
Party	Candidate	Votes	%	±%
BJP	Bhageerathi Murulya	93,911	57.01%	▲0.48
INC	G. Krishnappa Ramakunja	63,037	38.27%	▼2.78
NOTA	None of the above	2,562	1.56%	▲0.78
JD(S)	H. L. Venkatesh	1,850	1.12%	New
AAP	Sumana Bellarkar	1,587	0.96%	New
Margin of victory		30,874	18.74%	▲3.26
Turnout		166,077	80.54%	▼4.34
Total valid votes		164,732		
Registered electors		206,210		▲3.72
BJP hold		Swing	▲0.48	

=== Assembly Election 2018 ===
2018 Karnataka Legislative Assembly election : Sullia
Party	Candidate	Votes	%	±%
BJP	S. Angara	95,205	56.53%	▲13.69
INC	Dr. B. Raghu	69,137	41.05%	▼0.90
BSP	Raghu	1,472	0.87%	New
NOTA	None of the above	1,310	0.78%	New
Margin of victory		26,068	15.48%	▲14.59
Turnout		168,768	84.88%	▲3.81
Total valid votes		168,412		
Registered electors		198,823		▲10.35
BJP hold		Swing	▲13.69	

=== Assembly Election 2013 ===
2013 Karnataka Legislative Assembly election : Sullia
Party	Candidate	Votes	%	±%
BJP	S. Angara	65,913	42.84%	▼6.57
INC	Dr. B. Raghu	64,540	41.95%	▼3.96
JD(S)	Nandaraj Sankesh	8,551	5.56%	▲2.70
SDPI	M. Koosappa	2,569	1.67%	New
Independent	G. Kunhiraman	1,380	0.90%	New
KJP	Chandravathi	1,001	0.65%	New
Margin of victory		1,373	0.89%	▼2.60
Turnout		146,078	81.07%	▲5.37
Total valid votes		153,856		
Registered electors		180,177		▲10.08
BJP hold		Swing	▼6.57	

=== Assembly Election 2008 ===
2008 Karnataka Legislative Assembly election : Sullia
Party	Candidate	Votes	%	±%
BJP	S. Angara	61,144	49.41%	▼3.54
INC	Dr. B. Raghu	56,822	45.91%	▲7.67
JD(S)	Sharaschandra	3,538	2.86%	▼2.70
BSP	Ramesh Mundodi	2,256	1.82%	▲0.40
Margin of victory		4,322	3.49%	▼11.22
Turnout		123,905	75.70%	▼3.71
Total valid votes		123,760		
Registered electors		163,680		▲11.94
BJP hold		Swing	▼3.54	

=== Assembly Election 2004 ===
2004 Karnataka Legislative Assembly election : Sullia
Party	Candidate	Votes	%	±%
BJP	S. Angara	61,480	52.95%	▲0.44
INC	Dr. B. Raghu	44,395	38.24%	▼7.56
JD(S)	K. Kushala	6,460	5.56%	▲3.87
Kannada Nadu Party	Raja Pallamajalu	2,127	1.83%	New
BSP	Soorappa Hathyadka. T	1,645	1.42%	New
Margin of victory		17,085	14.71%	▲8.01
Turnout		116,110	79.41%	▲0.17
Total valid votes		116,107		
Registered electors		146,221		▲8.78
BJP hold		Swing	▲0.44	

=== Assembly Election 1999 ===
1999 Karnataka Legislative Assembly election : Sullia
Party	Candidate	Votes	%	±%
BJP	S. Angara	54,814	52.51%	▲1.30
INC	K. Kushala	47,817	45.80%	▲9.37
JD(S)	Lolakasha	1,762	1.69%	New
Margin of victory		6,997	6.70%	▼8.08
Turnout		106,512	79.24%	▲1.61
Total valid votes		104,393		
Rejected ballots		2,119	1.99%	▲0.79
Registered electors		134,415		▲1.31
BJP hold		Swing	▲1.30	

=== Assembly Election 1994 ===
1994 Karnataka Legislative Assembly election : Sullia
Party	Candidate	Votes	%	±%
BJP	S. Angara	52,113	51.21%	▲19.32
INC	K. Kushala	37,069	36.43%	▼2.18
JD	M. Hukra	10,072	9.90%	▼16.37
INC	Bakila Hukrappa	2,510	2.47%	New
Margin of victory		15,044	14.78%	▲8.06
Turnout		103,003	77.63%	▲2.18
Total valid votes		101,764		
Rejected ballots		1,239	1.20%	▼3.20
Registered electors		132,679		▲10.10
BJP gain from INC		Swing	▲12.60	

=== Assembly Election 1989 ===
1989 Karnataka Legislative Assembly election : Sullia
Party	Candidate	Votes	%	±%
INC	K. Kushala	33,560	38.61%	▼2.05
BJP	S. Angara	27,720	31.89%	▲13.75
JD	Bakila Hukrappa	22,836	26.27%	New
JP	Sanjaya	2,809	3.23%	New
Margin of victory		5,840	6.72%	▲5.46
Turnout		90,929	75.45%	▲6.05
Total valid votes		86,925		
Rejected ballots		4,004	4.40%	▲3.56
Registered electors		120,510		▲32.02
INC hold		Swing	▼2.05	

=== Assembly Election 1985 ===
1985 Karnataka Legislative Assembly election : Sullia
Party	Candidate	Votes	%	±%
INC	K. Kushala	25,542	40.66%	▲10.73
JP	Bakila Hukrappa	24,749	39.40%	▲26.63
BJP	Agrahara Duggappa	11,391	18.14%	▼24.50
Independent	Chandra Lingam	1,130	1.80%	New
Margin of victory		793	1.26%	▼11.45
Turnout		63,346	69.40%	▲2.90
Total valid votes		62,812		
Rejected ballots		534	0.84%	▼0.75
Registered electors		91,279		▲15.93
INC gain from BJP		Swing	▼1.98	

=== Assembly Election 1983 ===
1983 Karnataka Legislative Assembly election : Sullia
Party	Candidate	Votes	%	±%
BJP	Bakila Hukrappa	21,975	42.64%	New
INC	N. Sheena	15,426	29.93%	▲25.29
Independent	K. Raja	7,550	14.65%	New
JP	Venkatesh	6,582	12.77%	▼31.77
Margin of victory		6,549	12.71%	▲6.67
Turnout		52,363	66.50%	▼8.45
Total valid votes		51,533		
Rejected ballots		830	1.59%	▼0.38
Registered electors		78,738		▲6.70
BJP gain from JP		Swing	▼1.90	

=== Assembly Election 1978 ===
1978 Karnataka Legislative Assembly election : Sullia
Party	Candidate	Votes	%	±%
JP	A. Ramachandra	24,148	44.54%	New
INC(I)	P. D. Bangera	20,874	38.50%	New
CPI(M)	B. Ramakrishna	6,482	11.96%	New
INC	M. Bhaskar Naik	2,515	4.64%	▼58.38
Margin of victory		3,274	6.04%	▼24.77
Turnout		55,305	74.95%	▲17.24
Total valid votes		54,217		
Rejected ballots		1,088	1.97%	▲1.97
Registered electors		73,792		▲12.92
JP gain from INC		Swing	▼18.48	

=== Assembly Election 1972 ===
1972 Mysore State Legislative Assembly election : Sullia
Party	Candidate	Votes	%	±%
INC	P. D. Bangera	23,089	63.02%	▲17.31
ABJS	Mundara	11,802	32.21%	New
Independent	K. Subbayya Naika	1,246	3.40%	New
Independent	U. Narasayya	499	1.36%	New
Margin of victory		11,287	30.81%	▲30.09
Turnout		37,714	57.71%	▼5.81
Total valid votes		36,636		
Registered electors		65,348		▲16.79
INC gain from SWA		Swing	▲16.59	

=== Assembly Election 1967 ===
1967 Mysore State Legislative Assembly election : Sullia
Party	Candidate	Votes	%	±%
SWA	A. Ramachandra	15,487	46.43%	▲7.85
INC	K. B. Naika	15,247	45.71%	▼3.67
Independent	K. B. Mohandas	2,622	7.86%	New
Margin of victory		240	0.72%	▼10.08
Turnout		35,538	63.52%	▲10.28
Total valid votes		33,356		
Registered electors		55,952		▲9.22
SWA gain from INC		Swing	▼2.95	

=== Assembly Election 1962 ===
1962 Mysore State Legislative Assembly election : Sullia
Party	Candidate	Votes	%	±%
INC	K. Subbayya Naika	12,787	49.38%	New
SWA	Venkappa Naika	9,991	38.58%	New
CPI	Venkappa	1,871	7.22%	New
ABJS	Krishna	1,248	4.82%	New
Margin of victory		2,796	10.80%	
Turnout		27,276	53.24%	
Total valid votes		25,897		
Registered electors		51,231		
INC win (new seat)				

== See also ==
- List of constituencies of the Karnataka Legislative Assembly
- Dakshina Kannada district
- Bhageerathi Murulya
