= Amaramudnooru =

- village
- Location in Karnataka, India Amaramudnooru (India)
- Coordinates: 12°35′27″N 75°26′42″E
- Country: India
- State: Karnataka
- Region: Tulu nadu
- District: Dakshina Kannada

Government
  - MLA: S. Angara

Languages
  - tulu arebhashe Kannada official: Kannada
- Time zone: UTC+5:30 (IST)
- PIN: 574248,574212
- Telephone code: 91-8257
- Vehicle registration: KA-21
- Nearest city: Mangalore

Amaramudnooru or Amaramudnur (Village ID 617765) is a small village in the Sullia taluk, Dakshina Kannada District, India. According to the 2011 census it has a population of 4052 living in 895 households.

This village consists of places like Kukkujadka, Doddathota, Pailar. This village is connected by Jalsooru Subramanya Road through Doddathota and Paichar Bengamale road to Kukkujadka.

The village has two branches of Vijaya Bank are working in Doddathota and Kukkujadka. One sub post office is located at Doddathota and one Telephone Exchange and JTO Groups office is at Doddathota.

The village is surrounded by green forest. The people here grow arecanut, coconut, rubber and cocoa. Its headquarters are in Kukkujadka.

The village has many educational institutions that include Chokkadi High School, GUPS Doddathota, GPS Pailar and Kukkujadka.
