= Angarsky (rural locality) =

Angarsky (Russian: Анга́рский; masculine), Angarskaya (Анга́рская; feminine), or Angarskoye (Анга́рское; neuter) is the name of several rural localities in Russia:

- Angarsky, Irkutsk Oblast, a settlement in Alarsky District of Ust-Orda Buryat Okrug of Irkutsk Oblast
- Angarsky, Krasnoyarsk Krai, a settlement in Angarsky Selsoviet of Boguchansky District of Krasnoyarsk Krai
