= Ajjavara =

- village
- Location in Karnataka, India Ajjavara (India)
- Coordinates: 12.553396°N 75.343434°E
- Country: India
- State: Karnataka
- District: Dakshina Kannada
- Talukas: Sullia

Government
  - Body: Gram panchayat

Population (2001)
  - Total: 6,692

Languages
  - Official: Kannada
- Time zone: UTC+5:30 (IST)
- ISO 3166 code: IN-KA
- Vehicle registration: KA
- Website: karnataka.gov.in

Ajjavara is a village in the southern Indian state of Karnataka. It is located in the Sullia taluk of Dakshina Kannada district in Karnataka.

== Demographics ==
As of 2001 Indian census, Ajjavara had a population of 6692 with 3406 males and 3286 females.

== Temples ==
The Mahishamardhini Temple in Ajjavara attracts devotees from the surrounding villages. There is a Veda Pathashaala near it.

== See also ==
- Dakshina Kannada
- Districts of Karnataka
