= Bhageerathi Murulya =

Indian politician

Member of the Karnataka Legislative Assembly
- Incumbent
- Assumed office 20 May 2023
- Preceded by: S. Angara
- Constituency: Sullia

Personal details
- Born: 1 June 1974 (age 52) Murulya, Sullia Taluk, Dakshina Kannada
- Party: Bharatiya Janata Party

Bhageerathi Murulya (born 1 June 1974) is an Indian politician who is serving as the Member of the Karnataka Legislative Assembly from the Sullia Assembly constituency. A member of the Bharatiya Janata Party, she was elected to the Assembly in the 2023 Karnataka Legislative Assembly election.

Her election made her the first woman to represent Sullia in the Assembly. She also became the first Dalit woman from the coastal Karnataka to be elected to the Assembly.

She is a member of the women's and children's welfare committee. Murulya belongs to the Tulu-speaking Adi Dravida community, and she was the poorest candidate to win a seat in the assembly. Murulya had worked as a tailor and a teacher before becoming a MLA. Murulya took the oath in the name of her family deity.
