= Naciye Suman =

First Turkish female Muslim photographer

- Born: 23 April 1881; Üsküp, Ottoman Empire
- Died: 23 July 1973 (aged 92); Ankara, Turkey
- Other names: Naciye Hanım
- Occupation: photographer
- Years active: 1919–1930
- Known for: First Turkish, Muslim professional woman photographer
- Spouse: Ýsmail Hakký Bey (aka İsmail Hakkı Bey)

Naciye Suman (23 April 1881 – 23 July 1973), known through her career as Madame Naciye or Naciye Hanım, was the first Turkish Muslim professional woman photographer. When Turkish titles were abolished in favor of fixed hereditary surnames, she chose the surname Suman. After learning photography in Austria, she opened a studio in her home in 1919. Her clients were mostly women and she took portraits and bridal pictures. Later, she taught photography classes at the sultan's palace.

== Early life ==
Naciye was born on 23 April 1881 in Üsküp, Ottoman Empire, in what is now part of Macedonia to Major Salih Bey. She was styled for a portion of her life with the title Hanım (meaning "lady" or "madame"). In 1903, she married a captain Ýsmail Hakký Bey (aka İsmail Hakkı Bey). She had three children: Nusret Suman, who would become a sculptor; and two daughters Fikret and Nedret. As a result of the forced migration during the Balkan Wars of 1912–1913, the family was forced to migrate to Anatolia. During the migration, Suman lost her fourth child near the Hungarian border. Though the family made it to Istanbul, a trusted friend helped them escape the conflict relocating them to Vienna. Photography at that time was a novelty, and Suman studied to learn the skill. The following year, 1914, her husband was called back to Turkey and the family, which included Suman, her husband, three children, his mother, a grandmother and three servants, were moved into the Saitpaşa Mansion in Yıldız in the Beşiktaş district of Istanbul. She brought her camera equipment with her and set up a small studio in the laundry area of the rooftop.

== Career ==
During World War I, Suman's husband was deployed to the front, and she was left at home to care for the household. The war was followed by the Turkish War of Independence and times were difficult. In 1919, when she had to sell the family silver to provide for the family, she decided on another solution. Suman hung a sign on the front of the mansion which said simply "Türk Hanımlar Fotoğrafhanesi-Naciye" (Turkish woman photographer-Naciye") and began working as the first professional Muslim woman photographer in Turkey. During this period, women were veiled and did not work, especially those who were daughters of a pasha, and yet from the first day, she had clients. Many women, who had men fighting at the front wanted photographs to enclose in letters.

In 1921, she gave up the mansion and moved to a small apartment, moving her studio to a separate location. The business was featured that same year in Kadınlar Dünyası (Women's World), the leading women's magazine of the era. Besides taking wedding pictures, she also lectured at the Sultan Reşad's palace on photography. When the war ended, Suman left her husband and continued her photography business until 1930. That year, when her daughter had a baby, Suman closed the shop and moved to Ankara. In 1934, when the Turkish regime passed the Surname Law, allowing citizens to adopt hereditary surnames rather than using titles, Naciye took "Suman" as a last name.

Suman died on 23 July 1973 in Ankara, Turkey. It was believed that her photographs were lost, but collector and writer, Gülderen Bölük, has been able to document postcards with the studio stamp and preserve six of them.
