= Angarsky =

Angarsky (masculine), Angarskaya (feminine), or Angarskoye (neuter) may refer to:

- Angarsky District, a district of Irkutsk Oblast, Russia
- Angarskoye Urban Okrug, a municipal formation which Angarsky District in Irkutsk Oblast, Russia is incorporated as
- Angarskoye Urban Settlement, a former municipal formation which the city of Angarsk in Angarsky District of Irkutsk Oblast, Russia was incorporated as
- Angarsky (rural locality), several rural localities in Russia
- Angarskyi Pass, a mountain pass in Crimea, Ukraine
