= Ankara (whisky) =

Ankara Whisky
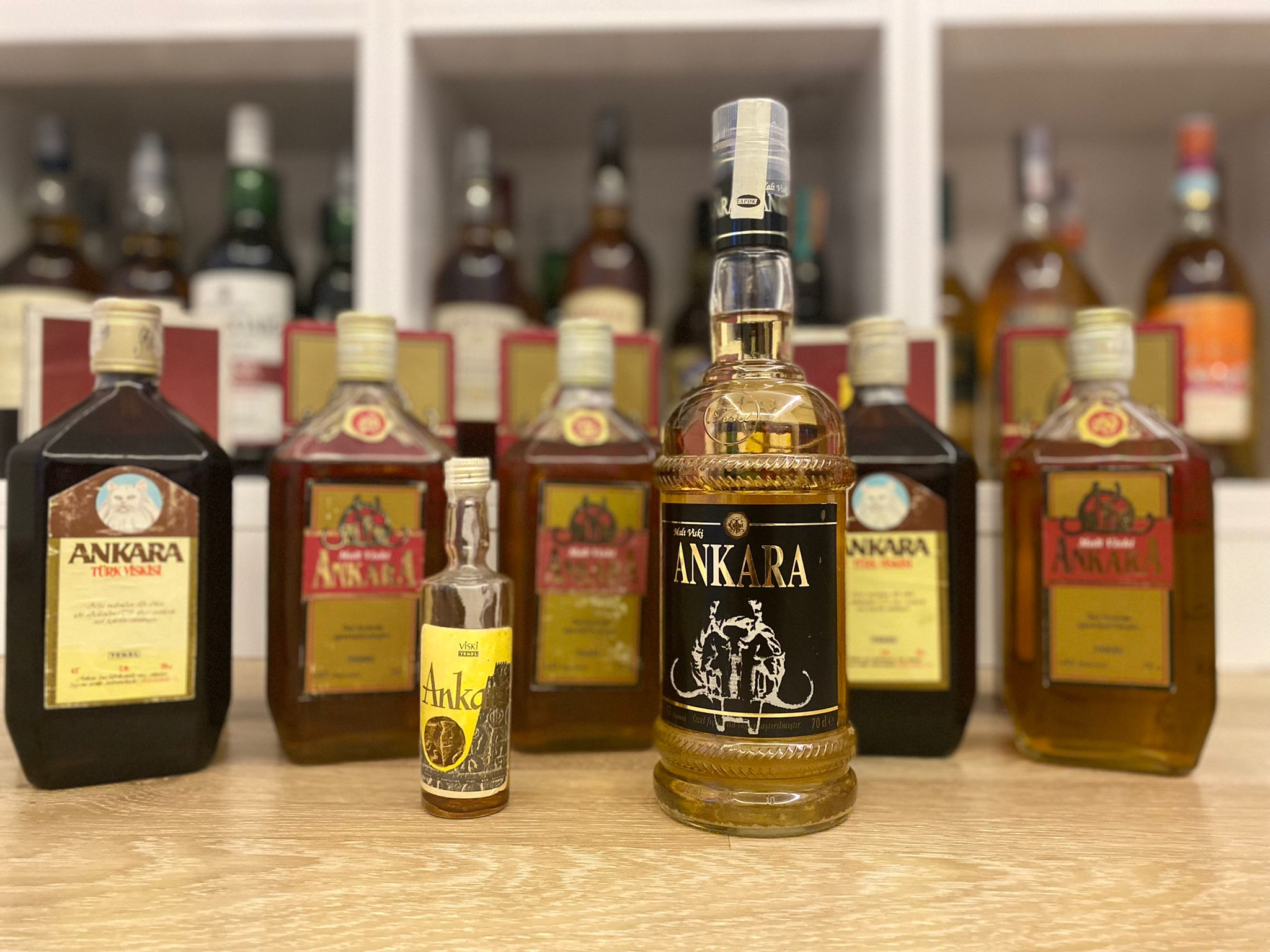
- Founded: 1963
- Founder: TEKEL
- Defunct: 2011
- Headquarters: Atatürk Forest Farm, Yenimahalle, Ankara, Turkey
- Owner: TEKEL (1963–2004); Mey (2004–2011); Diageo (2011)

Ankara Whisky was the first and only Turkish whisky produced in Turkey.

== History ==
In the 1960s, during a period of a closed and self-sufficient economy in Turkey, it was decided to produce a domestic whisky both to support domestic production and to prevent foreign exchange outflow from the country due to the import of alcoholic beverages. In this context, a small unit was established within the beer factory of TEKEL in Ankara in 1963, with special incentives given to Prof. Dr. Turgut Yazıcıoğlu by the government of the time. The production volume of this facility, which was a first in the country, was determined as 200,000 liters per year. Thus, the official process of manufacturing and branding the first Turkish whisky began.

Although production continued under TEKEL until the mid-2000s, the transition to an open economy in Turkey starting from the 1980s, which allowed the sale of imported alcoholic beverages, led to the gradual decline in the popularity of Ankara Whisky amid competition from many foreign whisky brands entering the market. Despite efforts to change the sales policy and promotion of the product, resulting in attempts to maintain its position in the domestic market, the production rights of Ankara Whisky were transferred to Mey İçki in 2004. After approximately a decade of production in this way, the brand was acquired by the global alcohol producer Diageo in 2011. Shortly after passing entirely into the hands of foreign investors, production of Ankara Whisky was discontinued.

== Production techniques and characteristics ==
Throughout the production process, grains and rice were used as the main ingredients for Ankara Whisky. Scottish and American techniques were adopted for technical matters, and oak barrels were preferred for the aging of the whisky. The aging period was determined as 5 years. Ankara Whisky, which was released for over 50 years, had bottles of various sizes and types, but it is not definitively known whether they differed in aroma and taste. Furthermore, after production ceased, the copper stills, produced in Gaziantep, and Scotch-style copper pot stills used in manufacturing were purchased by a foreign company and sent to the United States, while the barrels were sent to France.

Ankara Whisky underwent frequent changes in bottle design and emblem, using symbols such as the Hittite Sun Disk, the Grey Wolf recognized as a national symbol among Turks, and the local breed of cats in the city, known internationally as the Turkish Angora. With an alcohol content of 43%, the whisky was generally produced in 70 cl bottles. According to the personal website of Turkish whisky expert Bozkurt Karasu, Ankara Whisky had aromas of dried fruits, raisins, and dried plums on the nose, with a malty taste. The palate was described as harsh, with a burning sensation from young alcohol, and a spicy taste similar to Irish whiskey, with hints of young and damp wood, and dried sweet apricots. The finish was noted as short and spicy.
