= Abyssinian guinea pig =

Breed of guinea pig

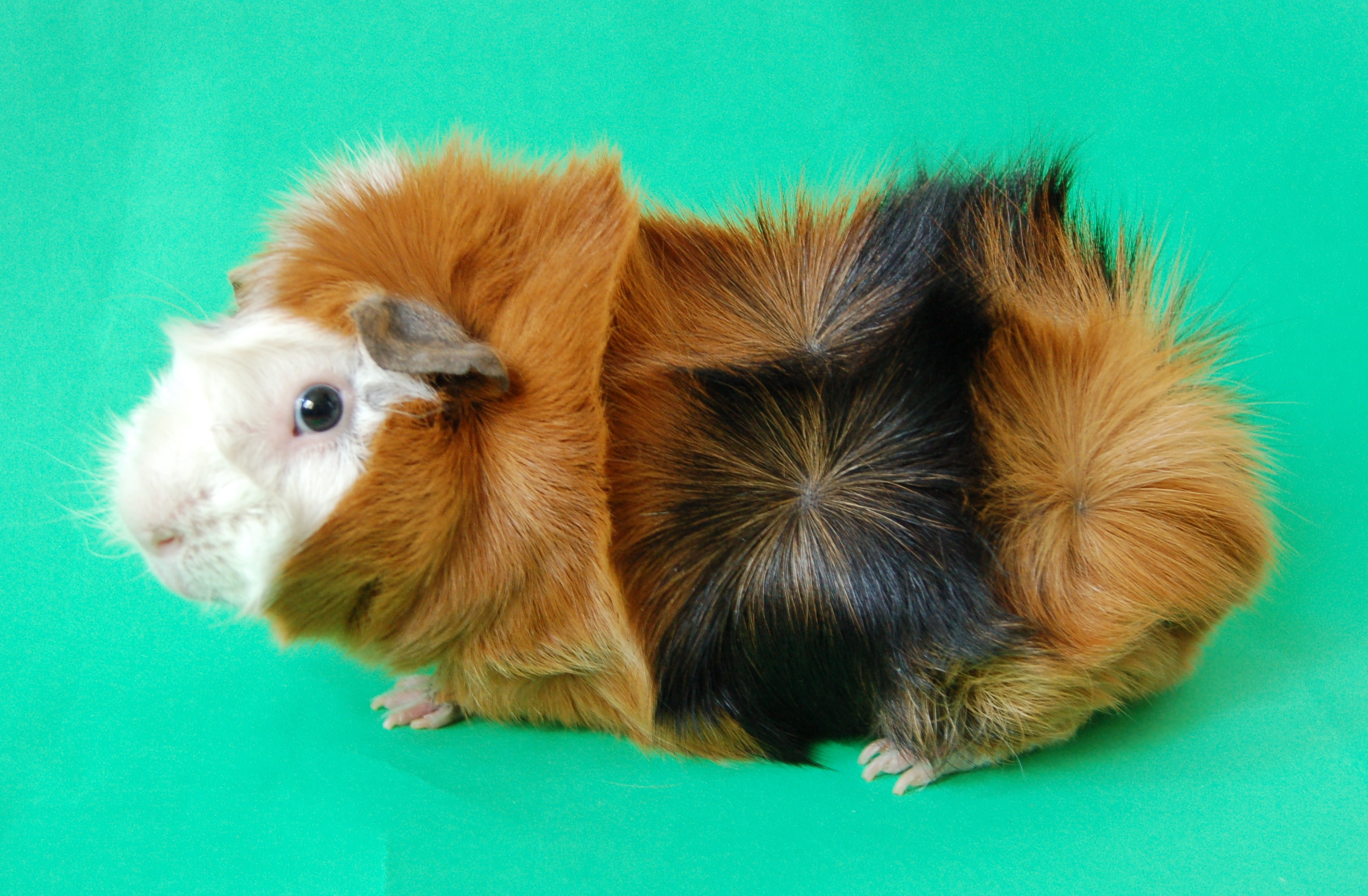
A male Abyssinian guinea pig

The Abyssinian is a breed of guinea pig that is relatively common as both a pet and show animal. The Abyssinian is set apart from other breeds of guinea pig by its coat, which is marked with radially growing swirls or cowlicks of hair referred to as rosettes.

== History ==
The Abyssinian is one of the oldest guinea pig breeds. Despite its name, it did not originate in Ethiopia, but rather appears to be of Incan origin. It drew much attention as an exhibition cavy in Victorian England due to its unique coat.

== Characteristics ==
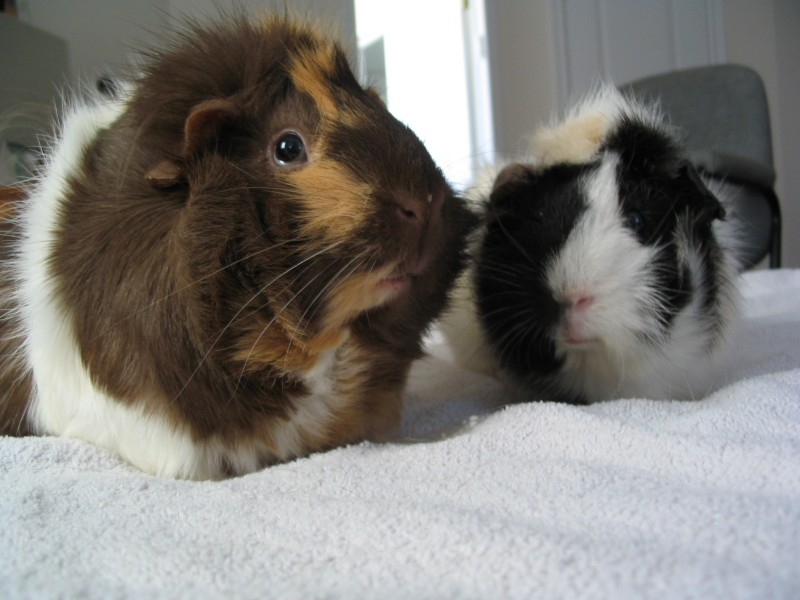
A pair of Abyssinians with part-colored coats

The Abyssinian is set apart from other guinea pigs by its unique coat. The hair of an Abyssinian is approximately an inch and a half long and is marked with swirls of hair known as rosettes. Abyssinians must have even-numbered rosettes. On a show quality Abyssinian, there will be eight or ten distinct rosettes: one on each shoulder, two or four on the back, one on each hip, and two on the rump. The fur comes in many colors and patterns, including self, tortoiseshell, brindle, and part-color. However, it is difficult to breed an Abyssinian with ideal rosettes, and many pet-quality cavies have imperfect coats. An Abyssinian also requires special grooming due to the unique nature of its coat. The Abyssinian is described as being more energetic than most other cavy breeds, but easier to train due to its inquisitive nature.

== Health ==
The Abyssinian requires frequent brushing to keep its coat from becoming tangled.

=== Roan ===
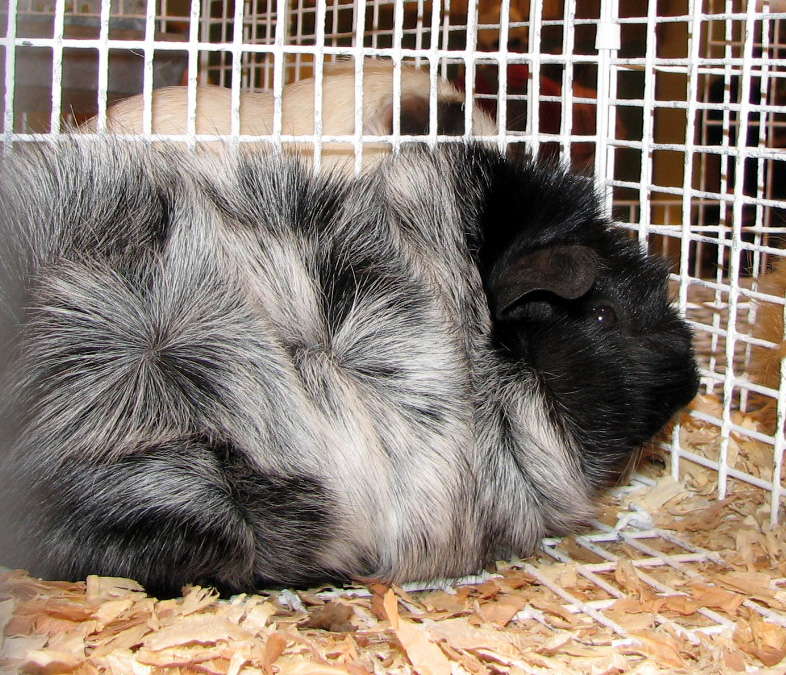
A black roan Abyssinian. This color is linked with potentially lethal defects.

Two roan Abyssinians should not be bred, because they will produce offspring with genetic problems linked to the white gene that produces the coloration, known as a "Lethal white". A roan Abyssinian can be safely bred to any other color, however.

== See also ==
- Peruvian guinea pig
- List of guinea pig breeds
