= Peruvian guinea pig =

Breed of guinea pig

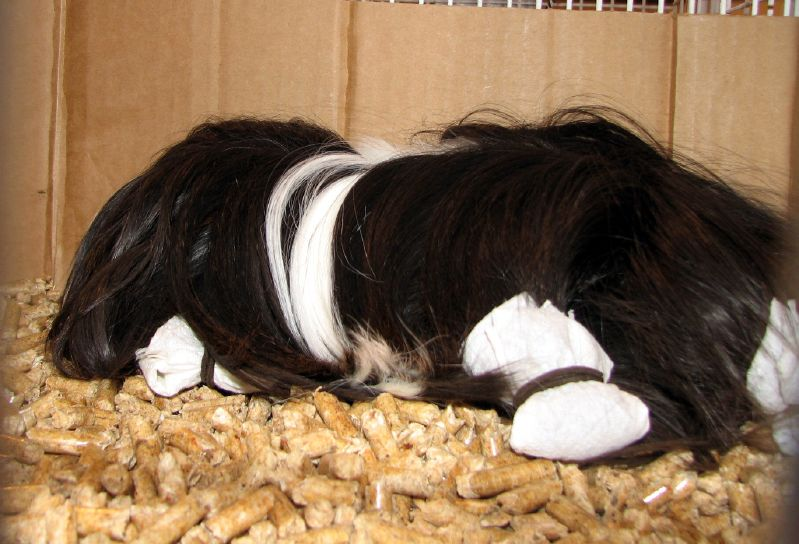
A show Peruvian with hair wraps

The Peruvian, formerly the Angora, is a Spanish breed of guinea pig.

== History ==
The Peruvian has a long smooth coat all over its body that may reach the floor, including a prominent "forelock" resulting from a portion of its coat on the head and the neck growing forward on the body. They have a middle parting and typically have rosettes on their head and thighs. Their long hair is an autosomal recessive characteristic that is inherited. When two different length hair types are crossed, the shorter hair length will be the dominant one shown.

Peruvians may come in a Satin variant, featuring a silkier and more lustrous coat.

The Peruvian is generally not recommended for first time guinea pig owners, due to the tediousness of grooming their long coat.

== See also ==
- Abyssinian guinea pig
- List of guinea pig breeds
