= Angarsky, Irkutsk Oblast =

Angarsky Ангарский
- Village
- Location within Irkutsk Oblast Location within Russia
- Coordinates: 53°27′N 103°21′E
- Country: Russia
- Region: Irkutsk Oblast
- District: Alarsky District
- Time zone: UTC+8:00

Angarsky (Russian: Ангарский) is a rural locality (a settlement) in Alarsky District, Irkutsk Oblast, Russia. Population: 564 (2010 census);

== Geography ==
This rural locality is located 39 kilometres (24 mi) from Kutulik (the district's administrative centre), 144 kilometres (89 mi) from Irkutsk (capital of Irkutsk Oblast) and 4,360 kilometres (2,710 mi) from Moscow. Seredkino is the nearest rural locality.
