= Nusret Suman =

Turkish sculptor and painter

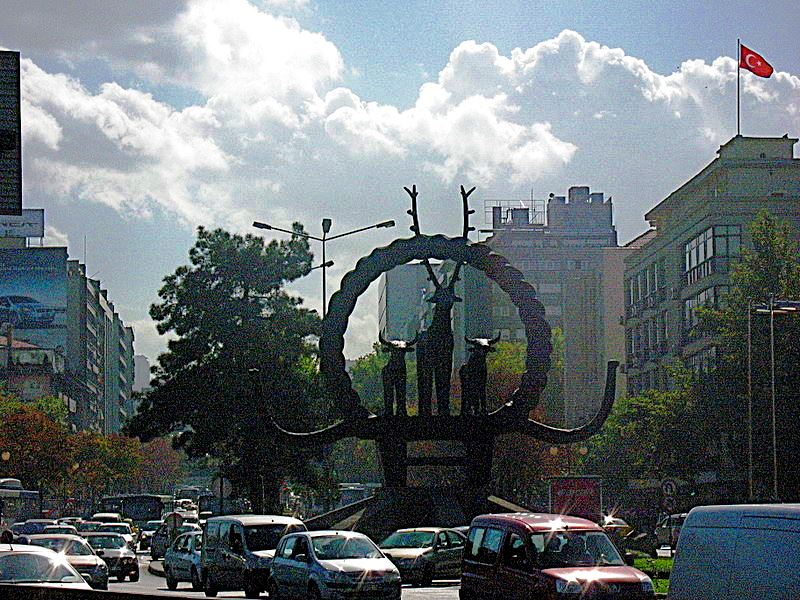
- Suman's Hittite Sun Course Monument in Sıhhiye Square
- Born: Mustafa Nusret Suman; 21 March 1905; Veria, Sanjak of Salonica, Ottoman Empire
- Died: 15 August 1978 (aged 73); İzmit, Turkey
- Known for: Sculpture, painting

Nusret Suman (21 March 1905, Veria – 15 August 1978, İzmit) was a Turkish sculptor and painter.

He worked especially on portraits and monuments. His last work is the Hittite Sun Course Monument, which was the symbol of the city of Ankara in the past.

== Life ==
Suman was born in Veria close to Thessaloniki in 1905. His father, İsmail Hakkı Bey, was an officer in the Ottoman Army. His mother, Naciye Hanım, was the first Turkish photographer. After the Ottoman defeat in the First Balkan War his family relocated to Istanbul. His interest in the arts started with him watching his father make watercolor paintings.

In 1922, he entered the Sanayi Nefise Mektebi, and was educated in painting in the ateliers of Fikret Onat and İbrahim Çallı. In 1925 he moved on to İhsan Özsoys sculpture atelier. In 1929 he graduated from the mektebis sculpture faculty. In the exam that started right after his graduation he won the European learning award with his work: "Tayyareci Fethi ve Sadık Anıtı". This is how he became one of the Turkish Republics first students to be sent abroad to Europe with a scholarship. First going to Munich for painting and then followed by Paris for sculpture.

In 1934, he returned home; he joined the efforts in creating the Müstakil Ressamlar ve Heykeltıraşlar Birliği (Private Artists Union); In 1941 he joined the artists group known as the D Grubu (Group D). In 1943 he was appointed to the Güzel Sanatlar Akademisi (Fine Arts Academy) as teaching staff, and educated many students there. In the contest for sculptures and reliefs to be included in the Anıtkabir complex he won first place in the divisions for the "İnkılap Kulesi" (Revolutions Tower), "Barış Kulesi" (Peace Tower), "Müdafaa-i Hukuk Kulesi" (Defense of Law Tower), "Misak-ı Millî Kulesi" reliefs. In 1969 after receiving his professor title he retired. For three years he continued his art in the USA.

Suman, who in his life created monuments many of them honoring Atatürk, in 1978, for Ankaras Sıhhiye Square, made the Hittite Sun Course Monument. While going to check on his last work before the grand opening of the monument Suman was in a traffic accident which he did not survive.

== Notable works ==
- Tokat Atatürk Monument (1935)
- Muğla Atatürk Monument (1937)
- Mustafakemalpaşa Atatürk Monument (1939)
- Kırıkkale Atatürk Monument (1942)
- Orhan Veli bust (1958, Istanbul Painting and Sculpture Museum)
- Balıkesir Atatürk Monument (1959)
- Çorlu Atatürk Monument (1960)
- Karacabey Atatürk Monument (1961)
- Çarşamba Atatürk Monument (1961)
- Sivas Atatürk Monument (1964)
- Adapazarı Atatürk Monument (1964)
- Ankara Science Faculty Atatürk Monument (1964)
- Bingöl Atatürk Monument (1965)
- Sinop Atatürk Monument (1967)
- Gaziantep Atatürk Monument (1967)
- Ana (1970)
- Hipi Şair (1971)
- Hittite Sun Course Monument (1978)
- Namık Kemal Sculpture, Tekirdağ
- Galatasaray High School Fatih Sultan Mehmet bust
- Mimar Sinan Sculpture (Istanbul Painting and Sculpture Museum)
- Ankara Science Faculty, Athens, Switzerland and Belgium (1978)Henry Dunant busts

== See also ==
- Hittite Sun Course Monument
