= 1457 Ankara =

Stony asteroid from the central region of the asteroid belt

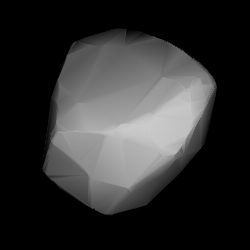
- Shape of Ankara modelled from its lightcurve

Discovery
- Discovered by: K. Reinmuth
- Discovery site: Heidelberg Obs.
- Discovery date: 3 August 1937

Designations
- Named after: Ankara (Turkish capital)
- Alternative designations: 1937 PA · 1933 SA; 1934 XG · 1936 FL_{1} 1943 YD · 1966 BG
- Minor planet category: main-belt · (middle)

Orbital characteristics
- Epoch 16 February 2017 (JD 2457800.5)
- Uncertainty parameter 0
- Observation arc: 82.95 yr (30,296 days)
- Aphelion: 3.1134 AU
- Perihelion: 2.2802 AU
- Semi-major axis: 2.6968 AU
- Eccentricity: 0.1545
- Orbital period (sidereal): 4.43 yr (1,618 days)
- Mean anomaly: 63.234°
- Mean motion: 0° 13^{m} 21.36^{s} / day
- Inclination: 6.0913°
- Longitude of ascending node: 296.31°
- Argument of perihelion: 296.31°

Physical characteristics
- Dimensions: 17.834±0.207 km 18.495±0.068 km 18.95±0.63 km 19.82±0.26 km 29.08 km (calculated)
- Synodic rotation period: 31.8±0.6 h
- Geometric albedo: 0.1 (assumed); 0.258±0.051; 0.262±0.008; 0.3038±0.0536; 0.320±0.037
- Spectral type: S
- Absolute magnitude (H): 10.60 · 10.70 · 10.8

1457 Ankara, provisional designation 1937 PA, is a stony asteroid from the central region of the asteroid belt, approximately 18 kilometers in diameter. It was discovered on 3 August 1937, by German astronomer Karl Reinmuth at Heidelberg Observatory in southwest Germany, and later named for the Turkish capital city of Ankara.

== Orbit and classification ==
Ankara orbits the Sun in the middle of the main belt at a distance of 2.3–3.1 AU once every 4 years and 5 months (1,618 days). Its orbit has an eccentricity of 0.15 and an inclination of 6° with respect to the ecliptic. It was first observed as 1933 SA at Uccle Observatory in 1933, extending the body's observation arc by four years prior to its official discovery observation at Heidelberg.

== Physical characteristics ==
=== Rotation period ===
A rotational lightcurve of Ankara was obtained from photometric observations by French amateur astronomer René Roy in September 2004. Lightcurve analysis gave a rotation period of 31.8 hours with a brightness variation of 0.21 magnitude (U=2). While not being a slow rotator, Ankara's spin rate is slower than that of most asteroids, which typically rotate within 20 hours once around their axis.

=== Diameter and albedo ===
According to the surveys carried out by the Japanese Akari satellite, and NASA's Wide-field Infrared Survey Explorer with its subsequent NEOWISE mission, Ankara measures between 17.834 and 19.82 kilometers in diameter and its surface has an albedo between 0.258 and 0.320.

The Collaborative Asteroid Lightcurve Link (CALL) assumes a lower albedo of 0.10—a compromise value that lies between the albedos for stony (0.20) and carbonaceous (0.057) asteroids, chosen by CALL for all non-family asteroids with a semi-major axis between 2.6 and 2.7 AU—and consequently calculates a larger diameter of 29.08 kilometers with an absolute magnitude of 10.8, as a body's diameter and albedo are inversely related to each other.

== Naming ==
This minor planet was named after the Turkish capital Ankara. The official naming citation was proposed by Wolfgang Gleißberg, a German solar astronomer, who immigrated to Turkey, after he was dismissed at the Breslau Observatory in Nazi Germany in 1933, because he had a Jewish grandfather. The citation was first mentioned in The Names of the Minor Planets by Paul Herget in 1955 (H 131).
