= Kurt Bittel =

German prehistorian

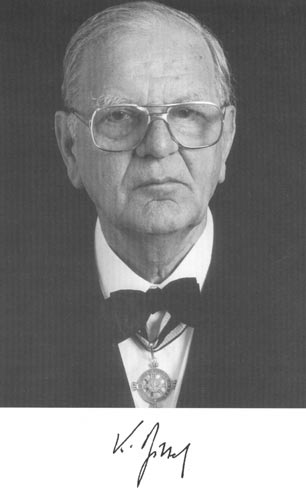
Kurt Bittel

Kurt Bittel (born 5 July 1907 in Heidenheim an der Brenz, died 30 January 1991 in Heidenheim an der Brenz) was a German prehistorian. As president of the German Archaeological Institute (Deutsches Archäologisches Institut - DAI) and excavator of the Hittite city of Hattusha in Turkey, as well as an expert on the Celts in Central Europe, he acquired great merit.

== Decorations and awards ==
State awards

- Great Cross of Merit of the Federal Republic of Germany (1955)
- Pour le Mérite for Sciences and Arts (Member, 1967; Chancellor of the Order 1971–1979; 3rd Vice-Chancellor from 1979 to 1980; 2nd Vice-Chancellor 1980–1984)
- Austrian Decoration for Science and Art (1978)
- Order of Merit of Baden-Württemberg (1982)
- Grand Cross of Merit with Star and Sash of Merit of the Federal Republic of Germany (1984)

Memberships

- Honorary member of the İstanbul Enstitüsü (1955), Turkish Historical Society (Türk Tarih Kurumu; Ankara, 1959), Royal Irish Academy (Dublin, 1965), Société de Yougoslavie Archéologique (Arheološko Društvo Jugoslavije, Belgrade, 1966), German-Turkish Association (Bonn, 1970), Society for Pre- and Early History in Württemberg and Hohenzollern (Gesellschaft für Archäologie in Württemberg und Hohenzollern) (1977), Honorary Member of the German Archaeological Institute (1982)
- Honorary Corresponding Member of The Prehistoric Society (Oxford, 1956)
- Honorary Fellow of the Society of Antiquaries of London (1965)
- Foreign Honorary Member of the Archaeological Institute of America (New York, 1967), American Academy of Arts and Sciences (Boston, Massachusetts, 1980), and the American Philosophical Society (Philadelphia, Pennsylvania, 1984).

Other

- Honorary Citizen of the city of Heidenheim (1967)
- Honorary doctorates from the University of Istanbul (1969), Anadolu University (Anadolu Üniversitesi) (Eskişehir, Turkey; 1990)
