= Mithatpaşa Avenue =

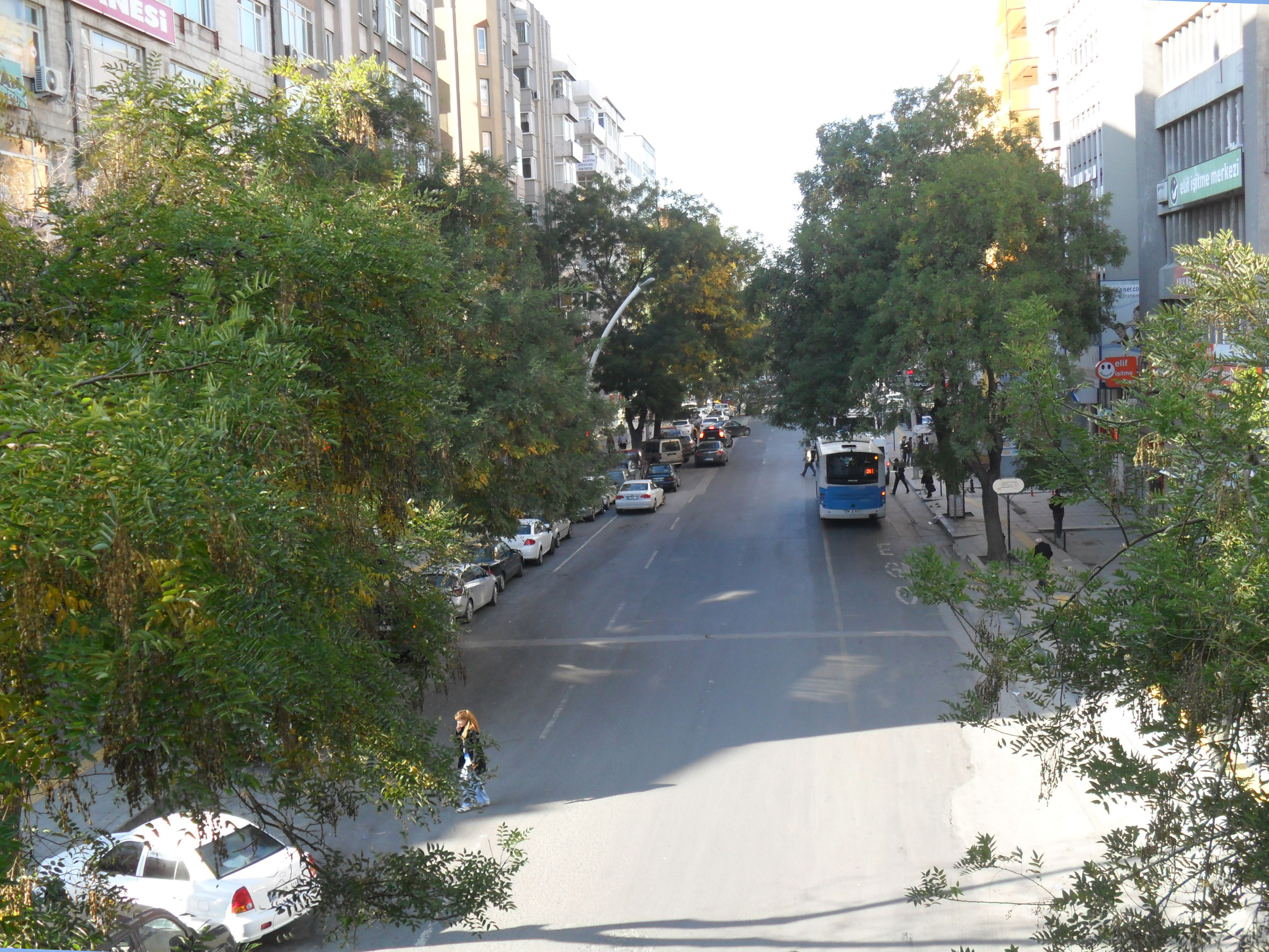
Mithatpaşa Avenue, Ankara, Turkey

Mithatpaşa Avenue is one of the important streets and business centers of Ankara, Turkey. It is named after Mithat Pasha who is known as one of the proponents of Ottoman Empire constitution in the second half of the 19th century.

== Geography ==
Mithatpaşa Avenue runs about 1,050 metres (3,440 ft) in southwest to northwest direction. Kocatepe Mosque is at the south east end and Sıhhiye Square is at the northwest end. The street is a gentle ramp where the southeast end is about 40 metres (130 ft) higher than the other end. Two other busy streets intersect with Mithatpaşa Avenue; Ziyagökalp Boulevard and Meşrutiyet Avenue.

== History ==
During the early years of the Republic, Ankara was a small city. Modern Ankara was developed after the city was proclaimed the capital. As a result of series of plans (like that of Lörcher in 1925s and that of Hermann Jansen in 1930s) new Ankara was developed. Mithatpaşa Avenue is a part of this development.

== Traffic ==
Mithatpaşa Avenue is a one way arterial road. The traffic flows to Sıhhiye Square. Public buses to the west of the city center follow the route from Meşrutiyet Avenue to Mithatpaşa Avenue and eventually they pass to the west side by an overpass in Sıhhiye Square.

== See also ==
- Mithat Pasha
