= Sıhhiye Square =

Square in Ankara, Turkey

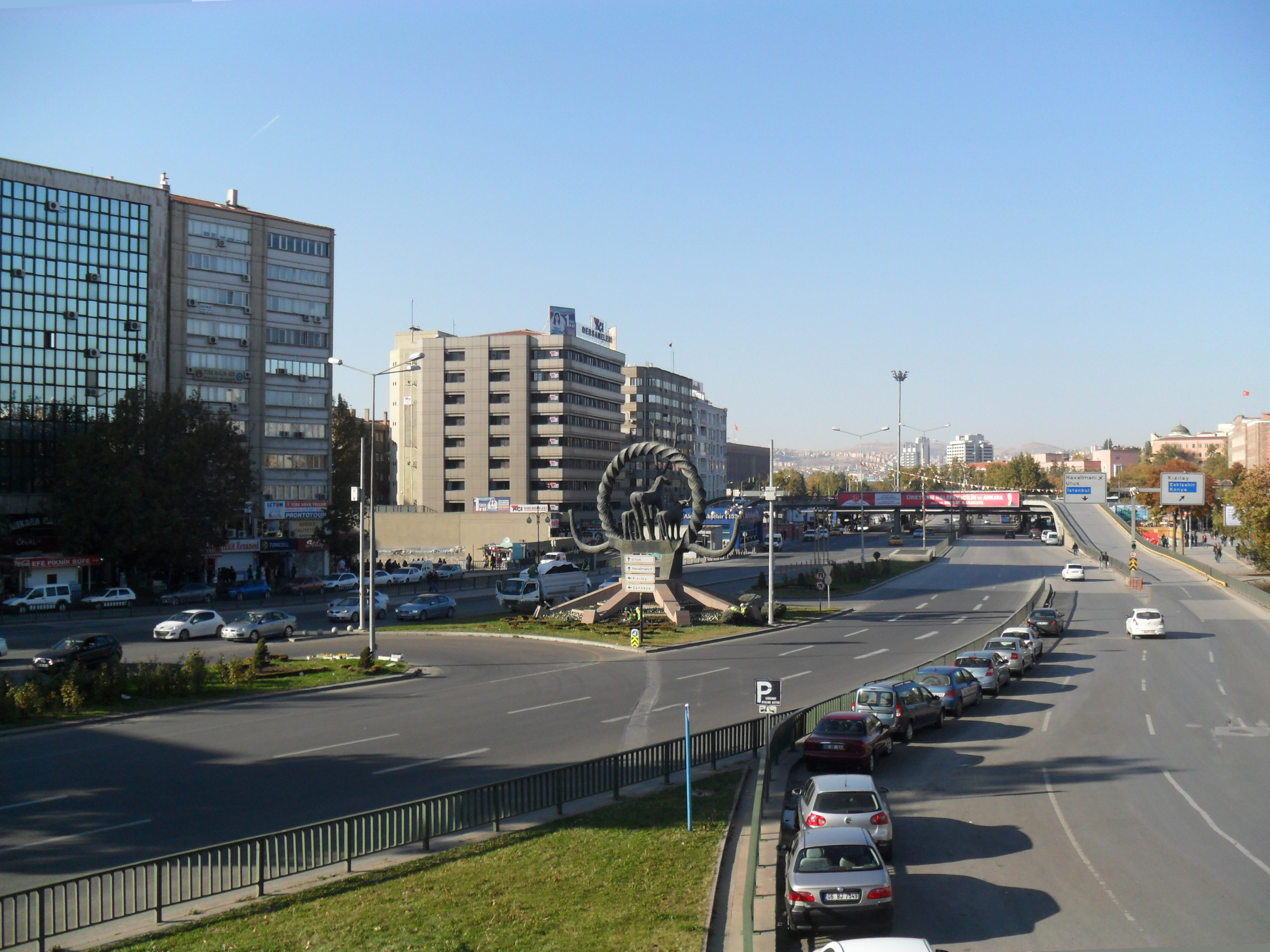
Sıhhiye Square in Ankara, Turkey seen from Southeast

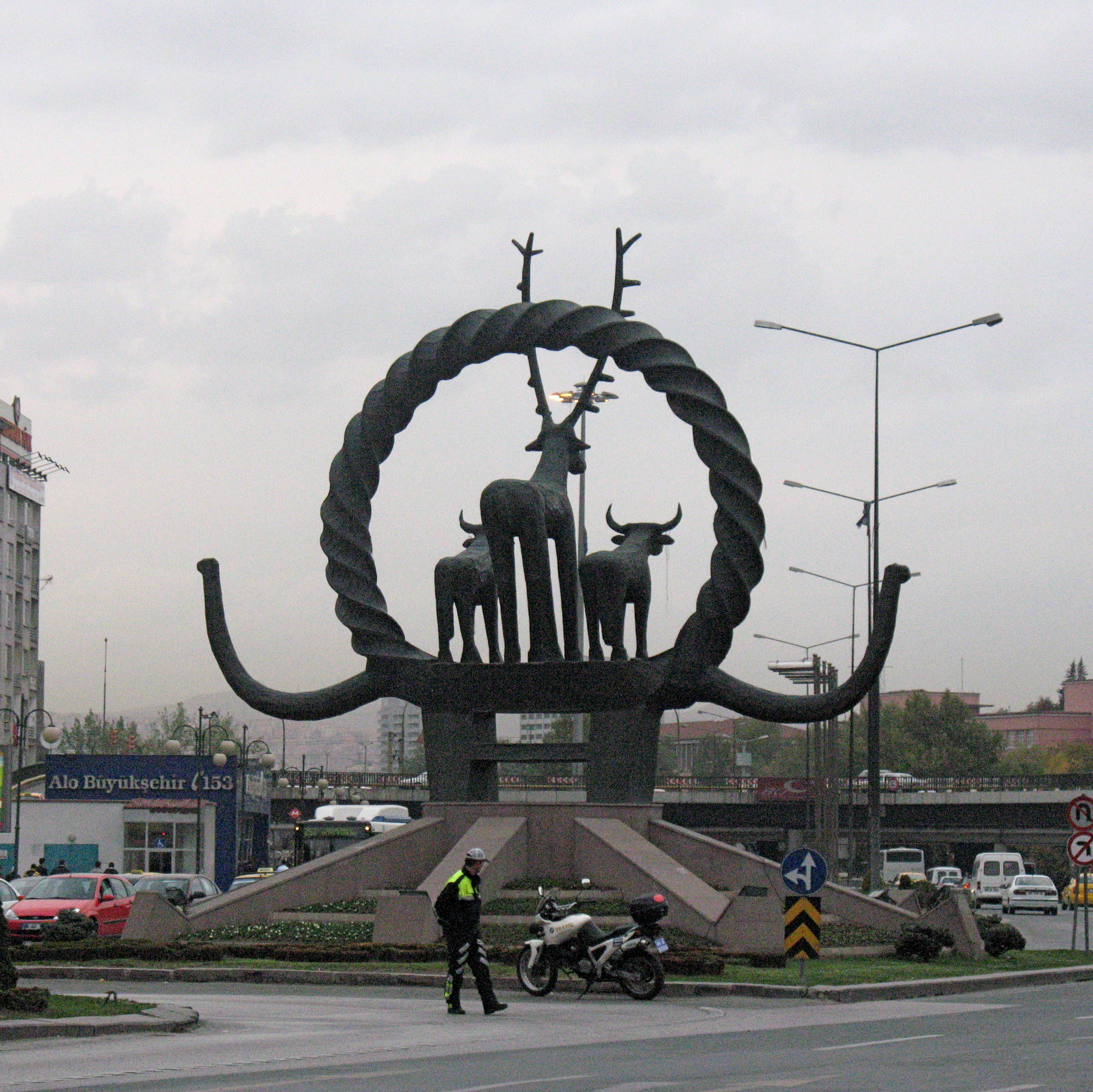
Hattian sculpture

Sıhhiye Square (Turkish: Sıhhiye Meydanı) is a square in Ankara, Turkey. "Sıhhiye" is a Turkish word for "Health". Because the former main building of the Ministry of Health was facing Sıhhiye Square from the east. Formerly, it was also called "Lausanne Square" (Turkish: Lozan Meydanı) referring to the city Lausanne in Switzerland where the Conference of Lausanne was held in 1922–1923.

== Geography ==
The square is an intersection of various streets at about 39°55′40″N 32°51′18″E. Its longer dimension is on the 300 metres (980 ft)-broden section of Atatürk Boulevard running from north to south. Mithatpaşa Avenue from the southeast and Necatibey Avenue from the southwest as well as various lesser streets from both sides intersect in the square. The connection between Mithatpaşa and Necatibey avenues is via an overpass. There are also two other overpasses. One is the Celalbayar Boulevard from west to east which has no exit to Sıhhiye Square and the other one is the railway bridge from the Ankara Station in the west to the east. Sıhhiye is also a stop in Ankara Metro.

== History ==
Before Republican times center of the city was to the north and in place of the square there was a creek. After the Turkish Republic was proclaimed, Ankara was redesigned by a group of urban planners including Hermann Jansen. Sıhhiye Square is developed after this planning.

== Hattian sculpture ==
A massive replica of one of the Hattian Alaca Höyük bronze standards created by Turkish sculptor Nusret Suman (1905–1978) was erected in the middle of Sıhhiye Square in 1978. The ancient Hattian cities were near Ankara and some of the most important Hattian, including the one that the sculpture is based on, are now displayed in Museum of Anatolian Civilizations.
