= Treaty of Ankara =

Treaty of Ankara may refer to:

- Treaty of Ankara (1921)
- Treaty of Ankara (1926), also known as the Frontier Treaty of 1926
- Treaty of Ankara (1963), also known as the Ankara Agreement

== See also ==
- Ankara Agreement, 1963
