= Angar-e Chaleh =

Angar-e Chaleh انگرچاله
- Village
- Location within Iran
- Coordinates: 28°33′46″N 56°59′13″E
- Country: Iran
- Province: Kerman
- County: Jiroft
- Bakhsh: Central
- Rural District: Esfandaqeh

Population (2006)
  - Total: 97
- Time zone: UTC+3:30 (IRST)
  - Summer (DST): UTC+4:30 (IRDT)

Angar-e Chaleh (Persian: انگرچاله; also known as Angar) is a village in Esfandaqeh Rural District, in the Central District of Jiroft County, Kerman Province, Iran. At the 2006 census, its population was 97, in 21 families.
