= Hittite Sun Course Monument =

Memorial in Sıhhiye Square, Ankara, Turkey

Hittite Sun Disc Monument
- Hitit Güneş Kursu Antı
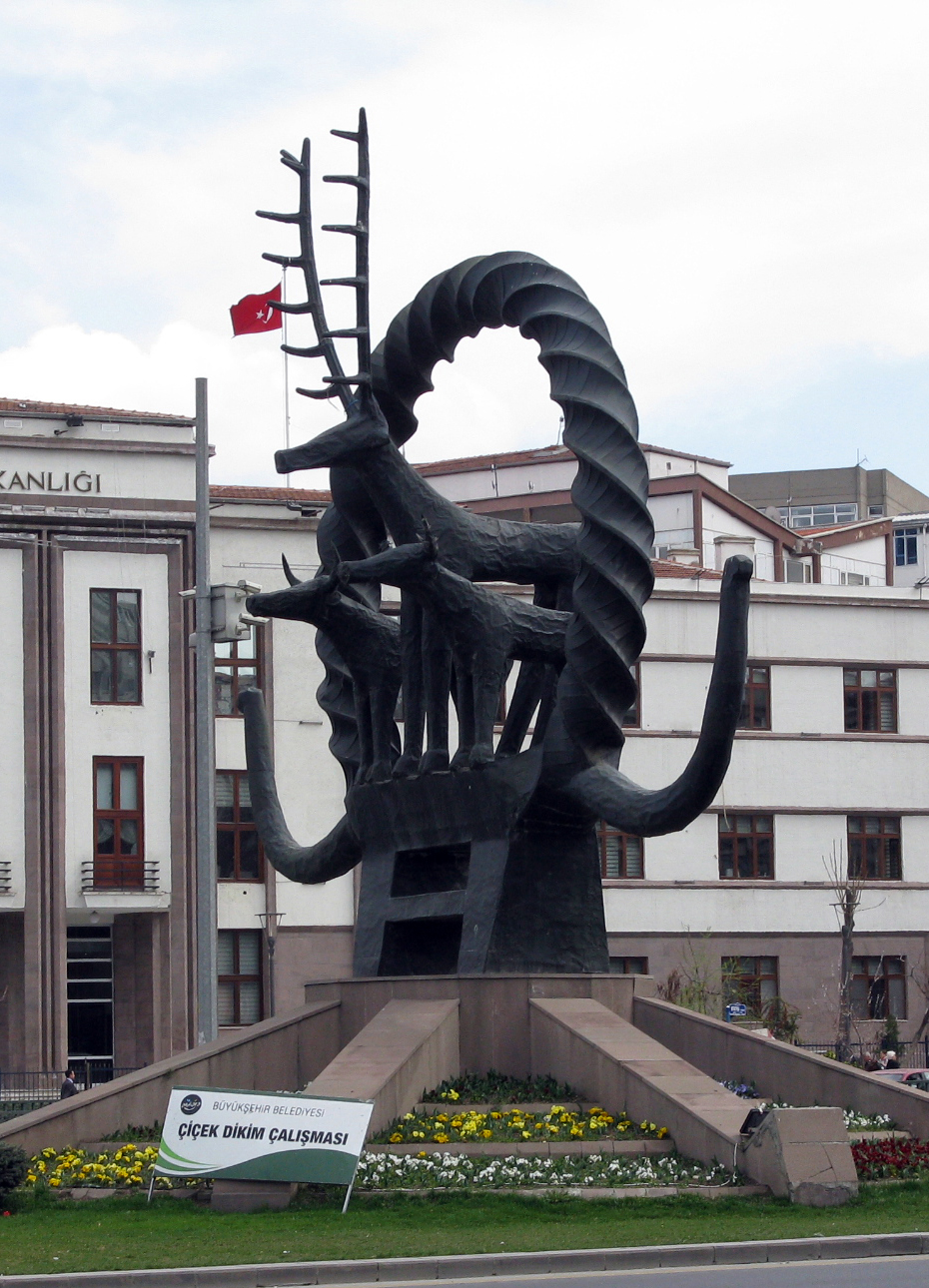
- Hittite Sun Disc Monument
- Interactive map of Hittite Sun Disc Monument
- Location: Ankara, Turkey
- Coordinates: 39.9255°N 32.8541°E
- Designer: Nusret Suman (architect)
- Material: Bronze
- Height: 4 m (13 ft)
- Opening date: 1978
- Restored date: 2001
- Dedicated to: Hittites

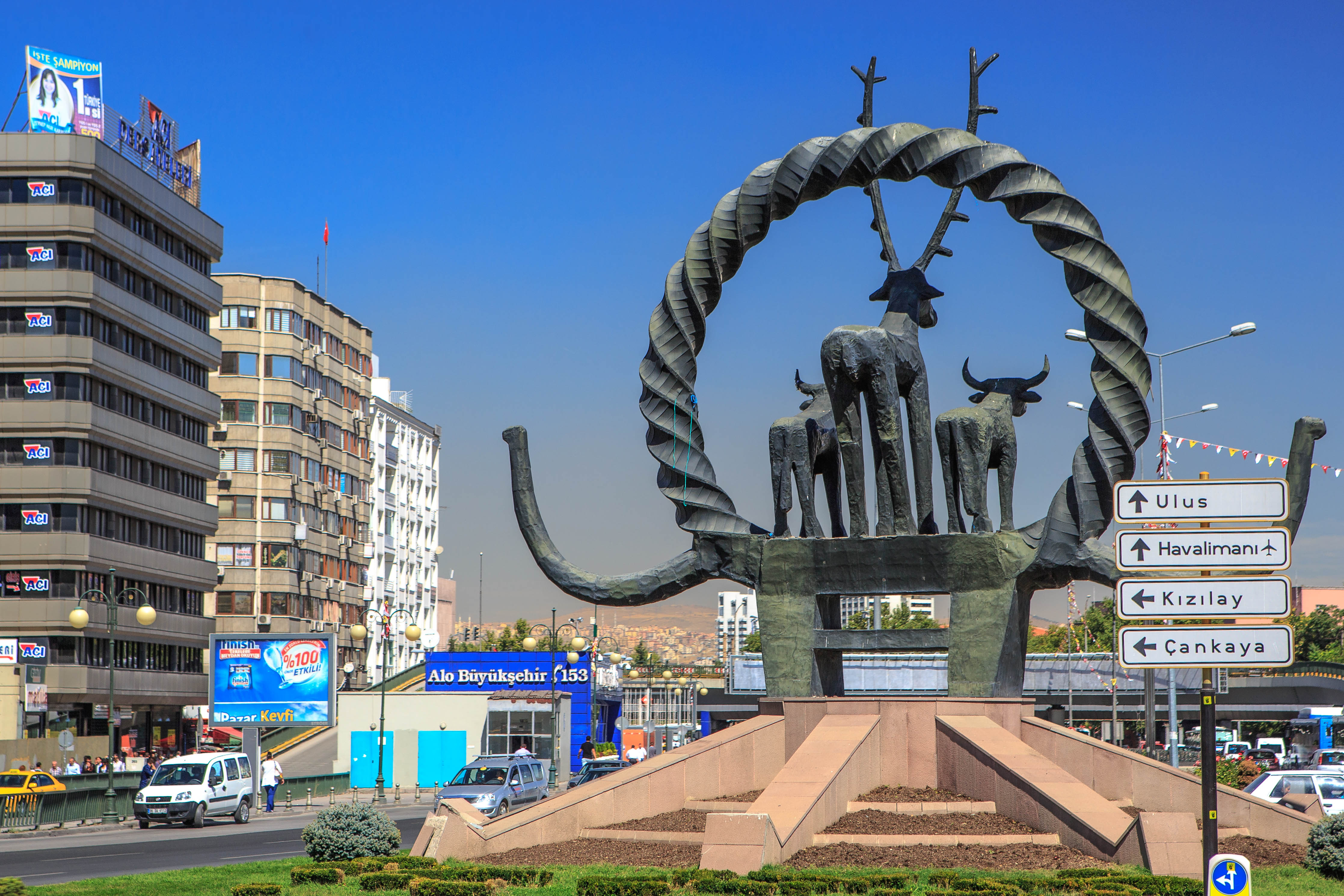
Hittite Sun Disc Monument and Sıhhiye Square

The Hittite Sun Disc Monument (Turkish: Hitit Güneş Kursu Anıtı) is a memorial dedicated to Hittites created by sculptor Nusret Suman and placed in Sıhhiye Square, Ankara, Turkey, in 1978.

== History ==
It is a replica of a Hatti monument unearthed in excavations at Alacahöyük. In 1973, the symbol of the city was made by Mayor Vedat Dalokay. Examples of the Hittite Sun Disc from the tombs of the Hatti kings can be seen in the Museum of Anatolian Civilizations. The Hittite Sun Disc Monument was presented to the people of Ankara by the Anatolian Insurance Co. in 1977. The symbol of Ankara University is the Sun Disc. This symbol is commonly regarded as belonging to the Hittite civilization and usually connotes Ankara and Anatolia.

Hittite Sun Disc: Between 1977–1995, about 18 years is used as the symbol of Ankara Municipality. However, on June 29, 1995, this logo was amended as required by the decision of the Metropolitan Municipal Assembly of Ankara.
