= Angaria, Patuakhali =

- Location in Bangladesh
- Coordinates: 22°29′N 90°22′E
- Country: Bangladesh
- Division: Barisal Division
- District: Patuakhali District
- Time zone: UTC+6 (Bangladesh Time)

Angaria, Patuakhali is a village in Dumki Upazila of Patuakhali District in the Barisal Division of southern-central Bangladesh.
