= Sullia taluk =

Sullia taluk is a taluk of the Dakshina Kannada district of the Indian state of Karnataka. The headquarters is the town of Sullia. In 2012, the government of Karnataka has planned to set up a rubber factory in Sullia taluk.

== Village ==
1. Aletty.
2. Ajjavara
3. Aranthodu.
