= Bakila Hukrappa =

Indian politician

Bakila Hukrappa is a former Member of Legislative Assembly for Karnataka state, representing Sullia constituency for 19 months during 1983–84 and is known for his simple life.

== Background ==
Bakila Hukrappa studied up to PUC (class 12) and was a sportsman during student days. He contested State Assembly in 1978 but lost. Bakila Hukrappa won 1983 election from Sullia constituency by defeating N. Sheena and became Member of Legislative Assembly for Karnataka State but got defeated during 1985 elections from the same constituency. Sullia is a reserved constituency for Scheduled Caste candidates and Balappa Hukrappa was a labourer in Areca garden when he was selected as a candidate by Bharathiya Janatha Party for 1983 elections. He is from humble origin and even after several years of political career, his declared assets during 2008 were 2.53 acre land in Nalkur village, Rs.250 cash in his Savings Bank account and Rs.4000 worth earrings worn by his wife Chaniyaru. He was MLA for 18 months during 1983–84 and was a contributing factor in the development of his constituency.

== Politician turns Agricultural laborer ==
Bakila Hukrappa could not get elected as MLA during succeeding elections and he contested other elections like Zilla Panchayath wherein also he got defeated and as of 2010, he was working as a labourer in Rubber Plantations for his livelihood. He contested village level gram panchayath elections and got elected two times. His efforts to earn livelihood as agricultural labour have been appreciated and seen as his sincere contribution to his constituency. As of 2010, he did not own a house, lived in his father-in-law's house and his main source of income was pension by Government. After living in this for 21 years, he constructed a small house during 2016 and continued to work as daily wager.
