= S. Angara =

Indian politician

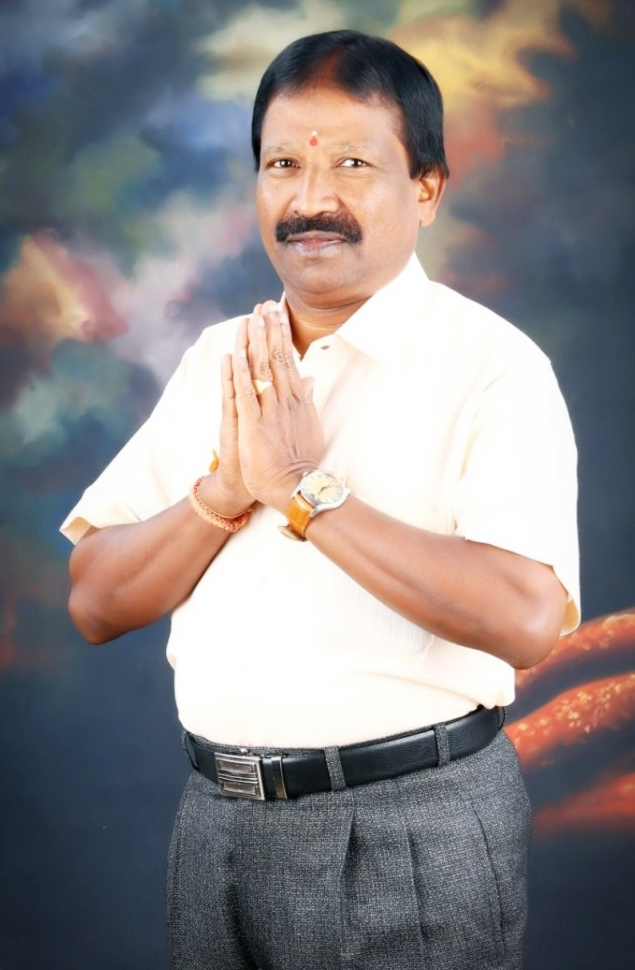

Minister of Ports & Inland Transport Government of Karnataka
- In office 21 January 2021 – 13 May 2023
- Chief Minister: B. S. Yediyurappa; Basavaraj Bommai
- Preceded by: Kota Srinivas Poojary

Minister of Fisheries Government of Karnataka
- In office 21 January 2021 – 13 May 2023
- Chief Minister: B. S. Yediyurappa; Basavaraj Bommai
- Preceded by: Kota Srinivas Poojary

Member of Karnataka Legislative Assembly
- In office 1994–2023
- Preceded by: K. Kushala
- Constituency: Sullia

Personal details
- Born: 1 July 1964 (age 62) Amaramudnooru
- Party: Bharatiya Janata Party
- Occupation: Politician

Sullia Angara is an Indian politician who is the Ex Minister of state for Fisheries, Ports and Inland Transport Department of Karnataka from January 2021. He is a six term member of the Karnataka Legislative Assembly from Sullia Assembly constituency from the Bharatiya Janata Party.

== Early life ==
Angara was born in Dasanakaje House, Amaramudnoor Village, Sullia Taluk. His early education was completed in Chokkadi High School.

== Political career ==
He represented the Sullia constituency from 1994 to 2023. He was made a minister of fisheries and ports in 2021. He threatened to resign from politics after denial of ticket from the BJP, but soon professed to work for the party candidate.
