= Angaaray (1998 film) =

1998 film by Mahesh Bhatt

- Theatrical release poster
- Directed by: Mahesh Bhatt
- Written by: Robin Bhatt; Javed Siddiqui; Akash Khurana
- Produced by: Goldie Behl; Madhu Ramesh Behl; Shrishti Behl
- Starring: Akshay Kumar; Nagarjuna; Pooja Bhatt; Sonali Bendre; Gulshan Grover; Paresh Rawal
- Cinematography: Sameer Arya
- Edited by: Sanjay Sankla
- Music by: Anu Malik; Aadesh Shrivastava
- Production company: Rose Movies Combines
- Release date: 24 July 1998
- Running time: 140 minutes
- Country: India
- Language: Hindi
- Budget: ₹3.50 crore
- Box office: ₹4.82 crore (India Gross)

Angaaray is a 1998 Indian Hindi-language action film produced by Madhu Ramesh Behl on Rose Movies Combines banner, directed by Mahesh Bhatt. It stars Akshay Kumar, Nagarjuna, Pooja Bhatt, Sonali Bendre and music is composed by Anu Malik and Aadesh Shrivastava. It is inspired by the American film State of Grace. Mahesh Bhatt again used the same theme in his 2003 film Footpath. The film was dubbed and released in Telugu as Rowdy in 2003.

== Plot ==
Bangalore-based police inspector Amar Mehra is approached by Mumbai's police commissioner, Vinod Talwar, and is assigned the task to go undercover and locate and kill the killer(s) of a businessman, Khanna. Amar soon finds out that the culprit is his childhood friend, Raja Lokhande He is also called King Nag. Amar's other childhood friends, Jaggu Lokhande and Surya, are also working for Lala Roshan Lal, a major ganglord. He joins their gang as well using their friendship.

Meanwhile, Amar rekindles an old flame with his childhood sweetheart, Pooja, who is Surya's sister. Pooja has distanced herself from her brother and friends as she wants to lead an honest life. Amar tells her that they can be reformed. Meanwhile, Lala starts to suspect Amar to be a mole in the gang after an encounter goes wrong. Jaggu confronts Amar, who denies it, supported by Raja. Jaggu then tells him to kill a police inspector to prove himself. Amar agrees and Pooja, in anger, distances herself from him as well. Amar shoots the police inspector in front of the gang and has proved his worth.

However, it is later revealed that the shootout was a hoax. Vinod confronts Amar telling him that he is not killing Raja and others because they are his childhood friends. Amar still insists that he can reform them and that Lala is the only actual culprit. Meanwhile, Surya tries to make up with Pooja and asks for her to tie rakhi on his wrist. At the same time, Lala's brother enters lusting after her. This anger Surya who beats him very hard. Lala hides at home, but when Amar and Raja go out to look out for the police, Jaggu calls him outside. It turns out that Jaggu betrayed Surya and gets him killed.

Raja is now hungry for Lala's brother's blood and kills him. Amar reveals to Pooja that he is an undercover cop. Amar finds out that Raja has killed Lala and confronts him. However, the police force enters at the exact moment to shoot Raja while Roma, Raja's girlfriend, faints. Amar reveals that he is a cop and begs to take Roma to the hospital while Raja runs away. Very angry, Raja confronts Amar and is about to kill him. Amar manages to calm him down, and Raja agrees to surrender after Roma is found pregnant. Jaggu meanwhile receives news from Lala that he can hide Raja but should bring Amar to him. Jaggu goes to their place and gives Raja tickets to escape Mumbai, but he insists on surrendering. Jaggu angrily tells him that police can't be trusted, but Amar then reveals that he knew Jaggu was the one who got Surya killed. Jaggu realises what grave mistakes he has done and agrees to surrender as well. However, Lala's men start to attack their place with fire bombs, so Amar and Raja go out to finish them. Raja gets shot in the knee and tells Amar to catch Lala at any cost. Amar chases Lala and finally catches him. He then kills Lala at the spot, and Vinod and the police arrive.

In the end, it is revealed that Raja and Jaggu will face 10 and 7 years of jail, respectively, after they agreed to be police, informants. Meanwhile, Amar is taken to police custody for questioning.

== Cast ==
- Akshay Kumar as Inspector Amar Mehra (Amar)
  - Kunal Khemu as Young Amar
- Nagarjuna as Raj Lokhande (Raj)
  - Master Shourya Mehta as Young Raja
- Pooja Bhatt as Pooja
  - Baby Gazala as Young Pooja
- Sonali Bendre as Roma
- Gulshan Grover as Lala Roshanlal
- Paresh Rawal as Jaggu Lokhande
  - Master Girish Prakash as Young Jaggu
- Kulbhushan Kharbanda as Khanna
- Irfan Kamal as Surya
  - Master Bunty as Young Surya
- Mohan Kapoor as Lala Roshanlal's brother (Mitthu)
- Naresh Suri as Police Commissioner Vinod Talwar
- Razak Khan as Jaggu's friend
- Anant Jog as Police Inspector Anant Mehta

== Soundtrack ==
Angaaray

Soundtrack album by Anu Malik Aadesh Shrivastava Raju Singh Sukhwinder Singh
- Released: 22 June 1998
- Genre: Feature film soundtrack
- Length: 41:31
- Label: T-Series

The music was composed by Anu Malik and Aadesh Shrivastava. Lyrics were written by Javed Akhtar. The music was released by T-Series Audio Company.

No.	Title	Lyrics	Music	Singer(s)	Length
1.	"Tanha Tanha"	Javed Akhtar	Aadesh Shrivastava	Alka Yagnik, Abhijeet Bhattacharya	6:10
2.	"Aande Aande"	Javed Akhtar	Aadesh Shrivastava	Udit Narayan, Amit Kumar, Alka Yagnik, Aadesh Shrivastav	6:00
3.	"Yaaden Kitni Yaaden"	Javed Akhtar	Anu Malik	Alka Yagnik, Udit Narayan	7:28
4.	"Hai Koi Meharban"	Javed Akhtar	Aadesh Shrivastava	Alka Yagnik, Abhijeet Bhattacharya	5:35
5.	"Le Chalo Tum Jahan"	Madanpal	Sukhwinder Singh	Hariharan, Anuradha Paudwal	4:53
6.	"Rangila"	Javed Akhtar	Anu Malik	Anu Malik, Suneeta Rao	6:49
7.	"Tum Hi Mere Humnashin"	Rani Malik	Raju Singh	Hariharan, Kavita Paudwal	7:05
8.	"Yaaden Kitni Yaaden"	Javed Akhtar	Anu Malik	Alka Yagnik	7:30
Total length:					41:31
