= Sullia =

- Town
- Sullia Scene
- Nickname: Sulya
- Location in Karnataka, India Sullia (India)
- Coordinates: 12°33′29″N 75°23′21″E
- Country: India
- State: Karnataka
- District: Dakshina Kannada
- Region: Tulu Nadu

Government
  - Body: Town Panchayath
  - MLA: Bhageerathi Murulya

Area
  - Town: 17.13 km^{2} (6.61 sq mi)
  - Rural: 809.43 km^{2} (312.52 sq mi)
- Elevation: 108 m (354 ft)

Population (2011)
  - Town: 19,958
  - Density: 1,165/km^{2} (3,018/sq mi)
  - Rural: 125,269
- Time zone: UTC+5:30 (IST)
- PIN: 574239
- Telephone code: +91 8257
- Vehicle registration: KA-21
- Website: http://www.sulliatown.mrc.gov.in/

Sullia (also known as Sulya, IPA: [suɭjɐ]) is a town in the Dakshina Kannada district of the state of Karnataka, India. It is the headquarters of the Sullia taluk. Sullia is located 300 kilometres west of the state capital Bengaluru.

== History ==
A historical revolution took place during 1837, when a majority of the Gowdas, Bunts, Kudiyas, Adidravidas and other castes from Amara Sullia, Madikeri, Siddapura, Bhagamandala, Shanivarasanthe, Bellare, Puttur and Nandavara went and fought for freedom against the British.

== Members of the Legislative Assembly ==
Election	Member	Party
1962	S. Subbayya Naik	Indian National Congress
1967	A. Ramachandra	Swatantra Party
1972	P. D. Bangera	Indian National Congress
1978	A. Ramachandra	Janata Party
1983	Bakila Hukrappa	Bharatiya Janata Party
1985	K. Kushala	Indian National Congress
1989	K. Kushala	Indian National Congress
1994	S. Angara	Bharatiya Janata Party
1999	S. Angara	Bharatiya Janata Party
2004	S. Angara	Bharatiya Janata Party
2008	S. Angara	Bharatiya Janata Party
2013	S. Angara	Bharatiya Janata Party
2018	S. Angara	Bharatiya Janata Party
2023	Bhageerathi Murulya	Bharatiya Janata Party

== Demographics ==
According to the 2011 census report, Hindus form the largest religious group in Sullia taluk (1,23,507 that is 85.04% of the Taluk population). The number of Muslims is 19,556 (13.47% of the Taluk population) and the number of Christians in the Taluk is 2,076 (1.43%).

== Religions in Sullia taluk ==
Religions in Sullia taluk

source: Sullia Taluk Census 2011 data
1. Hindus (90.0%)
2. Muslim (8.51%)
3. Christians (1.43%)
4. Other (0.06%)

== Languages in Sullia Taluk ==
Languages in Sullia taluk
Language	Speakers
Tulu	40.9%
Kannada	19.2%
Malayalam	18.8%
Are Bhashe (Kannada)	13.3%
Others	7.8%
Distribution of languages Source: 2011 Census of India

== Climate ==
Climate data for Sullia, India
Month	Jan	Feb	Mar	Apr	May	Jun	Jul	Aug	Sep	Oct	Nov	Dec	Year
Record high °F	84	—	—	—	109	—	—	—	—	86	95	—	109
Mean maximum °F	—	—	—	111	—	—	—	—	—	—	—	—	111
Mean daily maximum °F	—	—	—	—	—	—	77	—	90	—	—	—	—
Mean daily minimum °F	—	—	—	—	—	—	64	—	66	—	—	—	—
Mean minimum °F	—	—	—	102	—	—	—	—	—	—	—	—	102
Record low °F	59	—	—	—	90	—	—	—	—	64	64	—	59
Record high °C	29	—	—	—	43	—	—	—	—	30	35	—	43
Mean daily maximum °C	—	—	—	—	—	—	25	—	32	—	—	—	—
Mean daily minimum °C	—	—	—	—	—	—	18	—	19	—	—	—	—
Record low °C	15	—	—	—	32	—	—	—	—	18	18	—	15
Source 1:
Source 2:

== Connectivity ==
=== Air ===
The nearest airport to Sullia is Mangalore International Airport which is at a distance of 88 km. Flights are available to major Indian cities like Delhi, Bangalore, Hyderabad, Chennai, Mumbai and Middle East countries like Abu Dhabi, Bahrain, Dammam, Doha, Dubai–International, Kuwait, Muscat.

=== Railway ===
The closest railway station to the town is Subrahmanya Road Railway Station (Station Code:SBHR), which is around 48 km via the fastest road.

== See also ==
- Jalsoor
- Ajjavara, Sulya
- Aletty
