= Baldwin =

Baldwin may refer to:

== People ==
- Baldwin (name), including a list of people and fictional characters with the surname

== Places ==
=== Canada ===
- Baldwin, York Regional Municipality, Ontario
- Baldwin, Ontario, in Sudbury District
- Baldwin's Mills, Quebec

=== United States ===
- Baldwin County, Alabama
- Mount Baldwin (California)
- Baldwin, Florida
- Baldwin, Georgia
- Baldwin County, Georgia
- Baldwin, Illinois
- Baldwin, Iowa
- Baldwin City, Kansas
- Baldwin, Louisiana
- Baldwin, Maine
- Baldwin, Maryland
- Baldwin, Cambridge, Massachusetts
- Baldwin, Michigan
- Baldwyn, Mississippi
- Baldwin (town), New York, in Chemung County
- Baldwin (hamlet), New York, in Nassau County
  - Baldwin station
- Baldwin, North Dakota
- Baldwin, Pennsylvania
- Baldwin, Wisconsin
- Baldwin (town), Wisconsin

=== Other places ===
- Baldwin Street, in Dunedin, New Zealand, the world's steepest street
- Baldwin Hills, neighborhood in Los Angeles, California
- Montgomery, Powys, named in Welsh "Trefaldwyn", meaning "The Town of Baldwin"

== Businesses and organisations ==
=== Companies ===
- Baldwin Locomotive Works, one of the world's largest builders of steam locomotives in the 19th and 20th centuries
- Baldwin Piano Company, once the largest manufacturer of pianos and keyboard instruments in the US

=== Schools ===
- Baldwin Boys' High School, Bangalore, India
- Baldwin Girls' High School, Bangalore, India
- The Baldwin School, in Bryn Mawr, Pennsylvania, U.S.

== Other uses ==
- Baldwin (apple)
- The Baldwin Brothers, a Chicago-based electronica band
- Baldwin the Eagle, official mascot of Boston College
- Baldwin's Tower in Tsarevets, Veliko Tarnovo, Bulgaria
- Baldwin's rules, guidelines about the formation ring closure reactions
- Baldwin effect, a process by which environmental adaptation becomes a genetic one
- Baldwin guinea pig, a hairless breed similar to a Skinny pig

== See also ==
- Baldwin River (disambiguation)
- Justice Baldwin (disambiguation)
- King Baldwin (disambiguation)
- Alexander & Baldwin, an American company
- University of Balamand, Lebanon
