= ACBA =

ACBA may refer to:

- Academy of Comic Book Arts, an American professional organization
- Aéro Club du Bas Armagnac, a large French aero club
- American Cavy Breeders Association
- American College of the Building Arts in Charleston, South Carolina
