= Skinny pig =

Guinea pig breed

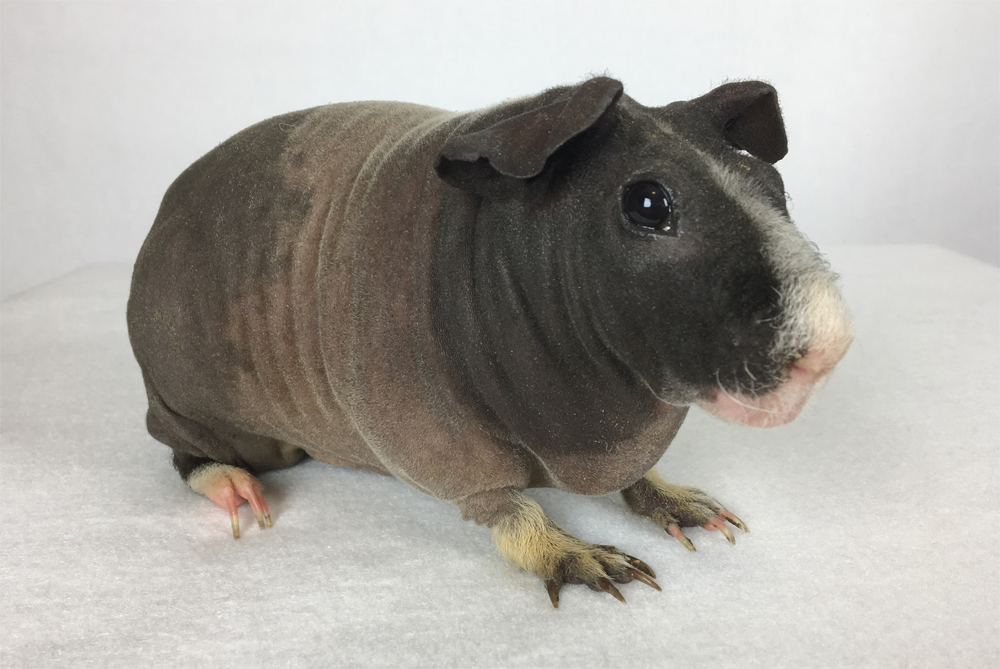
- Adult female Skinny Pig
- Conservation status: Domesticated
- Nicknames: Cavy
- Country of origin: Canada

Traits
- Coat: Hairless
- Lifespan: 5–7 years
- Fur type: Mostly hairless

The Skinny Pig or Skinny is an almost hairless strain of guinea pig. Skinny pigs typically have hair on their muzzles, feet, and legs, but are hairless over the remainder of their bodies. Some of them have a thin covering of fuzzy hair on their backs as well. The Skinny guinea pig is not one of the 13 recognized cavy breeds by the American Cavy Breeders Association. A healthy skinny has skin that is mostly smooth, with some wrinkling around the legs and neck. The body is full with no appearance of spine or ribs. Skinnies can come in a variety of skin colors and patterns, including "Dutch", "Brindle", and "Himalayan". The term skinny is used for hairless guinea pigs either because it colloquially refers to the exposed skin of the animal, or because it describes their thinner appearance due to their lack of hair.

== Unique traits ==
The modern strain of skinny guinea pig originated from a cross between haired guinea pigs and a hairless lab strain. The hairless strain that it is most likely related to was a spontaneous genetic mutation that was first identified at Montreal's Armand Frappier Institute in 1978, in a colony of Hartley lab guinea pigs. In 1982 they were sent to Charles River Laboratories to be bred for laboratory use and are commonly used in dermatology studies today. They are an outbred strain that has an intact thymus and standard immune system.

Hairless skinny guinea pigs are not significantly different physiologically from regular haired guinea pigs, although they need to eat more to maintain body heat. The optimal temperature range for a hairless guinea pig is 68 to 79 °F (20 to 26 °C), which is slightly higher than the optimal temperature range for the haired guinea pig.

Their sensitive skin has very much the same appearance as human skin, but has the same needs as normal guinea pig skin. Exposed skin is vulnerable to sunburn, other injuries and fungal infections unless precautions are taken. Skinny guinea pigs have also been found to have an increased risk of some eye diseases when compared to haired guinea pigs. Skinny guinea pigs should be housed indoors, and they are usually kept with nesting materials such as a blanket or cloth bag for heat conservation. The breeding protocol for skinny guinea pigs requires outcrossing to haired carriers at least every other generation. This is an important step in the breeding process, which makes them a poor choice for novice breeders. Skinny guinea pigs are born nearly hairless and must maintain the same level of hair through their life.

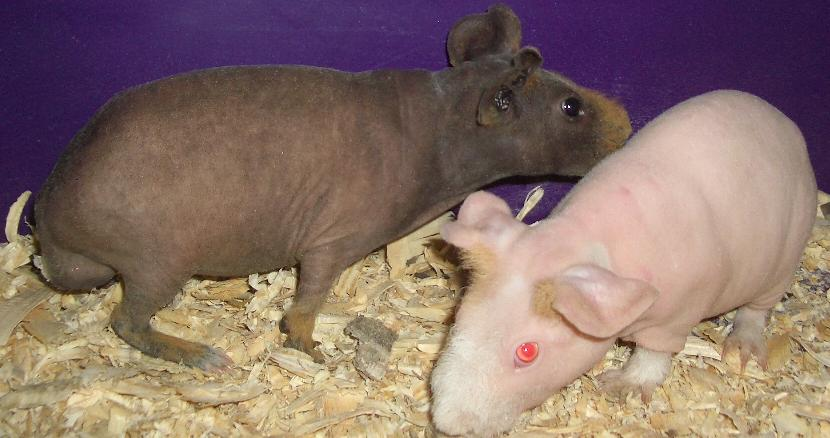
A pair of Hairless Guinea Pigs

"Werewolf" is a slang term for skinny pigs with more hair than usual, extending up over the face and onto the neck and shoulders. Extremely hairy werewolf skinny pigs will have hair all the way down to their rump. Werewolves typically gain and lose fur based on hormone levels, especially hormones related to pregnancy.

The gene causing hairlessness in skinny guinea pigs is a recessive gene, and breeding two skinny guinea pigs together will always result in all offspring being skinny pigs. Breeding a skinny guinea pig to a standard haired guinea pig will result in offspring that all carry one copy of the gene, but none will express hairlessness. These offspring are generally called skinny carriers. Breeding two skinny carriers together will result in averages of 25% of offspring being skinny guinea pigs, 50% of offspring being skinny carriers and 25% of offspring being regular haired guinea pigs that do not carry the gene. Since the chance of getting a skinny guinea pig is low, and because it is not possible to visually tell the difference between a haired guinea pig that does carry the gene and one that does not, this method of breeding is not recommended.

Haired skinny carriers remain haired their entire life and look like a normal guinea pig despite carrying the hairless gene.

There is a second type of hairless guinea pig called the Baldwin guinea pig; however, its hairlessness is the result of a completely different recessive gene. Breeding a skinny guinea pig with a Baldwin guinea pig will result in offspring that all are haired and carry one copy of the gene for skinny guinea pig hairlessness and one copy of the gene for Baldwin hairlessness.

Even though the skinny is a relatively new breed among pet owners and cavy fanciers, it is gaining popularity in Canada, Europe, Scandinavia, and Russia as well as in the United States where it was introduced into the pet trade in the mid-to-late 1990s.

== See also ==
- Nude mouse
- Naked mole rat
- List of guinea pig breeds
- Baldwin guinea pig
