= List of guinea pig breeds =

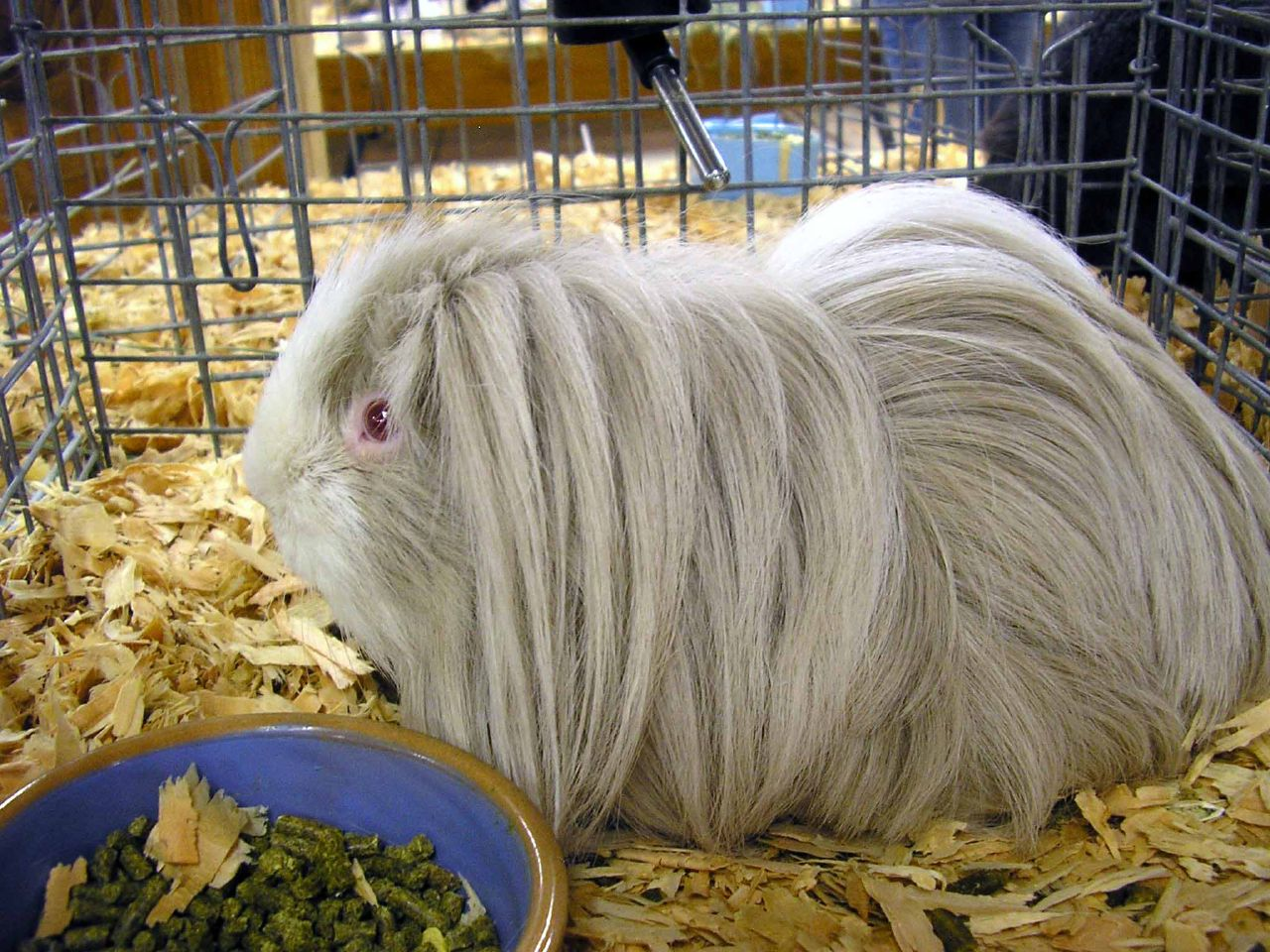
A Sheltie guinea pig with lilac and white colouring

Guinea pigs (Cavia porcellus), also known as cavies, have been domesticated since c. 5000 BCE. Selective breeding has produced a wide range of domestic guinea pig breeds, distinguished mainly by coat length, texture, colour, pattern, and body type.

Modern guinea pig breeds are used primarily as companion animals and exhibition animals. Some strains have also been developed for use as laboratory animals and model organisms in biomedical research.

As with most domesticated animals, guinea pig breeds exhibit a wide range of physical characteristics and serve various purposes. Some are show breeds, notable for their long, flowing hair, while others are laboratory breeds, used as model organisms in scientific research.

== History and organizations ==
As early as the 500s CE, Indigenous peoples in South America selectively bred guinea pigs, known in the Andes as cuy. Early Andean varieties were kept mainly as livestock for food. These local landrace populations became part of the foundation for some modern domestic breeds.

Guinea pigs were exported to Europe in the late 16th or early 17th century, and later to North America in the 19th century, as part of the exotic pet trade. Their appeal as pets and exhibition animals was aided by the variety of their coat colours, patterns, and inherited traits.

As guinea pigs became established as companion and exhibition animals, breeders formed clubs and standards bodies to define and judge recognized breeds. The American Cavy Breeders Association governs guinea pig breeding in the United States and Canada and is affiliated with the American Rabbit Breeders Association.

In the United Kingdom, the British Cavy Council oversees cavy clubs and breed standards. The Rare Varieties Cavy Club works with the British Cavy Council to support new and emerging breeds.

In Australia and New Zealand, cavy breeding is governed by the Australian National Cavy Council and the New Zealand Cavy Council, respectively.

== Breed standards ==
Each cavy organization publishes its own standard of perfection and determines which breeds are eligible for exhibition. New breeds and varieties continue to appear, although they may not be recognized by every standards body. The ARBA Cavy Standard of Perfection states that "a proposed new cavy breed must possess qualifications of individual merit, unique to itself, identifying it as a separate and distinct breed". The standard also requires breeders to maintain a quality herd that can breed true for three generations.

Guinea pigs are commonly described as either pet-quality or show-quality. A show-quality guinea pig is one that conforms closely enough to its breed standard to compete in exhibitions. A pet-quality guinea pig may be a mixed-breed animal, may have faults under a breed standard, or may otherwise be unsuitable for exhibition.

The American, Abyssinian, Peruvian, and Sheltie or Silkie are among the long-established breeds commonly seen in competitive cavy shows.

Most standards include broad requirements that apply across breeds. These commonly address head shape, eye and ear size, body condition, coat quality, and the clarity and distribution of coat colour.

== Colorations ==
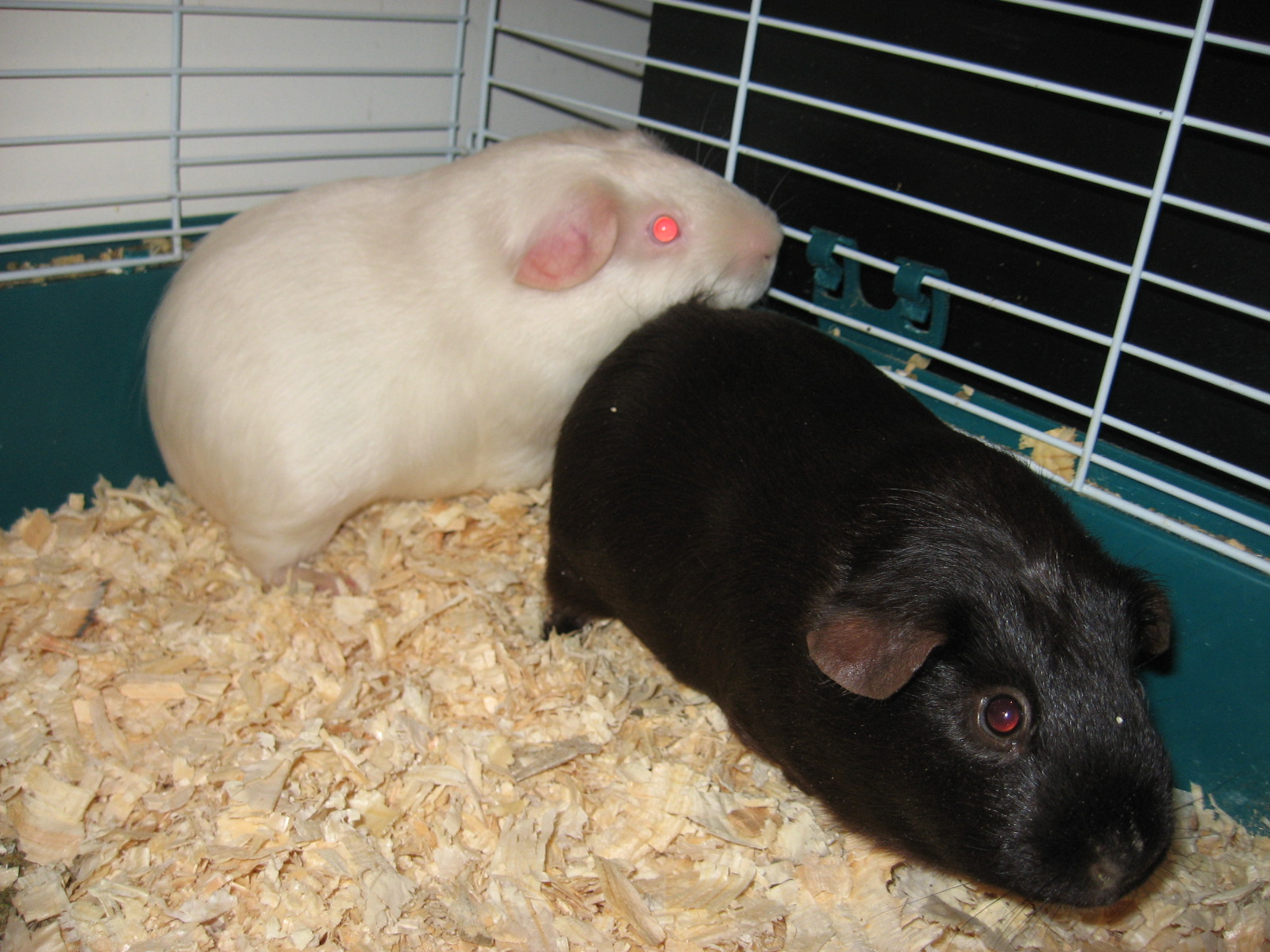
Two satin short-hair self cavies, one with black fur and one with pink eyes and white fur

Cavies of various breeds have several colorations and patterns. For short-coated cavies, most colors constitute breed variations bred and shown separately from other colors. All colorations should be true throughout the coat, with the roots and tips being of same shade.

In the case of broken-colored cavies, i.e. any cavies with other than separately recognized combinations of colors, the coloring is described in order of magnitude (i.e., a mostly lilac cavy with some cream and a speck of white would be called "lilac-cream-and-white", while a mostly white cavy with a patch of red-black ticking would be "white-and-golden-agouti").

=== Self ===
A self cavy is uniformly of one color, without any ticking or patterning. Self guinea pigs come in a variety of colors. The colors include black, chocolate, red, golden, buff, cream, white, lilac, beige, and slate.

=== Ticked ===
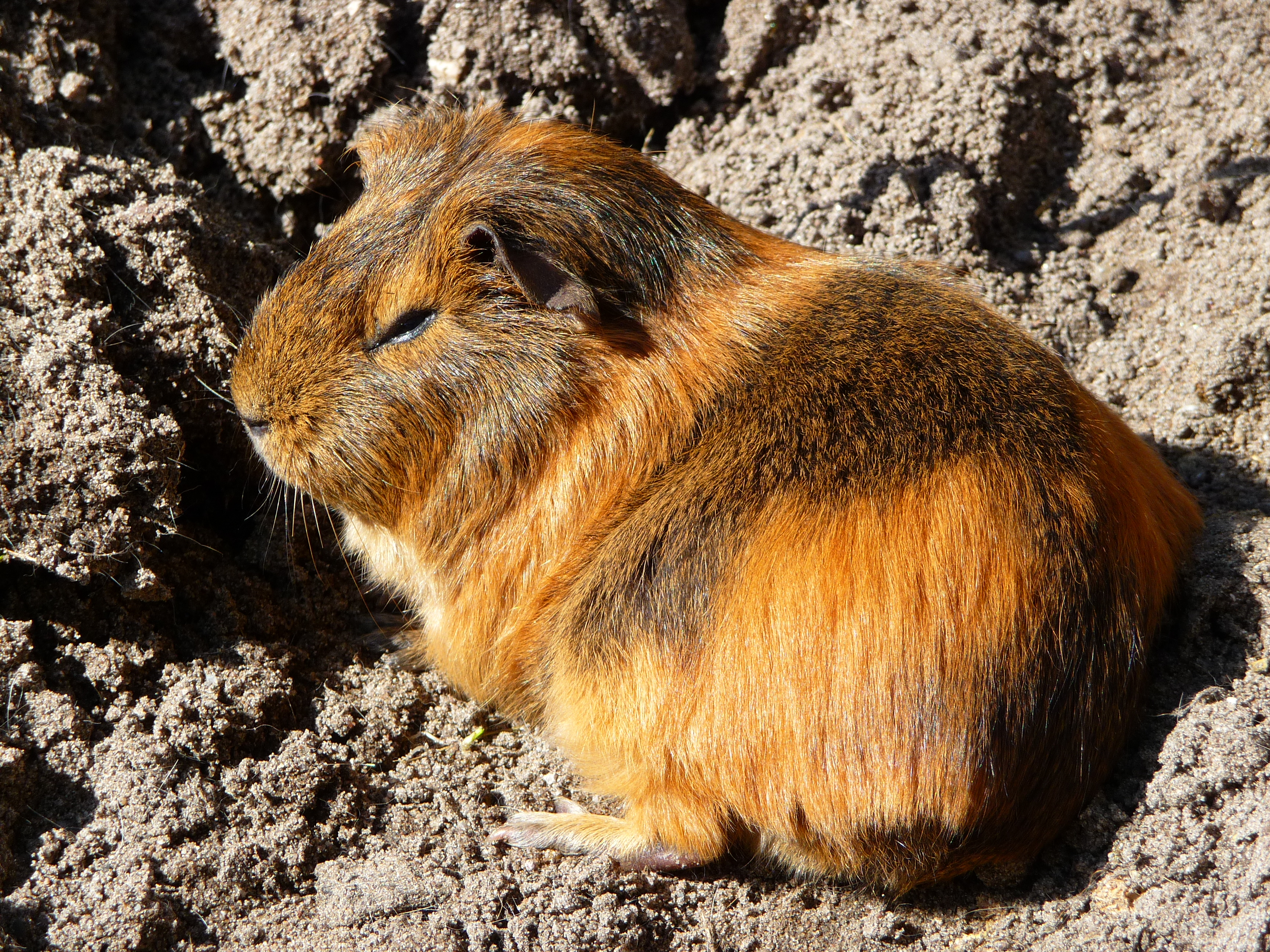
A guinea pig with golden coloring as well as ticking

Ticked cavies have black series hairs with red series ticking, i.e. each individual hair has stripes of both a black and a red series color. In case a ticked cavy also has the tortoiseshell pattern, the red series patches are uniformly colored while the black series patch.

==== Agouti ====
An agouti cavy has a solid colored belly and is otherwise fully ticked. Two common variations are the golden agouti, with black and red, and the silver agouti, with black and white. Any other color combinations in the US are called dilute agouti.

A solid agouti is completely ticked. Its variations are referred to like normal agoutis, i.e. a solid agouti with black and red would be called a golden solid agouti, and so forth.

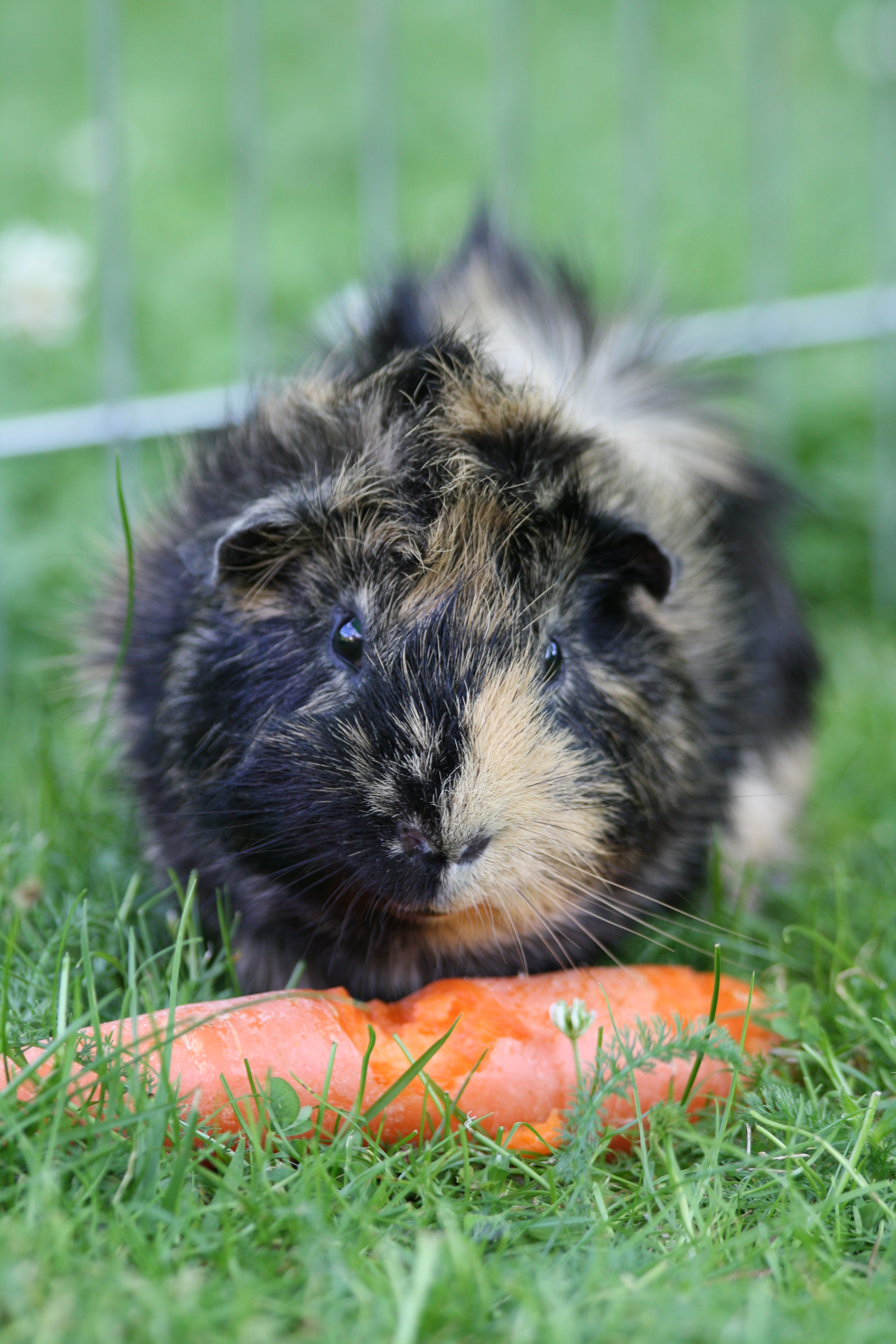
A black-and-buff brindle Abyssinian cavy

=== Brindle ===
A brindle cavy has intermixed hairs of both black and red series colors throughout their coats, with no ticking. An ideal show brindle appears uniformly colored, with both series appearing evenly all over.

==== Magpie ====
A magpie cavy is a particular form of brindle, with black for the black series, but substituting white for the red series. Magpie can easily be confused with "roan", although in magpie the white hairs can appear anywhere on the cavy.

=== Dutch pattern ===
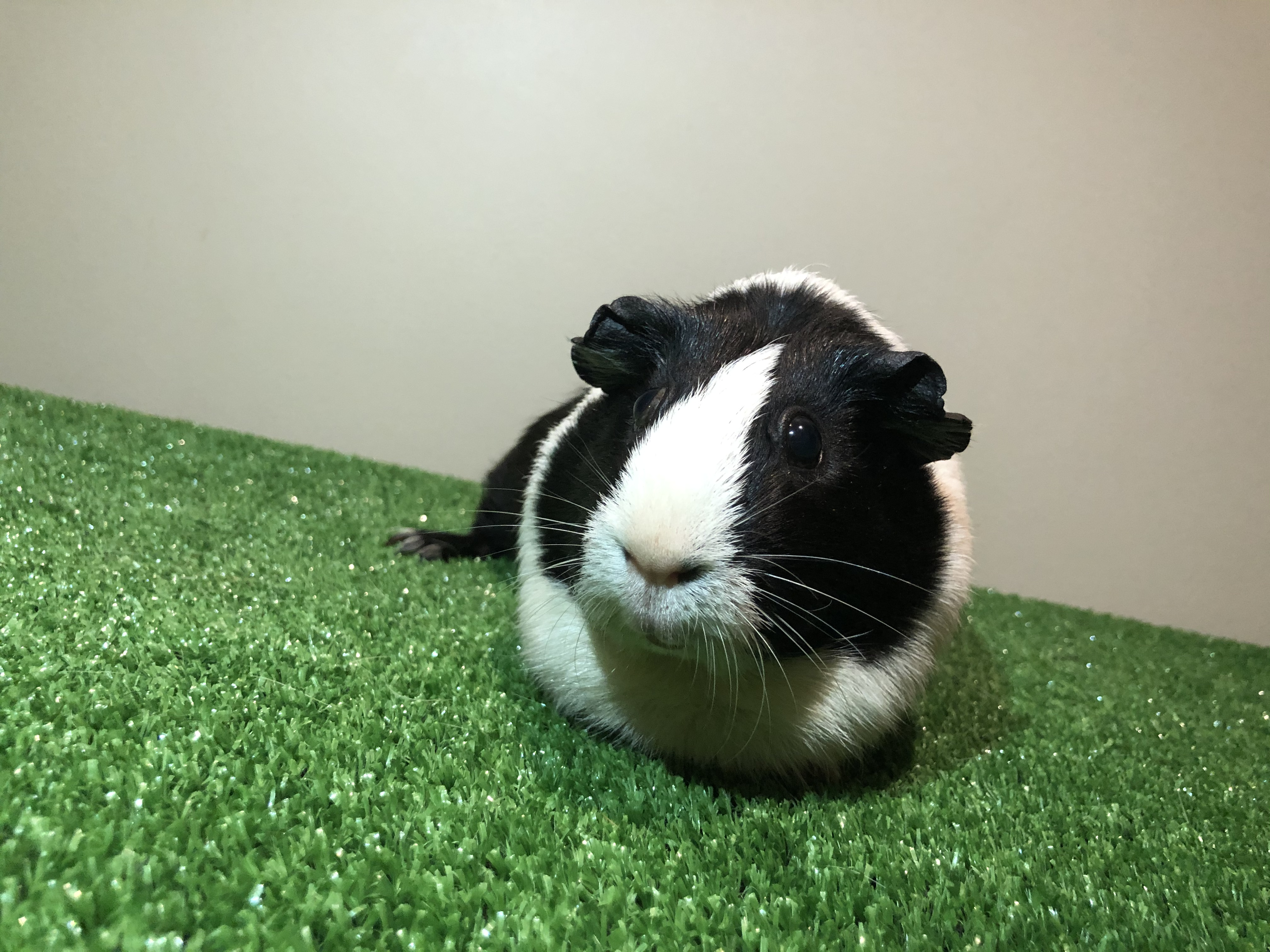
A Dutch guinea pig

A Dutch cavy has a specific white pattern: a blaze on the face, a wide white band around the neck, chest, and the belly, including the front paws, and white tips on the hind feet. The pattern is essentially the same as the Dutch pattern in rabbits, and was named after it.

=== Himalayan pattern ===
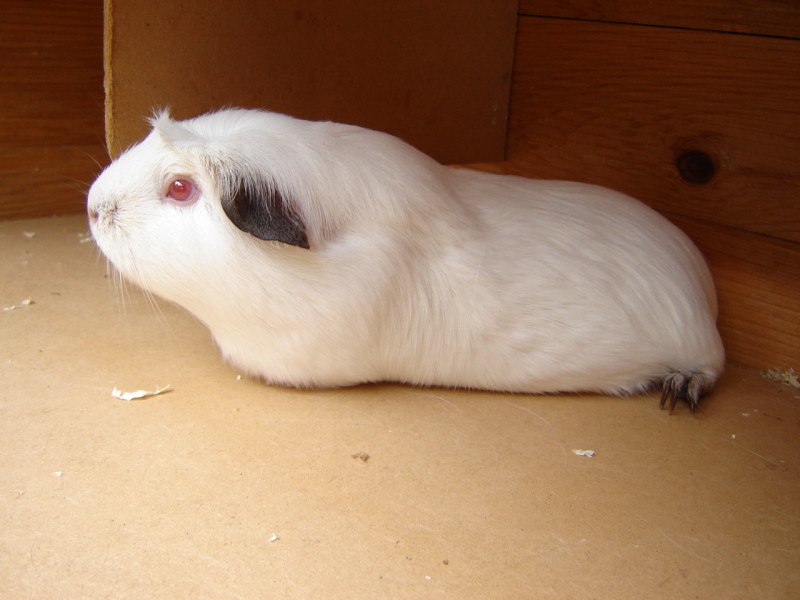
A Himalayan Guinea pig with its characteristic point coloring.

A Himalayan cavy has a white body with colored points (face, ears, feet). It is an acromelanic, i.e. temperature-responding coloration, and its degree of darkness depends on how cool or warm the cavy is kept. Show Himalayans should have black or dark brown points with ruby, i.e. dark red, eyes. The darkest areas should be the face, paws, and the feet.

A Himalayan cavy is born solid white, the points slowly gaining color after a few weeks.

=== Tan pattern ===
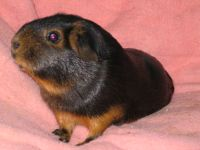
A "tan" cavy is actually mostly black.

A tan cavy is an otherwise solid black, with red ticking around the muzzle, around the eyes, in spots above the eyes, under the neck and the belly, and sparsely on the lower sides.

=== Otter and fox ===
Otter and fox cavies have yellow and white ticking, respectively. Different shades are named after the black series shade, for instance black otter, lilac-and-tan, and grey fox.

=== Tortoiseshell pattern ===
A tortoiseshell ("tortie" for short) cavy has patches of red and black. An ideal show tortoiseshell cavy has regular, well-defined patches of each color on each side, and appears to have lengthwise "seams" on its back and belly, almost similar to brindle. Diluted tortoiseshells are called broken colors, and diluted tortoiseshell-and-whites tricolors. They follow the same pattern ideal.

=== Roan and Dalmatian ===
A roan cavy has white hairs evenly intermixed on their body, while a Dalmatian (pattern) cavy has a white body with colored spots which can come in black, chocolate, or lilac. The latter is named after the spotted Dalmatian dog, and is not actually from Dalmatia. The head and the rump are mostly colored in both varieties. They are caused by the same gene, and whether a cavy appears roan or Dalmatian is defined by modifier factors. Many cavies have an intermediate roan/Dalmatian pattern, and these varieties are challenging to successfully breed in show quality.

The roan/Dalmatian factor, sometimes called the "lethal white gene" or simply "lethal gene", is incompletely dominant. While the roan/Dalmatian factor is consistently visible in heterozygous carriers that do not have other factors producing white hair, the pattern can be masked by extreme dilution (resulting in full white coloration) or extreme white spotting. The gene is lethal when homozygous, resulting in full white pups with varying combinations of deafness, blindness, loss of smell, and deformities. Some lethal pups may survive for some time, while others die soon after birth if not euthanized. Most roan/Dalmatian breeders breed them solely to lethal-non-carriers to avoid the 25% risk of homozygous pups that occurs breeding carrier-to-carrier.

== Satin variants and satin syndrome ==
In addition to their standard form, nearly all breeds come in a satin variant. Satin variant guinea pigs have an unusually glossy coat that looks luminous, 'glassy', or 'oily'.

Satin guinea pigs are not a distinct breed; they have a recessive genetic trait that makes their hair shafts thinner and more translucent. This genetic trait is not connected to hair texture and can be found in guinea pigs with all coat types.

The American Cavy Breeders Association recognizes satin variants of the Abyssinian, American, Peruvian, Silkie, and Teddy breeds, and has unique standards for these variants.

The genes responsible for the satin coat can cause severe health concerns, including Paget's disease. It's most commonly linked to 'satin syndrome', also known as osteodystrophy. Osteodystrophy is an incurable and potentially painful metabolic disease of the bones; its symptoms appear in cavies at around 12 to 18 months of age. These symptoms include a wobbly gait, problems eating, and parturition complications in sows. Osteodystrophy is a progressive disease that can also cause weakness, paralysis, and, eventually, death.

Due to animal welfare concerns, many registries— including the New Zealand, Swedish, and Finnish guinea pig associations— refuse to register satin cavies or cavies with a satin parent.

== American ==
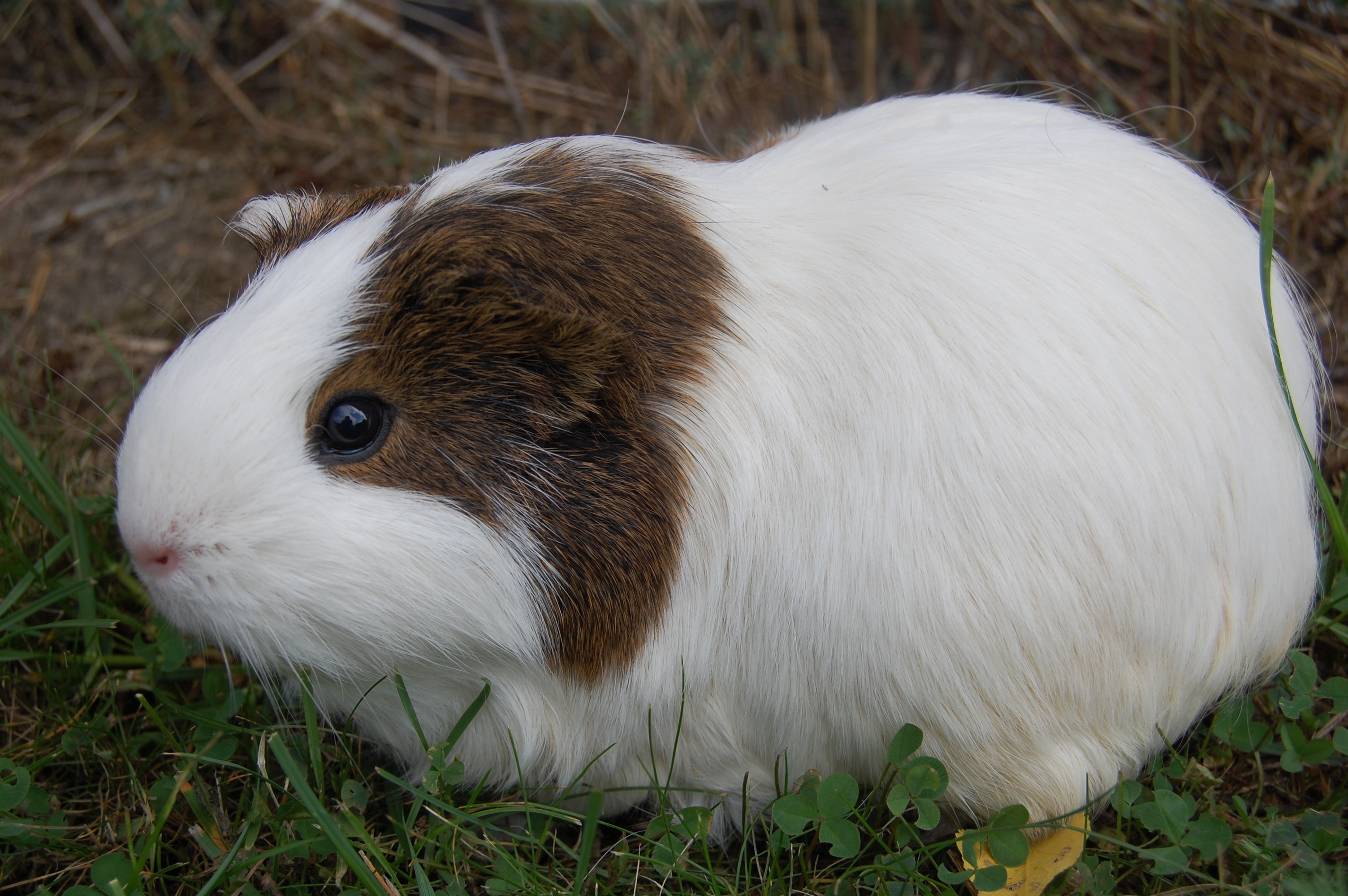
An American Guinea Pig

The most widespread breed of guinea pig, the American guinea pig, is a recognized breed by the American Rabbit Breeders Association (ARBA).

They are entered and shown in ARBA competitions in nineteen color classifications; Black, Cream, Red, White, Any Other Self (Beige, Chocolate, Lilac, Red-Eyed Orange), Brindle, Roan, Dilute Solid, Golden Solid, Silver Solid, Dilute Agouti, Golden Agouti, Silver Agouti, Dalmatian, Dutch, Himalayan, Tortoise Shell & White, Any Other Marked (Broken Color and Tortoise Shell), and Tan Pattern (Black Tan, Blue Tan, Chocolate Tan, Beige Tan, and Lilac Tan).

The American should have a broad shoulder, Roman nose, and full crown, and the coat is to be short, straight and feel silky. The coat is faulted for feathering, harshness, or being too thin or long. Contestants are disqualified for ridges, rosettes, side whiskers, or a satin sheen, though this should not be confused with the natural luster of some varieties. The ears are to be drooping but not fallen, and the eyes are to be bold and bright. The American guinea pig is to be posed with the hind feet under the animal and the front feet slightly ahead of the shoulders, and should not be forced into a cobby position or stretched out.

The American is known for its sweet and docile temperament, and is often considered for first time cavy owners.

=== American Crested ===
The American Crested is a short-haired guinea pig with a distinctive crest of hair on the top of its head that is a different color than the rest of its body.

=== English Crested ===
An English Crested is a breed of guinea with a short, smooth coat and a crest on its head that is the same color as its body.

=== White Crested ===
The White Crested is similar to the American, but they have one white rosette on the forehead. The breed standards and ideals are nearly identical, with the exception that a White Crested cavy's crest should be completely of a color different from the rest of the animal. Most usually the crest is white, as necessitated by the ACBA standard. No other white hair should be present in the animal. By this standard, White Cresteds are not bred in colorations that have white anywhere on the body, such as Dutch, roan, and Dalmatian.

== Abyssinian ==
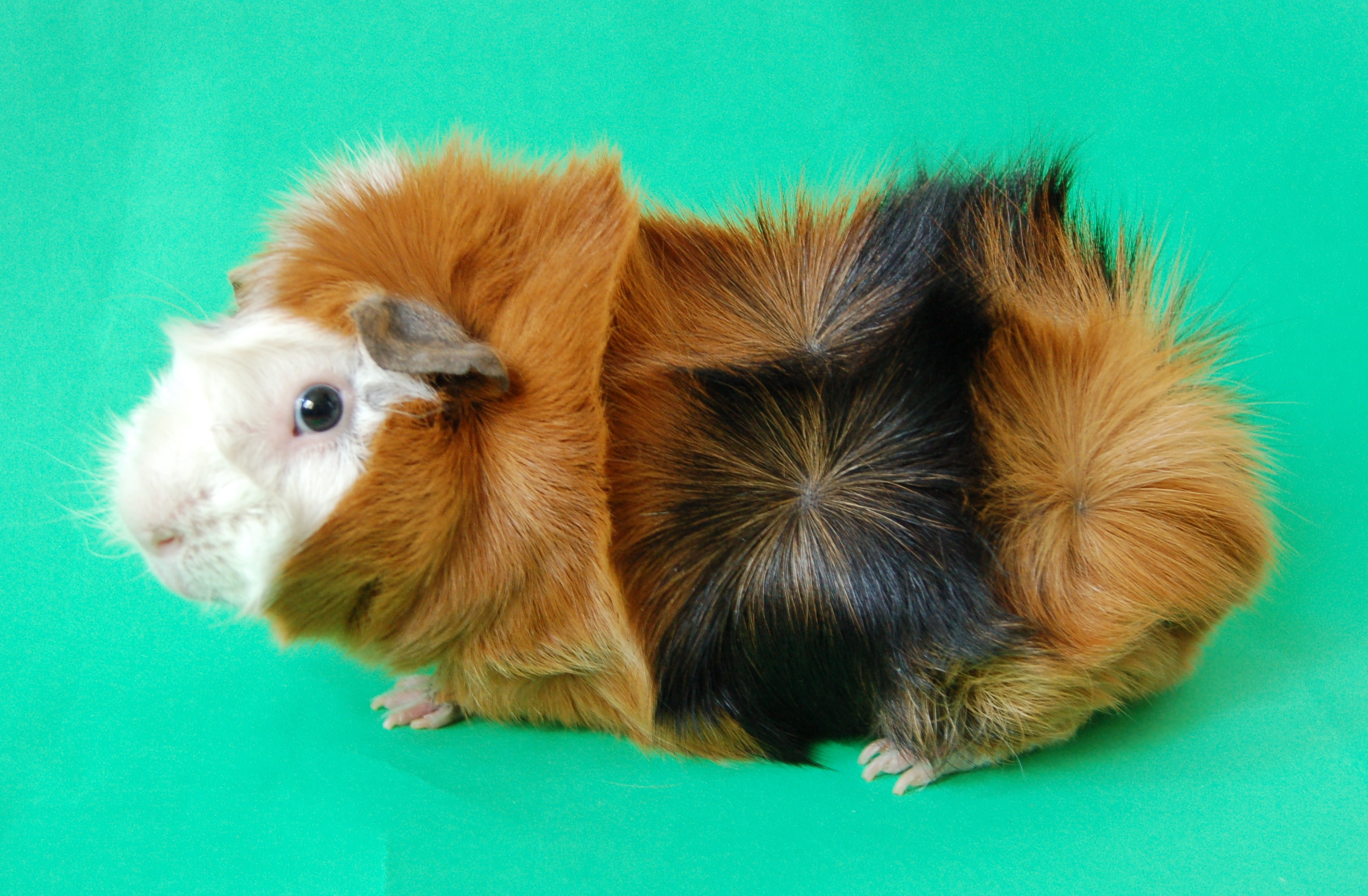
Male champion Abyssinian cavy with tortoiseshell-and-white coloring

The derivation of the breed's name is unknown, but does not connote an origin in the geographical region of Abyssinia (present day Ethiopia). They are one of the oldest breeds of guinea pig.

The Abyssinian breed is known for their 'rosettes', which are cowlicks growing from the coat.

Between the rosettes of the Abyssinian's hair are the ridges, worth 25 points by ARBA standard. The ridges between two rosettes should ideally stand rigidly straight, without breaking down onto either side even if pressed down lightly with the palm of a hand. There should be a collar ridge, back ridge, rump ridge, and ridges between every saddle, hip, and rump rosette. ARBA faults for flatness of coat, crooked ridges, a short coat, and soft texture. Other hair disqualifications include a coat over 1.5 inches in length and a satin sheen (not to be confused by the natural luster of some varieties). Required head furnishings (5 points by ARBA standard) include a well formed mustache and an erect mane running down the head.

Abyssinians are deemed by many as good pets for experienced owners.

== Peruvian ==
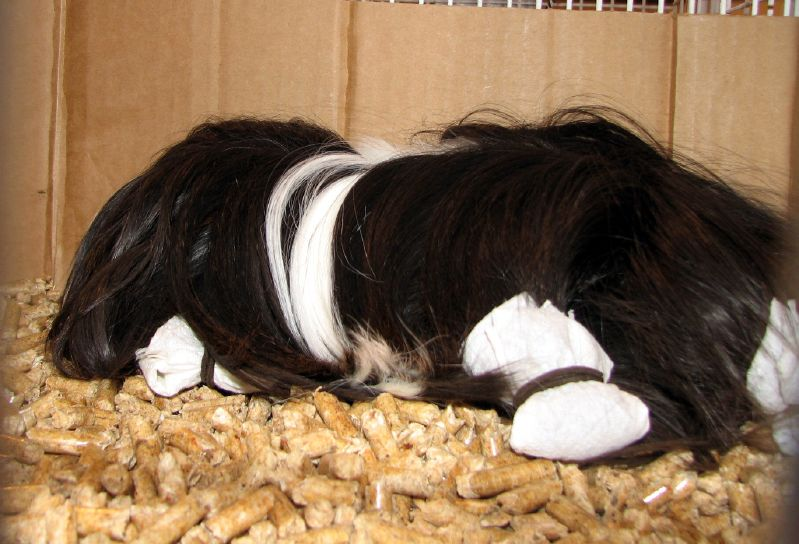
A show Peruvian with hair wraps

The Peruvian, formerly the Angora, has a long smooth coat all over its body that may reach the floor, including a prominent "forelock" resulting from a portion of its coat on the head and the neck growing forward on the body. They have a middle parting and typically have rosettes on their head and thighs. Their long hair is an autosomal recessive characteristic that is inherited. When two different length hair types are crossed, the shorter hair length will be the dominant one shown.

Peruvians may come in a Satin variant, featuring a silkier and more lustrous coat.

The Peruvian is generally not recommended for first time guinea pig owners, due to the tediousness of grooming their long coat.

Scientists at La Molina's National University have bred the Peruvian to grow even larger, weighing up to two pounds.

== Silkie ==
The Silkie breed, also called Sheltie in the United Kingdom, originated in the United Kingdom during the 1970s from a crossbreed between a Peruvian and an American Shorthair.

They are understood to generally have a tamer personality than most other guinea pig breeds.

They have a long, smooth coat, with hair that flows back over the body that may grow up to 24 inches in length. A Silkie must never have any rosettes or any hair growing in the direction towards its face. Its coat should not have a part. When viewed from above, a Silkie and its coat forms a teardrop shape. The coat is generally accepted to have a somewhat longer sweep of hair in the rear. Silkies may also have a satin coat, which is glossier and smoother than that of its standard coat. Their weight differs significantly from guinea pig to guinea pig, ranging from 1 to 3 Ib.

As with the Peruvian and other long haired breeds of guinea pig, they require more work to groom their thick coat, and thus are not recommended for first time guinea pig owners.

== Coronet ==
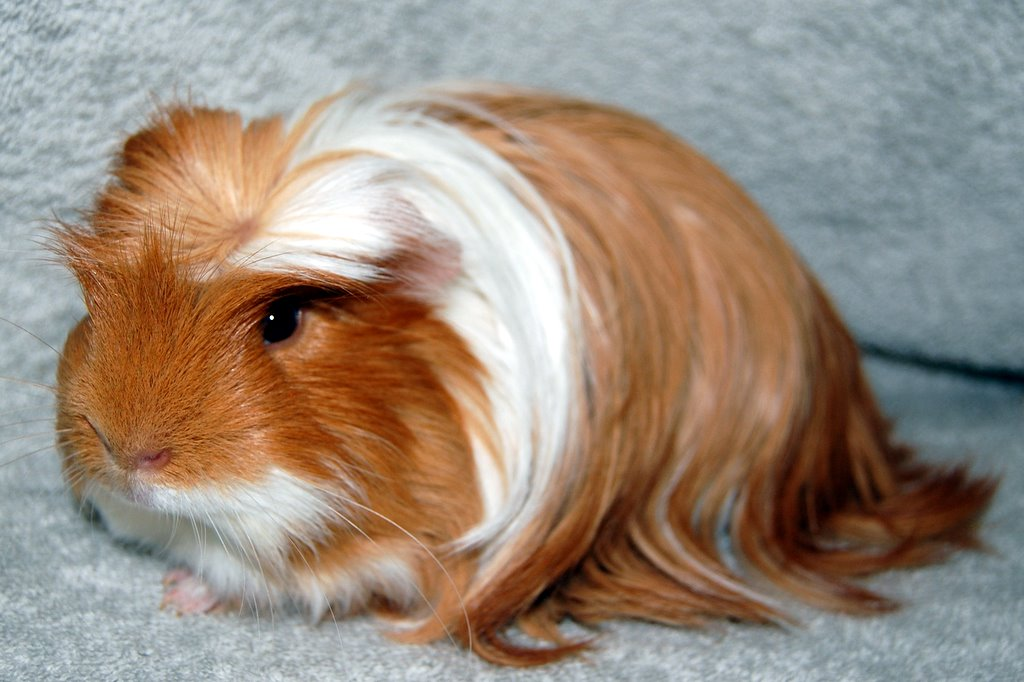
A Coronet cavy

The Coronet resembles the Silkie with its smooth coat growing backward over its body, but it has a crest on its forehead. As with the short-coated crested breeds, this crest should be symmetrical and distinct with a small centre and no sticking hairs. The ears of a coronet may also droop slightly.

== Lunkarya group ==
The Lunkarya, or "Lunk" for short, is a new group of related breeds developed in Sweden and mainly seen in the Nordic countries. These breeds have long, rough, curly coats that should be very dense and full. The group has three breed variations: the Lunkarya Peruvian (with a prominent forelock), the Lunkarya Sheltie (with hair flowing back over the body), and the Lunkarya Coronet (with a crest on the forehead).

It was initially described as a "dominant rex Peruvian", but later was named Lunkarya, a variation of the last name of the breed's creator: Lundqvist.

This breed is not recognized by the American Rabbit Breeders Association.

== Rex ==
A Rex is a breed of guinea pig known for its short, dense, and very coarse wiry fur that stands upright, giving it a somewhat hedgehog-like appearance. They are popular pets due to their calm, gentle temperament and low maintenance grooming needs, as their fur doesn't require frequent brushing like some other guinea pig breeds.

== Texel ==
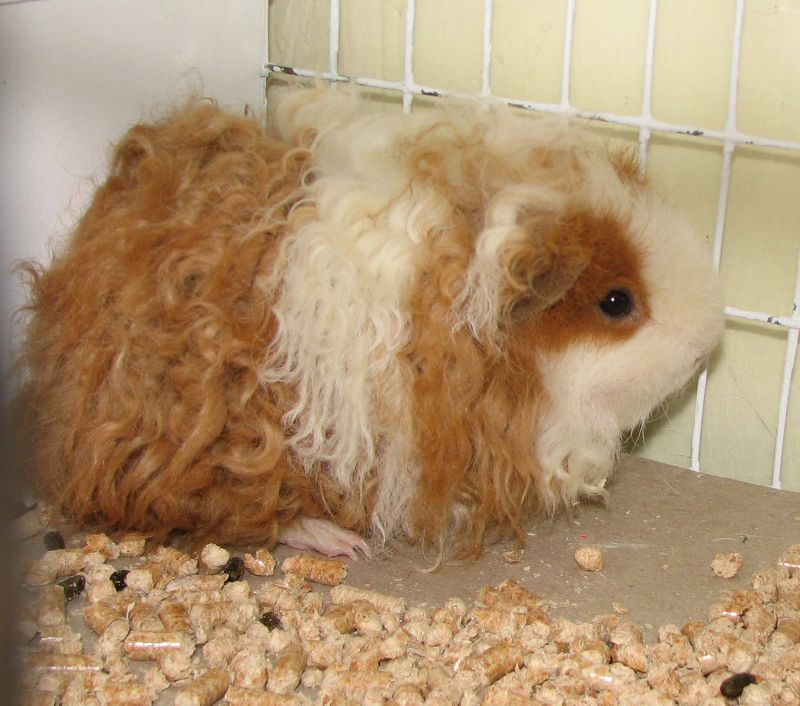
Texel guinea pig

Texel guinea pigs originated in Britain in the 1980s, and are a crossbreed between the Silkie and the British Rex. They were officially recognized by the American Cavy Breeders Association in 1988.

The mix between the Silkie's smooth long coat and Rex's curly coat characterize them with a long, curly coat and fur that is coarser, not so curly, and shorter around their faces. As with many other long haired breeds, they require more care to brush their long coat to avoid knotting or tangling. They generally weigh 1.5 to 2.5 Ib, on the smaller end of guinea pig breeds.

=== Merino ===
The Merino, or English Merino, is a texel with a crown (also known as a crest) on its head. It is recognized in Europe as a standard breed.

== Sheba ==
The Sheba, also called the"Sheba Mini Yak", is a relative of the hairless guinea. It is a long-haired, rosetted cavy characterized by "mutton chop" whiskers. It is often referred to as the "Bad-Hair-Day Cavy". The Sheba has a frontal presented to one side of the face in a naturally tousled appearance. They are recognized as a cavy breed in Australia. Their breed standard was developed by Wynne Eecen of Sydney, in the 1970s, and was published in her book Pigs Isn't Pigs.

This breed is not recognized by the American Rabbit Breeders Association.

== Teddy ==
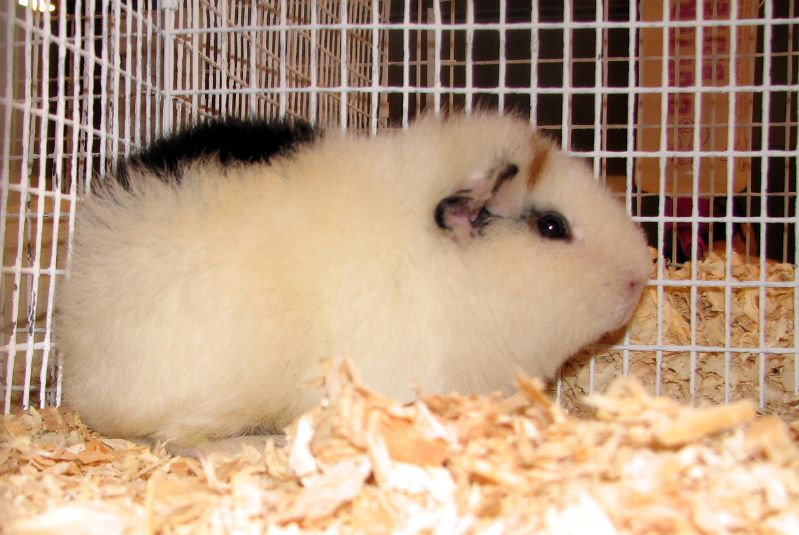
Teddy guinea pig

A Teddy, developed from a mutation, has a short, rough, very dense, springy coat that stands up all over the body. The hair typically grows to a moderate length and makes this breed resemble a soft toy more than any other. Another unique feature of Teddies in the US is the relatively long hair coating their bellies. The Teddy has a kinky, springy coat that is famous for its soft, cuddly quality, often compared to an old teddy bear. They come in Plush Coat and Harsh Coat; the plush-coated animals have a softer coat, while the harsh-coated ones have a coarser texture to their hair. They come in a Satin variant.

Teddy bear guinea pigs are typically on the average to larger end of guinea pig breeds, weighing 1.5 to 3.0 Ib on average.

== Hairless varieties ==
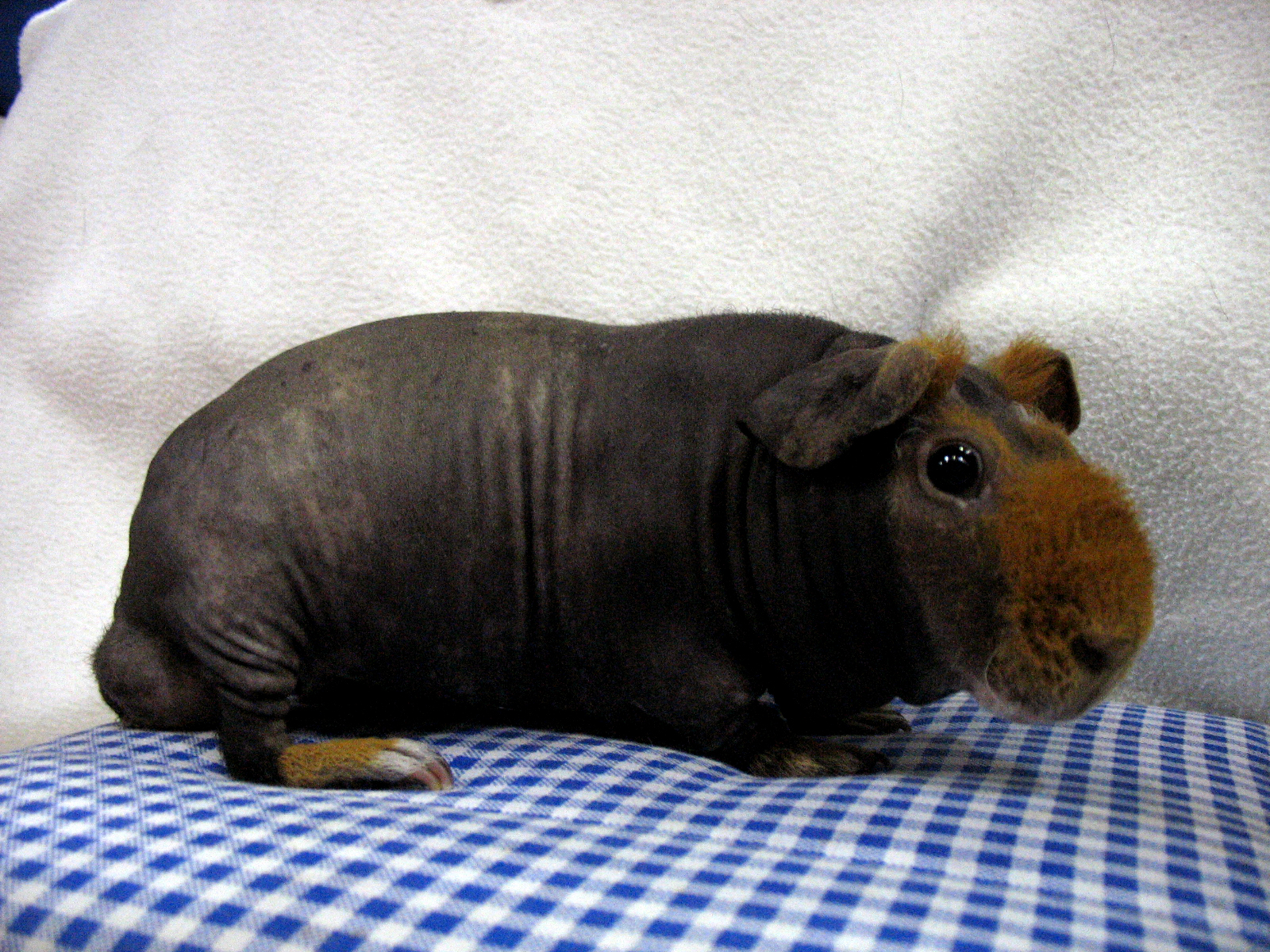
Skinny pig male

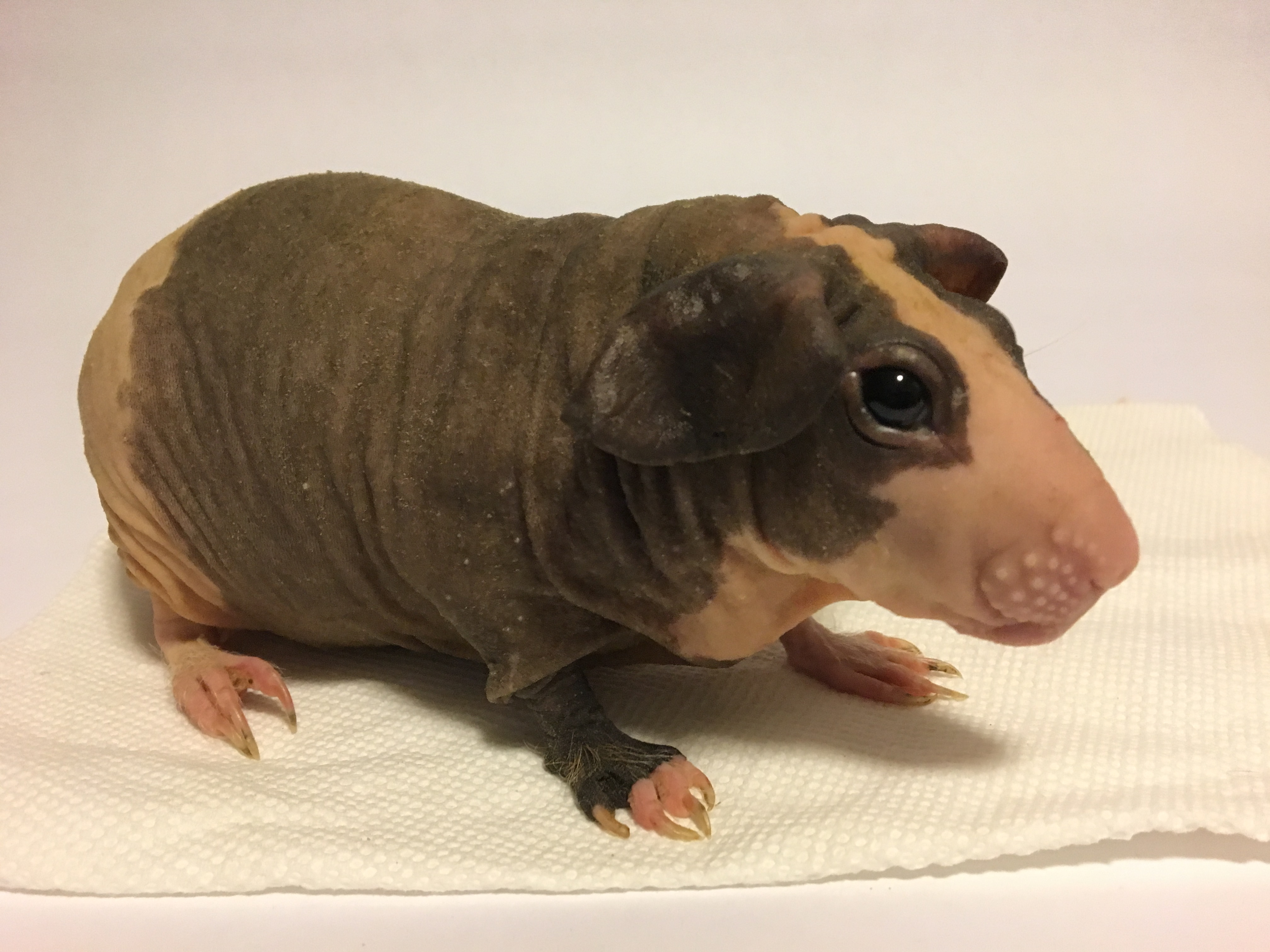
Baldwin guinea pig female

Only two varieties of the hairless guinea pig exist: the Skinny and the Baldwin. They are two separate breeds with different genetic factors rendering them hairless. Hairless cavies in general need warmer accommodation and more energy-rich food (foods to avoid) to compensate for the loss of body heat. They are also susceptible to draughts (breezes), drying of the skin, and skin infections without careful husbandry.

=== Skinny ===
The Skinny stands out for being a mostly hairless breed, with some short rough hair on the face and feet. Pups are born nearly hairless, unlike the Baldwin which loses its hair.

The breed was developed from a hairless laboratory strain that was crossed with Teddies and other haired breeds: a form of outcrossing.

=== Baldwin ===
The Baldwin, like the Skinny, is a nearly hairless breed. However, Baldwins are born with a full coat, which sheds out with age until only a little hair remains on the feet (the Skinny also has hair on the face).

The breed was developed from spontaneously mutated pups born to American Crested parents of a single breeder.
