= Judge Baldwin =

Judge Baldwin may refer to:

- Alexander W. Baldwin (1835–1869), judge of the United States District Court for the District of Nevada
- James H. Baldwin (1876–1944), judge of the United States District Court for the District of Montana
- Phillip Baldwin (1924–2002), judge of the United States Court of Appeals for the Federal Circuit

== See also ==
- Justice Baldwin (disambiguation)
