= Baldwin River =

Baldwin River may refer to:

- Baldwin River (Isle of Man), a tributary of the River Glass
- Baldwin River (Michigan), a tributary of the Pere Marquette River

== See also ==
- Baldwin (disambiguation)
