= Baldwin guinea pig =

Breed of guinea pig

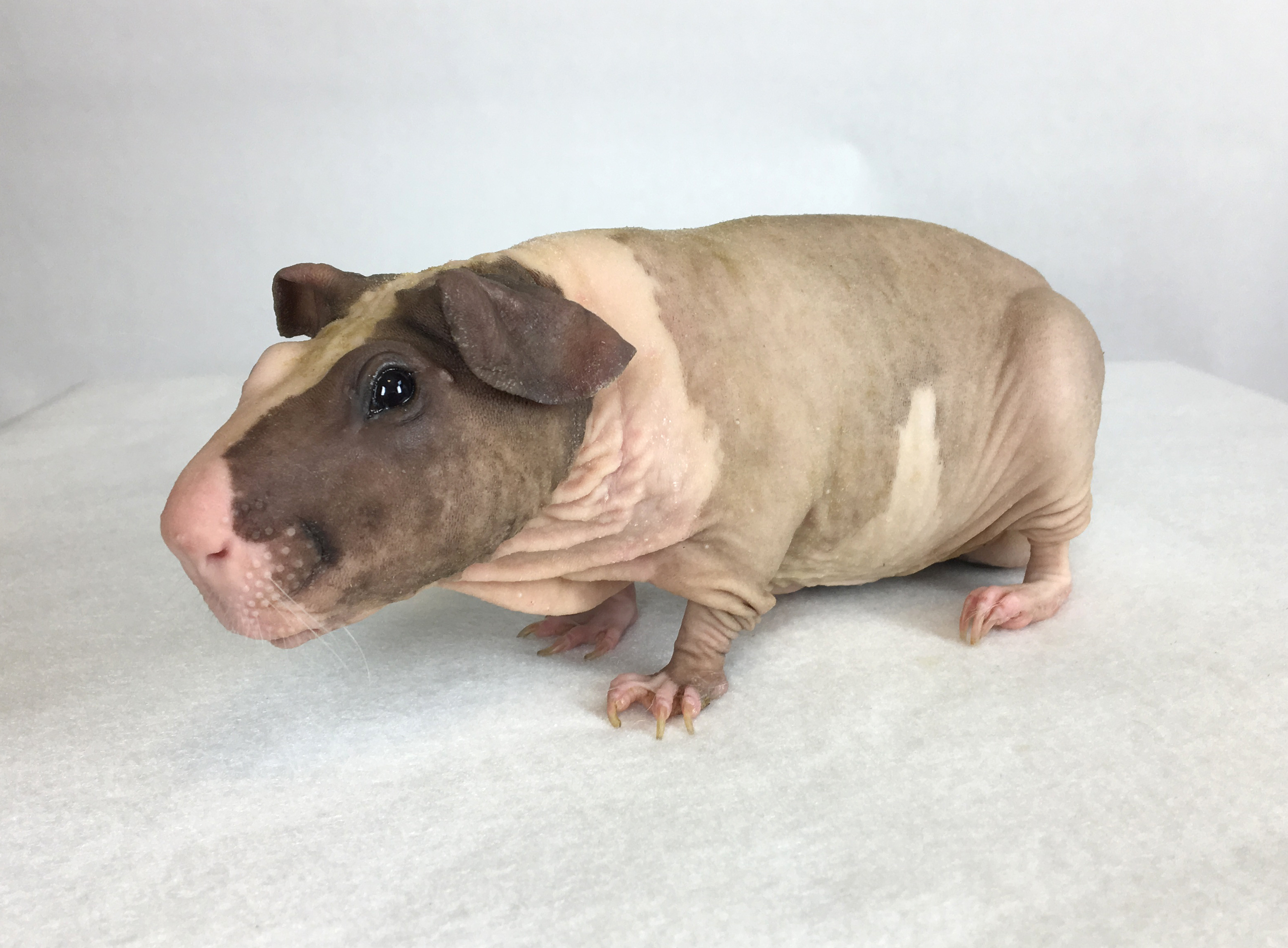
- Adult male Baldwin guinea pig
- Conservation status: Domesticated
- Nicknames: Cavy
- Country of origin: United States

Traits
- Lifespan: 5-7 years
- Fur type: Hairless

The Baldwin guinea pig is a breed developed from a spontaneous genetic mutation in Carol Miller's show-line of white crested golden agouti. Though born fully furred, Baldwin guinea pigs begin to lose their fur at two to five days of age, starting at the nose and leaving them almost entirely hairless by about two months of age. They retain whiskers and sometimes a few hairs on their feet.

Baldwins are known for having skin of a rubbery texture, many wrinkles and large, droopy ears. They come in all colors and patterns that haired guinea pigs come in, such as Dutch, tortoiseshell, broken colors, Himalayan and selfs.

== Unique traits ==
Hairless guinea pigs are not significantly physiologically different than regular haired guinea pigs, although they need to eat more to maintain body heat. The optimal temperature range for a hairless guinea pig is 75 to 79 °F (24 to 26 °C), which is slightly higher than the optimal temperature range for the haired guinea pig.

Their skin has a similar appearance to human skin, but has a more rubbery texture. Their skin is quite vulnerable to sunburn, other injuries and fungal infections unless precautions are taken. Baldwin guinea pigs should be housed indoors and they are usually kept with nesting materials such as a blanket, fleece bag or small plastic or wooden house for heat conservation. Heating pads or other external heat sources may be needed when the weather is cold.

The gene causing hairlessness in Baldwin guinea pigs is a recessive gene, and breeding two Baldwins together will always result in all offspring being Baldwins. Breeding a Baldwin guinea pig to a standard haired guinea pig will result in offspring that all carry one copy of the gene, but none will express hairlessness. These offspring are generally called Baldwin carriers. Breeding two Baldwin carriers together will (on average) result in 25% offspring being Baldwins, 50% offspring being Baldwin carriers and 25% offspring being regular haired guinea pigs that do not carry the gene. Since the chance of getting a Baldwin is low, and because it is not possible to visually tell the difference between a haired guinea pig that does carry the gene and one that does not, this method of breeding is not recommended. Haired Baldwin carriers remain haired (looking like normal guinea pigs) their entire life.

There is a second type of hairless guinea pig called the Skinny pig, but its hairlessness is the result of a completely different recessive gene. Breeding a Skinny pig with a Baldwin will result entirely in offspring that are haired yet carry one copy of the gene for Skinny pig hairlessness and one copy of the gene for Baldwin hairlessness.

Even though the Baldwin is a relatively new breed among pet owners and cavy fanciers, it is gaining popularity for its unique appearance.

== See also ==
- Nude mouse
- Naked mole-rat
- Guinea pig breed
- Skinny pig
