= Justice Baldwin =

Justice Baldwin may refer to:

- Briscoe Baldwin (1789–1852), associate justice of the Virginia Supreme Court of Appeals
- Caleb Baldwin (judge) (1824–1876), associate justice of the Iowa Supreme Court
- Cynthia Baldwin (fl. 1980s–2010s), associate justice of the Pennsylvania Supreme Court
- Henry Baldwin (judge) (1780–1844), associate justice of the Supreme Court of the United States
- Joseph G. Baldwin (1815–1864), justice of the Supreme Court of California
- Richard C. Baldwin (born 1947), associate justice of the Oregon Supreme Court
- Simeon Baldwin (1761–1851), associate justice of the Connecticut Supreme Court of Errors from 1808 to 1818
- Simeon E. Baldwin (1840–1927), associate justice of the Connecticut Supreme Court of Errors from 1893 to 1910

== See also ==
- Judge Baldwin (disambiguation)
