= Nude mouse =

Lab mouse strain lacking immunity and fur

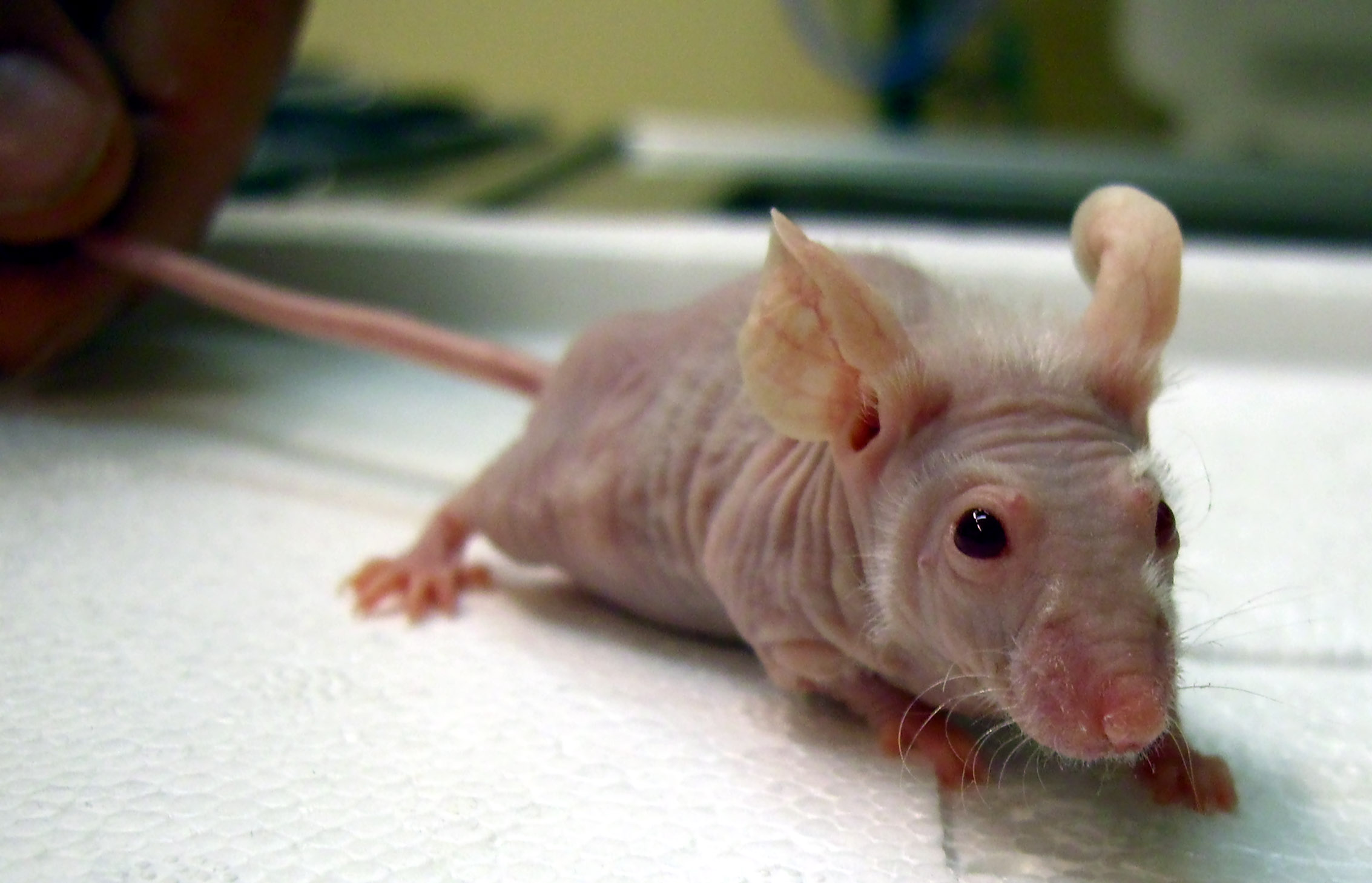
A nude mouse

A nude mouse is a laboratory mouse from a strain with a genetic mutation that causes a deteriorated or absent thymus, resulting in an inhibited immune system due to a greatly reduced number of T cells. The phenotype (main outward appearance) of the mouse is a lack of body hair, which gives it the "nude" nickname. The nude mouse is valuable to research because it can receive many different types of tissue and tumor grafts, as it mounts no rejection response. These xenografts are commonly used in research to test new methods of imaging and treating tumors. The genetic basis of the nude mouse mutation is a disruption of the FOXN1 gene.

== Description ==
At birth, nude mice are characterized by skin containing normal hair follicles; however, during the development of the hair shaft, it undergoes a coiling within the infundibulum that prevents its emergence through the epidermis.

== Nomenclature ==
The nomenclature for the nude mouse has changed several times since their discovery. Originally they were described as nu and this was updated to Hfh11nu when the mutated gene was identified as a mutation in the HNF-3/forkhead homolog 11 gene. Then in 2000, the gene responsible for the mutation was identified as a member of the Fox gene family and the nomenclature was updated to Foxn1nu.

== History and significance ==
Nude mice were first discovered in 1962 by Dr. Norman R. Grist at Ruchill Hospital's Brownlee virology laboratory in Glasgow. Because they lack a thymus, nude mice cannot generate mature T lymphocytes. Therefore they are unable to mount many types of adaptive immune responses, including:

1. antibody formation that requires CD4+ helper T cells
2. cell-mediated immune responses, which require CD4+ and/or CD8+ T cells
3. delayed-type hypersensitivity responses (require CD4+ T cells)
4. killing of virus-infected or malignant cells (requires CD8+ cytotoxic T cells)
5. graft rejection (requires both CD4+ and CD8+ T cells)

Because of the above features, nude mice have served in the laboratory to gain insights into the immune system, leukemia, solid tumors, AIDS and other forms of immune deficiency as well as leprosy. Moreover, the absence of functioning T cells prevents nude mice from rejecting not only allografts (grafts of tissue from other mice) but also xenografts (grafts of tissue from another species).

Most strains of nude mice are slightly "leaky" and do have a few T cells, especially as they age. In addition, knockout mice with more complete defects in the immune system have been constructed (e.g. RAG1 and RAG2 knockout mice). For these reasons, nude mice are less popular in research today.

== Genetics ==
Nude mice have a spontaneous deletion in the FOXN1 gene. (Humans with mutations in FOXN1 also are athymic and immune deficient.) Mice with a targeted deletion in the FOXN1 ("knockout" mice) also show the "nude" phenotype. Since nude females have underdeveloped mammary glands and are unable to effectively nurse their young, nude males are bred with heterozygous females.

== Life span ==
The life span of nude mice is normally 6 months to a year. In controlled, germ free environments and with antibiotic treatments found in many laboratories that routinely use nude mice, they can live almost as long as normal mice (18 months to two years).

== See also ==
- Skinny pig
- Earmouse
