= American Cavy Breeders Association =

The American Cavy Breeders Association (ACBA) is a national specialty club under the American Rabbit Breeders Association (ARBA). Like many other specialty clubs under ARBA, the ACBA maintains a membership, awards sweepstakes points, provides special awards, publishes a newsletter and contributes to developing new standards. The ACBA has wider responsibilities than other specialty clubs under ARBA because it is the only national specialty club for cavies (also called Guinea Pigs) and supports all currently recognized breeds, whereas most of the other ARBA national specialty clubs are devoted to a single rabbit breed. The exceptions (such as the National Angora Rabbit Breeders Association) are a handful of very similar breeds with combined clubs.

The official acceptance of breeds and varieties, the requirement for permanent earmarking and other show requirements are all regulated by ARBA.
