= List of barangays in Aurora (province) =

The province of Aurora has 151 barangays comprising its 8 municipalities.

== Barangays ==
Most populous in its respective municipality (as of 2010)

Barangay	Population					Municipality
Barangay	2010	2007	2000	1995	1990	Municipality
Abuleg	1,190	1,132	1,112	939	834	Dinalungan
Alcala	521	434	449	369	354	Maria Aurora
Aplaya	1,619	1,493	1,155	1,014	850	Dingalan
Bacong	1,723	1,643	1,198	1,218	944	San Luis
Bagtu	748	721	622	540	571	Maria Aurora
Bangco	636	571	538	489	482	Maria Aurora
Bannawag	492	472	423	365	316	Maria Aurora
Barangay 1 (Poblacion)	799	727	732	724	628	Casiguran
Barangay 2 (Poblacion)	665	643	612	716	531	Casiguran
Barangay 3 (Poblacion)	257	179	253	263	304	Casiguran
Barangay 4 (Poblacion)	302	254	305	328	331	Casiguran
Barangay 5 (Poblacion)	432	381	465	474	466	Casiguran
Barangay 6 (Poblacion)	310	310	330	317	338	Casiguran
Barangay 7 (Poblacion)	278	275	258	307	259	Casiguran
Barangay 8 (Poblacion)	601	547	523	447	439	Casiguran
Barangay I (Poblacion)	717	841	802	1,030	1,109	Baler
Barangay I (Poblacion)	1,260	1,149	990	908	994	Maria Aurora
Barangay I (Poblacion)	406	397	408	466	329	San Luis
Barangay II (Poblacion)	374	390	516	676	685	Baler
Barangay II (Poblacion)	1,874	1,825	1,525	1,473	1,230	Maria Aurora
Barangay II (Poblacion)	763	686	654	625	478	San Luis
Barangay III (Poblacion)	434	449	482	592	657	Baler
Barangay III (Poblacion)	873	851	896	840	803	Maria Aurora
Barangay III (Poblacion)	640	626	587	648	398	San Luis
Barangay IV (Poblacion)	389	423	422	501	517	Baler
Barangay IV (Poblacion)	2,465	2,408	2,421	2,152	2,196	Maria Aurora
Barangay IV (Poblacion)	1,218	1,076	1,033	995	799	San Luis
Barangay V (Poblacion)	1,662	1,827	1,485	1,436	1,126	Baler
Baubo	634	546	497	478	386	Maria Aurora
Bayabas	914	866	840	814	741	Dipaculao
Bayanihan	1,325	1,162	885	814	763	Maria Aurora
Bazal	1,274	1,198	1,199	1,006	902	Maria Aurora
Bianuan	3,440	3,679	3,556	3,166	3,600	Casiguran
Borlongan	2,173	2,081	2,004	1,849	1,637	Dipaculao
Buenavista	554	522	500	396	278	Dipaculao
Buhangin	5,057	5,009	4,735	4,322	3,947	Baler
Butas na Bato	813	751	688	626	513	Dingalan
Cabituculan East	664	621	587	467	424	Maria Aurora
Cabituculan West	493	450	452	375	371	Maria Aurora
Cabog (Matawe)	3,090	2,812	2,542	2,114	1,629	Dingalan
Cadayacan	1,261	1,181	1,188	1,031	959	Maria Aurora
Calabgan	496	411	457	284	234	Casiguran
Calabuanan	3,221	3,274	2,947	2,454	2,336	Baler
Calangcuasan	1,099	1,096	1,064	983	921	Casiguran
Calantas	1,799	1,659	1,501	997	791	Casiguran
Calaocan	873	550	383	239	290	Dipaculao
Caragsacan	2,729	2,523	1,181	899	673	Dingalan
Cozo	1,618	1,517	1,442	1,165	1,185	Casiguran
Culat	630	572	462	551	463	Casiguran
Davildavilan	992	898	1,043	1,061	779	Dingalan
Debucao	1,293	1,227	1,175	1,257	1,009	Maria Aurora
Decoliat	457	433	432	372	324	Maria Aurora
Detailen	793	742	763	759	800	Maria Aurora
Diaat	1,460	1,365	1,467	1,296	1,370	Maria Aurora
Diagyan	2,537	2,583	3,012	2,885	2,712	Dilasag
Dialatman	183	176	185	114	64	Maria Aurora
Diaman	239	214	120	172	230	Maria Aurora
Diamanen	172	130	42	25	57	Dipaculao
Dianawan	1,111	903	849	771	391	Maria Aurora
Dianed	588	525	494	406	299	Dipaculao
Diarabasin	1,621	1,399	1,569	1,357	1,191	Dipaculao
Dibacong	2,374	2,256	2,186	2,493	2,198	Casiguran
Dibalo	156	168	154	167	93	San Luis
Dibaraybay	1,283	1,090	878	583	384	Dinalungan
Dibayabay	1,152	990	818	783	487	San Luis
Dibet	971	922	1,005	802	797	Casiguran
Dibut	856	712	495	486	351	San Luis
Dibutunan	723	621	567	491	316	Dipaculao
Dicabasan	677	575	519	396	341	Dilasag
Dikapanikian	387	331	419	515	227	Dingalan
Dikapinisan	2,035	1,769	1,516	1,626	1,224	San Luis
Dikildit	908	814	828	795	900	Maria Aurora
Dilaguidi	1,015	989	957	802	795	Dilasag
Dimabuno	1,023	1,008	827	735	557	Dipaculao
Dimanayat	1,149	1,163	1,143	1,317	1,288	San Luis
Dimanpudso	1,296	1,266	1,181	1,074	1,227	Maria Aurora
Dimaseset	1,408	1,380	1,350	1,139	1,000	Dilasag
Dinadiawan	3,670	3,044	2,399	2,400	2,132	Dipaculao
Diniog	2,331	1,942	1,818	1,442	1,071	Dilasag
Diome	760	715	700	633	427	Maria Aurora
Ditale	1,297	1,042	1,007	972	922	Dipaculao
Ditawini	686	545	523	437	331	Dinalungan
Diteki	1,432	1,485	1,520	1,762	1,181	San Luis
Ditinagyan	587	478	461	357	344	Casiguran
Ditumabo	3,318	3,231	2,963	2,779	2,493	San Luis
Esperanza	458	486	368	347	505	Casiguran
Esperanza	1,241	1,065	1,031	830	170	Dilasag
Esteves	1,786	1,390	1,368	1,082	939	Casiguran
Estonilo	755	649	665	661	498	Maria Aurora
Florida	1,635	1,492	1,362	1,207	941	Maria Aurora
Galintuja	598	639	775	684	326	Maria Aurora
Gupa	991	942	836	866	697	Dipaculao
Ibona	3,185	3,099	2,849	2,839	2,750	Dingalan
Ipil	1,149	1,080	957	996	901	Dipaculao
L. Pimentel	914	880	691	637	681	San Luis
Laboy	404	354	370	305	320	Dipaculao
Lawang	379	388	374	291	158	Dilasag
Lipit	818	812	701	467	534	Dipaculao
Lobbot	475	380	250	203	231	Dipaculao
Lual	1,482	1,379	1,207	1,386	1,036	Casiguran
Malasin	593	609	565	519	454	Maria Aurora
Maligaya	574	649	529	566	481	Dipaculao
Maligaya (Poblacion)	1,801	1,731	1,597	1,383	1,218	Dilasag
Manggitahan	1,760	1,691	1,675	1,509	1,352	Dilasag
Mapalad	812	719	695	533	389	Dinalungan
Marikit	609	480	367	314	372	Casiguran
Masagana (Poblacion)	1,822	1,873	1,738	1,463	1,293	Dilasag
Mijares	1,014	809	761	672	608	Dipaculao
Mucdol	1,476	1,334	1,328	1,025	1,003	Dipaculao
Nipoo (Bulo)	896	859	888	693	515	Dinalungan
Nonong Senior	3,892	3,643	3,140	2,794	2,182	San Luis
North Poblacion	2,058	2,083	2,245	2,105	2,052	Dipaculao
Obligacion	1,135	1,041	856	858	921	Baler
Paleg	971	972	860	478	184	Dinalungan
Paltic	5,029	4,431	5,156	4,532	3,530	Dingalan
Pingit	4,989	4,355	2,972	2,164	1,724	Baler
Poblacion	1,091	1,011	1,112	1,181	931	Dingalan
Ponglo	543	500	319	313	273	Maria Aurora
Puangi	1,314	1,182	890	803	708	Dipaculao
Quirino	1,584	1,435	1,529	1,466	1,582	Maria Aurora
Ramada	1,134	1,038	912	900	903	Maria Aurora
Real	1,100	1,044	947	850	709	San Luis
Reserva	4,064	3,634	3,093	2,622	2,523	Baler
Sabang	4,829	4,816	4,212	3,959	3,721	Baler
Salay	1,323	1,121	1,118	1,088	1,002	Dipaculao
San Ildefonso	1,100	1,029	1,050	880	830	Casiguran
San Isidro	1,906	1,747	1,601	1,734	1,475	San Luis
San Joaquin	1,634	1,472	1,408	1,248	1,153	Maria Aurora
San Jose	1,460	1,446	1,375	1,220	1,211	Maria Aurora
San Jose	488	425	389	347	348	San Luis
San Juan	891	705	754	690	578	Maria Aurora
San Leonardo	475	506	379	401	358	Maria Aurora
Santa Lucia	541	426	392	389	414	Maria Aurora
Santo Tomas	684	552	523	488	339	Maria Aurora
Sapangkawayan	349	328	286	219	157	Dipaculao
Simbahan	1,631	1,428	1,289	1,050	832	Dinalungan
South Poblacion	1,688	1,644	1,830	1,817	1,621	Dipaculao
Suclayin	5,923	5,498	4,913	4,266	3,735	Baler
Suguit	564	521	502	429	447	Maria Aurora
Tabas	1,007	973	786	416	207	Casiguran
Tanawan	656	691	219	209	101	Dingalan
Tinib	765	760	701	779	670	Casiguran
Toytoyan	488	376	331	228	216	Dipaculao
Umiray (Malamig)	3,963	3,952	3,793	4,335	2,492	Dingalan
Ura	712	616	–	–	–	Dilasag
Villa Aurora	751	679	564	544	827	Maria Aurora
Wenceslao	1,266	1,176	1,155	1,087	581	Maria Aurora
Zabali	3,216	2,935	2,488	2,039	1,688	Baler
Zarah	2,128	2,081	1,999	1,713	1,280	San Luis
Zone I (Poblacion)	1,866	1,761	1,742	1,666	1,511	Dinalungan
Zone II (Poblacion)	1,653	1,639	1,724	1,808	1,790	Dinalungan
Barangay	2010	2007	2000	1995	1990	Municipality
*Italicized names are former names.; *Dashes (–) in cells indicate unavailable census data.

[top]
