= Maria Aurora =

Maria Aurora may refer to:

== People ==
- Maria Aurora Salvagno, Italian sprinter
- Maria Aurora von Königsmarck, Swedish noblewoman
- Maria Aurora Couto, Indian writer
- Maria Aurora Uggla, Swedish lady-in-waiting
- Maria Aurora Lopes, São Toméan politician
- Maria Aurora von Spiegel, mistress of Augustus II the Strong
- Maria Aurora (writer), Portuguese writer (1937–2010)

== Places ==
- Maria Aurora, Aurora, municipality in the Philippines
  - Maria Aurora National High School
