= San Luis, Aurora =

Municipality in Aurora, Philippines

San Luis
- Municipality
- Municipality of San Luis
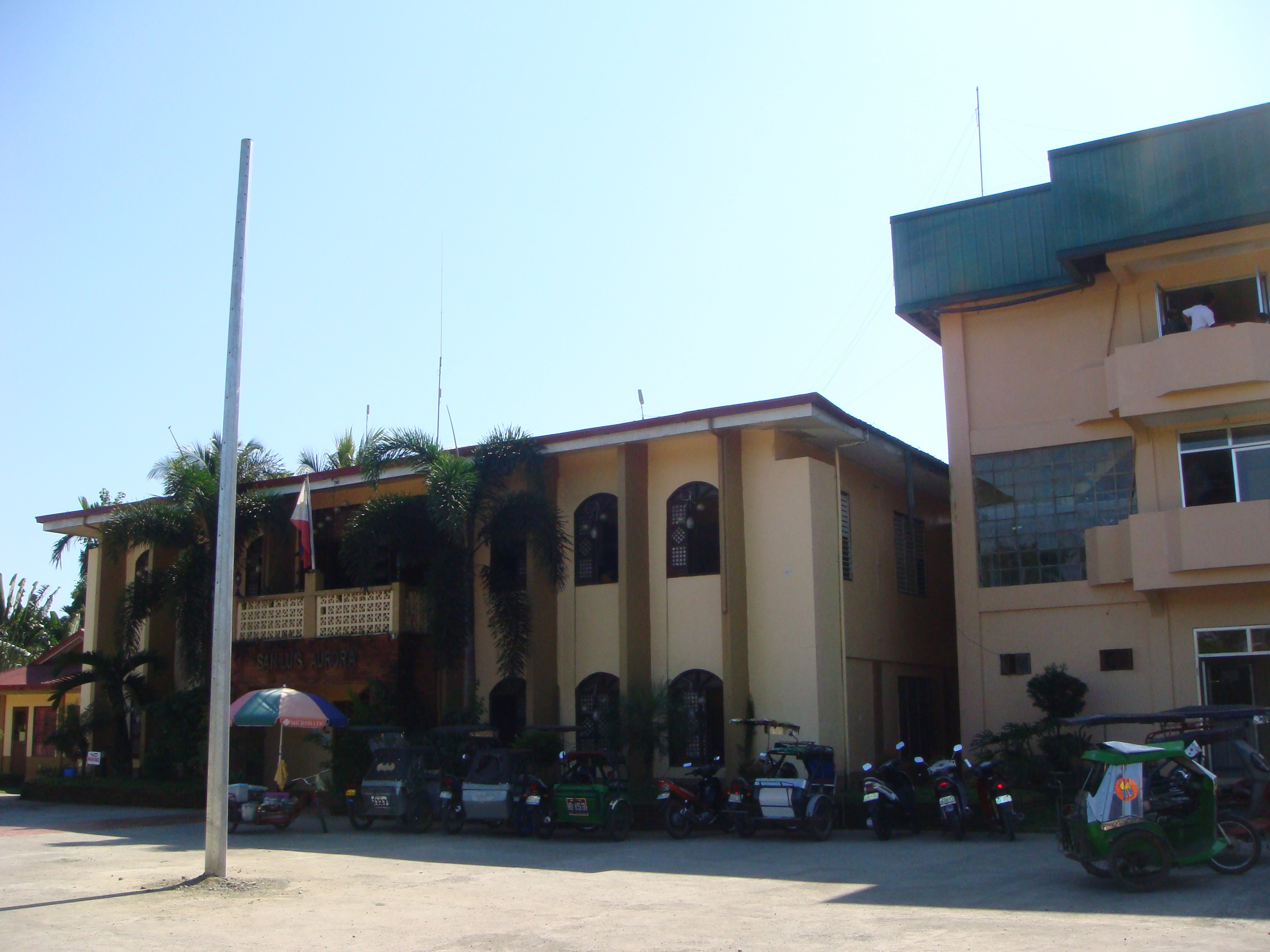
- Municipal Hall

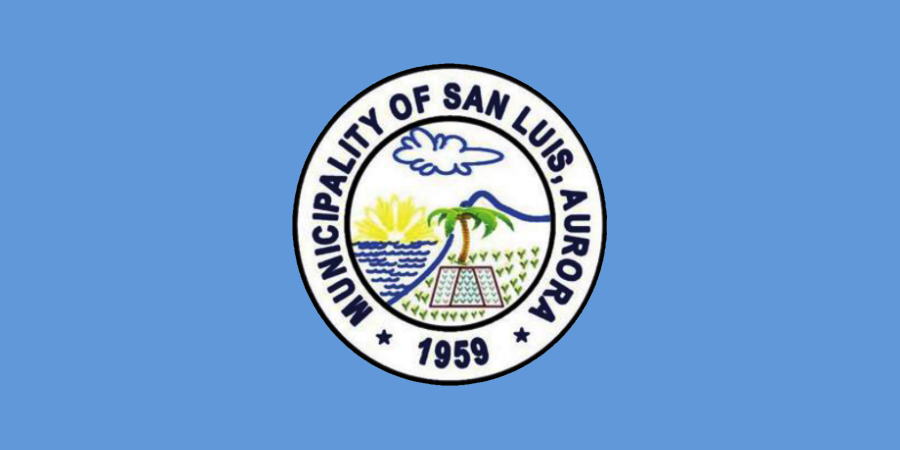
- Flag

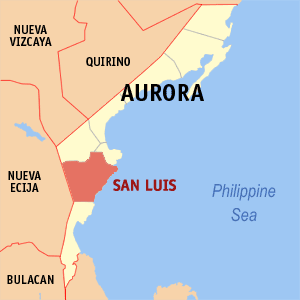
- Map of Aurora with San Luis highlighted
- Interactive map of San Luis
- Location within the Philippines
- Coordinates: 15°43′N 121°31′E
- Country: Philippines
- Region: Central Luzon
- Province: Aurora
- District: Lone district
- Founded: June 21, 1959
- Conversion to municipality: June 16, 1962
- Named for: Saint Louis, King of France
- Barangays: 18 (see Barangays)

Government
  - Type: Sangguniang Bayan
  - Mayor: Ariel A. de Jesus
  - Vice Mayor: Tristan Eric O. Pimentel
  - Representative: Rommel Rico T. Angara
  - Municipal Council: Members: Tristan Eric O. Pimentel; Francisco C. Maliwanag; Claro Q. Olivar; Christopher A. Marzan; Luis B. Pimentel; Lorna B. Cruz; Leonardo B. Amatorio Jr.; Norminda S. Montes
  - Electorate: 20,199 voters (2025)

Area
  - Total: 623.86 km^{2} (240.87 sq mi)
- Elevation: 93 m (305 ft)
- Highest elevation: 805 m (2,641 ft)
- Lowest elevation: 7 m (23 ft)

Population (2024 census)
  - Total: 30,342
  - Density: 48.636/km^{2} (125.97/sq mi)
  - Households: 6,930

Economy
  - Income class: 1st municipal income class
  - Poverty incidence: 12.49% (2023)
  - Revenue: ₱ 296.4 million (2024)
  - Assets: ₱ 934.7 million (2024)
  - Expenditure: ₱ 239.1 million (2024)
  - Liabilities: ₱ 189.4 million (2024)

Service provider
  - Electricity: Aurora Electric Cooperative (AURELCO)
- Time zone: UTC+8 (PST)
- ZIP code: 3201
- PSGC: 0307708000
- IDD : area code: +63 (0)42
- Native languages: Northern Alta; Umiray Dumaget; Tagalog; Ilocano
- Website: www.sanluis-aurora.gov.ph

San Luis, officially the Municipality of San Luis (Tagalog: Bayan ng San Luis; Ilocano: Ili ti San Luis), is a municipality in the province of Aurora, Philippines. According to the 2024 census, it has a population of 30,342 people.

== History ==
Between 1818 and 1902, the Province of Aurora, then a district of "El Principe", Nueva Ecija, consisted only of Baler and Casiguran. The four other existing municipalities were just mission villages like the San Jose de Casecnan (now Maria Aurora), Dipaculao, Dilasag and Ditale, while what is now the municipality of San Luis was a barrio of Baler adjacent to the old barrios of Real, Bacong, Ditumabo and Zarah. It was named after the patron Saint "San Luis Rey de Francia".

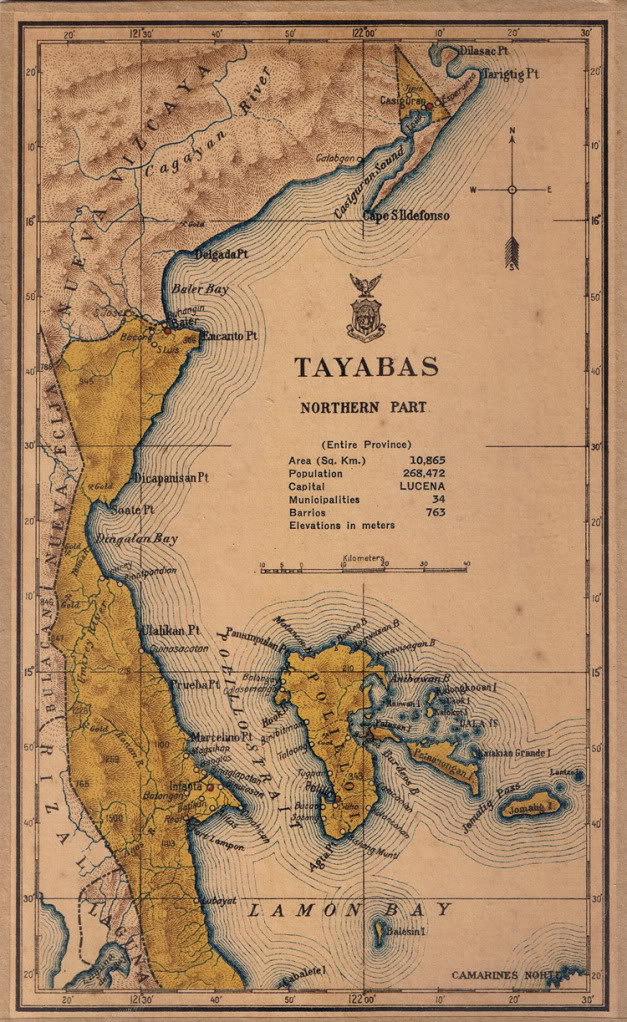
Map of northern Tayabas province (now Quezon) in 1918, showing San Luis as a barrio of Baler

In the Philippine Revolution of 1898, the five barrios became the hot beds of insurgency. The situation was aggravated when the insurrectos attacked the cazadores living in those areas.

On December 9, 1941, the locality suffered heavy casualties when the Japanese Imperial forces bombarded it. This caused the people to flee their homes and settle in nearby mountains of Dibalo and Dicaloyungan. From there, they organized and formed a guerilla group called "205th Squadron" which later became instrumental in liberating the province against the Japanese invading forces by the local Filipino soldiers and the recognized guerrillas in 1945.

In 1945, local Filipino troops of the 3rd, 5th, 52nd, 53rd, 54th, 55th, 56th and 57th Infantry Division of the Philippine Commonwealth Army and 5th Constabulary Regiment of the Philippine Constabulary was liberated in San Luis, Tayabas and helping recognized guerrilla groups of the 205th Squadron Guerrillas to defeat and fight against the Japanese Imperial forces and ended in World War II during the Northern Tayabas Campaign.

The Sub-Province of Aurora was created through the enactment of Republic Act No. 648 on July 14, 1951. This law provides for the creation of other municipalities in the province. Local officials sought the assistance of Representative Manuel S. Enverga of Quezon's 1st district to create a separate municipality comprising the adjacent barrios. Enverga sponsored House Bill No. 2863, which later became Republic Act No. 2452, creating the municipal district of San Luis out of Baler on June 21, 1959. It then consisted of barrios San Luis, Bacong and Ditumabo. It became a regular municipality on June 16, 1962 under the sub-province of Aurora through Republic Act No. 3487. In 1979, it separated from Quezon and became part of the new province of Aurora.

Since its creation, the Municipality of San Luis was governed by elected and appointed municipal mayors.

== Geography ==
San Luis is located in the central portion of Aurora Province, geographically located between east longitudes 121 16’ 00’’ to 121 35’ 00’’ and north latitudes 15 28’ 00’’ to 15’ 42’ 00. The area is bounded on the north by the municipality of Maria Aurora, on the south by Dingalan, on the east by Baler (capital of the province), and the province of Nueva Ecija on the west.

According to the Philippine Statistics Authority, the municipality has a land area of 623.86 square kilometers (240.87 sq mi) constituting 19.82% of the 3,147.32-square-kilometer- (1,215.19 sq mi) total area of Aurora. About 87% of the municipality's land area is under hills and mountains, while the remaining 13% is lowlands.

San Luis is situated 8.09 kilometres (5.03 mi) from the provincial capital Baler, and 265.84 kilometres (165.19 mi) from the country's capital city of Manila.

=== Land classification ===
San Luis is classified into (2) major land classification: forestlands, and alienable and disposable lands. Forestlands cover 53,443.78 hectares (132,062.5 acres) or 85.67% of the total land area of the municipality, while 7,706.39 hectares (19,042.9 acres) (12.35%) are classified alienable and disposable lands. The former is further classified into timberland (26,718.93 ha or 66,023.9 acres), national park (1,745.59 ha or 4,313.4 acres), watershed forest reservation (14,013.76 ha or 34,628.8 acres) and integrated social forestry (966 ha or 2,390 acres), integrated forest management agreement (918 ha or 2,270 acres) and certificate of ancestral domain claimed areas (10,900 ha or 27,000 acres).

Miscellaneous land types consist of built-up are beach sand and river wash area. Built–up areas are found in the Poblacion and barangay centers, while river wash and beach sand are found along the Diteki River and portions of barangay Dibayabay, respectively. Miscellaneous land types cover an aggregate area of 383 hectares (950 acres) or 0.61% of the total land area of San Luis.

=== Barangays ===
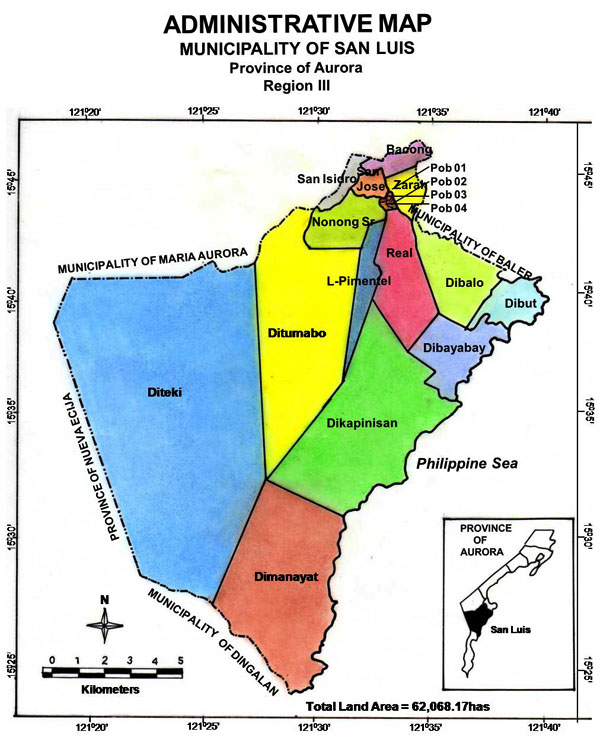
Political subdivisions

San Luis is politically subdivided into 18 barangays. Each barangay consists of puroks and some have sitios.

PSGC	Barangay	Population			±% p.a.	
		2024		2010		
037708001	Bacong	5.8%	1,773	1,723	▴	0.20%
037708002	Barangay I (Poblacion)	1.2%	368	406	▾	−0.68%
037708003	Barangay II (Poblacion)	2.5%	756	763	▾	−0.06%
037708004	Barangay III (Poblacion)	2.4%	730	640	▴	0.92%
037708005	Barangay IV (Poblacion)	4.3%	1,301	1,218	▴	0.46%
037708006	Dibalo	0.5%	137	156	▾	−0.90%
037708007	Dibayabay	3.9%	1,177	1,152	▴	0.15%
037708008	Dibut	3.0%	909	856	▴	0.42%
037708009	Dikapinisan	7.1%	2,159	2,035	▴	0.41%
037708010	Dimanayat	4.1%	1,243	1,149	▴	0.55%
037708011	Diteki	5.2%	1,573	1,432	▴	0.65%
037708012	Ditumabo	11.5%	3,485	3,318	▴	0.34%
037708013	L. Pimentel	3.5%	1,074	914	▴	1.13%
037708014	Nonong Senior	14.1%	4,278	3,892	▴	0.66%
037708015	Real	4.0%	1,228	1,100	▴	0.77%
037708016	San Isidro	7.2%	2,171	1,906	▴	0.91%
037708017	San Jose	1.8%	541	488	▴	0.72%
037708018	Zarah	8.1%	2,449	2,128	▴	0.98%
	Total		30,342	25,276	▴	1.28%

=== Topography ===
San Luis is generally rugged and mountainous. About 63% of its total land area is considered moderately high-to-high elevation highlands exceeding 500 metres (1,600 ft) above sea level. The rest of the area or 37% is less than 500 meters. The elevation ranges from 0 to 1,885 metres (6,184 ft) above sea level.

=== Climate ===
Climate data for San Luis, Aurora
Month	Jan	Feb	Mar	Apr	May	Jun	Jul	Aug	Sep	Oct	Nov	Dec	Year
Mean daily maximum °C (°F)	27 (81)	28 (82)	29 (84)	32 (90)	32 (90)	31 (88)	30 (86)	30 (86)	30 (86)	30 (86)	29 (84)	27 (81)	30 (85)
Mean daily minimum °C (°F)	20 (68)	20 (68)	21 (70)	23 (73)	24 (75)	24 (75)	24 (75)	24 (75)	24 (75)	23 (73)	22 (72)	21 (70)	23 (72)
Average precipitation mm (inches)	25 (1.0)	26 (1.0)	18 (0.7)	24 (0.9)	91 (3.6)	145 (5.7)	149 (5.9)	122 (4.8)	120 (4.7)	128 (5.0)	61 (2.4)	52 (2.0)	961 (37.7)
Average rainy days	7.7	5.7	6.8	8.0	18.2	22.1	24.3	23.4	22.7	17.5	10.0	9.4	175.8
Source: Meteoblue (modeled/calculated data, not measured locally)

San Luis falls under the Type IV climate of the Corona Classification with no distinct dry and wet seasons. Significant rainfall of greater than 150 millimetres (5.9 in) generally occurs in every month.

=== Geology/geomorphology ===
San Luis is composed of three major landscapes. These are the: alluvial landscape, foothill landscape and mountain landscape.

- Alluvial: The alluvial landscape was formed by the accumulation of eroded and transported recent alluvial sediments consisting of an assemblage of sub-angular to rounded gravels, pebbles and boulders as well as fine materials (sand, silt and clay). The thickness ranges from 1 to 50 meters deep in places. These include swamps (tree type), broad alluvial plains, river terraces and collu-alluvial fans. These landforms are found at the mid-northern portion (lowland area) of the municipality as well as areas along the downstream portions of rivers dissecting the central lowland areas of the municipality's coastal barangays of Dibut, Dibayabay, Dikapinisan and Dimanayat.
- Foothill: The foothill landscape comprises hills and foothills. It is found between the lowland and forestland areas of the municipality. The majority of this landscape are found along coastal barangays of San Luis, Ditumabo, L. Pimentel, Real, and Dibalo. These are categorized severely dissected high volcanic and metamorphic hills with rolling to very steep slopes. The foothill landscape was formed through volcanic uplift and subsequent tensional forces and compression whose surface configuration has eventually been carried out by erosion, landslide, rock fall faulting folding soil creeping and deepening of water channels. The elevation ranges from 50 to 500 meters above sea level. It was a mixed lithology of four different rocks formation dated from Miocene to Recent. These are the Oligocene-Miocene (NI), Basement Complex (BC), Meta-volcanic (Kv), undifferentiated (Kpg), Cretaceous Paleocene (Ue), and Recent. Igneous and metamorphic rocks dominate the rocks formation and with composition that includes basalt, gabbro, ultrabasic, volcanic breccia, greywackes, peridotite, andesitic lava, metamorphosed shale, quarts, feldspar, slate, amphibolite, and phyllite.

The mountains of San Luis

- Mountain: Landforms of mountain landscape were formed and developed through violent upliftment and subsequent movement, frequent rising by strong tensional forces and compression as well as volcanic activity and other forces. The elevation ranges from 500 to 1,885 meters above sea level this landscape was shaped by erosion, gravity, rock falls, landslides, and tensional forces, faulting, folding and deepening of streams. The lithology was a mixed formed during the Jurassic to cretaceous Paleocene age. These are the Meta-volcanics and Basement Complex. The major kinds of rocks found in the formation are Igneous and metamorphic.

Igneous rocks were formed from cooling liquid magma, and subsequently solidified on or near the atmosphere (volcanic or extrusive). These are found at the mid-western portion of the municipality (Dupinga) as well as on the south-eastern boundary of San Luis with the municipality of Dingalan. These rocks are composed of basalt, andesite, greywackes and breccia.

Metamorphic rocks are altered rocks from sedimentary and igneous origin and are formed due to intense pressure and temperature. Their composition includes amphibolites, quartz feldspar, Phyllites and slate. Metamorphic rocks are largely found at the western and eastern portion of the municipality (mountainous areas facing the Pacific Ocean).

=== Soils/physiography ===
Four hypsographic units were identified in the municipality of San Luis: lowland soils, upland soils, soils of the hills, and mountain soils. These hypsographic units are further sub-divided into fourteen (14) major land Management Units and three miscellaneous land types 9.

- Lowland Soils: Lowland soils are considered young and formed from fluvio-marine sediments and alluvial materials. These soils are found in areas categorized as broad-alluvial plains, collu-alluvial fans, river terraces and swamps.

Broad-alluvial plains have slopes of flat to almost flat, well to poorly drained, with fine loamy to clayey soil textures, moderately deep to very deep soils, no apparent erosion, and none (095,09k) to severely (09LI) flooded. These alluvial plains occupy the mid-northern portions of the municipality including the lowland areas of coastal barangays-Dibut, Dibayabay, Dikapinisan and Dimanayat. A total of 4,396 hectares (10,860 acres) or 7% of the municipality land area is broad alluvial plains cover land area.

Collu–alluvial fans are flat to almost flat (0-8% slopes) land, moderately to well drain areas, fine loamy to clayey soil texture, shallow to very deep soils, none to moderately eroded and no flooding. These areas are found in barangay Ditumabo and Nonong Sr. with an extent of 520 hectares (1,300 acres).

River terraces are areas with slopes of 0 to 3% (flat to almost flat), moderately to well drain soils, fine loamy to clayey soil textures, moderately deep soils, no apparent erosion and flooding. These areas are found in barangays Diteki and Ditumabo along the Diteki River. Around 384 hectares (950 acres) or 0.7% of the municipalities land area is covered by this landform.

At the mid-northern portion of the municipality is a swampy area vegetated by a mixture of trees. The soil of this area is poorly drained, fine loamy texture, moderately deep, no apparent erosion, and usually experience severe flooding. Swamps cover a total of 148 hectares (370 acres) but the progressive conversion of this area into rice cultivation reduces is coverage.

- Upland Soils: Upland soils are found on slightly to severely dissected lowland, high volcanic and metamorphic hills. These soils have complex smooth and sharp ridges, undulating to very steep slopes, clayey to fine loamy textures, well drained, shallow to moderately slightly to moderately erode, and no flooding. A total of 15,886 hectares (39,260 acres) or 26% of the municipality's total land area is covered by upland soils.
- Mountain Soils: The mountainous portions of the municipality are described moderately to severely dissected metamorphic (131P & 131 O/RA) and complex volcanic mountains (137 O/RA) moderate to overly steep slopes, well drained soils, clayey soil textures, shallow to moderately deep soils, slightly (131P) to severely eroded (131 Q/RA & 137 Q/RA) soils and no flooding. Mountain soils cover about 38,131 hectares (94,220 acres) or 63% of the municipality's total land area.

== Demographics ==
Population census of San Luis
Year	Pop.	±% p.a.
1960	4,397	—
1970	8,090	+6.28%
1975	11,515	+7.34%
1980	11,828	+0.54%
1990	16,740	+3.53%
1995	20,947	+4.29%
2000	21,256	+0.31%
2007	23,766	+1.55%
2010	25,276	+2.27%
2015	27,352	+1.51%
2020	29,824	+1.84%
2024	30,342	+0.41%
Source: Philippine Statistics Authority

In the 2024 census, San Luis had a population of 30,342 people. The population density was 49 inhabitants per square kilometre (130/sq mi).

The dominant ethnicities of the population are Tagalog and Ilocano. Comparing the 2000 and 2007 population count, there was an increase of 2,510 or about 10.56%. The average annual growth rate in the area is 1.68%.

Normally, population density is presented by taking into consideration the population and the total land area of the place. Since population of the Barangays of the municipality of San Luis is characterized by being sited mostly on lowlands (A&D) and partially in forestland, it was decided to present population density both based on the total land area and estimated inhabited area. The latter will provide a more realistic figure for population density as the majority of the Barangay population are living on the lowlands.

The population densities of the municipality, based on total area and estimated inhabited area, are 37.66 and 307 persons per square kilometer, respectively.

Of the recorded 4,548 households of San Luis based on Barangay Health Worker's record with Barangay Nonong Sr. had the most number with 750 households, and Barangay Dibalo having the least number with only 32 households. The average household size in the municipality is 6.

=== Housing ===
San Luis is dominated by single house type numbering 4,411 units. Barangay Ditumabo had the most of this housing type with 589 units, while the least number is found in Barangay Dibalo with 37 units. Duplex housing type on the other hand, numbers 84 units, of which 35 units are found in Barangay Diteki.

The municipality has provided various housing assistance projects in cooperation with various agencies such as Gawad Kalinga, CAVA Habitat for Humanity, TRANSDEN, and DSWDO.

For buildings, a total of 589 have been identified, 202 of which are institutional where all barangays has at least one, 186 commercial mostly sari-sari stores, 182 industrials, and 19 agricultural buildings.

== Economy ==
Poverty incidence of San Luis (%)

Source: Philippine Statistics Authority

The main forms of livelihood in San Luis are farming and fishing. The major crops are coconut, palay, citrus, pineapple, rootcrops and other fruits. Products made by cottage industries include sabutan crafts and other handicrafts.

=== Agriculture ===
Active agricultural lands cover more than 6,865.05 hectares (16,963.9 acres) or about 11 percent of the municipality's total land areas. The rest are planted to citrus, coffee, banana, corn, ube, sweet potato, ginger, pineapple, etc.

There are six existing agricultural farming structures in the municipality. These include staple crop farms (857.68 ha or 2,119.4 acres), coconut intercropping farm (4,773.53 ha or 11,795.6 acres), hybrid yellow corn (35.0 ha or 86 acres), orchard farm (1,132.32 ha or 2,798.0 acres), vegetable farm (21.52 ha or 53.2 acres), and root crops farm (45.0 ha or 111 acres) with total area coverage of 6,865.05 hectares (16,963.9 acres).

There are two fertilizers, one pesticide dealer, and four certified seed growers in the municipality. In 2007, the municipality had a total of 103 post-harvest facilities and agricultural equipment machineries. Of this, 30 are solar dryers/concrete pavements, 16 threshers, 38 hand tractors, 7 rice mills, 10 warehouse and 2 mechanical dryers. All 18 barangays of the municipality has solar dryers with Bacong having the most number with 7.

The majority of palay produced by farmers of San Luis is milled and sold either wholesale or retail to buyers which in turn transport these outside the province. There are fifty (50) registered rice dealers, forty-four (44) retailers and six wholesalers are found in the municipality.

Farmers in the municipality practice two cropping systems. These are the coconut-based and rice based cropping systems. The coconut–based cropping systems cover an area of 5,793.53 hectares (14,316.1 acres). These were 4,161.03 ha (10,282.1 acres) mono-cropped coconut, 259 ha (640 acres) of coconut-pasture/livestock multi-storey system, and 1,373.53 ha (3,394.1 acres) of multiple cropping. On the other hand, rice-based cropping systems followed an irrigated mono-cropping system and multiple cropping systems.

=== Forestry ===
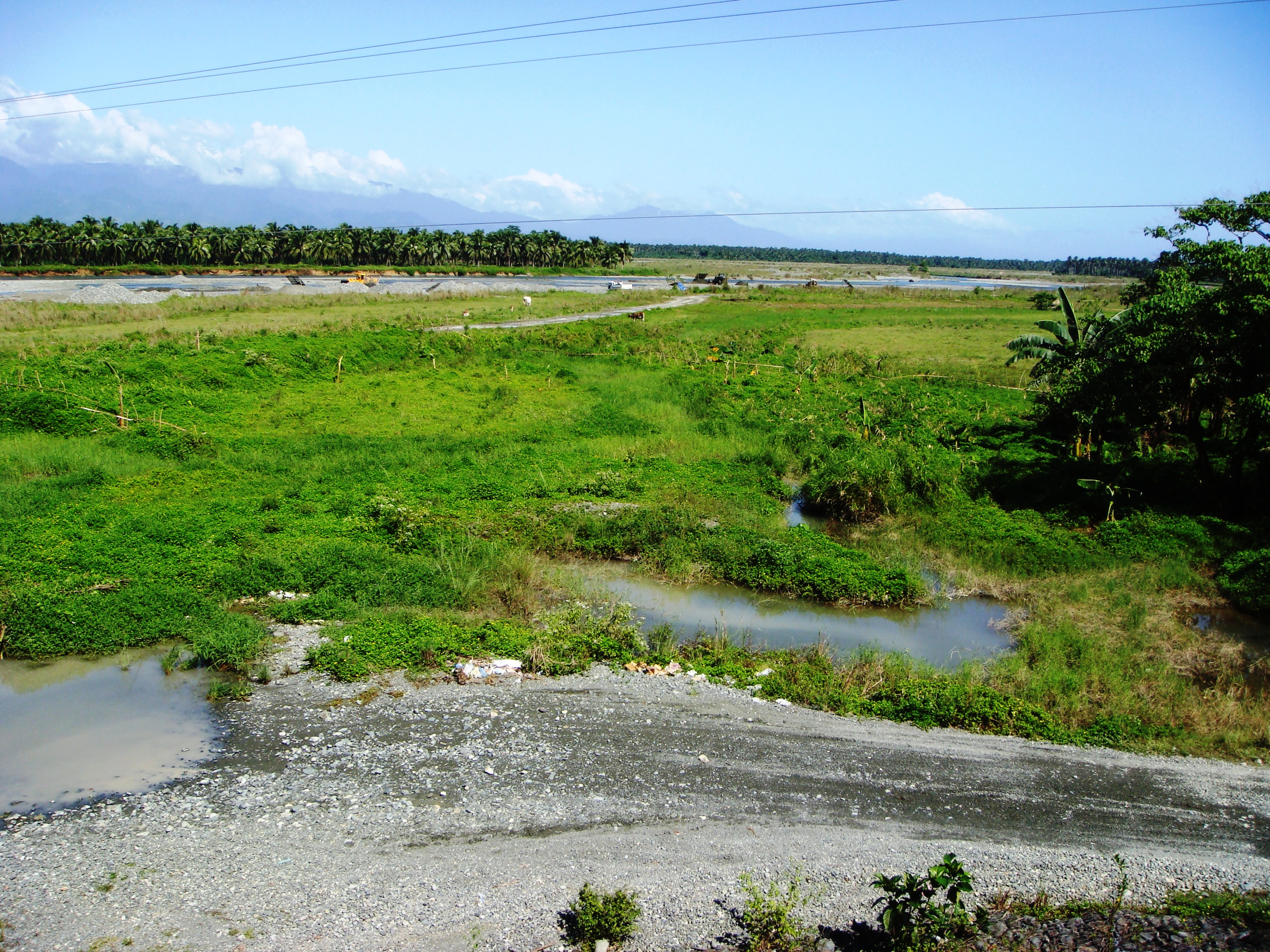
Diteki River Watershed Forest Reserve

- Forest Resources: The municipality has the largest woodland area among the eight municipalities of the province. About 48,738 ha or 78% of its total land area are classified forest. Of this total forest cover, 5,058 ha are Virgin Forest (Dp 31 & Dp 32), 28,043 ha, Residual Forest (Dp2), 811 ha Sub- marginal Forest (SM), and 14,826 ha Mossy Forest (MO).
- Other minor forest products found in the forestlands of San Luis include hagnaya, nito, rattan, sabutan, coco-midrib, banban and lukmoy. These minor forest products are growing abundantly in the area and are major sources of raw materials for the production of various handy crafts.
- Wildlife Resources: The biologically rich Sierra Madre Mountain covers a large segment of the land area of the municipality of San Luis. Various species of birds, including the Philippine Eagle (Pithecophaga Jefferyi) were observe and identified in the area (Philippine Biodiversity Inventory, 1997). Wild animals such as wild boars, deer, monkeys, etc. also thrive in the area.
- Watershed Resources: There were 70 watershed groups composed of 303 individual watersheds identified in the province of Aurora. Of this number, eleven are found within the municipality of San Luis. Portions of some of these watersheds are found within the neighboring municipalities of Baler, Maria Aurora and Dingalan.
- About 53% of the watersheds of San Luis have slopes of more than 50%, The watersheds with the largest and smallest area of more than 50% slopes are Dibut and Dibalo/Pingit/Zabali/Malayat, respectively. In terms of forest cover, the municipality has an average forest cover of 67%. The most forest-depleted watersheds are that of Dibalo/Pingit/Malayat and San Luis, while with still good forest cover (90%) are Dimanayat and Dikapinisan watersheds.

Hill farming activities are found in these watersheds. Logging roads density is high. The most dense watersheds in terms of the presence of logging roads are Dikapinisan watershed.

The watersheds of Diteki, Dikapinisan, Watershed no. 56, and Dikapinisan has an average critical watershed index of 0.34, meaning the erosion levels, deforestation, hill farming and logging roads combined indicate a relatively low risk of environmental damage. The rest of the watersheds are classified under the moderately low risk to cause environmental damage in the short-term.

=== Fisheries ===
==== Inland fishing ====
Of the 18 Barangays in San Luis, only ten have been recorded with aquaculture activities. There are 34 freshwater fishponds with a total area of 247 hectares. Majority (18) of the fishponds are located in the Barangay Nonong Sr. with a total area of 0.397 hectare.

The native species of Tilapia is the main fish cultured in the municipality. The fish are known to be the slow grower and have low feed conversion ratio. There are also cases of unintentional presence of other fish species like catfish and mudfish.

==== Municipal and sustenance fishing ====
There are a total of 300 fishermen in four coastal barangays of San Luis considered with the sustenance level as they operate on small scale. A total of 20 fishermen derive their income mainly from fishing while 280 are considered part-time fishermen and engaged in other economic activities such as farming.

There are 194 fishing boats in the area. These are 62 motorized and 92 non-motorized boats. The estimated annual production was 99.84 metric tons, broken down to 59.90 MT and 39.94 MT for motorized and non-motorized boats respectively.

With regards to the type of fishing gears, the majority of the fisherman uses hook and the line type. The species caught using this type are frigate tunas, big eye scads, yellow fin tunas, pacific sailfish groupers, Spanish mackerels and slip mouth, round scads, maya-maya, flying fish, bumo and saray. Other types gears used are spear guns, gillnets and the casting net. The municipality of San Luis together with BFAR has provided payaos to fisherman association of coastal barangays to increase fish catch of fisherman.

=== Home/cottage industries ===
Different types of cottage industries exist in the municipality. The following are: sabutan craft, furniture making, bricks and pottery making, basketry rattan craft, charcoal making, hollow blocks making, iron/steel foundry, native wine and vinegar processing, meat processing, salted egg making, bukayo making, abaca production and dairy production.

The most home and cottage industry operators are engaged in sabutan craft producing various designs of hats, mats, placemat and other accessories. The operators are mostly women. Raw materials are readily available and the market outlets for finished products are sold locally and abroad.

Narra and rattan furniture are produced for local market. Currently, there are five furniture-making establishments in the town. Though supply of raw materials of narra and rattan are now becoming scarce, still this business is lucrative for it gives significant income to the furniture makers and gatherers of raw materials.

Pottery making is one of the potential business opportunities in the municipality because of the availability of raw materials (clay soil and used rubber tires) and its marketability. Currently, there is a brick and pottery business in barangay Diteki under the management of DA-LGU. It produces different kinds of pots and bricks intended for local markets in central Aurora.

Food processing industries such as meat processing, bukayo making, salted-egg making, vinegar making are also source of livelihood in the municipality. Raw materials for both products are readily available in the municipality. Products of these enterprises are marketed locally and in adjacent provinces, including Metro Manila.

The above-mentioned industries are sources of livelihood for a considerable number of the population and considered as one of the factors in the municipality's economic growth.

Ditumabo Falls

== Attractions ==
Tourist spots include Caunayan Falls, beaches, Danayag and Maaling-aling Trek.

The existing Aurora Memorial National Park, the only legally proclaimed park in the Province of Aurora, is partly within the jurisdiction of the municipality of San Luis. This park is rich in biodiversity, and the Philippine Eagle has been sighted in the place several times. These birds are believed to stay in the most remote sections of the park.

== Infrastructure and utilities ==
=== Irrigation ===
The municipality has four existing Communal Irrigation Systems (CIS), five Communal Irrigation Projects, and one National Irrigation System. These irrigation systems have an aggregate service area of 631 hectares and farmer beneficiaries of 681 farmers. Of the total service area and farmer beneficiaries, the NIS, CIS, and CIPs serve and benefit 252 hectares and 247 farmers, 98 hectares and 82 farmers respectively.

These irrigation infrastructure facilities are support strategy mechanism to the Agricultural and Fisheries Modernization Act of 1997 (R.A 8435). The main objective of which is to modernize the agriculture and fishery sectors in order to enhance their profitability and prepare said sectors for the challenges of globalization through an adequate focused and rational delivery of necessary support services and funds.

=== Transportation ===
==== Land ====
San Luis is accessible via the Baler-Bongabon Road that crosses the Sierra Madre Mountain Range and links the municipality with the province of Nueva Ecija. Portions of this road, from Poblacion to Barangay Diteki proper, are paved. Adjacent barangays are inter-connected by roads.

There are 104 kilometers (65 mi) of roads in the municipality of San Luis (excluding logging roads). These are classified into national, provincial, municipal and barangay roads with lengths of 54.8 kilometers (34.1 mi), 8.2 kilometers (5.1 mi), 5.4 kilometers (3.4 mi), and 35.6 kilometers (22.1 mi), respectively. The most common road type is gravel road accounting for 86% of the total length of road network. Bituminous road come second (12%), followed by concrete. The road network of the municipality is found extensively at the Poblacion and radiated to some peripheral barangays. The coastal barangays are not accessible via land transport.

The common means of transportation in the municipality are tricycles with total number of 172 registered units. Other means of land transportation are bicycles, handtractor, motorcycles, bull cart, vans and cars. The Sierra Madre and the Genesis Bus Companies service the town. Passenger jeeps complement these bus companies.

==== Bridges ====
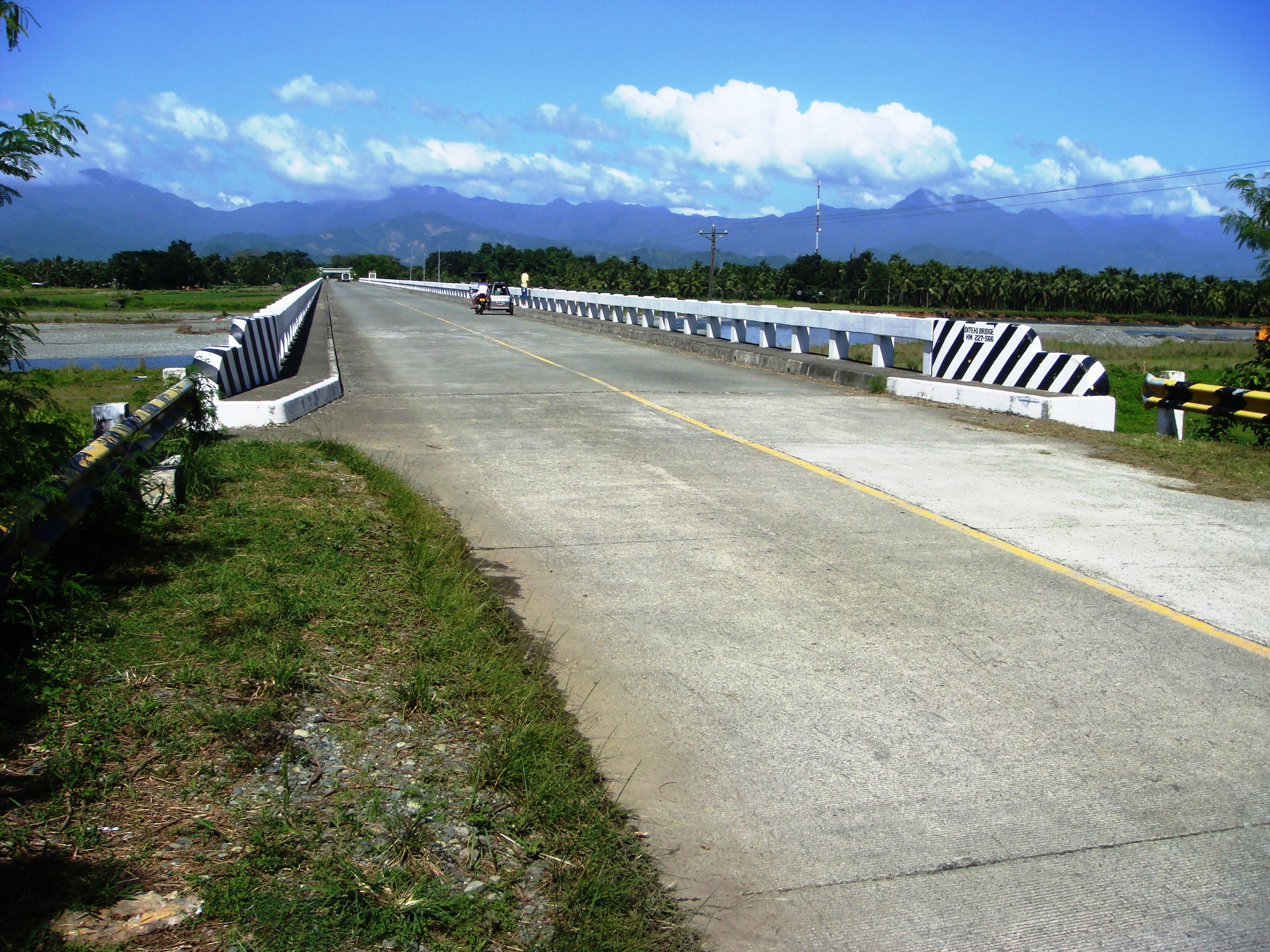
Diteki Bridge

The municipality has seven existing (7) bridges. These have a combined length of 340 linear meters. These bridges are classified into national (6) and municipal (1) with lengths of 332 and 8 linear meters, respectively. Most of the national bridges are made of concrete and only one is made of steel.

==== Air ====
The Dr. Juan C. Angara Airport, San Luis' municipal airport, is located in barangay San Isidro. There is now a regular flight of SeaAir coming and going to Manila twice a week. The airport is limited to small type of planes which the runway is intended for.

==== Water ====
There are 102 registered motorized fishing boats, 92 non-motorized fishing boats and 40 passenger/cargo boats are means of transportation in coastal barangays of the municipality though there is no regular schedule of travels due to unpredictable weather condition of the said area.

=== Water supply facilities ===
The domestic water supply in San Luis relies mainly on ground water either indirectly in the form of spring flows or directly from wells and water pumps servicing the 4,548 households of the municipality. Other sources of potable water are pumps, springs, free flows, and wells.

Some barangays such as Barangay Poblacion, Diteki and Ditumabo are already enjoying piped- in water supply whose water source is from spring developments with mainline pipes connected where smaller pipes are attached and distributed to different households.

=== Telecommunication and postal services ===
The telecommunication services in the municipality mostly are cellular phones with Smart and Globe as service provider. Single side band radios are also available but mostly it's privately owned or used by military personnel. There is also internet service now in the municipality with Smart Broadband as provider.

Postal service facility is located in the Municipal Hall. The delivery efficiency of the Municipal post office is however limited considering only one personnel staffed it. Postal delivery services cover only barangays surrounding the Poblacion.

=== Power supply facilities ===
The electric power supply of the 17 of 18 barangay in municipality comes from the Aurora Electric Company's (AURELCO) 69 KV sub-station through the Bongabon area. It has a total capacity of 5 Mega volts Ampere (MVA) stationed in Barangay San Isidro. 94% of the household on the said 17 barangays are already energized.

Barangay Dimanayat has a 5 KW Micro-Hydro Project which provides its electricity. This project is by the Municipality of San Luis is with counterpart from the Central Luzon State University Affiliated Non-Conventional Energy Center (CLSU-ANEC) and Barangay Dimanayat.

San Luis Mini-Hydro Power Plant is operationalized since June 2013 and one of the other income generating project of the municipality with minimum capacity of 400 kilowatts. Currently, its income supports to the power consumption of its constituents thru power subsidies.

=== Flood control and drainage ===
There are four flood control and drainage structure in the municipality. These are located in barangay Diteki, Ditumabo, Nonong Sr. San Isidro and Brgy Dibalo. The major rivers of the municipality are commonly experiencing riverbanks erosion, which are attributed to loose young soil materials (alluvial), and large volume of floodwaters with high velocity. Some sections of these rivers require additional flood control structures.

== Social services ==
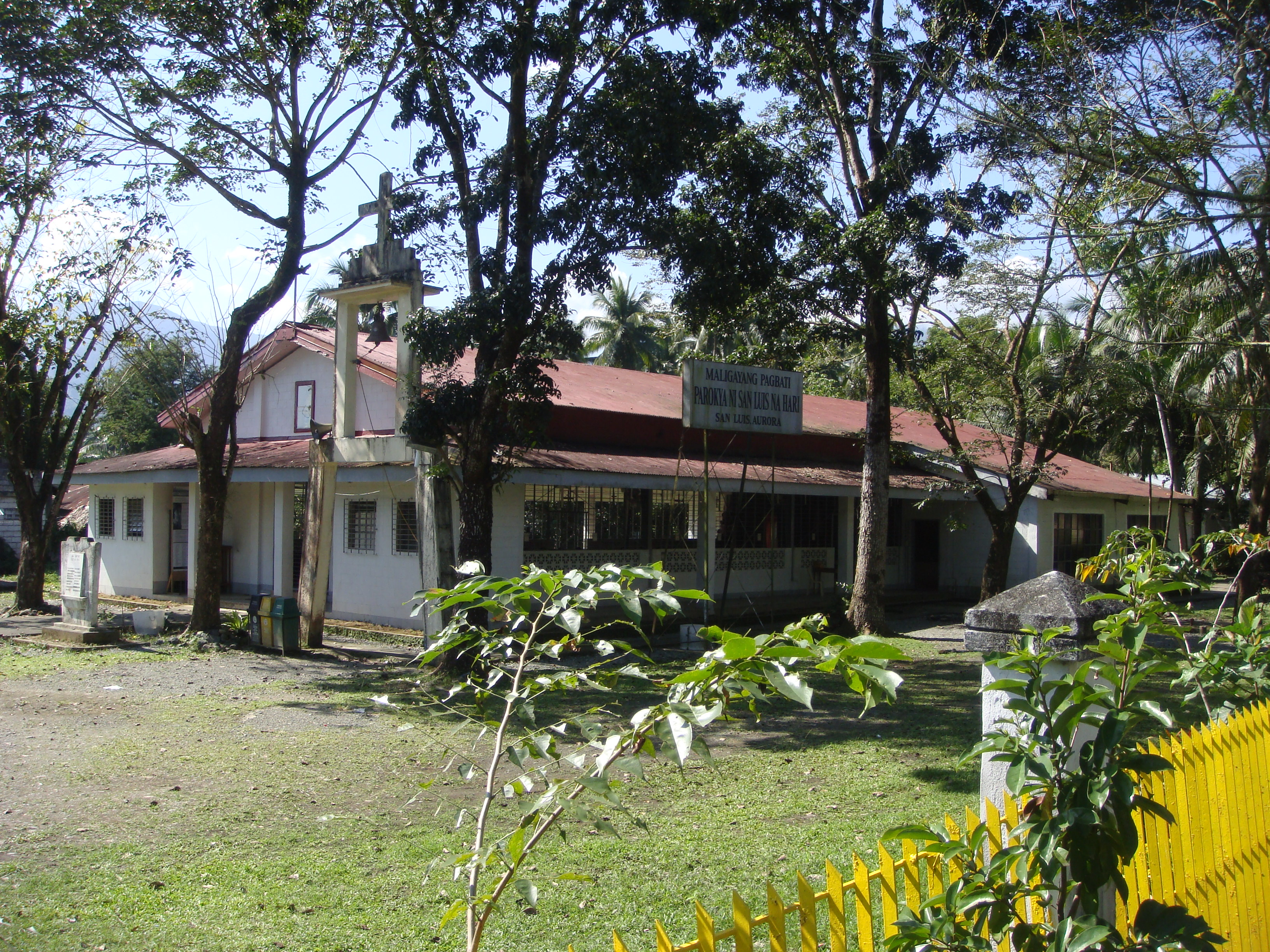
San Luis' Parish Church

=== Health ===
There are fifteen Barangay Health Stations (BHS) and one Health Nutrition Post in the municipality of San Luis Luis. The Rosauro R. Tangson Memorial Clinic – RHU in Barangay 02 offer basic services to its adjacent barangays. Both the RHU and Barangay Health Stations dispense basic health care services like reproductive health program, dental and eye care program, child health and maternal care, lying-in and maternity clinic, Philhealth para sa Masa, treatment of simple medical condition, nutrition, sanitary health care, emergency treatment, and health education.

There are 21 health personnel employed scattered in all Barangay Health Station and Nutrition Post in the municipality. The RHU has physician, dentist, nurse, medical technologist, and midwives. There are also 156 active Barangay Health Workers and 12 trained traditional midwives which also help providing health services in the municipality.

==== Morbidity and mortality ====
The most common cause of morbidity in the municipality is upper respiratory infection with 673 reported cases. Other leading causes of morbidity are malnutrition, skin problems, pneumonia, hypertension and diarrhea..

Cardiovascular Disease is the leading cause of deaths in the area with 17. For infants mortality, the dreaded disease were congenital abnormalities, dystocia of pregnancy, aspiration pneumonia and hyaline membrane disease..

==== Nutritional status ====
The operation Timbang that was conducted in 2007 for children of the municipality revealed that the majority 86.747% or 2,919 have normal weights. Recorded underweight children had a total of 405 or 12.63% of those who underwent operation Timbang.

=== Recreational facilities ===
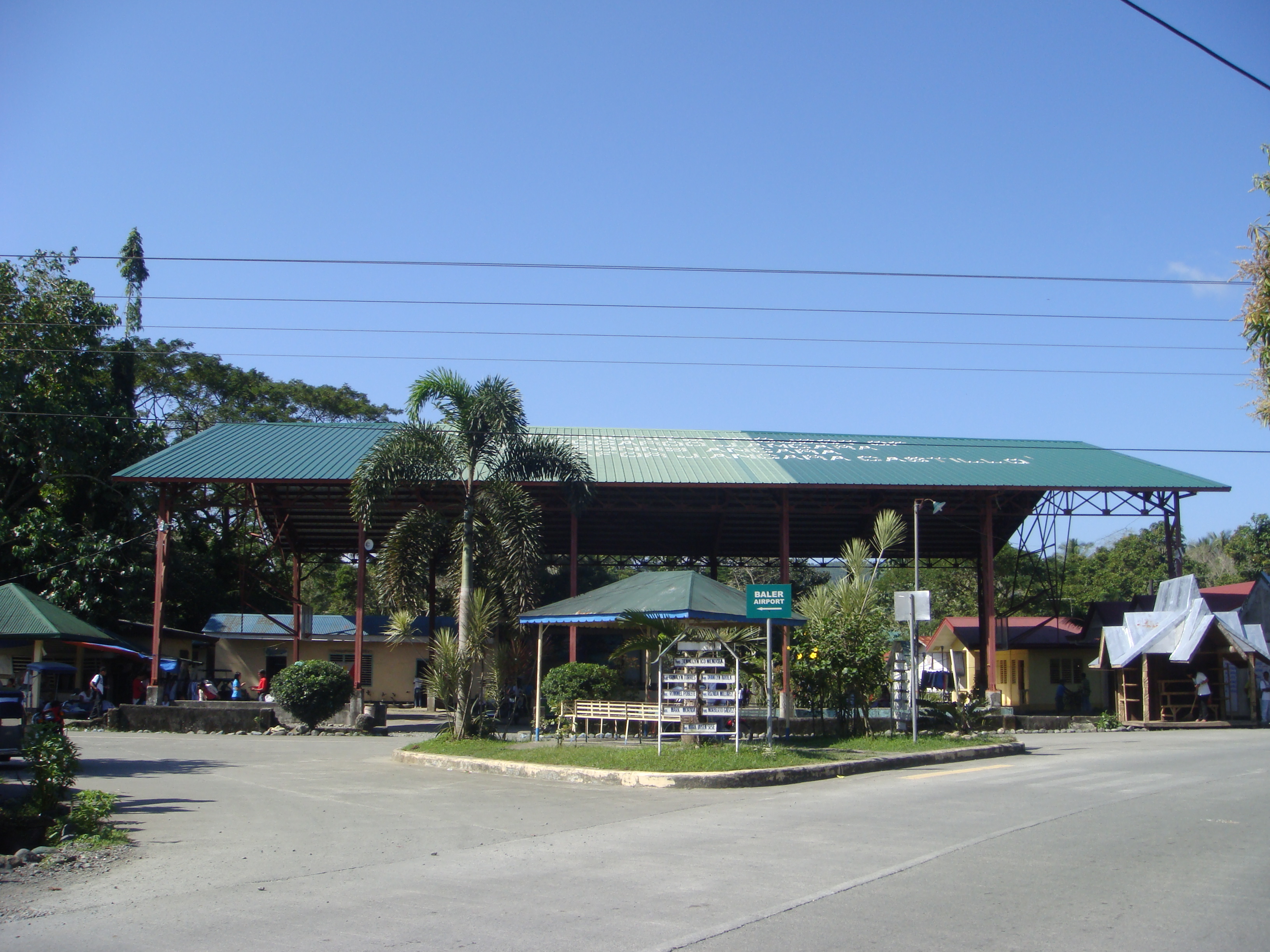
Covered courts and junction (Barangay San Isidro)

Residents of San Luis have an access to different recreational facilities such as basketball courts, volleyball courts, billiard hall, computer shops, and many others.

=== Protective services ===
San Luis has a police station found within the Municipal Hall compound and staffed by police officers who maintain peace and order situation on town, particularly the Poblacion.

There are 28 police officers assigned in the municipality. Though the standard police to population ratio is not being met, the present peace and order situation of the municipality is generally peaceful and under level with the incidence of crime index is only 0.088% and incidence of non-index crime is only 0.016%.

The municipality has one municipal fire station located in Barangay 01. The Municipal Fire Brigade maintains one fire truck and is prepared for fire fighting and emergency rescue. There are currently seven active fire officials in San Luis.

== Education ==
The San Luis Schools District Office governs all educational institutions within the municipality. It oversees the management and operations of all private and public, from primary to secondary schools. There are 1 primary, 18 elementary, and 4 secondary schools in San Luis.

The population of San Luis has an 84 percent literacy rate. In terms of literacy by barangay population, San Isidro has the highest literacy rate with 91%. The high literacy rate is attributed to the high enrollment participation rate. The total enrollment in all school levels was 4,068 which is equivalent to 87% participation rate.

The two types of school level in the municipality of San Luis are elementary and secondary schools. Elementary is further classified into primary Grades I-III and intermediate Grades I-VI. The intermediate grades have 18 school sites in 18 barangays of the Municipality. There are total of 126 classrooms for intermediate grades with teaching force of 125 teachers. There is only one primary school in the municipality which is a private one. On the other hand, there are four secondary schools facilities with 58 teachers and classrooms numbering of 41.

The municipality of San Luis has provided 2 extension class rooms with 4 extension class teachers funded out by the Municipal Special Education Fund last School Year to further address the problem on lack of public school teachers in the municipality.

=== Primary and elementary schools ===
- Bacong Elementary School
- Dibayabay Elementary School
- Dibut Elementary School
- Dikapinisan Elementary School
- Diotorin Elementary School
- Diteki Elementary School
- Ditumabo Elementary School
- Hacienda Elementary School
- Kalapnit Elementary School
- Kamalatan Elementary School
- L. Pimentel Elementary School
- Mount Carmel School of San Luis
- Nonong Sr. Elementary School
- Our Lady of Consolacion Learning Center
- Real Elementary School
- Rosauro R. Tangson Elementary School
- San Isidro Elementary School
- San Luis Central School
- Zarah Elementary School

=== Secondary schools ===
- Dikapinisan National High School
- Dimanayat Integrated School
- Ditumabo National High School
- Mayor Cesario A. Pimentel National High School
- Rosauro R. Tangson, Sr. National High School
