= Maria Aurora National High School =

Public high school in Aurora, Philippines

Coordinates: 15°48′10″N 121°27′26″E

Aurora National Agricultural School (ANAS) was established on March 3, 1969 (57 years ago) at Barrio Bazal, Maria Aurora, Aurora by Republic Act No. 5036. It opened to the public during the 1970–1971 school year. The High School did not stay long in Bazal, because the whole ANAS populace was transferred to a 5.5-hectare school site in Barangay San Joaquin in 1986 for reasons favorable to the school populace.

On November 24, 1995, ANAS was renamed from Aurora National Agricultural School (ANAS) to Maria Aurora National High School (MANHS). The curriculum has been enhanced by integrating Agricultural and Homemaking Arts, thereby giving each student an opportunity to earn while they learn.
