= Dipaculao =

Municipality in Aurora, Philippines

- Municipality
- Municipality of Dipaculao
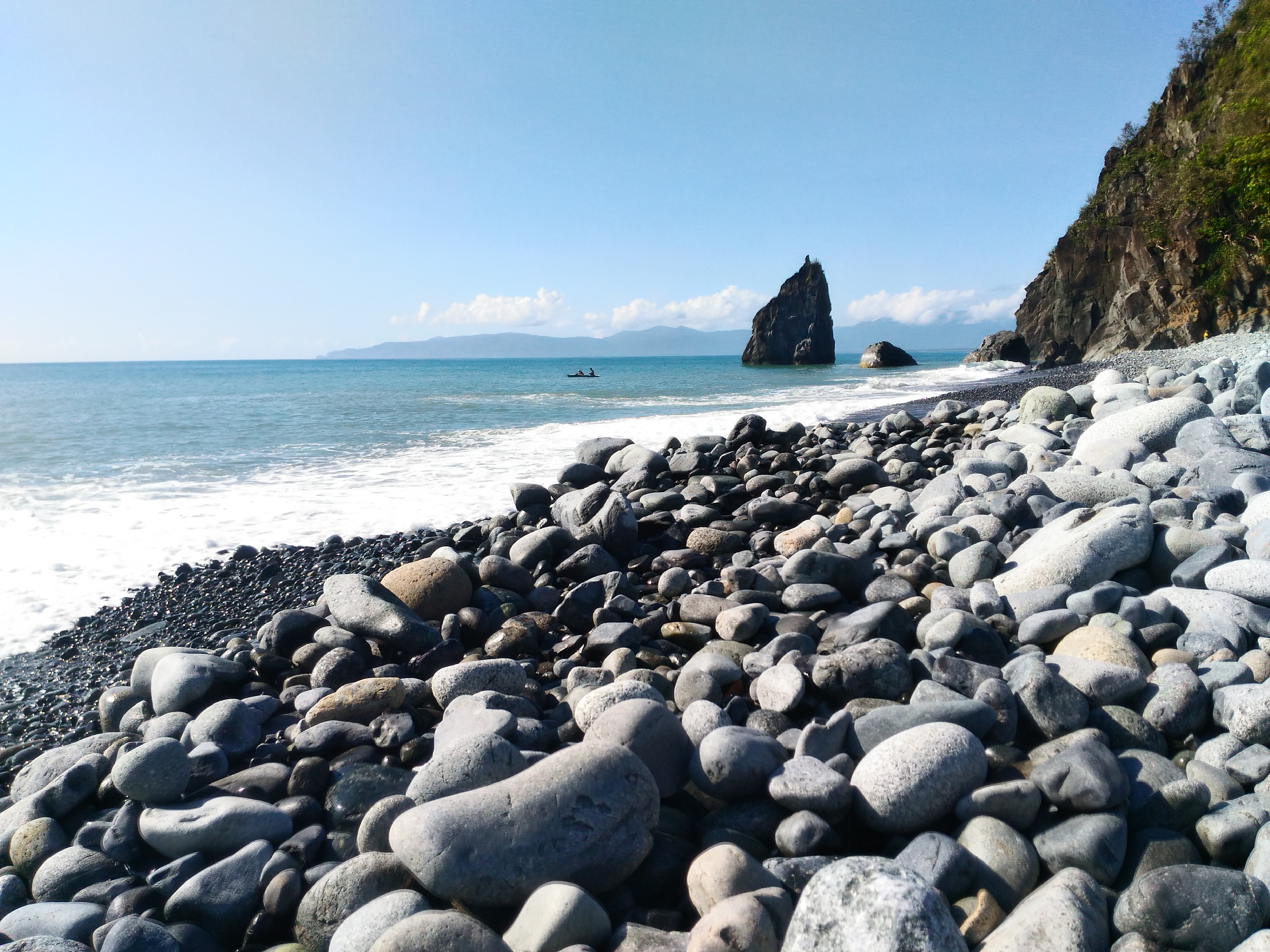
- Ampere Beach

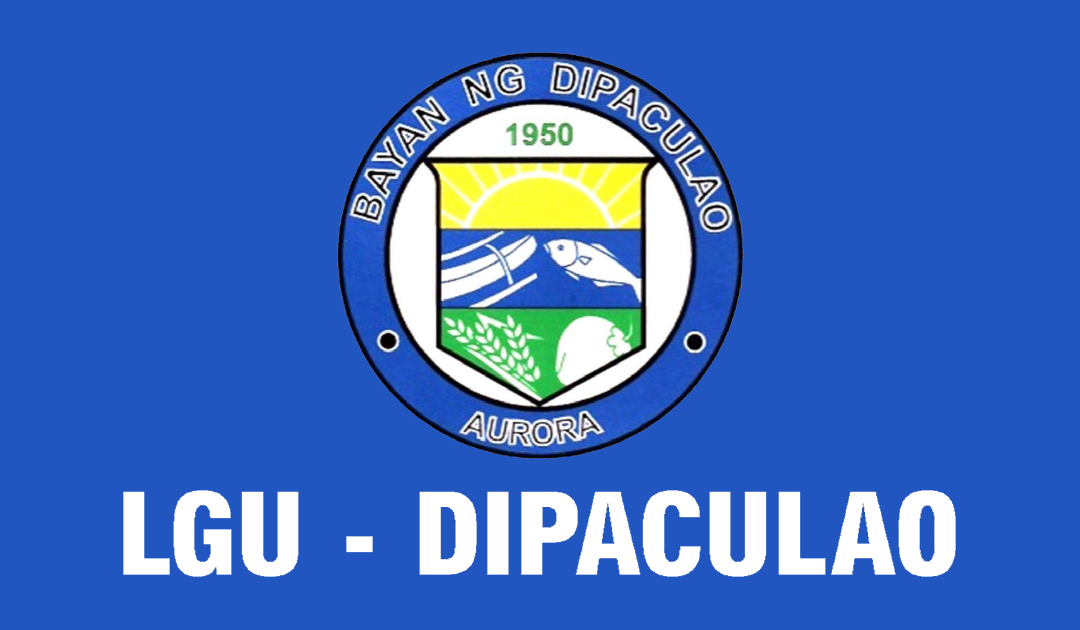
- Flag

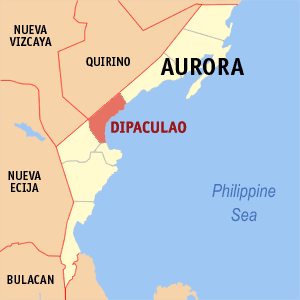
- Map of Aurora with Dipaculao highlighted
- Interactive map of Dipaculao
- Location within the Philippines
- Coordinates: 15°59′N 121°38′E
- Country: Philippines
- Region: Central Luzon
- Province: Aurora
- District: Lone district
- Founded: November 27, 1950
- Barangays: 25 (see Barangays)

Government
  - Type: Sangguniang Bayan
  - Mayor: Danilo A. Tolentino
  - Vice Mayor: Franklin J. Reyes
  - Representative: Rommel Rico T. Angara
  - Municipal Council: Members: Teresita A. Obillo; Johnny Q. Cachuela; Joseph P. Molina; Ace Francis R. Javar; Sanny R. Portera; Roberto S. delos Santos; Melanio A. Gines; Nolito D. Licaycay
  - Electorate: 21,403 voters (2025)

Area
  - Total: 361.64 km^{2} (139.63 sq mi)
- Elevation: 45 m (148 ft)
- Highest elevation: 622 m (2,041 ft)
- Lowest elevation: 0 m (0 ft)

Population (2024 census)
  - Total: 33,597
  - Density: 92.902/km^{2} (240.61/sq mi)
  - Households: 8,183

Economy
  - Income class: 1st municipal income class
  - Poverty incidence: 12.55% (2023)
  - Revenue: ₱ 244.5 million (2024)
  - Assets: ₱ 435.8 million (2024)
  - Expenditure: ₱ 203.3 million (2024)
  - Liabilities: ₱ 35.38 million (2024)

Service provider
  - Electricity: Aurora Electric Cooperative (AURELCO)
- Time zone: UTC+8 (PST)
- ZIP code: 3203
- PSGC: 0307706000
- IDD : area code: +63 (0)42
- Native languages: Ilocano; Tagalog
- Website: www.dipaculao-aurora.gov.ph

Dipaculao [ˌdiːpɐˈkuːlaʊ], officially the Municipality of Dipaculao (Tagalog: Bayan ng Dipaculao; Ilocano: Ili ti Dipaculao), is a municipality in the province of Aurora, Philippines. According to the 2024 census, it has a population of 33,597 people.

The municipality is home to the Dinadiawan River Protected Landscape. This municipality is also notable for the location where both Ateneo Blue Eagles basketball players Chukwuemeka Divine Adili and Rene Clert Noja Baterbonia died from drowning during a team building activity at a beach resort there on June 8, 2026.

== History ==
=== Early history and etymology ===
The name "Dipaculao" was first documented in Spanish records in 1719, when the Misión de San Miguel de Dipaculao was established by the Franciscan priest Sebastián de la Madre de Dios. The mission was aimed at converting the indigenous Ilongot people who lived on the preexisting settlement variously recorded as either "Ipaculao" or "Dipaculao." The mission was headed by a series of Franciscan missionaries originating from Baler, though they were all largely unsuccessful at converting the Ilongot and the nearby Casiguran Dumagat Agta.

By 1870, the settlement was recorded as being depopulated and largely abandoned by the Ilongot, who had moved to rancherías (indigenous villages) closer to the Spanish settlement of Casignan (also spelled "Casecnan" or "Casiguan", now Maria Aurora) to grow rice and various crops for trade in local markets. The few remaining inhabitants of the settlement that arrived with the Spanish are believed to have primarily consisted of Ilocano migrants, since the mission was recorded as Ilocano-speaking in Spanish publications from as early as 1865 and 1869.

The mission and the original native settlement was bounded by Casiguran to the far north, Baler to the south, and Casignan to the northwest. It was situated on an island bordered by the saltwater Dipaculao River, which merges with the Casignan River (also known as the Bicanili and Cabatangan) to the north, and an unnamed river to the southeast of Baler.

It is unknown if the settlement was named after the Dipaculao River or vice versa. The location of the Dipaculao River is also now unclear due to changes in river topography. It is likely the same river that now flows through Lobbot, Lipit, and Ipil. The prefix "di-" ("of the" or "coming from"), is a common prefix in the place names of the Ilongot people; the meaning of the other component is unknown.

=== American colonial period ===
In 1921, more migrants from Central Luzon (mostly Ilocanos from neighboring Nueva Ecija, La Union, and Pangasinan) settled in Dipaculao. Igorots from the Cordilleras also came down to live alongside Ilocanos and the aboriginal Ilongot. Other ethnic groups who came to and stayed in Dipaculao include Christianized Gaddang and Isinai settlers who settled the surrounding lowlands of Baler Bay, Gaddang from Nueva Vizcaya and Mountain Province, and Isinai from Nueva Vizcaya. Later that year, the large strip of land where the municipality is located was returned to Tayabas (present-day Quezon Province).

=== Modern era ===
On November 27, 1950, Dipaculao was converted from a barrio of Baler into an independent municipality of Quezon via Executive Order No. 375 by President Elpidio Quirino, with 16 other barrios of Baler were annexed to the new municipality. Anacleto Mijares was the first Municipal Mayor, and oversaw the transition. It later became part of Quezon's sub-province of Aurora beginning in 1951.

On June 21, 1957, the sitios of Dimabuno, Laboy, Dinadiawan and Puangi were converted into barrios. Several more sitios were converted into barrios on June 18, 1966.

The municipality later separated from Quezon and became part of the new province of Aurora on August 13, 1979.

== Geography ==
According to the Philippine Statistics Authority, the municipality has a land area of 361.64 square kilometers (139.63 sq mi) constituting 11.49% of the 3,147.32-square-kilometer (1,215.19 sq mi) total area of Aurora.

Dipaculao is situated 12.54 kilometers (7.79 mi) from the provincial capital Baler, and 264.85 kilometers (164.57 mi) from the country's capital city of Manila.

=== Barangays ===
Dipaculao is politically subdivided into 25 barangays, as shown in the matrix below. Each barangay consists of puroks and some have sitios.

PSGC	Barangay	Population			±% p.a.	
		2024		2010		
037706001	Bayabas	2.7%	915	914	▴	0.01%
037706003	Borlongan	7.2%	2,416	2,173	▴	0.74%
037706002	Buenavista	1.7%	569	554	▴	0.19%
037706004	Calaocan	2.4%	816	873	▾	−0.47%
037706025	Diamanen	1.0%	331	172	▴	4.65%
037706005	Dianed	2.1%	722	588	▴	1.44%
037706006	Diarabasin	5.1%	1,730	1,621	▴	0.45%
037706007	Dibutunan	2.6%	860	723	▴	1.21%
037706008	Dimabuno	3.6%	1,195	1,023	▴	1.09%
037706009	Dinadiawan	11.1%	3,733	3,670	▴	0.12%
037706010	Ditale	4.2%	1,398	1,297	▴	0.52%
037706011	Gupa	3.1%	1,037	991	▴	0.32%
037706012	Ipil	3.4%	1,154	1,149	▴	0.03%
037706013	Laboy	1.4%	454	404	▴	0.81%
037706014	Lipit	2.9%	968	818	▴	1.18%
037706015	Lobbot	1.7%	580	475	▴	1.40%
037706016	Maligaya	2.0%	665	574	▴	1.03%
037706017	Mijares	3.4%	1,134	1,014	▴	0.78%
037706018	Mucdol	4.4%	1,479	1,476	▴	0.01%
037706019	North Poblacion	6.1%	2,059	2,058	▴	0.00%
037706020	Puangi	4.3%	1,430	1,314	▴	0.59%
037706021	Salay	4.2%	1,417	1,323	▴	0.48%
037706022	Sapangkawayan	1.2%	405	349	▴	1.04%
037706023	South Poblacion	5.0%	1,693	1,688	▴	0.02%
037706024	Toytoyan	1.7%	576	488	▴	1.16%
	Total		33,597	27,729	▴	1.34%

=== Climate ===
Climate data for Dipaculao, Aurora
Month	Jan	Feb	Mar	Apr	May	Jun	Jul	Aug	Sep	Oct	Nov	Dec	Year
Mean daily maximum °C (°F)	27 (81)	28 (82)	29 (84)	31 (88)	31 (88)	31 (88)	30 (86)	30 (86)	30 (86)	30 (86)	29 (84)	27 (81)	29 (85)
Mean daily minimum °C (°F)	21 (70)	21 (70)	22 (72)	24 (75)	25 (77)	25 (77)	25 (77)	25 (77)	25 (77)	24 (75)	23 (73)	22 (72)	24 (74)
Average precipitation mm (inches)	41 (1.6)	39 (1.5)	35 (1.4)	54 (2.1)	198 (7.8)	246 (9.7)	305 (12.0)	300 (11.8)	274 (10.8)	192 (7.6)	77 (3.0)	69 (2.7)	1,830 (72)
Average rainy days	13.0	11.1	11.2	12.5	21.7	24.8	27.4	28.0	26.0	20.6	13.6	14.7	224.6
Source: Meteoblue (modeled/calculated data, not measured locally)

== Demographics ==
Population census of Dipaculao
Year	Pop.	±% p.a.
1960	5,149	—
1970	10,228	+7.10%
1975	12,702	+4.44%
1980	15,561	+4.14%
1990	18,951	+1.99%
1995	21,044	+1.98%
2000	23,064	+1.98%
2007	24,882	+1.05%
2010	27,729	+4.02%
2015	29,736	+1.34%
2020	33,131	+2.30%
2024	33,597	+0.34%
Source: Philippine Statistics Authority

As of the 2024 census, Dipaculao had a population of 33,597 people. The population density was 93 inhabitants per square kilometer (240/sq mi).

== Economy ==
Poverty incidence of Dipaculao (%)

Source: Philippine Statistics Authority

== Education ==
The Dipaculao Schools District Office governs all educational institutions within the municipality. It oversees the management and operations of all private and public, from primary to secondary schools.

=== Primary and elementary schools ===
- Bayabas Elementary School
- Borlongan Elementary School
- Calaocan Elementary School
- Diamanen Elementary School
- Dianed Elementary School
- Diarabasin Elementary School
- Dibutunan Elementary School
- Dinadiawan Elementary School
- Dipaculao Central School
- Ditale Elementary School
- Emeterio M. Quirino Elementary School
- Gupa Elementary School
- Ipil Elementary School
- John Wesley Child Development Center
- Laboy Elementary School
- Lipit Elementary School
- Lobbot Elementary School
- Maligaya Elementary School
- Mijares Elementary School
- Mucdol Elementary School
- Puangi Elementary School
- Sapangkawayan Elementary School
- Teodorico A. Molina Sr. Elementary School
- Toytoyan Elementary School

=== Secondary schools ===
- Borlongan National High School
- Dipaculao National High School
- Dinadiawan National High School
- Diarabasin National High School
- Father John Karash Memorial High School
- Mijares National High School
- Puangi National High School

=== Higher educational institution ===
- Dipaculao College of Science and Technology

== Gallery ==
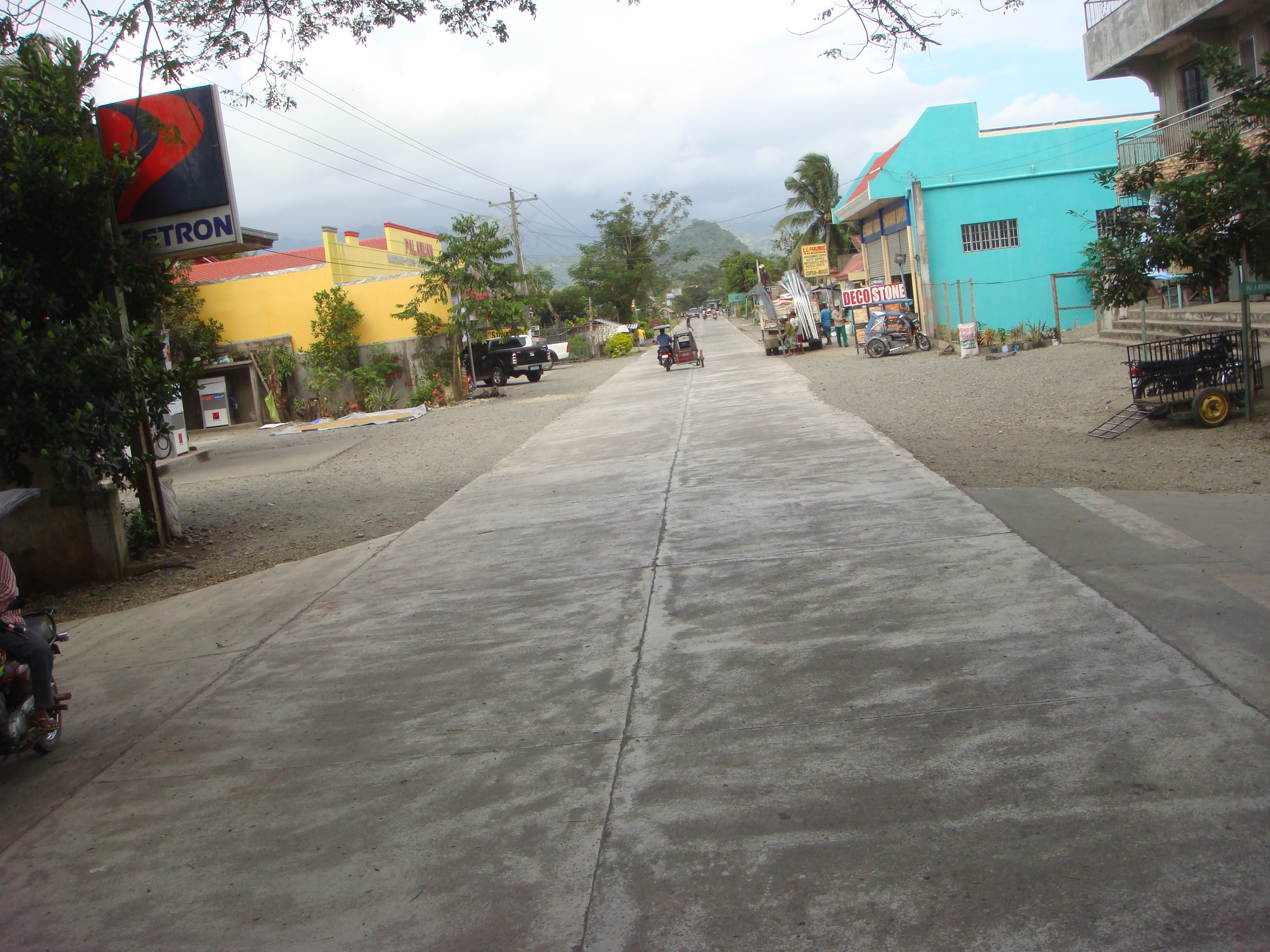
South Poblacion

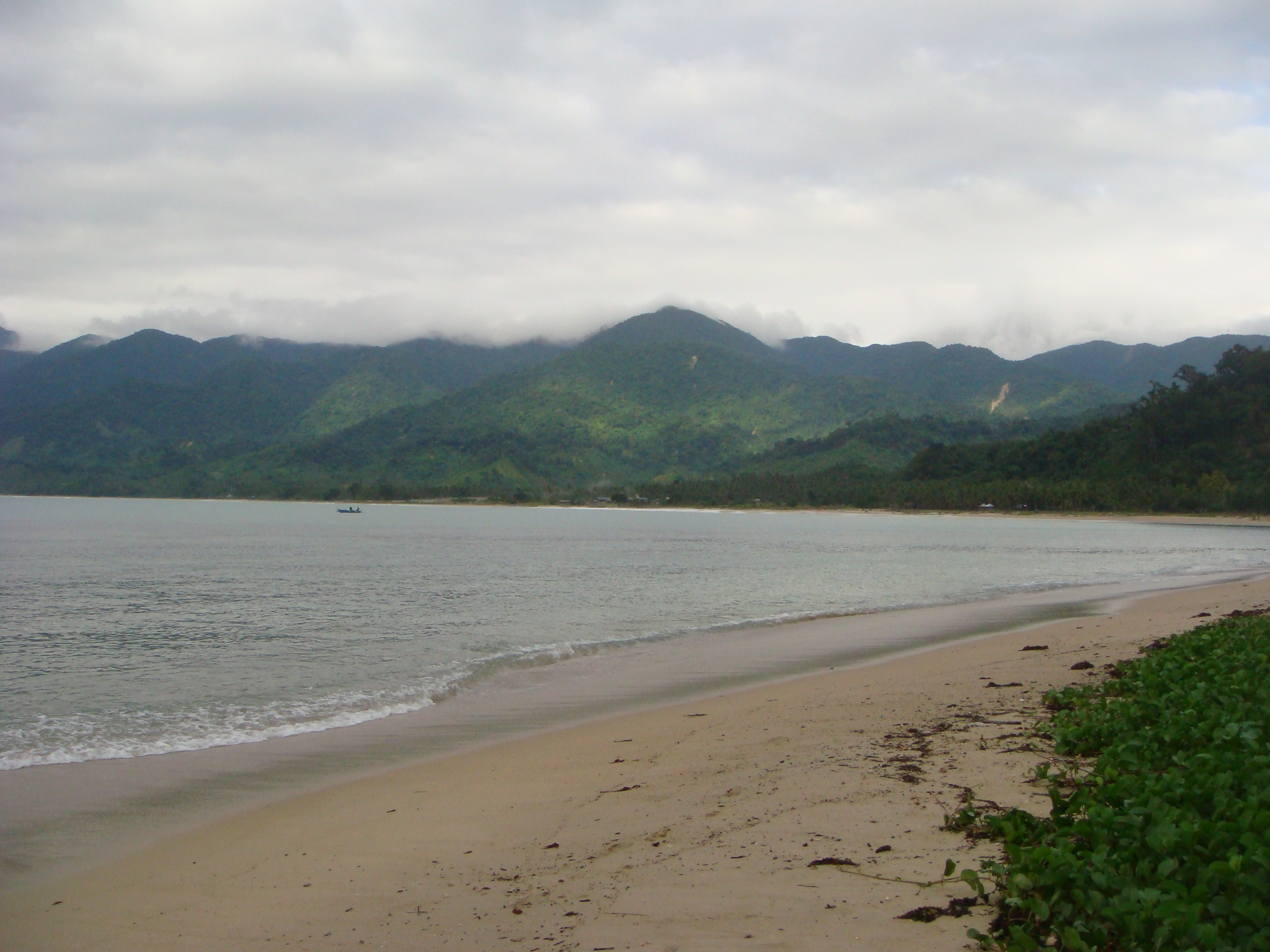
Dinadiawan white beach (a long stretch of clean, fine, golden white sand coastline)

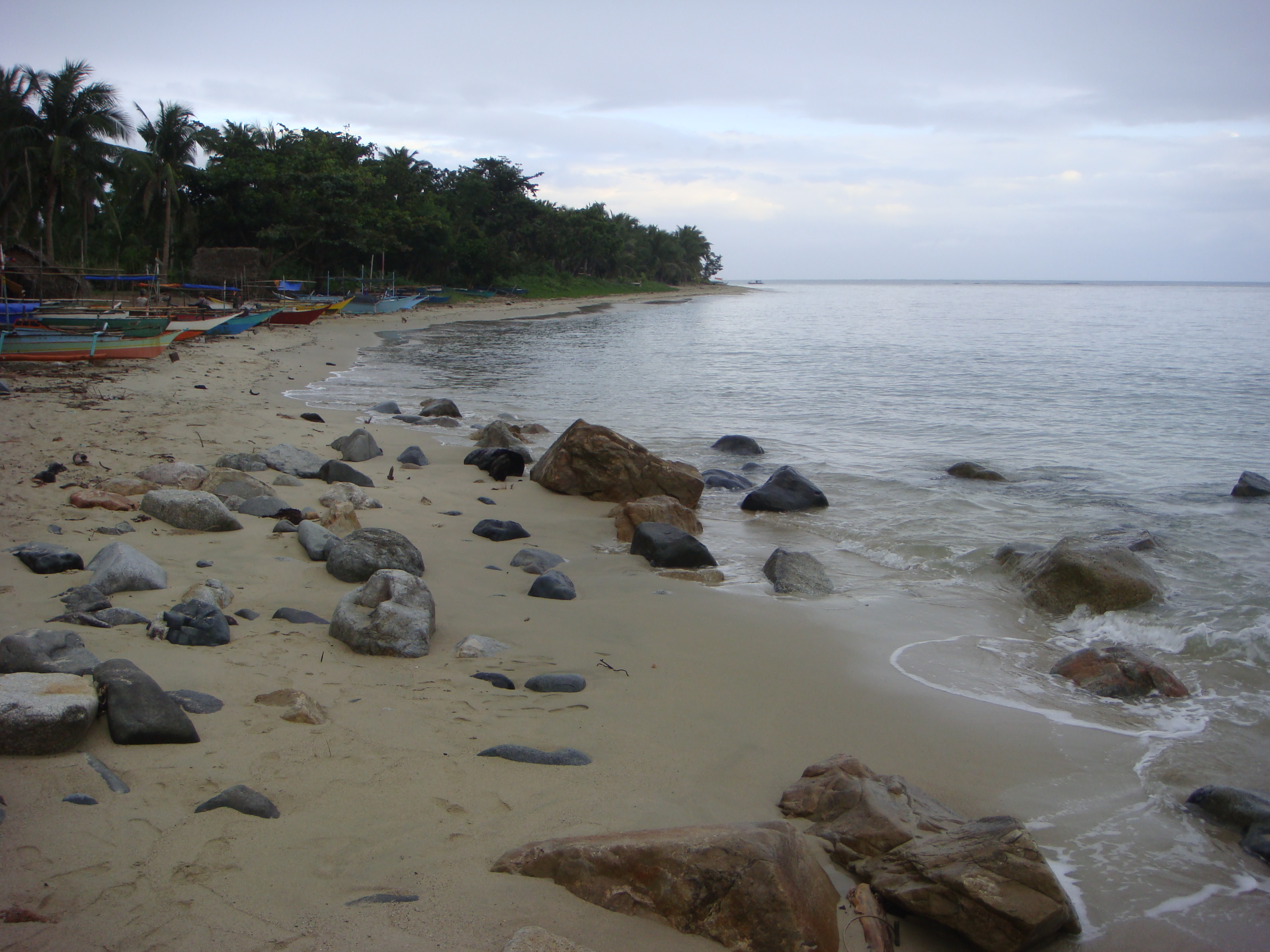
Rock formations along the shoreline (north of Baler along the Dicadi highway)

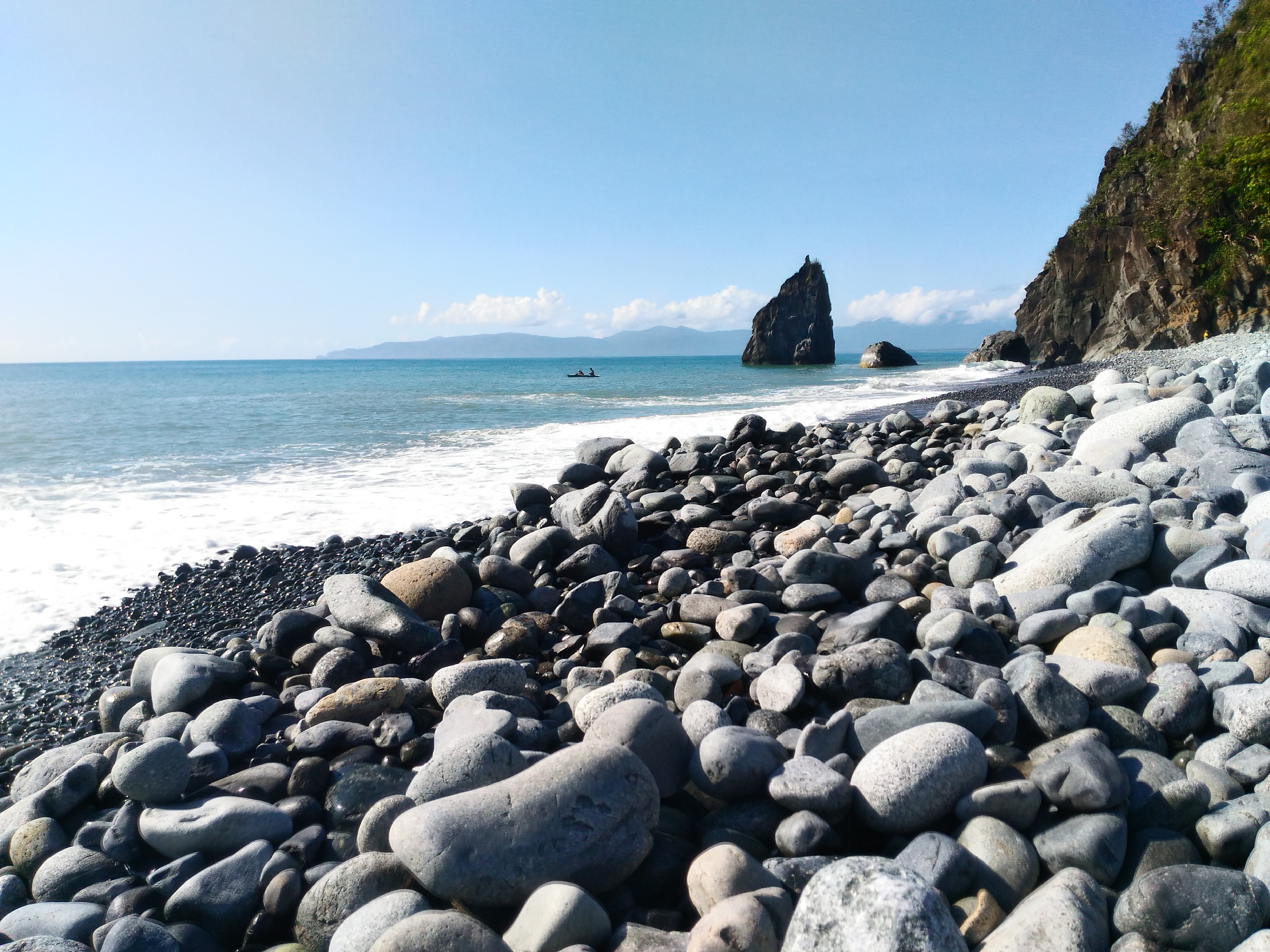
Ampere Beach and Ampere Rock in Dipaculao

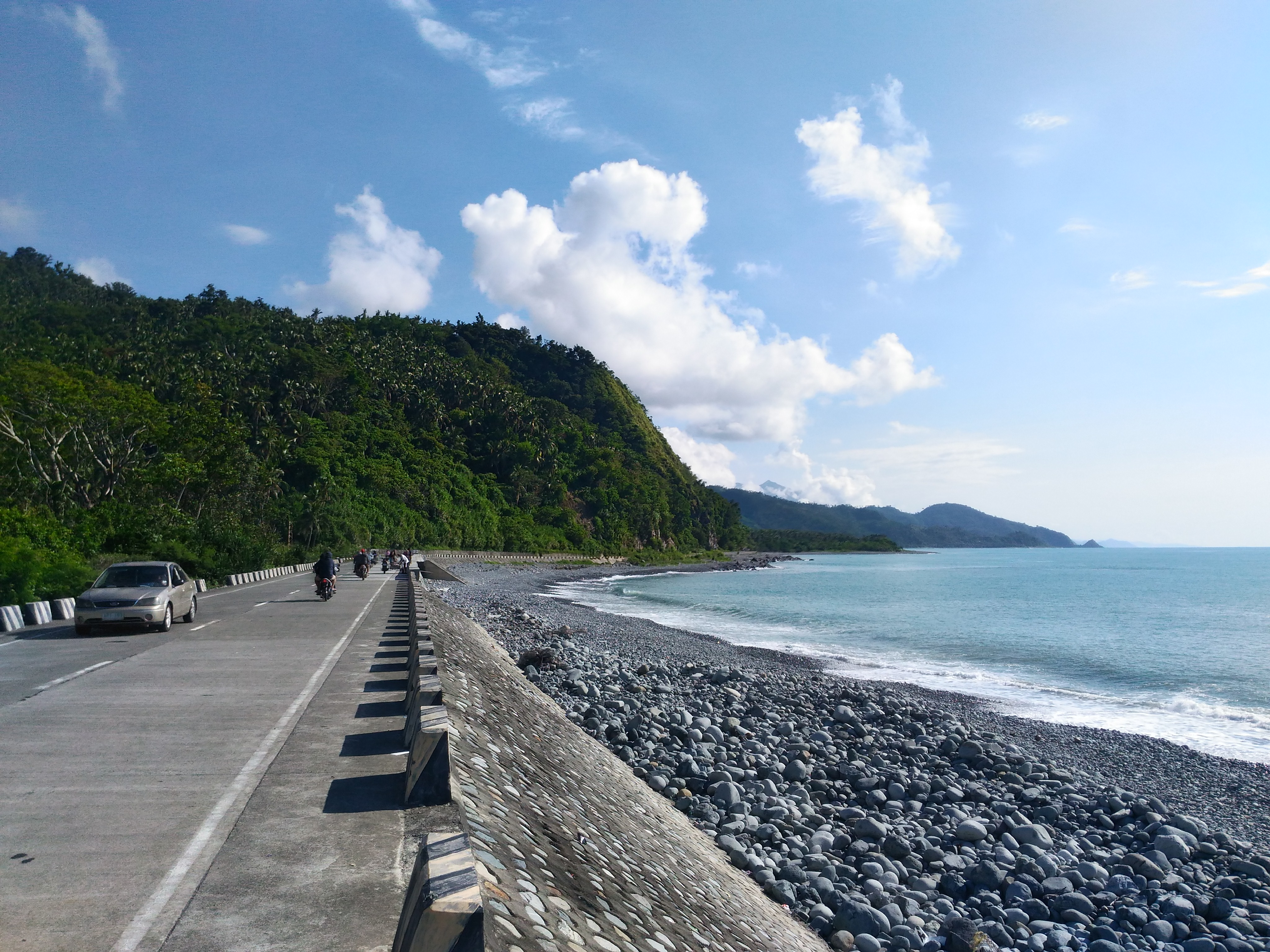
Ampere Beach and Baler-Casiguran Road
