= Maria Aurora, Aurora =

Municipality in Aurora, Philippines

Maria Aurora
- Municipality
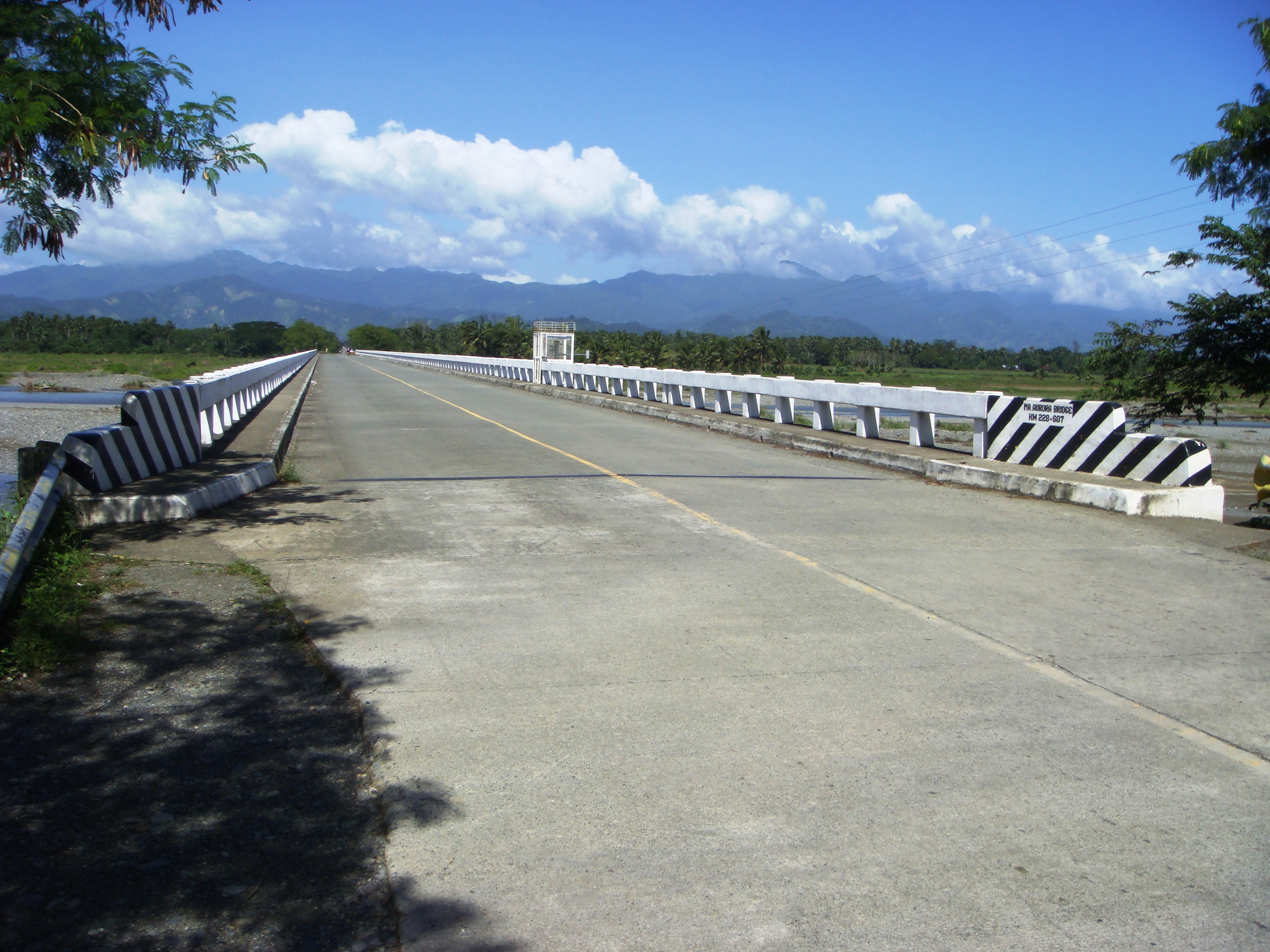
- Ma. Aurora Bridge

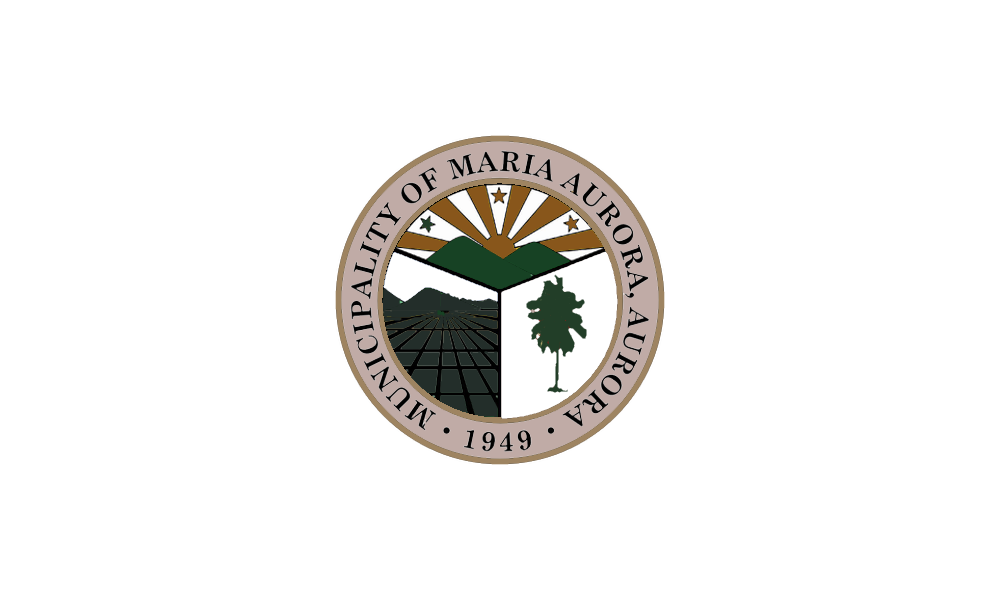
- Flag Seal

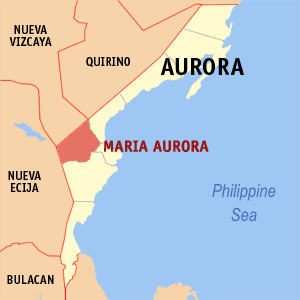
- Map of Aurora with Maria Aurora highlighted
- Interactive map of Maria Aurora
- Location within the Philippines
- Coordinates: 15°47′48″N 121°28′25″E
- Country: Philippines
- Region: Central Luzon
- Province: Aurora
- District: Lone district
- Founded: July 21, 1949
- Named for: Maria Aurora "Baby" Quezon
- Barangays: 40 (see Barangays)

Government
  - Type: Sangguniang Bayan
  - Mayor: Ariel S. Bitong
  - Vice Mayor: Amado M. Geneta
  - Representative: Rommel Rico T. Angara
  - Municipal Council: Members: Enrico O. Cordova; Freddie B. Bitong; Erwin E. Tablang; Rhiza R. Silvestre; Loreto M. Nisperos; Rolando H. Aznar Jr.; Onasis Q. Ronquillo; Elizabeth L. Farin
  - Electorate: 28,409 voters (2025)

Area
  - Total: 426.19 km^{2} (164.55 sq mi)
- Elevation: 66 m (217 ft)
- Highest elevation: 441 m (1,447 ft)
- Lowest elevation: 12 m (39 ft)

Population (2024 census)
  - Total: 45,972
  - Density: 107.87/km^{2} (279.38/sq mi)
  - Households: 11,016

Economy
  - Income class: 1st municipal income class
  - Poverty incidence: 11.65% (2023)
  - Revenue: ₱ 295.6 million (2024)
  - Assets: ₱ 526.3 million (2024)
  - Expenditure: ₱ 271.9 million (2024)
  - Liabilities: ₱ 129.8 million (2024)

Service provider
  - Electricity: Aurora Electric Cooperative (AURELCO)
- Time zone: UTC+8 (PST)
- ZIP code: 3202
- PSGC: 0307707000
- IDD : area code: +63 (0)42
- Native languages: Northern Alta; Tagalog; Ilocano
- Website: www.maria-aurora.gov.ph

Maria Aurora, officially the Municipality of Maria Aurora (Tagalog: Bayan ng Maria Aurora; Ilocano: Ili ti Maria Aurora), is the only landlocked municipality in the province of Aurora, Philippines. According to the 2024 census, it has a population of 45,972 people.

Despite being the only landlocked town of the province, it is the most populated municipality of Aurora. The Millennium Tree in Balete Park and the lush green landscape is Maria Aurora's main tourist asset.

== Etymology ==
The town was named after Maria Aurora "Baby" Aragon Quezon, the first daughter of Philippine President Manuel L. Quezon and First Lady Aurora Aragon Quezon. Maria Aurora, along with her mother Aurora, was ambushed and assassinated on April 28, 1949, by elements of the Hukbalahap movement in Bongabon, Nueva Ecija.

== History ==
The original settlers of the town now known as Maria Aurora were Bugkalot. These people are characterized as barbaric, wild and head hunters. They first established their settlement in an area known as "Egabong" (meaning muddy stream) and was considered at that time as "no man's land", since no Christian dared to enter the place for fear of beheading.

The arrival of a man from Liliw, Laguna named Jose Bitong who was considered the first Christian adventurer/settler, changed the course of events when he married a young Bugkalot lady and later won the admiration and confidence of the Bugkalots. From then on, he became one of their dynamic leaders and was respected by the Bugkalot Tribe and Christians as well. This opened the gate for Spanish missionaries to settle in the area and convert the settlers to Catholicism.

In 1771, the settlement was named and known as San Jose de Casecnan or San Jose de Casignan in honor of Jose Bitong and Casecnan River which the Spanish believed it flows near the settlement.

In 1896, a group of Ilocano settlers from Aringay, La Union came to stay in the town, which was part of District of El Príncipe, Nueva Ecija. In 1906, another group of Ilocanos arrived from La Union and Pangasinan. Because of dominance of Ilocanos in Maria Aurora, Rang-ay Festival is celebrated, wherein rang-ay is an Ilocano word for progress. The word is distinctively chosen to confine the focus of celebration on the progressive vision of the people of Maria Aurora that are dominantly Ilocanos.

The municipality of Maria Aurora was established on July 21, 1949, through the Executive Order No. 246 out of various portions of the municipalities of Baler. From its establishment, it was initially part of Quezon province, specifically its sub-province of Aurora beginning in 1951. It was later excised from Quezon and became part of the new province of Aurora in 1979.

Through Presidential Proclamation No. 687, September 23, 2024 was declared a special working day in Maria Aurora, Aurora to celebrate the birth anniversary of the town's namesake, María Aurora "Baby" Quezon.

=== Proposal for the Municipality of Dr. Juan C. Angara ===
A separate municipality called Dr. Juan C. Angara is being proposed under Senate Bill No. 3132 and House Bill No. 6518. Named after the father of former provincial governor Bella Angara and former Senator Edgardo Angara, the proposed municipality shall have a land area of 201.2 square kilometers (77.7 sq mi) and is composed of western barangays of Dianawan, Decoliat, Galintuja, San Juan, Suguit, Bazal, Pungio, Villa Aurora and Dialatnan. San Juan will serve as poblacion or the seat of government.

== Geography ==
According to the Philippine Statistics Authority, the municipality has a land area of 426.19 square kilometers (164.55 sq mi) constituting 13.54% of the 3,147.32-square-kilometer (1,215.19 sq mi) total area of Aurora.

Maria Aurora is the only non-coastal municipality of the province. It is bounded by Baler and Dipaculao on the east, San Luis on the south, Bongabon in the Province of Nueva Ecija on the west and Alfonso Castañeda in the Province of Nueva Vizcaya on the north-west; Maria Aurora is the only municipality of Aurora bordered by Nueva Vizcaya.

Maria Aurora is situated 13.54 kilometers (8.41 mi) from the provincial capital Baler, and 254.85 kilometers (158.36 mi) from the country's capital city of Manila.

=== Barangays ===
Maria Aurora is politically subdivided into 40 barangays, as shown in the matrix below. Each barangay consists of puroks and some have sitios.

PSGC	Barangay	Population			±% p.a.	
		2024		2010		
037707001	Alcala	1.2%	553	521	▴	0.41%
037707002	Bagtu	1.7%	779	748	▴	0.28%
037707003	Bangco	1.5%	676	636	▴	0.42%
037707004	Bannawag	1.1%	496	492	▴	0.06%
037707005	Barangay I (Poblacion)	2.9%	1,356	1,260	▴	0.51%
037707006	Barangay II (Poblacion)	4.2%	1,930	1,874	▴	0.20%
037707007	Barangay III (Poblacion)	1.9%	894	873	▴	0.17%
037707008	Barangay IV (Poblacion)	5.3%	2,458	2,465	▾	−0.02%
037707009	Baubo	1.4%	642	634	▴	0.09%
037707010	Bayanihan	3.1%	1,425	1,325	▴	0.51%
037707011	Bazal	3.0%	1,368	1,274	▴	0.50%
037707012	Cabituculan East	1.5%	676	664	▴	0.12%
037707013	Cabituculan West	1.2%	534	493	▴	0.56%
037707027	Cadayacan	3.0%	1,357	1,261	▴	0.51%
037707014	Debucao	3.0%	1,385	1,293	▴	0.48%
037707015	Decoliat	1.0%	472	457	▴	0.22%
037707016	Detailen	1.9%	879	793	▴	0.72%
037707017	Diaat	3.3%	1,528	1,460	▴	0.32%
037707018	Dialatman	0.4%	198	183	▴	0.55%
037707019	Diaman	0.6%	257	239	▴	0.51%
037707020	Dianawan	2.6%	1,191	1,111	▴	0.48%
037707021	Dikildit	2.2%	1,019	908	▴	0.80%
037707022	Dimanpudso	2.9%	1,353	1,296	▴	0.30%
037707023	Diome	1.9%	857	760	▴	0.84%
037707024	Estonilo	1.7%	784	755	▴	0.26%
037707025	Florida	4.0%	1,825	1,635	▴	0.77%
037707026	Galintuja	1.6%	729	598	▴	1.39%
037707028	Malasin	1.4%	654	593	▴	0.68%
037707029	Ponglo	1.0%	466	543	▾	−1.06%
037707030	Quirino	4.0%	1,843	1,584	▴	1.06%
037707031	Ramada	2.5%	1,172	1,134	▴	0.23%
037707032	San Joaquin	3.7%	1,714	1,634	▴	0.33%
037707033	San Jose	3.6%	1,677	1,460	▴	0.97%
037707040	San Juan	1.9%	876	891	▾	−0.12%
037707034	San Leonardo	1.0%	455	475	▾	−0.30%
037707035	Santa Lucia	1.3%	578	541	▴	0.46%
037707036	Santo Tomas	1.5%	697	684	▴	0.13%
037707037	Suguit	1.3%	604	564	▴	0.48%
037707038	Villa Aurora	1.9%	878	751	▴	1.09%
037707039	Wenceslao	3.3%	1,499	1,266	▴	1.18%
	Total		45,972	38,128	▴	1.31%

=== Climate ===
Climate data for Maria Aurora, Aurora
Month	Jan	Feb	Mar	Apr	May	Jun	Jul	Aug	Sep	Oct	Nov	Dec	Year
Mean daily maximum °C (°F)	27 (81)	28 (82)	29 (84)	32 (90)	32 (90)	31 (88)	30 (86)	30 (86)	30 (86)	29 (84)	29 (84)	27 (81)	30 (85)
Mean daily minimum °C (°F)	20 (68)	20 (68)	21 (70)	23 (73)	24 (75)	24 (75)	24 (75)	24 (75)	24 (75)	23 (73)	22 (72)	21 (70)	23 (72)
Average precipitation mm (inches)	25 (1.0)	26 (1.0)	18 (0.7)	24 (0.9)	91 (3.6)	145 (5.7)	149 (5.9)	122 (4.8)	120 (4.7)	128 (5.0)	61 (2.4)	52 (2.0)	961 (37.7)
Average rainy days	7.7	5.7	6.8	8.0	18.2	22.1	24.3	23.4	22.7	17.5	10.0	9.4	175.8
Source: Meteoblue (modeled/calculated data, not measured locally)

== Demographics ==
Population census of Maria Aurora

Year	Pop.	±% p.a.
1960	10,182	—
1970	18,193	+5.97%
1975	23,252	+5.04%
1980	26,822	+2.90%
1990	28,378	+0.57%
1995	30,796	+1.54%

Year	Pop.	±% p.a.
2000	33,551	+1.85%
2007	35,289	+0.70%
2010	38,128	+2.86%
2015	40,734	+1.27%
2020	44,958	+2.10%
2024	45,972	+0.54%

Source: Philippine Statistics Authority

In the 2024 census, Maria Aurora had a population of 45,972 people. The population density was 110 inhabitants per square kilometer (280/sq mi).

== Economy ==
Poverty incidence of Maria Aurora (%)

Source: Philippine Statistics Authority

== Government ==
=== List of mayors ===
Maria Aurora was administered by 12 mayors since its establishment in 1949.

- Mayor Pedro C. Montero (Jul 21, 1949 – Dec 31, 1951)
- Mayor Pedro S. Wenceslao (Jan 1, 1952 – Jun 21, 1958)
- Mayor Brigido E. Collado (Jun 22, 1958 – Dec 31, 1959)
- Mayor Leon B. Hulipas (Jan 1, 1960 – Dec 31, 1963)
- Mayor Leonardo T. Ong (Jan 1, 1964 – Aug 15, 1977)
- Mayor Juan R. Ortiz (Aug 16, 1977 – May 8, 1986)
- OJC Adriano C. Bitong (May 9, 1986 – Dec 1, 1987)
- OJC (LGO) Nepumuceno W. Gonzales (Dec 1, 1987 – Dec 15, 1987)
- Sec. Lorenzo O. Mangaoang (Dec. 16, 1987 – Feb 2, 1988)
- Mayor Adriano C. Bitong (Feb 3, 1988 – Jun 30, 1998)
- Mayor Brigido M. Noval (Jun 30, 1998 – Jun 30, 2004)
- Mayor Ariel S. Bitong (Jun 30, 2004 – Jun 30, 2013)
- Mayor Amado M. Geneta (Jun 30, 2013 – Jun 30, 2022)
- Mayor Ariel S. Bitong (Jun 30, 2022 – Present)

== Transportation ==
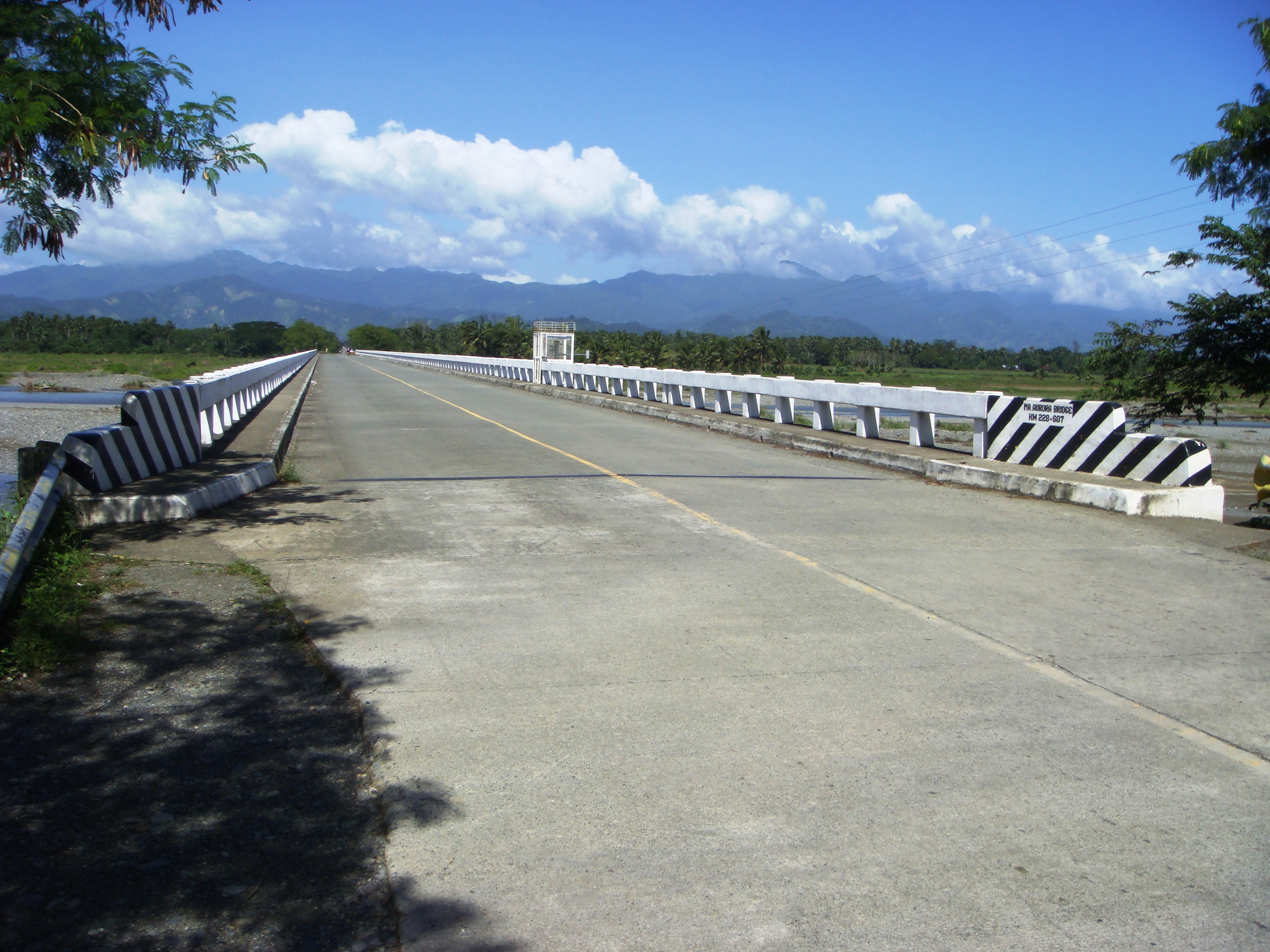
The 110-meter (360 ft) Bazal Bridge, linking Bazal and Malasin to town proper

Maria Aurora can be accessed by road through two routes: the Canili–Pantabangan Road, which passes Nueva Ecija's northern towns and through Alfonso Castañeda, Nueva Vizcaya; and the Nueva Ecija–Aurora Road, built on the 1940s that traverses the Sierra Madre Mountains and passes through the towns of Baler and San Luis.

Today, the Canili–Pantabangan Road is much more commonly used, though it extends travel time for 1 hour, it is the safest route for vehicles. Originally, the Nueva Ecija–Aurora Road is the standard road for bus commuters, the shortest but the steep turns and unpaved roads makes it the most dangerous for heavy vehicles.

There are five bus lines that serve Maria Aurora's vicinity: Maria Aurora Express (PAPIN) (Cabanatuan–Dipaculao); D' Liner (Cabanatuan\Baguio - Maria Aurora, Casiguran; Genesis Bus Transport (Manila\Cabanatuan - Baler); - Aurora Bus Line (Cabanatuan - Baler) and Lizardo Transit (Baguio - Baler)

== Healthcare ==
The Department of Health sustains health over the municipality. The municipality has 21 health centers and one provincial hospital, the Aurora Provincial Hospital located in barangay Buhangin in Baler, 30 kilometers (19 mi) south of the town.

== Education ==
Maria Aurora has its education sustained by the Department of Education - Division of Aurora. The municipality has 38 public elementary and high schools with 1 central school (Maria Aurora Central School). Private institutions in the municipality include Mount Carmel School of Maria Aurora and Wesleyan University - Philippines (Aurora).

The Maria Aurora Schools District Office governs all educational institutions within the municipality. It oversees the management and operations of all private and public, from primary to secondary schools.

=== Primary and elementary schools ===
- Bagtu Elementary School
- Bernabe R. Dulay Memorial Elementary School
- Cabituculan East Elementary School
- Calao Elementary School
- Debucao Elementary School
- Decoliat Elementary School
- Detailen Elementary School
- Diaat Elementary School
- Dikildit Elementary School
- Dimanpudso Elementary School
- Dimotol Elementary School
- Diome Elementary School
- Estonilo Elementary School
- Felipe R. Valdez Elementary School
- Florida Elementary School
- Francisco Q. Dagyapen Memorial Elementary School
- Galintuja Elementary School
- Kadayakan Elementary School
- Leon B. Hulipas Elementary School
- Leon Diaz Sr. Elementary School
- Marcos R. Necesito Sr. Memorial Elementary School
- Maria Aurora Central School
- Maria Aurora Christian School
- Mount Carmel School of Maria Aurora
- Philos Montessori Learning Center
- Punglo Elementary School
- Quirino Elementary School
- Ramada Elementary School
- San Jose Elementary School
- San Juan Elementary School
- San Leonardo Elementary School
- St. John Ecumenical Learning Center of Maria Aurora
- Sta. Lucia Elementary School
- Sto. Tomas Elementary School
- Suguit Elementary School
- Villa Aurora Elementary School
- Wenceslao Elementary School
- Wesley Kiddie Development Center

=== Secondary schools ===
- Bayanihan National High School
- Canili Area National High School
- Dianawan National High School
- Eliseo C. Ronquillo Sr. Memorial National High School
- Maria Aurora National High School
- Ramada National High School
- Rodrigo D. Palmero Memorial National High School
- Suguit National High School
- Wenceslao National High School
- Villa Aurora National High School

=== Higher educational institution ===
- Wesleyan University - Philippines
- Lyceum of the East

== Gallery ==
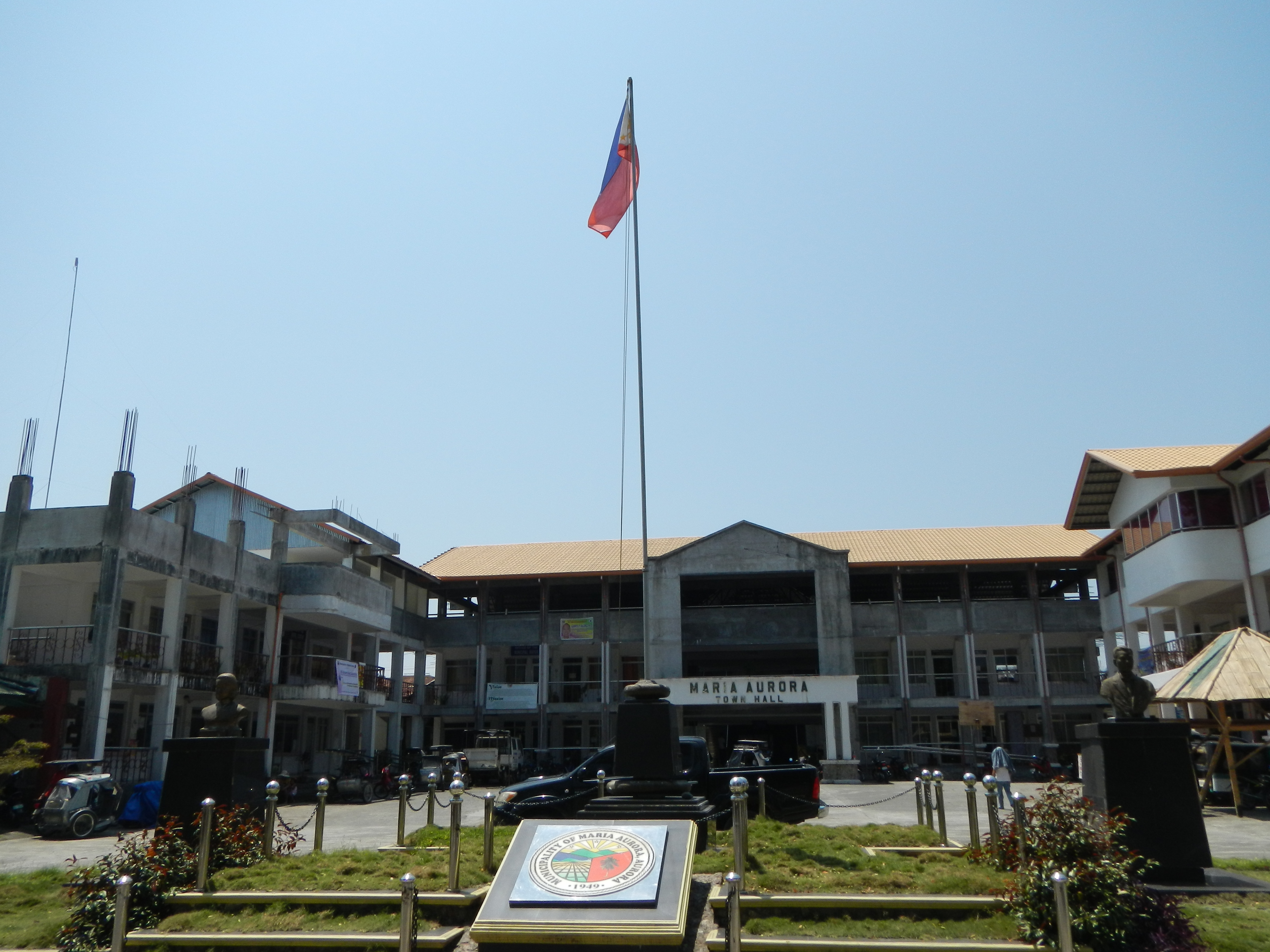
Municipal hall

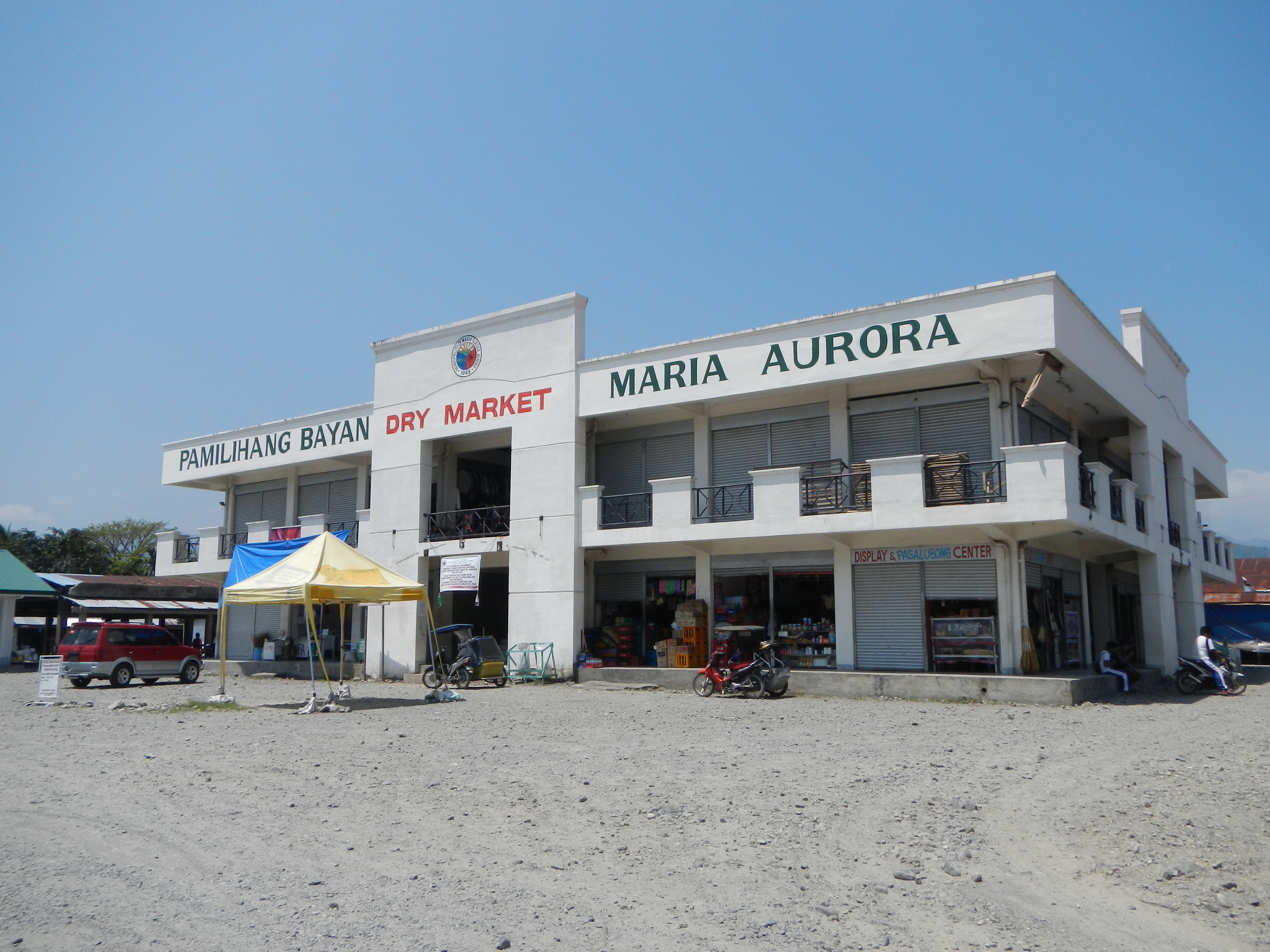
Public market

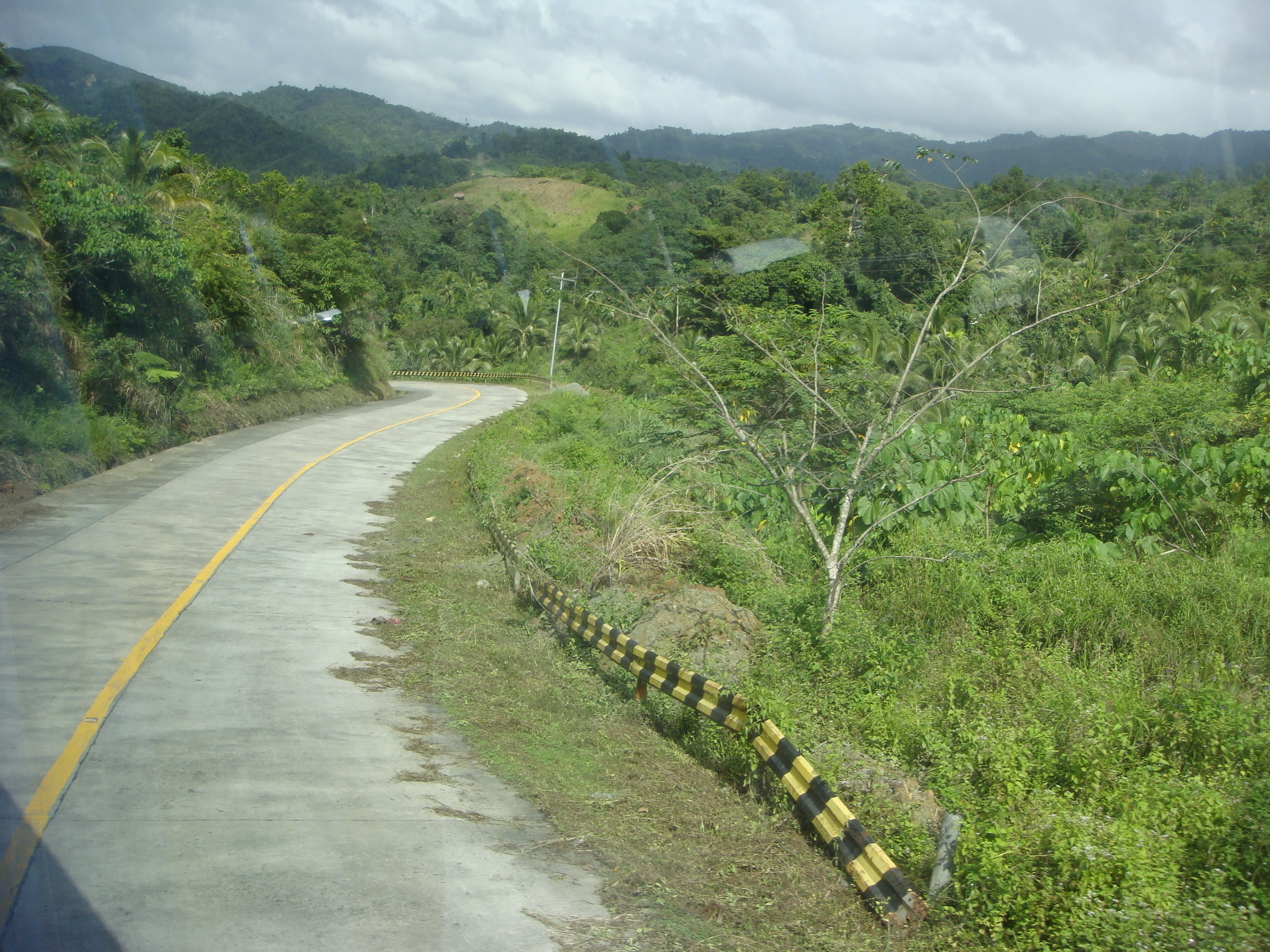
Highway, mountains and forests (Sitio Dimasalang, Barangay Dimotol)

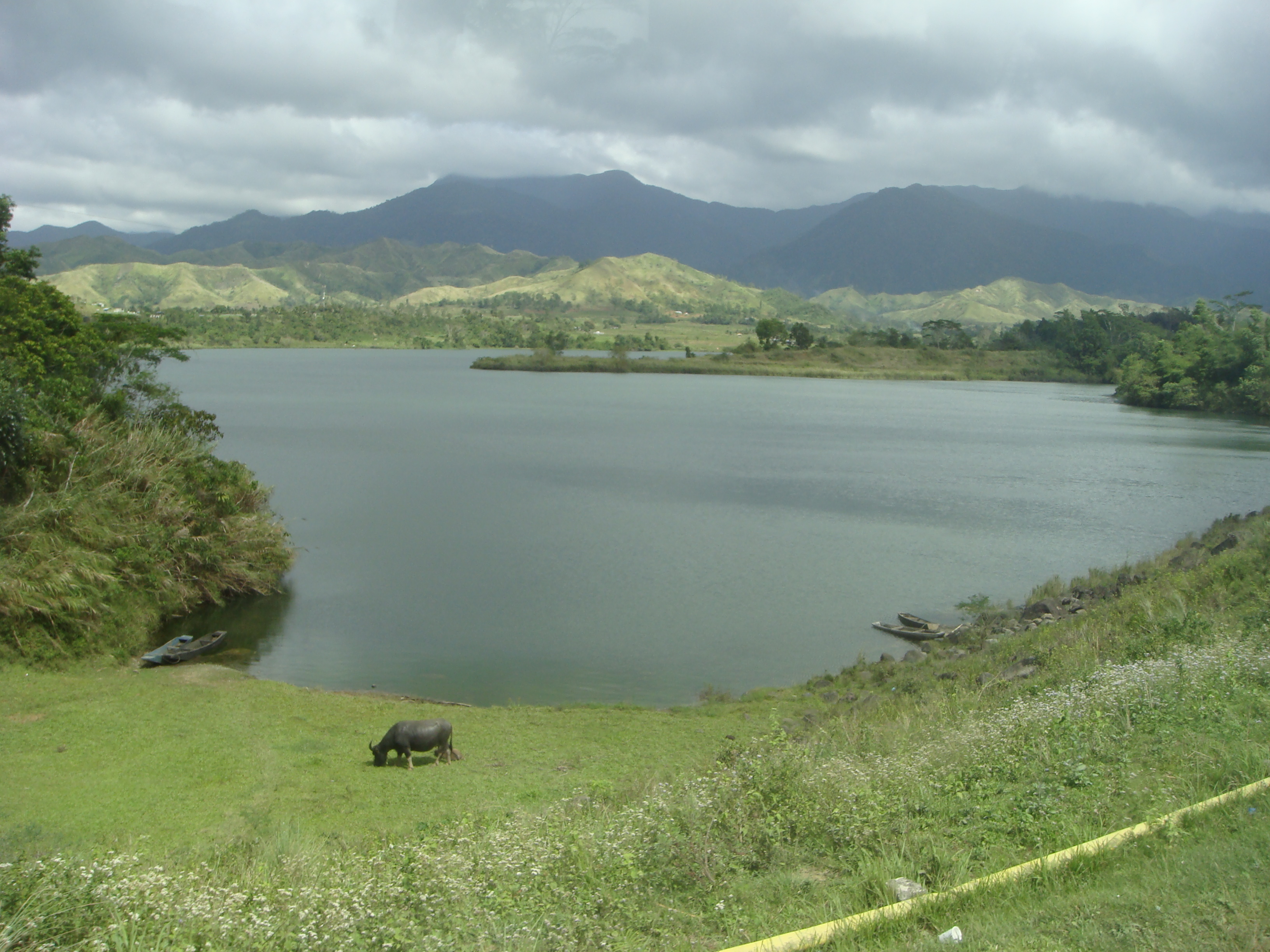
1970's Canili and Diayo Dams and Reservoirs (tributaries of Pantabangan Dam)

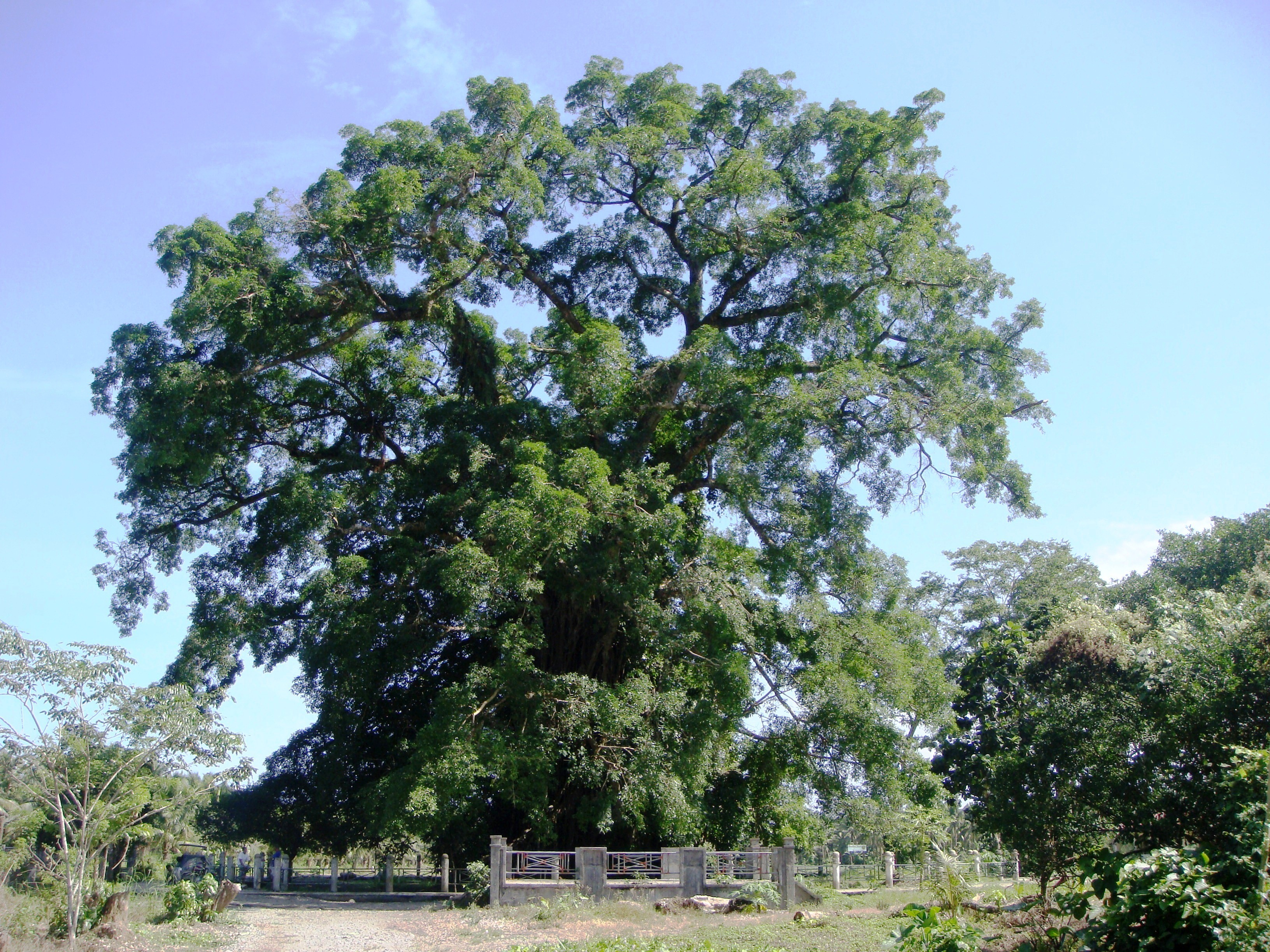
Millennium Tree at Balete Park
