= Water privatization in Metro Manila =

Water privatization in Metro Manila began when the then President of the Philippines, Fidel Ramos, instructed the government in 1994 to solve what he called the water crisis in Manila by engaging with the private sector. In 1997, two concession contracts for the Eastern and Western halves of Metro Manila were awarded after an open competition. The concessions represent the largest population served by private operators in the developing world. Both winning companies, Maynilad Water Services in West Manila and especially Manila Water in East Manila, submitted bids with extremely low water tariffs. The tariffs proved to be too low to finance the investments needed to improve performance, especially after the East Asian financial crisis and the devaluation of the Philippine Peso.

Maynilad expanded access, but unable to reduce water losses it stopped paying concession fees to the government and went bankrupt in 2003. It was temporarily taken over by the government, sold to new investors in 2007 and performance has improved since. Manila Water struggled initially, but increased its contractual rate of return by arbitration in 1998, improved performance, and in 2003 the International Finance Corporation (IFC) provided a loan and took an equity stake in the company, followed by an initial public offering (IPO) of shares on the Manila stock exchange in 2004 and local currency bond sales in 2008.

Neither company achieved its contractual targets of increased access. Improvements in access and service quality were slow during the first years, especially in West Manila. Progress in water sanitation has been far below the contractual targets of access to sewerage from less than 10 percent to 66 percent in West Manila and 55 percent in East Manila until 2021.

Tariffs in both halves of the metropolitan area were first reduced, but then increased substantially. After adjustment for inflation, in 2008 average tariffs in West Manila were 89 percent higher than the pre-privatization tariff of 1997, and 59 percent higher in East Manila.

== Background ==
=== Financial arrangements ===
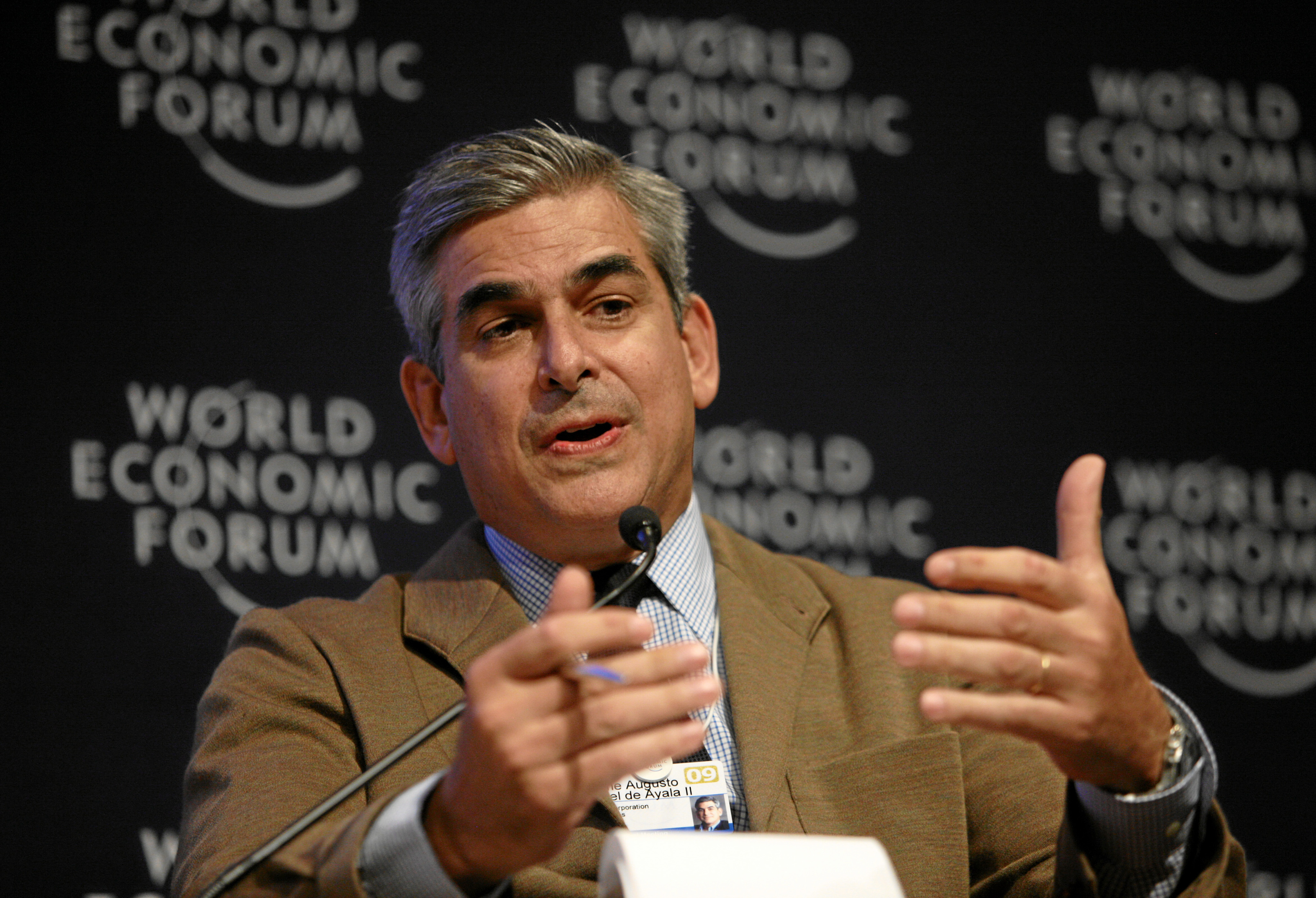
Jaime Augusto Zobel, Chairman of the Ayala Corporation and Vice-Chairman of Manila Water, the subsidiary of Ayala Corporation that holds the water concession for East Manila.

Under a concession agreement, private companies collect and own revenues from water tariffs. In return they have to pay for operating costs, investments and in the case of Manila a concession fee to the Filipino government to pay for the legacy debt and the relatively modest cost of running a regulatory office.

The investments under the Manila concessions were financed through debt, equity and retained earnings. During the first years of the concessions the companies faced difficulties in obtaining loans due to the East Asian financial crisis. In 2003 Manila Water obtained a US$30 million loan from the International Finance Corporation (IFC) followed by two more loans of the same amount. IFC invested US$15 million in Manila Water in preparation of the initial public offering (IPO) of its shares on the Manila stock exchange in 2005. The IPO raised nearly US$100 million. and Manila Water issued several local currency bonds beginning with a 4 billion (almost US$100 million) bond issued in 2008.

Investments in sanitation were financed partly through World Bank loans to the government, with MWSS implementing. During its first 15 years Manila Water alone invested US$1.2 billion in exchanging 85 percent of the existing network, expanding the network, modernizing a water treatment plant and building wastewater treatment plants.

The private companies are allowed to earn a rate of return on total capital per their respective financial bids, called "weighted average cost of capital" or "market-based appropriate discount rate" in their contract. Manila Water's rate of return in its bid was only 5.2 percent. On that basis it submitted a very low tariff that allowed it to win the concession. In 2001, Manila Water succeeded in having its rate of return increased to 9.3 percent after international arbitration. Maynilad's bid had a more realistic 10.4 percent rate of return in its bid had from the beginning. The return on equity has been higher than the return on total capital. In the case of Manila Water, the return on equity has been 18-20 percent beginning from its fourth year of operation.

As of 2011 water tariffs in Manila are set by the Board of MWSS upon recommendation of its regulatory office and on the basis of four mechanisms:

- First, tariffs are adjusted automatically on the basis of exchange rate fluctuations applied to the company's debt. This mechanism is revenue-neutral. Initially this mechanism was applied with a lag, but after a contract amendment it is now applied every three months.
- Second, tariffs are adjusted annually on the basis of inflation (indexing to the consumer price index).
- Third, tariffs are adjusted every five years to guarantee a certain rate of return to the private concession holder (rate rebasing). The company's performance vis a vis regulatory targets is also considered in determining the tariff.
- Fourth, extraordinary price adjustments can also be granted, but only in specific circumstances such as a change in law or force majeure.

Both private companies initially had to post a performance bond that MWSS could call if the companies failed to fulfill their obligations. Maynilad had posted US$120 million because of its larger share of both the concession area and MWSS' old debts, and Manila Water posted US$80 million.

=== Water resources ===
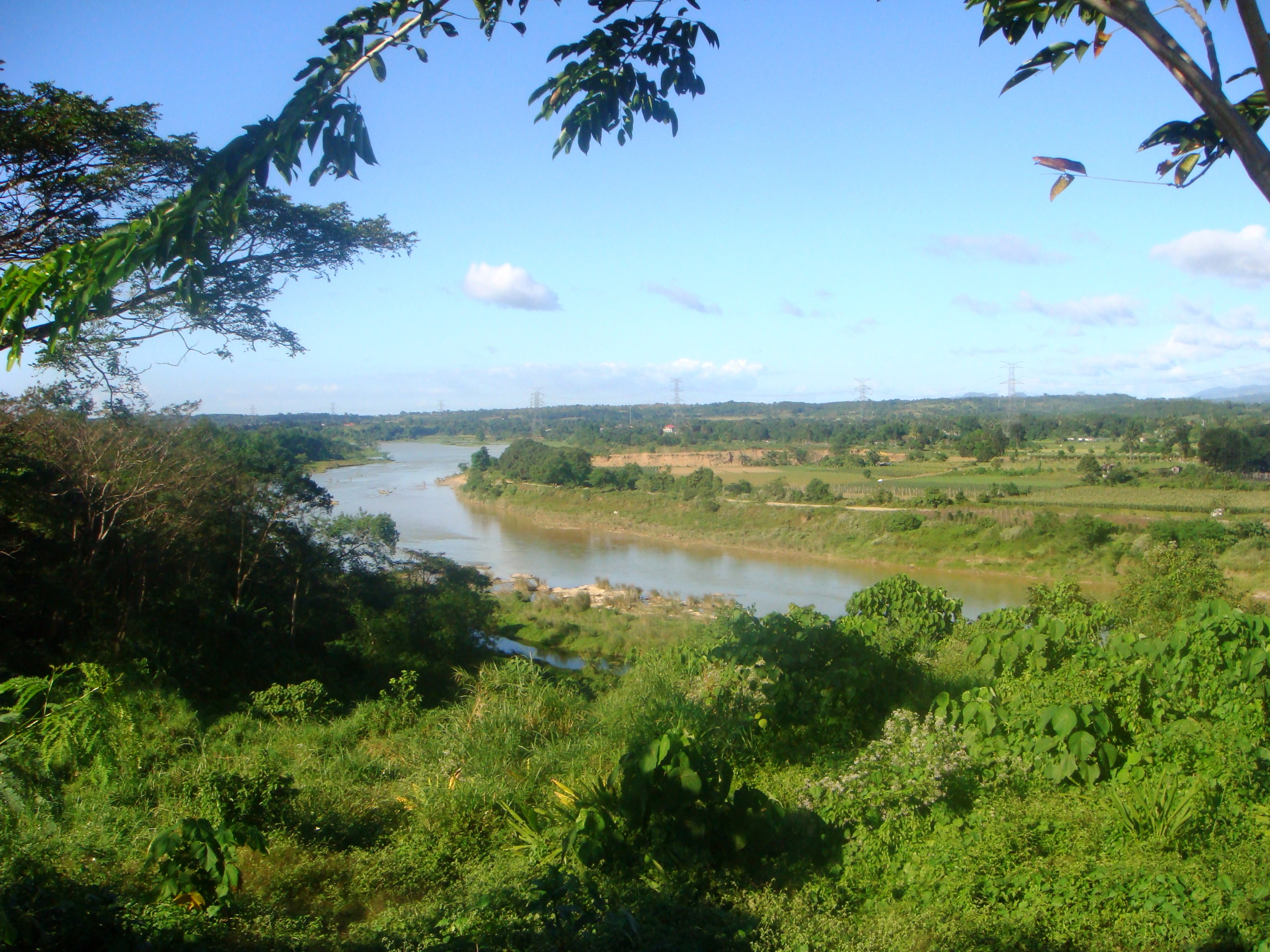
The Angat River is the main source of drinking water for Metro Manila.

98 percent of the water used in Metro Manila comes from the Angat Dam about 40 km to the northeast of Manila, a multipurpose dam that is also used for irrigation and hydropower generation. From Angat Dam, water flows through the Angat River to the much smaller Ipo Dam from where it is diverted through tunnels to the La Mesa Basins. From these basins, about 60 percent of the water is provided to West Manila and 40 percent to East Manila, where the respective water companies treat the raw water. In West Manila, Maynilad treats up to 2.4 million cubic meters per day in its Mesa 1 and Mesa 2 treatment plants. In East Manila, Manila Water treats up to 1.7 million cubic meters per day in its Balara treatment plant.

Except in times of extended drought, Angat Dam supplies 4.1 million cubic meters per day of water for Metro Manila. Per capita water consumption in Metro Manila is about 100 liter per day. Even if one assumes 50 percent water distribution losses, Angat Dam can supply more than 20 million inhabitants, compared to a current population of 12 million. However, during severe droughts the water supply is insufficient. For example, during the drought of 1998 water supply to Metro Manila had to be reduced by 30 percent and water supply for irrigation was completely cut. Therefore, since the mid-1990s MWSS has pursued the construction of a new dam, the Laiban Dam, to supply Manila with water. Besides the need to hedge against the risk of drought, this is being justified with projected increased domestic per capita demand and projected increased commercial and industrial water demand. Civil society groups oppose the dam, saying that it is not needed, it would cause social and environmental damage, and that MWSS is "obsessed" with the dam. The construction of the dam has been repeatedly delayed for lack of funding.

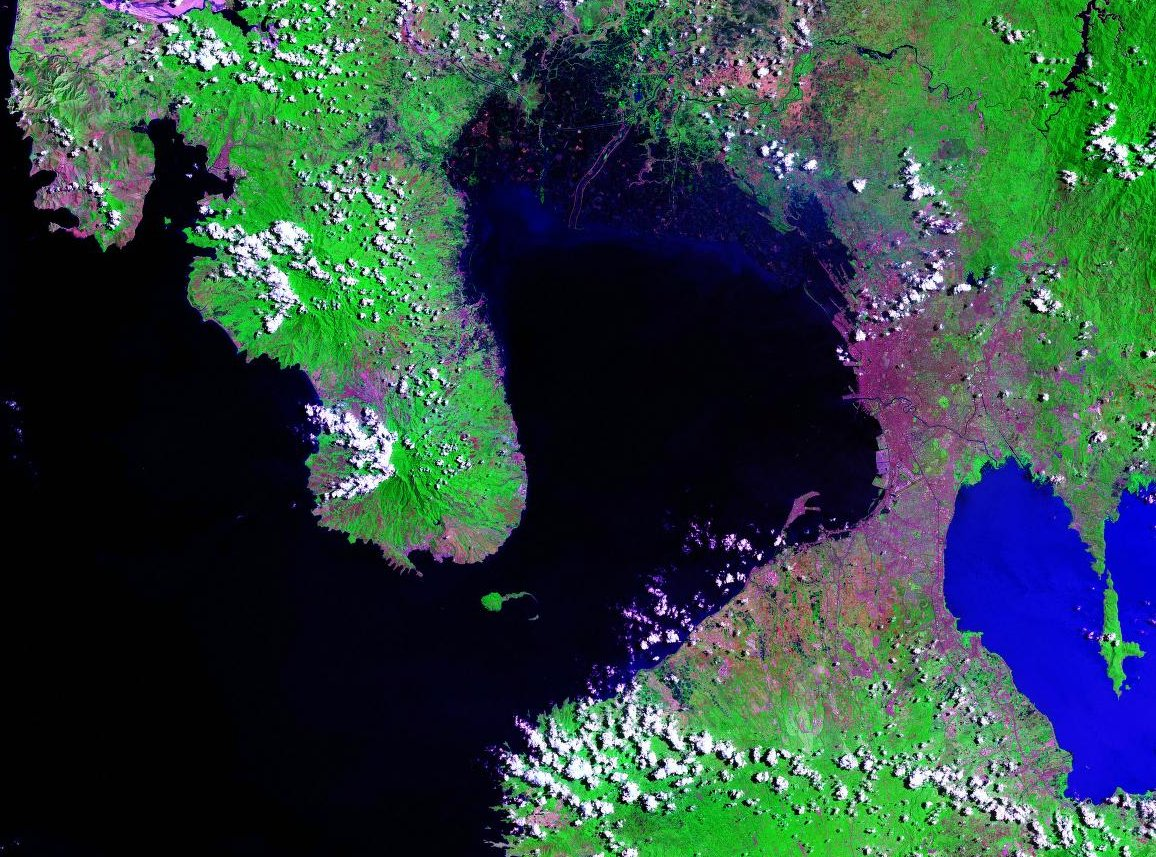
Satellite picture of Manila, showing Manila Bay to the left and Laguna Lake to the right.

Maynilad began to diversify its water sources by tapping into Laguna Lake, a large but polluted lake to the east of Manila. In February 2011, the President of the Philippines, Benigno Aquino, inaugurated the 0.1 million cubic meter per day multistage treatment plant, the first drinking water treatment plant to draw water from the lake. The plant aimed to supply 1.2 million residents in the south of the metropolitan area. Manila Water also planned to tap into the lake to complement the water supply of the quickly growing Rizal area to the north. This was presented as a measure to adapt to climate change, since it will reduce the dependence on the Angat River, which is vulnerable to drought. At the same time, together with NGOs, Manila Water planted trees covering more than 300 hectares of land in the Ipo and Marikina watersheds to protect its main current water source.

== Development of the concessions ==
=== Before privatization ===
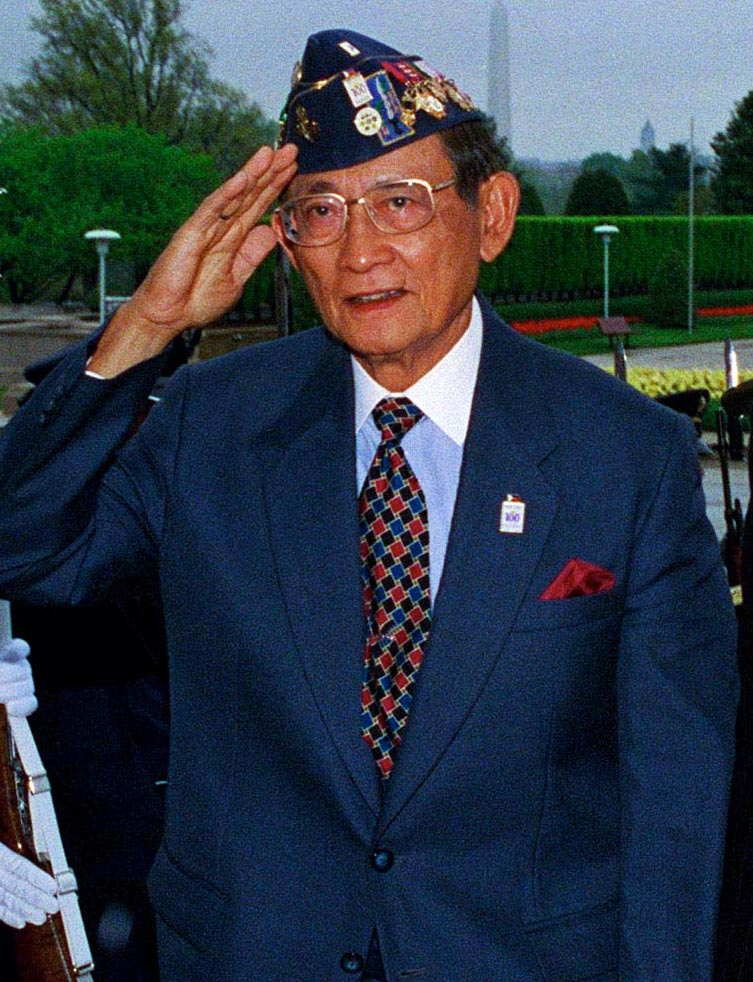
President Fidel Ramos suggested that what he called the "water crisis" in Metro Manila should be solved by involving the private sector.

Before privatization, the Metropolitan Waterworks and Sewerage System (MWSS) provided water for on average 16 hours every day to two thirds of Metro Manila. It was also inefficient, overstaffed and suffering from very high water losses. According to the Asian Development Bank, the amount of non-revenue water (NRW) (water supplied but not billable e.g. due to leakage and illegal connections) was more than 60 percent; this was much higher than in Seoul (35 percent), Kuala Lumpur (36 percent) and Bangkok (38 percent), and only comparable to Jakarta. Tariffs were low and MWSS was dependent on subsidies that the government was keen to abolish. The utility was saddled with debts of US$800 million owed to the Asian Development Bank, the World Bank and the Japan Bank for International Cooperation. Manila residents had become accustomed to poor water service in Manila and did not feel a strong urge to change the situation, especially because water tariffs were very low.

According to a book by Mark Dumol, a senior civil servant in charge of the privatization, President Fidel Ramos insisted in 1994 that there was a "water crisis" in Manila at a time when no one else spoke about a water crisis. Ramos began to convince others that there was a water crisis, which increased political support for privatization.

=== Preparation for privatization (1994–97) ===
The government of Corazon Aquino had initiated a wide-ranging privatization programme selling 122 companies for US$2 billion in 1986-1992. When Fidel Ramos succeeded her he broadened the privatization program to infrastructure, resolving an electric power crisis through rapid private investments in power plants in 1992-94. Based on this perceived success, Ramos asked his Secretary of Public Works and Transport Gregorio Vigilar to apply the same approach to resolve the water problems of Manila.

In June 1994, the British company Biwater and a Malaysian firm approached Ramos with an unsolicited proposal to buy MWSS. The government refused, because by law MWSS could not be sold; it was open to the idea of a public-private partnership, such as a concession contract under which the government would retain ownership of the assets. The Filipino government wanted to select the private partner on a competitive basis. Among the interested companies were the two largest French international water companies, Conpagnie Générale des Eaux and Lyonnaise des Eaux. The French embassy and Lyonnaise des Eaux told the government about what they presented as the success of the water privatization in Buenos Aires where Lyonnaise had won a concession in 1993 and competitive bidding had initially reduced water tariffs below their previous level under government management. Lyonnaise brought government officials to Macao, where it had reduced water losses. The officials also visited France and England.

In 1995, the "Water Crisis Act" was passed, providing the legal framework for a public-private partnership, which was to take the form of concession contracts. the water service area in Manila was divided in two zones, to facilitate performance comparisons ("benchmarking"), based on the model of Paris which at that time was served by two private water companies. There was debate about the decision to split the service area as it was complicated, including personnel, assets and the customer database. It brought benefits and caused "huge complications" according to one of the government's lead negotiators, Mark Dumol.

The two concession contracts were for 25 years and included targets concerning coverage and service quality. One objective was to increase water coverage in Metro Manila to 96 percent by 2006, another to increase access to sewerage to 66 percent in West Manila, and 55 percent in East Manila by the end of the concessions. There were no contractual targets to increase efficiency; the companies' financial models used to set the tariffs in their bids assumed a rapid reduction of water losses and a reduction in staffing levels. The two concession holders were to inherit the debt of MWSS; the debt was not shared equally between the two concessions. Because the Western concession was considered more dense and more prosperous, 90 percent of the debt was assigned to it. The concessions were awarded through international competitive bidding, with the International Finance Corporation (IFC) of the World Bank Group advising the government on the design and bidding of the two concession contracts.

The concessionaires were expected to be regulated by the newly created MWSS regulatory office, but its role remained ambiguous. While some office members expected to actively monitor and control the private companies, its first chief, Rex Tantiongco, insisted that it was part of the utility, to implement decisions agreed to between the MWSS Board of Trustees and the concessionaires. The regulatory office was staffed to a large extent with employees of the former government-owned and controlled utility.

In August 1996, tariffs were increased by 38 percent to set them at the "correct level" prior to privatization. The increase was delayed for political reasons and implemented during a visit of the Mexican singer Thalia, who was famous in the Philippines. The media spotlight on Thalia was so intense that there was no complaint about the increase.

Zones of Metro Manila allocated to Maynilad Water (red) and Manila Water (blue)

=== Concession awards (1997) ===
The concessions would be awarded to the prequalified bidders submitting the lowest tariff, i.e. competitive bidding. The Filipino government expected efficiency gains to be so great, that water tariffs would go down, based on the 1993 experience of the Buenos Aires concession, despite the need to finance huge investments and to service legacy debt. Lowering tariffs was important for political acceptance, and the government included a provision that tariffs in the bids were not allowed to be higher than the tariffs at the time. Four prequalified bidders submitted eight bids, each bidding for both concessions. Each bidder was a joint venture between an international and a local company. If the same company submitted the lowest bid for both concessions, the second-lowest bidder would be awarded the other zone. On January 23, 1997, the financial bids were opened and one bidder submitted an extremely low bid of only 26 and 29 percent of the tariffs in East and West Manila respectively. Evaluators asked the company if the bid was serious, which the company, Manila Water led by the Filipino Ayala Group confirmed. Manila Water was the only company to submit a lower bid for East Manila than for West Manila. The Ayala group owned substantial real estate in East Manila and may have wanted be certain to win the Eastern concession. Three other companies submitted bids in the range of 50-60 percent of pre-privatization tariffs with slightly lower tariffs for West Manila compared to East Manila, reflecting their assumption that West Manila was more profitable to run, despite the fact that 90 percent of the legacy debt had been allocated to it.

The concessions were awarded to the following joint venture, taking effect in August 1997 :

- The Maynilad Water Services, Inc., a joint venture between the French Suez and the Filipino Benpres Holdings for the West Zone;
- the Manila Water Company, Inc., consisting of the Filipino Ayala Corporation with the British United Utilities, the U.S. company Bechtel, and Japanese Mitsubishi for the East Zone.

The financing relied extensively on the anticipated cash flow and debt with a low share of equity. Mark Dumol estimated that out of US$7 billion of investments only US$200 million, or less than 3 percent, had to be financed through equity. Since the service area was split in two and the foreign partners would shoulder much of the equity, local firms became very interested to participate when they were told of this arrangement: "Can you imagine having a significant share in a company that provided water to Metro Manila for only USD 10 million?", Dumol asked. It remains unclear how this low amount has been calculated, since it implicitly assumes that the foreign partner comes up with 90 percent of the equity and the local partner would come up with an unusually low 10 percent of the equity.

The prospects enticed some bidders to shoulder more financial responsibility than they could bear. The Benpres Group, the Filipino partner of Maynilad, was in a desperate financial situation when it entered the contract, providing little cushion for the first difficult years when much more equity was needed than anticipated. According to a study by the British NGO, WaterAid, both companies "appeared to have made particularly low bids, on poor foundations, with the assumption they would change the terms of the contract once it was won." Lyonnaise des Eaux has vehemently denied this, saying its bid was much higher than the extremely low bid submitted by Ayala, and that its bid was very close to the two other bids.

=== First five years (1997-2001) ===
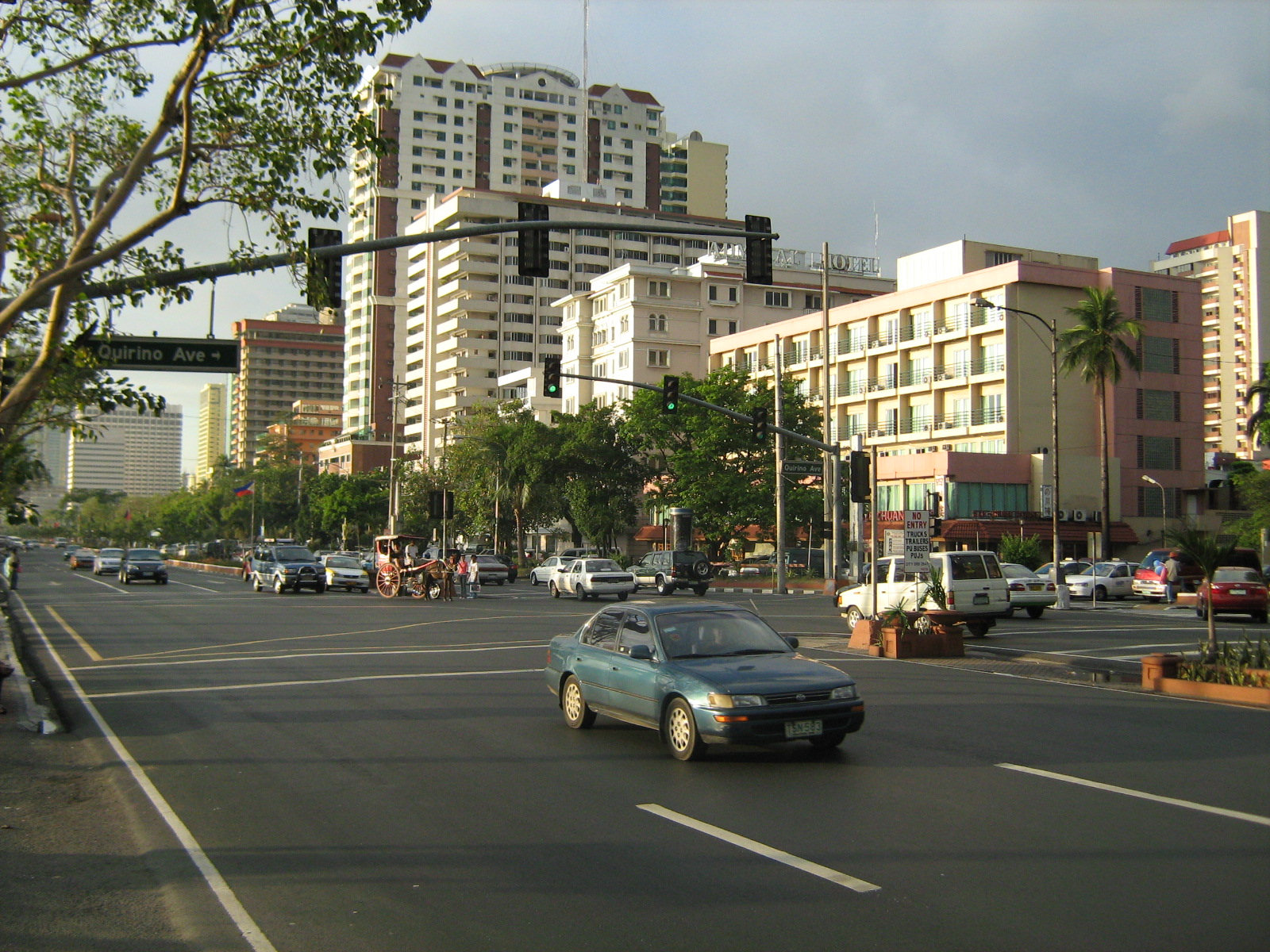
A view of Roxas Boulevard where the business hub of Manila city is located. Manila city is part of the Western water concession.

After the contract came into force, base tariffs initially decreased substantially from 8.6 Pesos/m3 in all areas to 5 Pesos/m3 in the Western zone, and only 2.3 Pesos/m3 in the Eastern Zone. In the first years, concessionaires were faced with both a severe drought and the Asian financial crisis. Their debt doubled, because of a rapid 50 percent devaluation of their Peso income, and legacy debts were denominated in foreign currency.

Maynilad incurred high costs, in part because it awarded contracts to affiliates of Suez without competitive bidding. It also brought in new staff from its mother company Benpres who were inexperienced in water supply, which led to tensions and reduced the motivation of incumbent staff. Maynilad thus invested in expanding access in the Western zone, but due to its business model and the heavy load of inherited foreign-currency debt it soon ran into financial difficulties. It slowed down its investments, and in April 2001 it stopped paying the concession fee to the government altogether. To avoid bankruptcy, the government had to provide bridge financing from state-owned Filipino banks to MWSS. International banks were unwilling to lend to Maynilad after the financial crisis, and the owners were not willing to inject more equity.

Manila Water, on the other hand, initially did not invest in system expansion in its Eastern Zone. It focused on reducing non-revenue water and initially borrowed only small amounts in local currency. It bid out works competitively and gained the trust of former MWSS employees who were trained in relevant fields. Only a few top positions were filled with outsiders seconded from its mother company Ayala or its foreign partners. Manila Water used a "territory management" approach to reduce non-revenue water, under which decentralized operating units were responsible for decisions about appropriate actions. Staff evaluation and compensation were linked to their performance. Despite its successful management Manila Water's concession could not survive based on the extremely low tariffs it had committed itself to charge. As early as 1998 Manila Water requested an increase of the 5.2 percent rate of return it had included in its own bid to calculate its tariff. The MWSS Regulatory Office refused to grant the increase. Manila Water then seized an international arbitration panel. The panel granted an increase to 9.3 percent, which resulted in a substantial tariff increase. Civil society groups criticized the decision, saying it undermined the integrity of the original bid at the expense of customers and competitors. Manila Water made a profit as early as 1999, gained the confidence of banks and could gradually increase its borrowing.

=== Tariff increases and reduction of performance targets (2001-02) ===
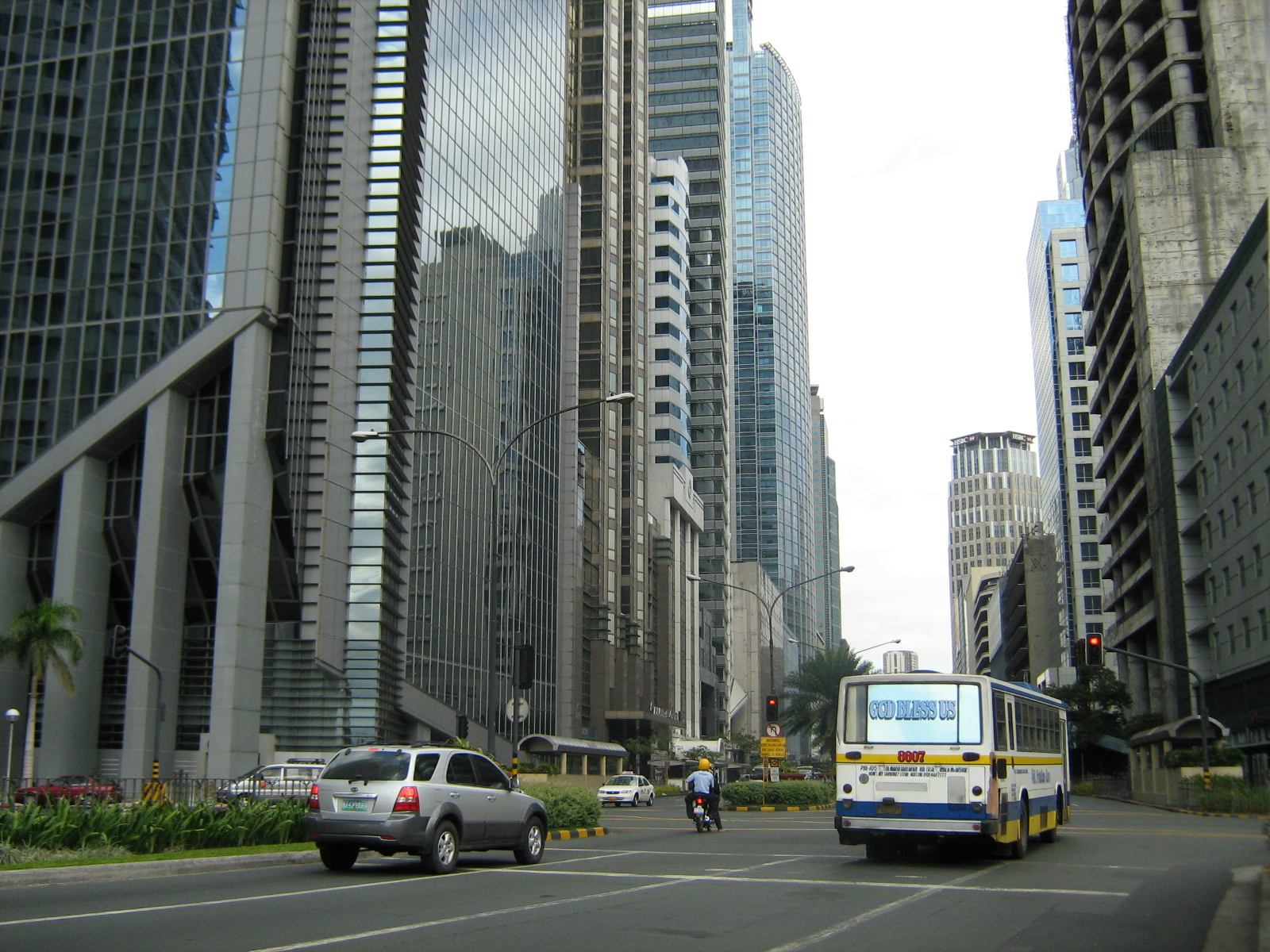
Ayala Avenue in the business district of Makati, East Manila, is named after the Ayala family that owns a conglomerate to which Manila Water belongs.

In 2001 a conflict erupted between various members of the MWSS regulatory office. The chief of the office, Rex Tantiongco, resigned in July 2001 after he failed to gain support from other members of the office for the approval of another tariff increase after the one granted by the Arbitration Panel. His successor, Herman Cimafranca, called the office a "toothless paper tiger". He said it had no role in approving tariff increases, as evidenced by the earlier referral to increase the rate of return to an arbitration panel and not to the regulatory office. In October 2001 the Board of MWSS approved the first amendment to the concession contracts. It allowed tariffs to be changed quickly as a result of on exchange rate fluctuations, instead of recovering losses from exchange rate fluctuations only through gradual adjustments. This led to another immediate tariff increase.

In 2002 the first regular "rate rebasing" was undertaken. The concession contract foresaw an adjustment of the water tariff every five years to take into account changes in the weighted cost of capital and in investment requirements. As a result, water tariffs were increased substantially for both concessions in 2002. The new tariffs exceeded their pre-privatization level, as measured in current Peso terms, but were significantly lower in dollar terms because of the 1997 devaluation. By 2003 tariffs had reached 11.4 Pesos in the Western zone and 10.1 Pesos/m3 in the Eastern zone. Initial targets concerning coverage and non-revenue water also were adjusted downwards with the agreement of the regulatory agency. A critical study of the two concessions concluded in 2002 that they both were a "failure" and a "corporate muddle, whereby the supposed benefits of private sector participation disappear, and government and public administrators are seemingly unable to prevent it." After the tariff increase of 2001 Manila Water began to invest in expanding the water network, including in poor neighborhoods, and achieved a significant increase in access.

=== Maynilad bankruptcy, Manila Water prospers (2003-2008) ===
Maynilad, however, was not satisfied with the result of the first amendment of the concession contract. It still refused to pay concession fees to MWSS, which the latter needed to repay its legacy debt. The amount of unpaid concession fees reached Pesos 5 billion. Eventually, in December 2002 Maynilad requested the early termination of the contract. Despite the tariff increases and the lowered targets, Maynilad went bankrupt in 2003. The government did not call on Maynilad's performance bond, but rather took on three new foreign currency loans with a total value of US$431 million to finance the MWSS debt service. The government agreed to convert a small part of the unpaid concession fees, US$22.67 million, into an 84 percent equity share of Maynilad. The bulk of the unpaid fees were to be repaid over a longer period.

The Filipino government neither returned West Manila to public management, nor accept Manila Water's offer to take over the entire metropolitan area, but offered its share in Maynilad for sale. In December 2006 a consortium of the Filipino construction company DM Consunji Holdings, Inc (DMCI) and the Filipino telecommunications/real estate company Metro Pacific Investments Corporation (MPIC) bought it for a low sales price of US$503.9 million. While many public tenders impose a high equity, this was not the case here. Also, the tender only required expertise in utilities management — including telecommunications and energy — not specifically water utilities management, which allowed a wider variety of bidders to come in. As of 20111, Suez continued to hold a 16 percent-minority share in Maynilad. By January 2008 the new owners had paid off the US$240 million debt to the government.

Manila Water improved its performance and increasingly gained the trust of investors and in 2003 the International Finance Corporation (IFC) provided a loan and took an equity stake in the company. This helped the initial public offering (IPO) of the company's shares on the Manila stock exchange in 2004, the first IPO since the East Asian financial crisis in 1997. In 2008, Manila Water issued the first local currency bond since the crisis.

=== Contract extension, Maynilad turnaround and Manila Bay cleanup (2009-2012) ===
In 2009, Manila Water's concession was extended until 2037 instead of just to 2022. Maynilad's new owners began to invest more heavily. Between 2007 and September 2011 the population served from increased 6.4 to 7.8 million, the share of customers with continuous water supply increased from 46 to 82 percent and non-revenue water decreased from 67 to 47 percent. In April 2010, Maynilad's concession was also extended until 2037. In June 2010, Maynilad's Chief Executive Rogelio Singson, who had overseen its turnaround since 2007, became Secretary of Public Works and Highways.

In December 2008 the Supreme Court of the Philippines ordered a number of government agencies, including MWSS and by extension the two concessionaires, to clean up Manila Bay. The Court called the bay "a dirty and slowly dying expanse mainly because of the abject official indifference of people and institutions". Following the court decision the concessionaires established ambitious investment plans for sewerage and wastewater treatment. In May 2012 the World Bank approved a US$275 million loan for a Metro Manila Wastewater Management Project. The loan was channeled to the two concessionaires through the Land Bank of the Philippines \.

=== Disputes about tariff increases (2012-2015) ===
For the 2013-2017 "rate rebasing process" the companies had requested price increases. However, in September 2013, the regulator MWSS ordered both companies to reduce their tariff. Manila Water and Maynilad were ordered to reduce tariffs by 29.47 percent and 4.82 percent respectively in five equal annual tranches over a period of five years, because "the utilities were unable to justify the need for higher rates based on their business and investment plans". The companies appealed against the decision at the International Chamber of Commerce which reversed the order against Maynilad in December 2014, allowing its tariffs to increase by 9.8 percent from 31.28 pesos (69 U.S. cents) per cubic meter, much less than the 28.3% increase initially requested by the company. Furthermore, there is disagreement about whether the companies can pass corporate income tax on to their customers. The companies claim that the government allowed them to do so back in 1997. However, the regulator MWSS blocked this part of the tariff increase and brought the issue to the Supreme Court of the Philippines for a final decision. oel Yu, chief regulator at MWSS, says that Manila Water’s return on equity is "in the region of 20%", while Maynilad’s is "in the region of 40%".

== Impact ==
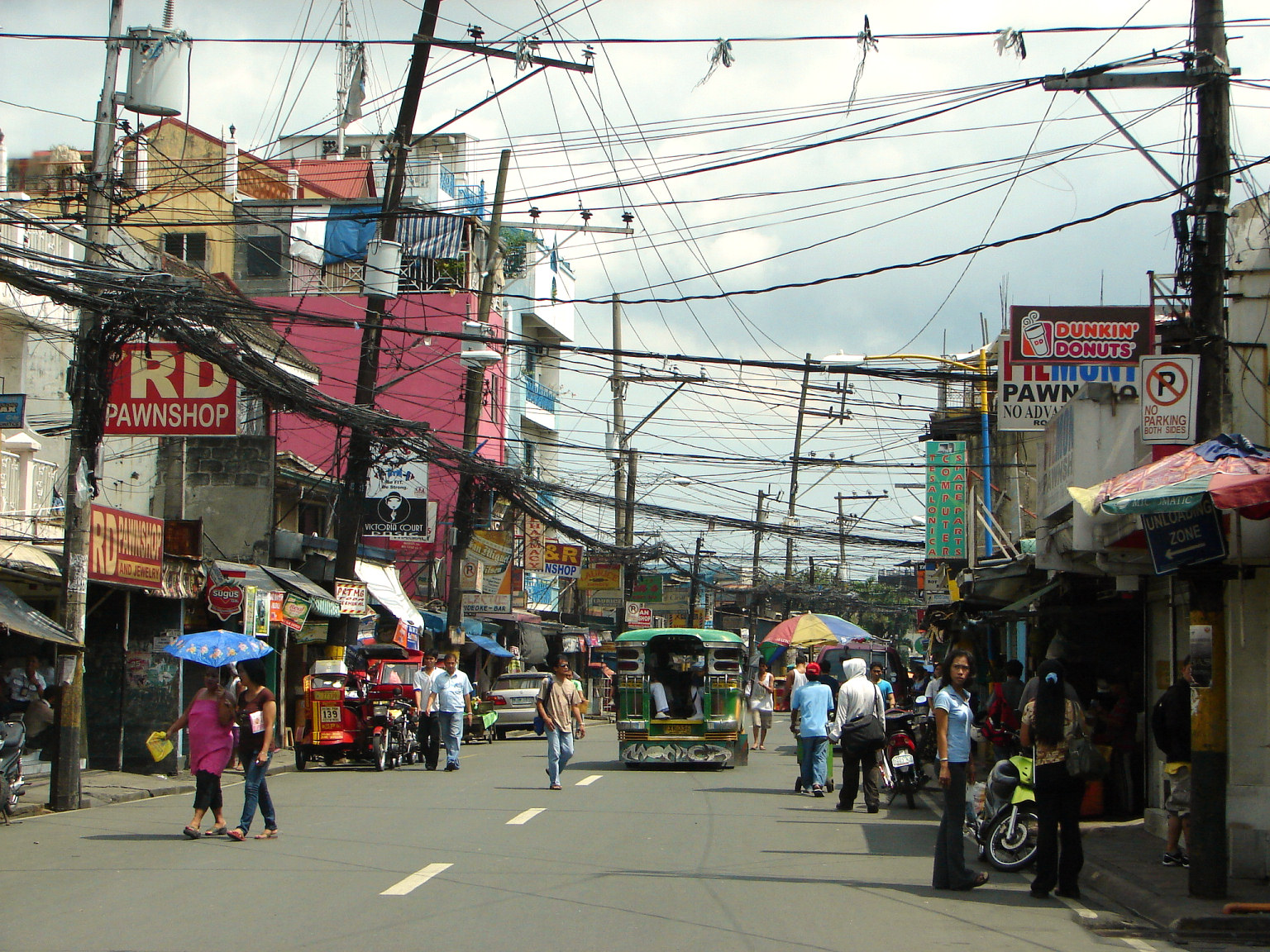
Street view of Pasig, one of the cities in the west Manila concession area.

Between 1997 and 2002 improvements in access were limited and water losses even increased in West Manila. However, subsequently performance improved in both halves of the city. As of 2009, access had increased substantially, and efficiency as well as service quality had also improved significantly. The improvements were faster and more significant in the Eastern Zone compared to the Western Zone. Both companies made efforts to reach the poor in slums. However, tariffs also increased significantly, improvements remained far below the contractual obligations. Almost no improvements were reached concerning sanitation.

=== Access to water ===
In East Manila between 1997 and the end of 2009 the population served more than doubled from 3 to 6.1 million (2009) and the share with access to piped water increased from 49 percent to 94 percent (2006). In West Manila, Maynilad claims to have connected 600,000 people to the water supply system until 2003, including many poor in slums. increased the share of customers with 24-hour water supply from 32 percent in 2007 to 71 percent in early 2011. The share of the population with access to piped water increased from 67 percent in 1997 to 86 percent in 2006. The initial contractual target had been 100 percent access by 2007.

=== Sanitation ===
Most residents of Manila discharge their wastewater into an estimated 2.2 million septic tanks. The concessionaires are obliged to empty these septic tanks. Manila Water operates 60 desludging trucks that empty septic tanks free of charge. The sludge is brought to two septage treatment plants. Maynilad also operates desludging trucks, but so far does not have a septage treatment plant.

As of 2010, the connection rate to sewage lines was 16 percent in West Manila and only 8 percent in East Manila. Wastewater is also discharged through open sewers that drain stormwater. 83 percent of the 2 million cubic meters of wastewater generated every day is not treated. Initially the concession contracts foresaw an increase of access to sewerage from less than 10 percent to 66 percent in West Manila and 55 percent in East Manila until 2021. This would have implied investments of more than US$1.8 billion, which would have resulted in a doubling of water tariffs. When faced with bankruptcy Maynilad had asked to reduce its target to 31 percent. The new targets for sewerage connection for West Manila are 14 percent by 2012; 31 percent by 2016; 66 percent by 2021; and 100 percent by 2037. For East Manila the targets are 30 percent coverage by 2012; 45 percent by 2016; 63 percent by 2021 and 100 percent by 2037.

As of 2012, Manila Water operates 36 mostly small wastewater treatment plants with a total capacity of 0.135 million cubic meters per day. Those small "package" treatment plants were designed to keep costs low. Manila Water presents them as an "innovative and unconventional solution". According to Manila Water, sludge from the plants is brought to a composting site in Central Luzon from where it is applied on land in a lahar-laden area in Tarlac province. Manila Water has a license to package biosolids from its wastewater treatment plants as soil conditioners. It plans to invest US$1 billion in sanitation between 2011 and 2018 to bring sewerage coverage to the contractual target. It had three large wastewater treatment plants under construction or bidding as of 2012, aiming to bring the total wastewater treatment capacity in its service area to 0.5 million cubic meters per day.

=== Water losses ===
In East Manila between 1997 and the end of 2009 non-revenue water ("water losses") declined from 63 percent to 16 percent according to Manila Water. However, loss reduction during the first years was far below what had been planned. The 31 percent level of water losses that Manila Water had planned to reach in only one year, was achieved only in 2005. The 16 percent target reached in 2009 had initially been envisaged to be reached in 2001, according to Manila Water's financial model used to bid for the concession. In West Manila, according to MWSS, non-revenue water actually increased during the first years of the concession from 64 percent in 1997 to 69 percent in 2002, compared to a target of 30 percent. By September 2011 it had been reduced to 47 percent, a level that still remains much higher than in East Manila.

=== Labor productivity and managerial innovations ===
Labor productivity of Manila Water increased substantially, as evidenced by a decline of the number of staff per 1000 connections from 9.8 to only 1.4. Before the concessions were awarded, according to the Asian Development Bank, MWSS had been one of the most overstaffed utilities in Asia, with four times more employees per connection than the water utility of Singapore. During the preparation of the privatization, the government reduced the number of staff significantly through measures agreed to with the labor unions. In a first step, 30 percent of employees took early retirement taking advantage of a compensation plan. In a second step, all remaining employees were actually terminated and received severance pay, only to be rehired for a probation period by the private companies. Those who were not retained after the probation received full early retirement benefits. Further improvements in labor productivity were achieved during the concession by increasing the number of connections without hiring new employees. Manila Water also modernized management practices focused on their employees, which made it the first Filipino company to win the 2011 Asian Human Capital award.

=== Service quality and customer satisfaction ===
The concession contracts obliged the private companies to achieve an uninterrupted water supply at a pressure level of 16 pound per square inch (1.1 bar), enough to bring water up to 11 meter above ground without additional pumping. They also required compliance with drinking water and effluents standards by the year 2000. These targets were not achieved, but there were notable improvements. For example, in East Manila between 1997 and the end of 2009 the share of customers with continuous water supply increased from 26 percent to more than 98 percent. In West Manila it increased from 46 percent in 2007 to 82 percent in September 2011. The percentage of people judging Manila Water's performance as "very good" increased from 28 percent to 100 percent, according to a survey by the University of the Philippines. A 2000 survey by MWSS had shown that in both halves of the concession 33 percent of residents had perceived an improvement in service, while 12 percent said that service has worsened, with 55 percent stating it had remained unchanged since privatization.

In West Manila, after Maynilad's ownership changed in 2007, the company increased its investments. One of the results is that the share of customers that enjoys 24-hour water supply increased from 32 percent in 2007 to 71 percent in early 2011. The share of customers that receive water with a pressure of more than 7 pounds per square inch - which is less than half the pressure required by the concession contract - increased from 53 percent in 2007 to 95 percent in September 2011.

=== Reaching the poor ===
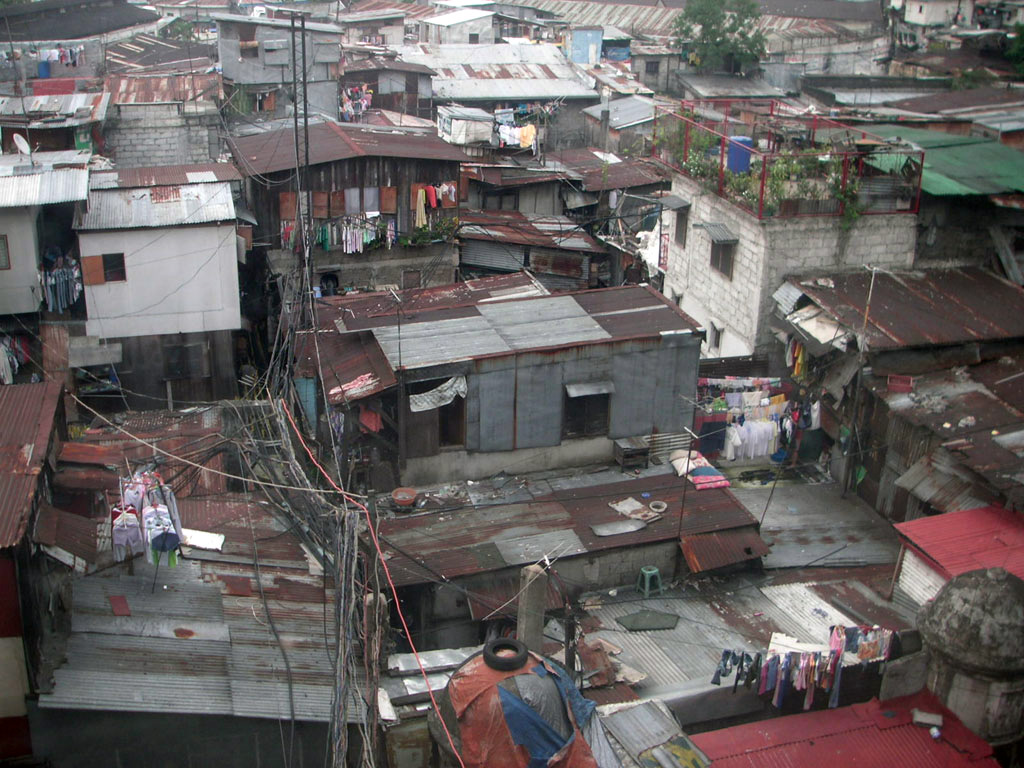
Slum in Manila near Manila City Jail in the western half of the metropolitan area. Utilities are not allowed to provide services directly to residents in illegally built areas. Nevertheless, ways have been found to overcome this challenge.

Many poor in Manila do not have access to piped water supply because the land where they live is occupied illegally and the private utilities are thus not allowed to connect them to the network. However, innovative solutions have been found to overcome this problem.

In East Manila, Manila Water's approach to connect poor communities usually involved no pipes inside the communities, but included a single bulk meter for up to 100 households. It was the responsibility of the community to connect its members and any losses beyond the bulk meter were not incurred by the utility.

In West Manila, Maynilad initiated early attempts to connect the poor in slums through the construction of piped networks by a small local company called IWADCO (Inpart Waterworks and Development Company) using its own funds and buying water in bulk from the utilities. Local banks initially refused to lend to the company even when it already had 25,000 paying customers. A NGO called Streams of Knowledge, which is associated with the Philippine Center for Water and Sanitation and was supported by UNDP, helped to set up the arrangement together with the local government and Maynilad which provides water at a discounted bulk rate. Users pay their water bills to water coordinators from the respective communities, which in turn pay Streams, which in turn pays a salary to the coordinator, pays the bulk water bill and returns part of the funds to the community. Maynilad built the piped network only to supply points at the entry of narrow alleys, from where residents distributed it among themselves with rubber hoses. A connection fee of 5000 Pesos (about US$90) was paid in instalments, resulting in monthly payments of about 200 Pesos (US$3.70) per household. This was about four times less than what the poor had paid to water vendors before. Maynilad pursued an approach to connect poor communities that included laying pipes in slums, which made it difficult to control theft. Indeed, non-revenue water even increased in West Manila.

Tariffs charged to many of the poor remained higher than for residential customers who lived in single-family houses. Homeowners' associations and community groups, including those living in slums, are charged the highest residential block rate for bulk water provision, which is about three times the lowest block rate.

=== Tariff increases ===
As mentioned before, the two concessionnaires submitted bids with tariffs that were much lower than the previous tariffs: 26 percent of the previous tariffs in the East Manila and 57 percent in West Manila. In West Manila the average tariff for all customer groups (base tariff) was 5 Pesos/m3 and in East Manila it was only 2.3 Pesos/m3, compared to 8.6 Pesos/m3 before the concession. Tariffs remained close to these low levels for five years until the first rate rebasing took place in 2002, followed by further significant tariff increases, as shown in the table below.

Evolution of average nominal water tariff in Manila in Pesos per cubic meter and as a share of 1996 tariffs after adjustment for inflation

Year	West Manila	East Manila	Consumer Price Index (2005=100)	West Manila as a share of 1996 real tariff	East Manila as a share of 1996 real tariff
1996	8.6	8.6	60.6	100%	100%
1997	5.0	2.3	64	55%	25%
2000	6.5	4.5	77	59%	41%
2002	20	14.5	84.8	166%	204%
2004	30	18	92.9	228%	137%
2008	32	27	119.4	189%	159%
2014	31.28	?	?	?	?

Sources:

- Nominal tariffs are from: Freedom from Debt Coalition (March 2009): "Recalibrating the Meter", p. 23.
- Consumer Price Index (CPI) figures are from indexmundi: Philippines - consumer price index.
- The percentage of 1996 real tariffs is calculated by first dividing the nominal tariff with the CPI and then dividing the resulting tariff for each year with the real tariff for 1996.

By the end of 2008 the tariff was, in real terms, 89 percent higher than the pre-privatization tariff in the West Manila and 59 percent higher in East Manila. The average tariff for all customer groups, including commercial customers that are being charged a higher tariff than residential customers, was 32 Pesos/m3 (US$0.71/m3) in East Manila and 27 Pesos/m3 in West Manila (US$0.60/m3) at the beginning of 2008. This compares to an average tariff of US$0.70/m3 in Jakarta (2005) and US$1.62/m3 in Singapore (2010).

Residential tariffs are much lower than the average tariff that also includes commercial users. A residential bill for a consumption of 30 cubic meters per month, including an environmental charge and value-added tax, was 395 Pesos (US$10) or 13 Pesos/m3 (US$0.33/m3) as of 2008. A residential water bill for the same consumption in West Manila was 489 Pesos/m3 (US$12) or 16 Pesos/m3 (US$0.39/m3). A residential water bill for a minimal consumption of 10 cubic meter per month, however, is only 109 Pesos (US$2.60), corresponding to only US$0.09/m3. For poor customers of Maynilad, this tariff is further reduced by 40 percent as of January 2012. Manila Water provides water for free to some institutions such as schools, hospitals, jails, and orphanages under its Lingap Projects.

Connection fees for water or sewer connections also increased substantially. For example, the residential connection fee increased from Pesos 3,722 in 2000 to Pesos 7,187 in 2008 in the East zone.

== See also ==
- Water privatization
- Remunicipalization
- Water supply and sanitation in the Philippines
