= La Mesa Ecopark =

Park in Quezon City, Philippines

- La Mesa Resort Zone
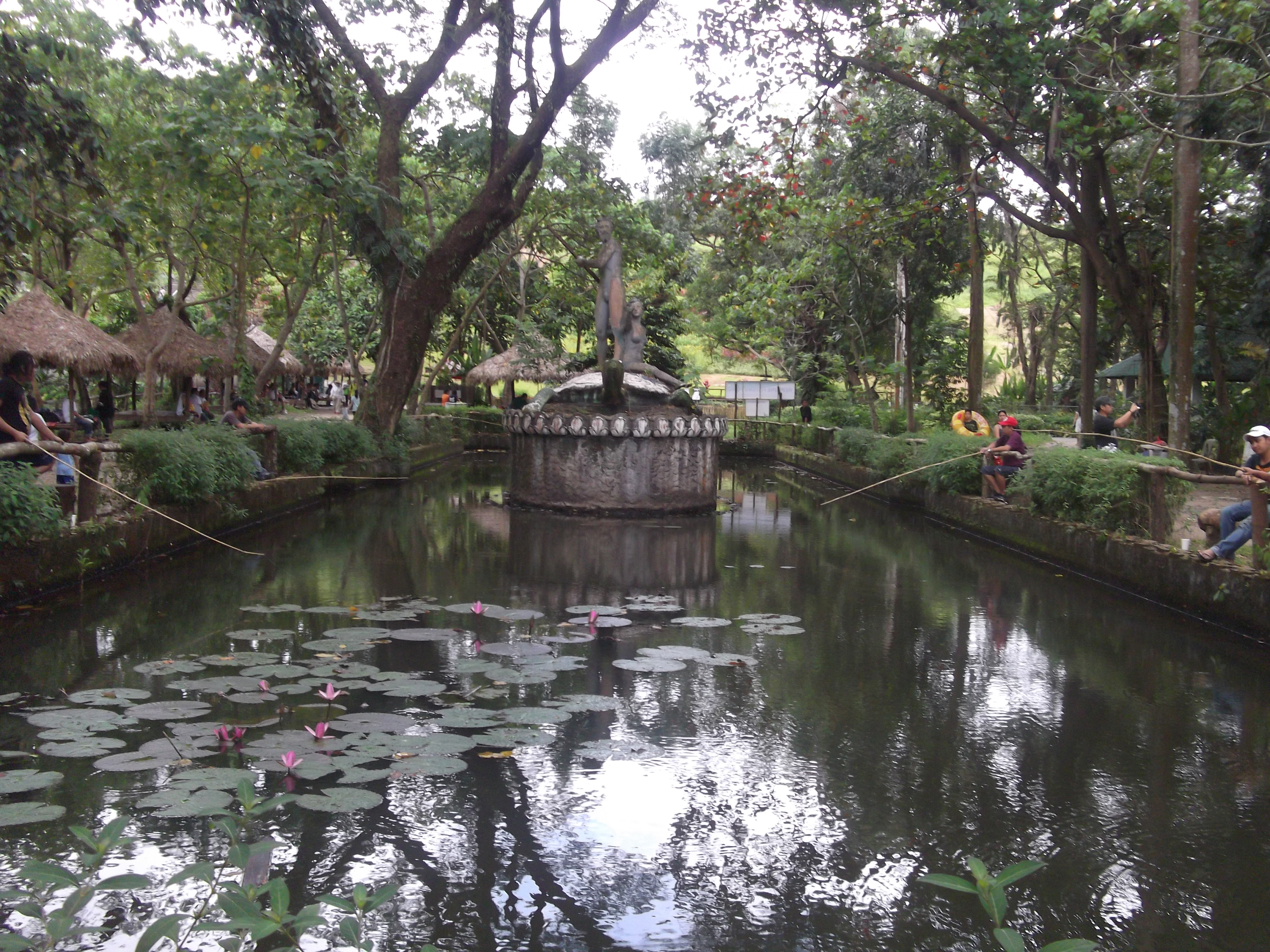
- The ecopark pond in November 2011

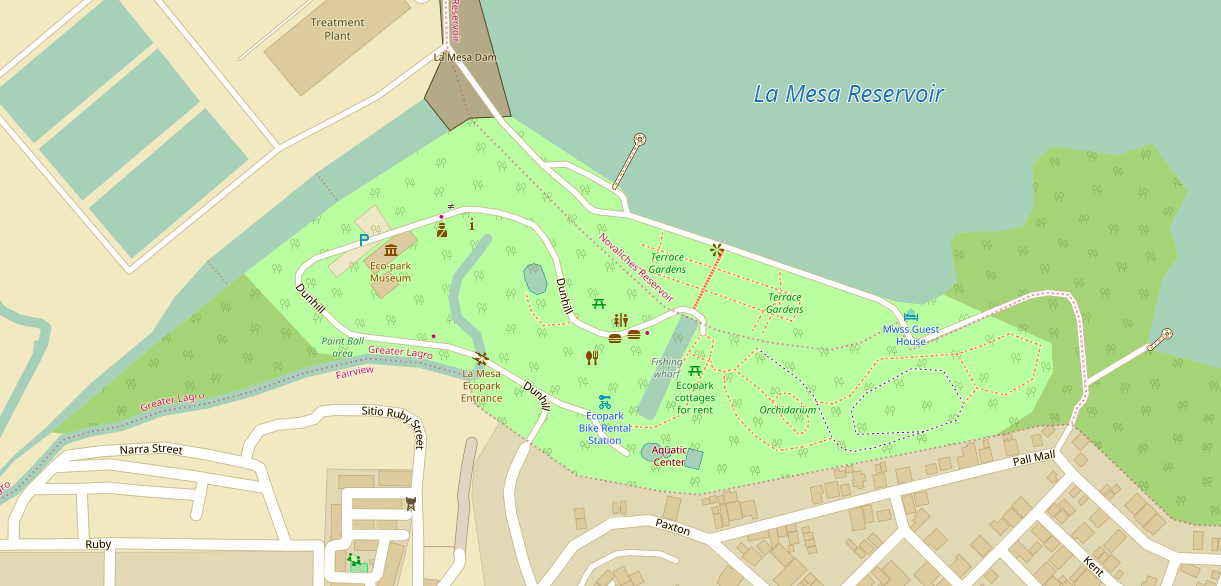
- Approximate boundaries of La Mesa Ecopark are shown in light green.
- Location: East Fairview, Greater Lagro, Quezon City, Metro Manila, the Philippines
- Coordinates: 14°42′43″N 121°04′27.5″E
- Area: 33 hectares (82 acres)
- Opened: 1950s
- Founder: Metropolitan Waterworks and Sewerage System
- Etymology: La Mesa Watershed Reservation
- Owner: Quezon City Parks Development and Administration Department
- Operator: La Mesa Ecopark Administration; Manila Water Foundation; ABS-CBN Foundation (former operator)
- Visitors: 280,000 (in 2011)
- Website: former Facebook page

The La Mesa Ecopark is a public park located in Greater Lagro, Quezon City, Metro Manila, Philippines. It is in the La Mesa Watershed Reservation and near the La Mesa Dam.

The park closed temporarily on February 12, 2024 after the ABS-CBN Foundation returned management of the park to the Metropolitan Waterworks and Sewerage System. It is partially reopened on June 29, 2024 under the management of the Manila Water Foundation.

== History ==
Covering an area of 33 hectares (82 acres) the public park is located along the natural boundary of the La Mesa Watershed Reservation and its elevation is about 40 metres (130 ft) below than the reservoir.

After years of neglect, the park underwent a renovation starting in 1999 under the "Save La Mesa Watershed Project", a collaboration between ABS-CBN Foundation's Bantay Kalikasan, the Metropolitan Waterworks and Sewerage System (MWSS) and the local government of Quezon City. A fund amounting to ₱247 million was raised for the rehabilitation of the park. It was reopened on April 28, 2004 and was renamed as "La Mesa Ecopark".

In 2019, it was proposed that the park be renamed as Gina Lopez Ecopark to commemorate ABS-CBN Foundation chairperson Gina Lopez who in 1999 established Bantay Kalikasan which had a role in the ecopark's rehabilitation.

In 2024, the ABS-CBN Foundation announced that it was returning management of the park to the MWSS on February 15. Employees would be laid off and the park along with the Nature Reserve would be temporarily closed.

On April 8, 2024, the MWSS announced that the park would reopen in June. The MWSS approved the takeover of the Ecopark's management by Manila Water through its social development arm, Manila Water Foundation. The park partially reopened on June 29, 2024.

== Facilities ==
Among the activities in the park are hiking, mountain-biking, horseback riding, rappelling, zip-lining, fishing, and paddle-boating in the lagoon. The park also has an "Ecotrail" and an vivarium specifically an orchidarium.

The park also hosts a swimming complex which opened in 2011. The previous one was destroyed by Typhoon Ondoy in September 2009. According to a 2011 report, the park had 280,000 visitors in a year.

== Gallery ==
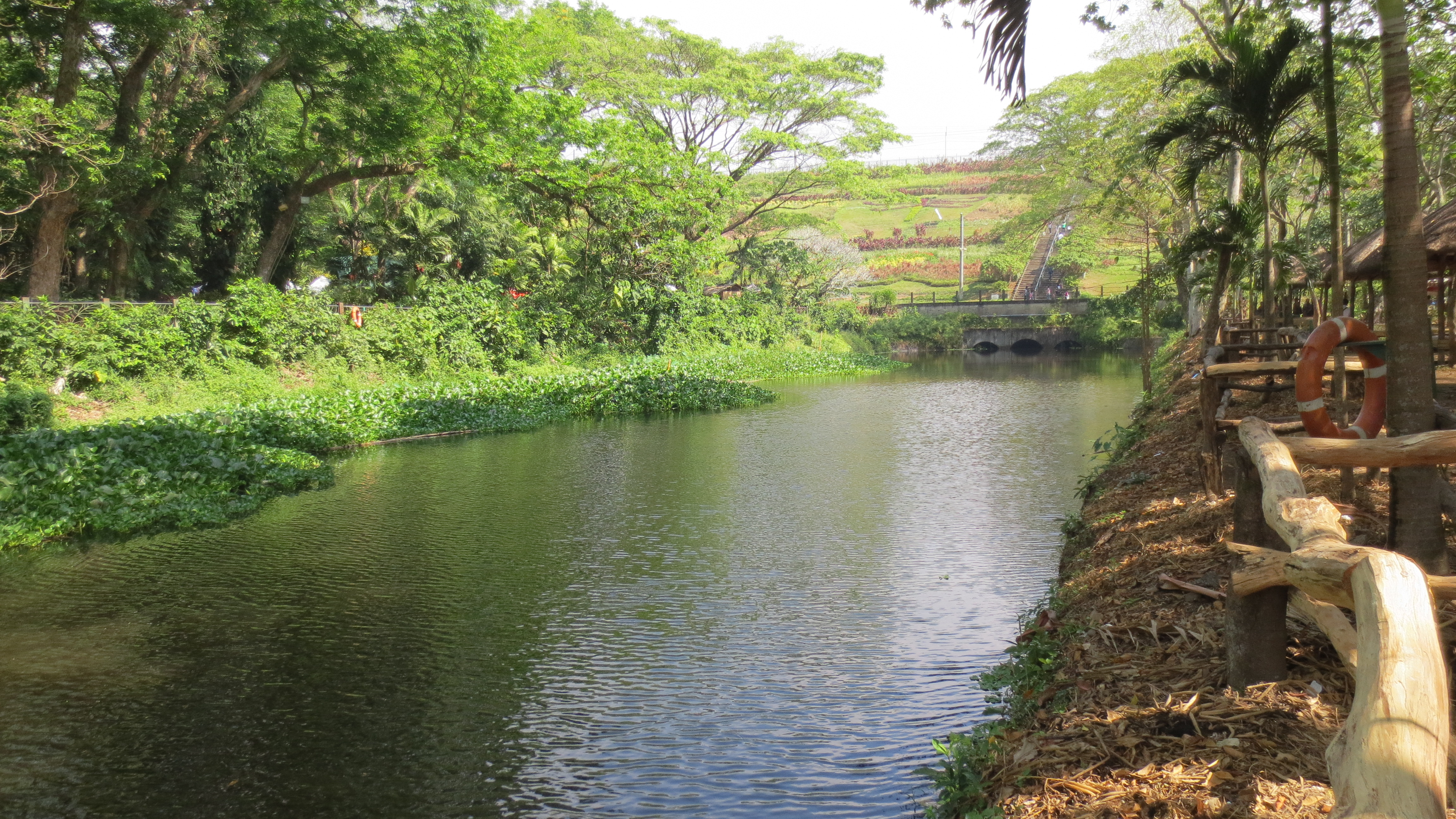
La Mesa Ecopark pond, February 2014

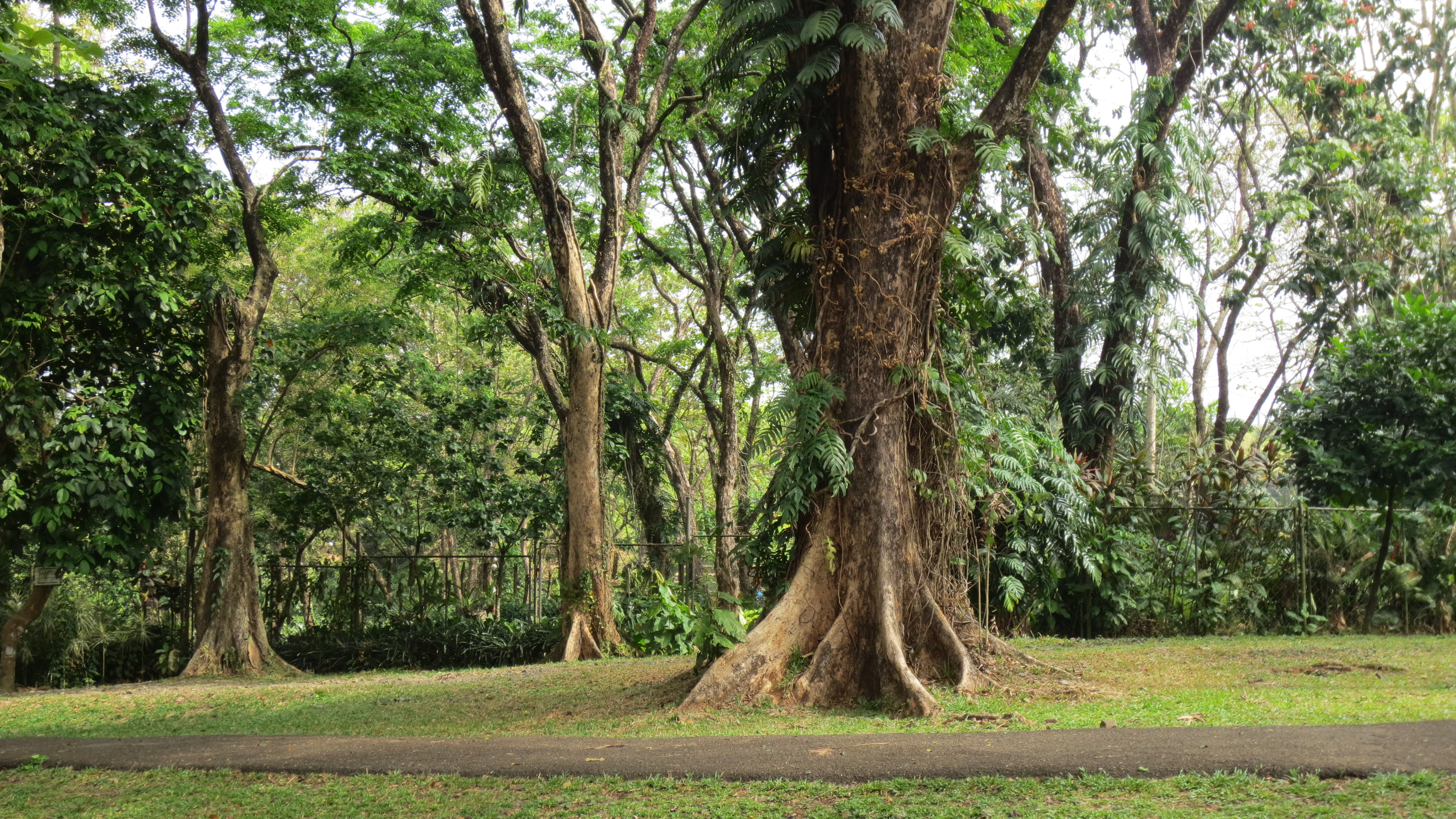
A bike loop inside the eco park

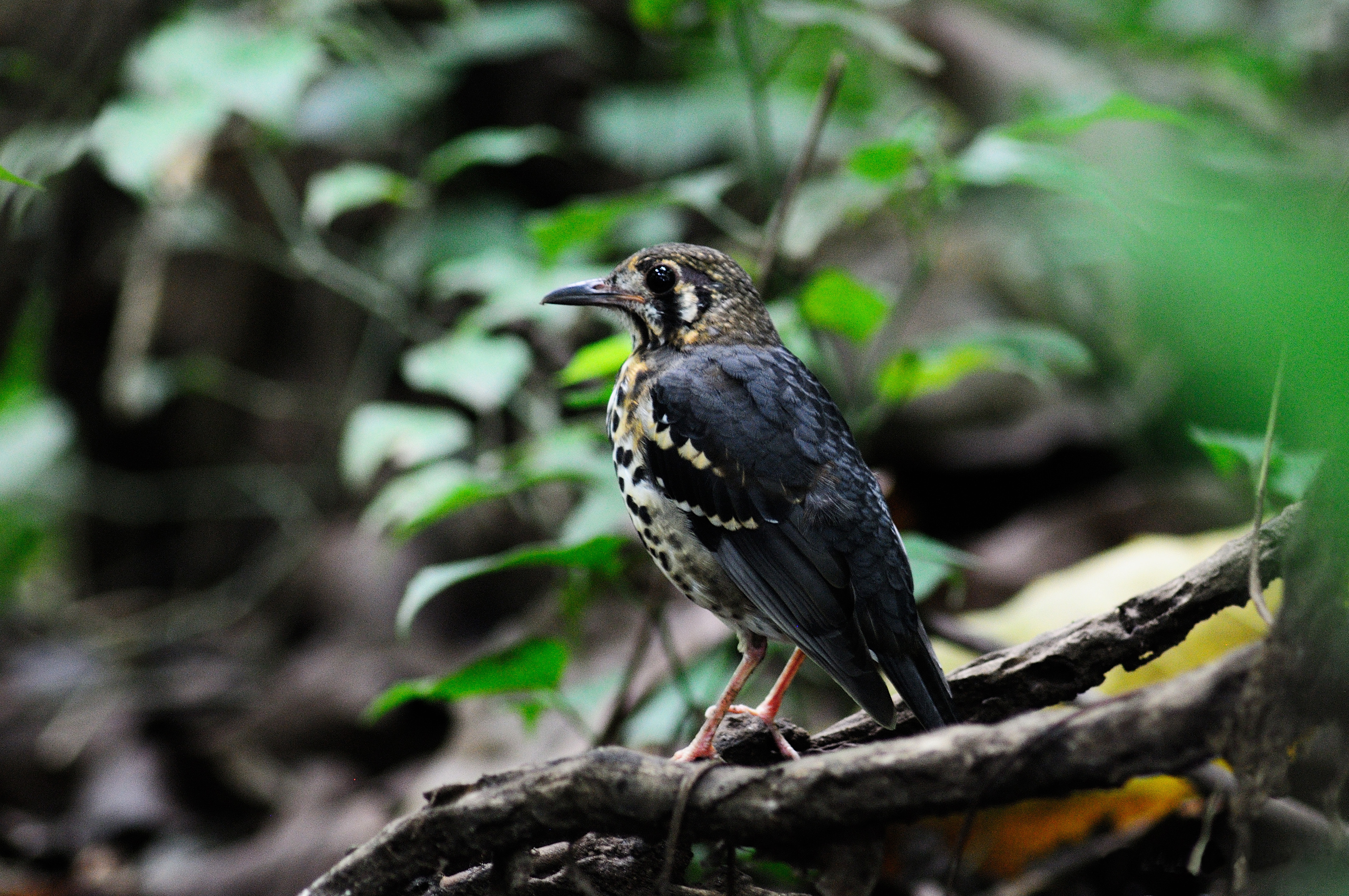
An ashy ground thrush (Geokichla cinerea) endemic to the Philippines, captured in November 2013 inside the eco park
