= CAMANA Water Reclamation Facility =

- Interactive map of the CAMANA Water Reclamation Facility area
- Etymology: From the cities of Caloocan, Malabon, Navotas (CAMANA)

General information
- Status: Under-construction
- Type: Sewage treatment plant
- Location: Dagat-dagatan Avenue Ext., Brgy. Maypajo, Caloocan, Philippines
- Coordinates: 14°38′15″N 120°58′10″E
- Groundbreaking: 2019
- Construction started: 2021
- Estimated completion: 2024
- Cost: ₱10.5 billion ($207 million)
- Owner: Maynilad

Design and construction
- Engineer: JFE Engineering Corporation
- Main contractor: DM Consunji Inc. (DMCI)

The Caloocan–Malabon–Navotas (CAMANA) Water Reclamation Facility is a sewage treatment plant under-construction in Caloocan, Metro Manila, Philippines. If completed, it will become the largest sewage treatment plant in the Philippines with a capacity to process 205 million liters (54,000,000 U.S. gal) of used water daily.

The groundbreaking ceremony for the CAMANA Water Reclamation Facility project of Maynilad was held in November 2019, but actual construction was announced to have started in March 2021. The project is an expansion of the existing 26 MLD Dagat-Dagatan Sewage Treatment Plant which was built in the 1980s. Manila Water contracted DM Consunji Inc. (DMCI) to work on the expansion. Japanese firm JFE Engineering Corporation is also involved in the project.

The sewage treatment plant is intended to serve the southern exclave of Caloocan, Malabon and Navotas which is within the scope of Maynilad's west zone. It is expected to become operational in 2024.
