= Marikina North Sewage Treatment Plant =

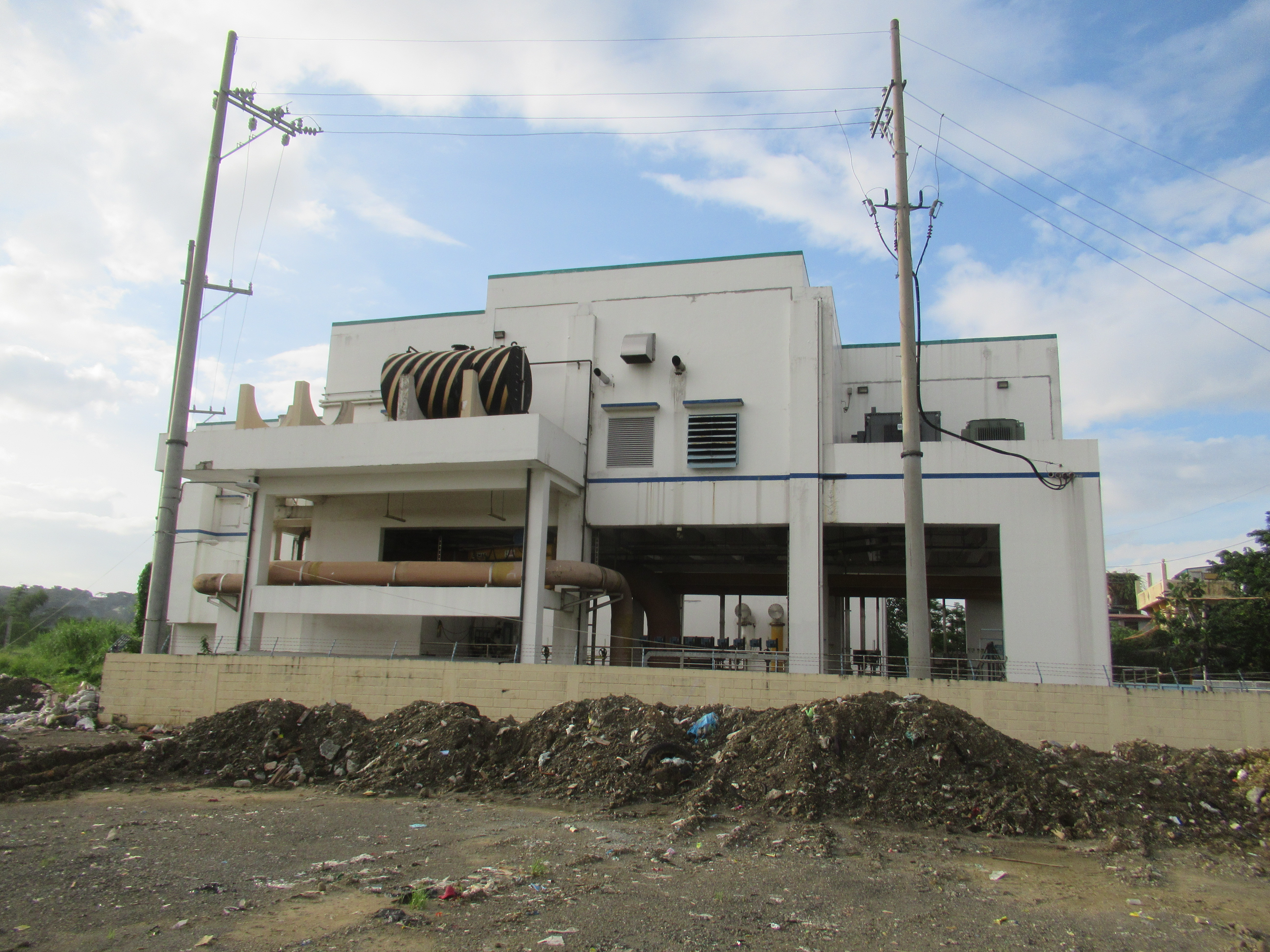
- Interactive map of the Marikina North Sewage Treatment Plant area

General information
- Status: Completed
- Type: Sewage treatment plant
- Location: Balubad Resettlement Area, Marikina, Philippines
- Coordinates: 14°40′02.2″N 121°06′02.0″E
- Elevation: 26.5 m (87 ft)
- Inaugurated: November 24, 2016
- Cost: ₱2.7 billion
- Owner: Manila Water

Technical details
- Grounds: 2 hectares (4.9 acres)

The Marikina North Sewage Treatment Plant is a sewage treatment plant in Marikina, Metro Manila, Philippines. Managed by Manila Water, the facility is one of several sewage treatment plant in the Philippines processing 100 million liters (26,000,000 U.S. gal) of used water daily.

It is situated in the Balubad Resettlement Area in Barangay Nangka in Marikina. Aside from Marikina, the sewage treatment plant also covers the town of San Mateo in Rizal and other nearby areas. It is built on a 2 hectares (4.9 acres) land with an elevation of 26.5 meters (87 ft) above ground as measure against flooding. The facility discharges treated water to the Marikina River. The treatment plant makes use of the Sequence Batch Reactor biological treatment process.

The Marikina North Sewage Treatment Plant was inaugurated on November 24, 2016.
