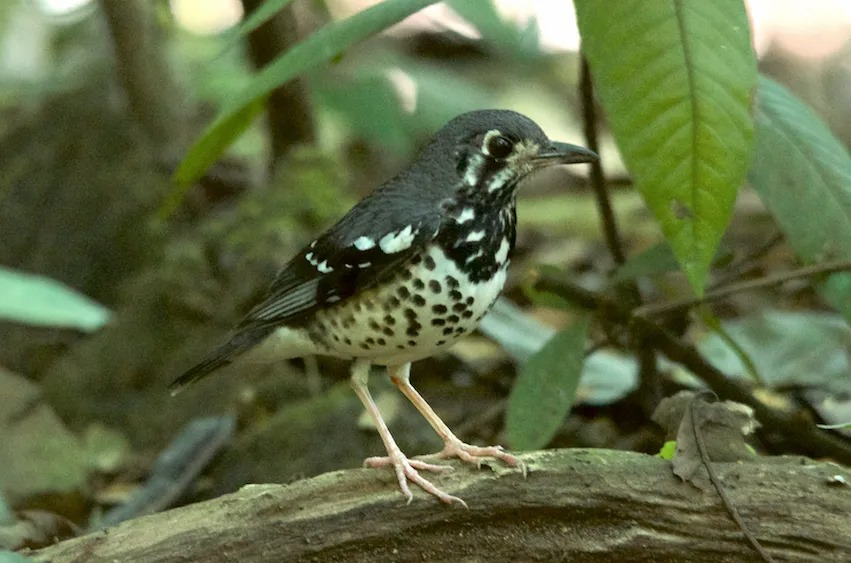
- Ashy thrush at La Mesa Eco Park, Quezon City.

Conservation status
- Vulnerable (IUCN 3.1)

Scientific classification
- Kingdom: Animalia
- Phylum: Chordata
- Class: Aves
- Order: Passeriformes
- Family: Turdidae
- Genus: Geokichla
- Species: G. cinerea

Binomial name
- Geokichla cinerea Bourns & Worcester, 1894

Synonyms
- Zoothera cinerea

= Ashy thrush =

Species of bird

The ashy thrush (Geokichla cinerea), also known as the ashy ground-thrush, is a species of bird in the family Turdidae. It is endemic to the Philippines in Luzon and Mindoro. Its natural habitats are tropical moist lowland forests and or tropical moist montane forests. It is threatened by habitat loss, and the illegal wildlife trade.

== Description and taxonomy ==
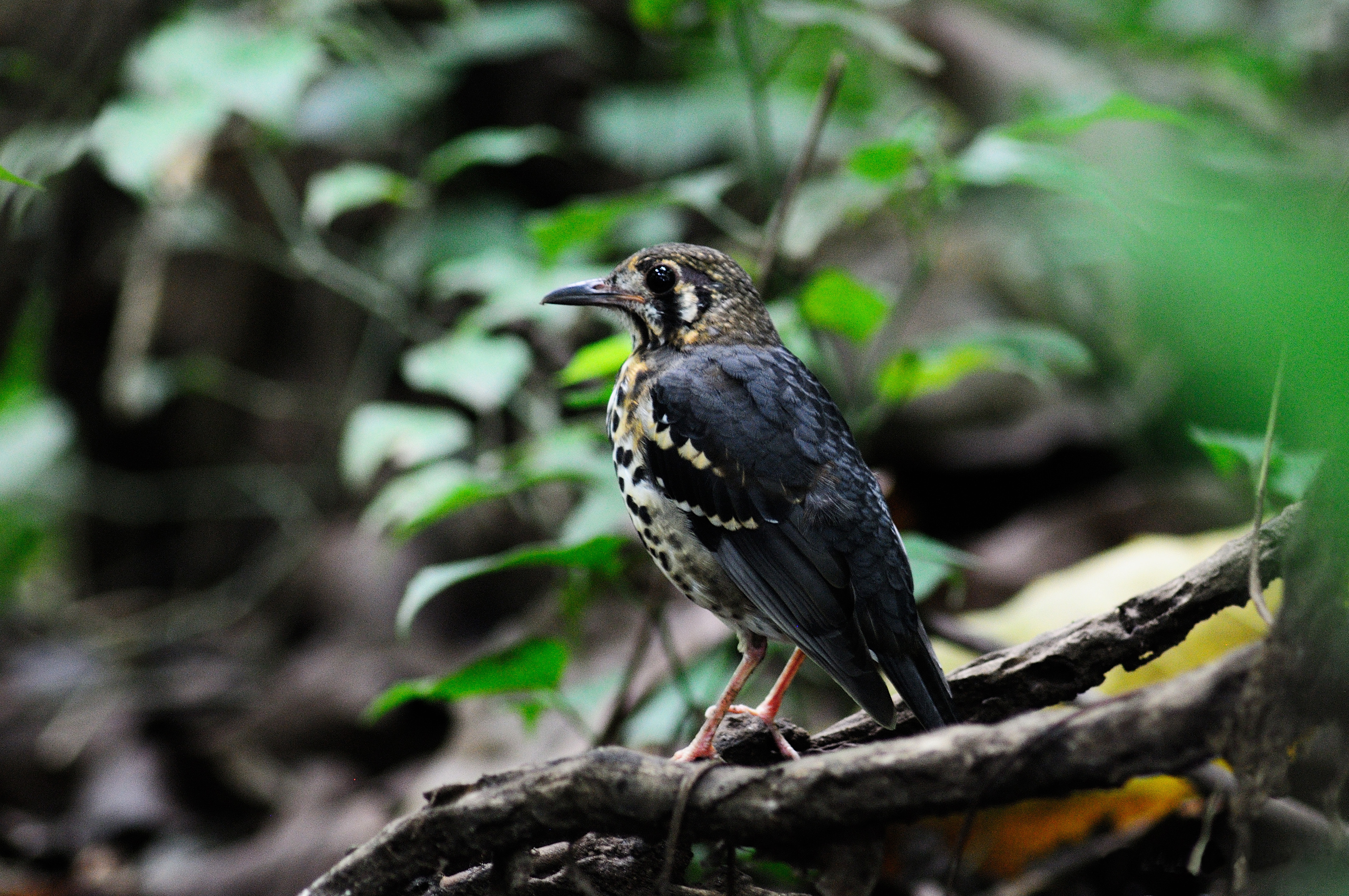
Juvenile in LMEP.

This is a medium sized species of ground dwelling bird found in the lowland and foothill forests of Luzon and Mindanao. It has slaty gray upperparts, a white belly filled with dark spots mostly concentrated on the chest. It has two white wingbars and a black vertical facial stripe. Like most ground dwelling birds, it has larger eyes that allow it to see better on the forest floor. Legs are dull yellow and bill is dark.

Juvenile birds display a brown was on its face and chest.

This species is monotypic.

== Ecology and behaviour ==
In 2012, these birds were discovered to be present in the La Mesa Ecopark which is close to the heart of Metro Manila and is the main site where these birds are observed (80% of all EBird records) and studied, thus most of this information is from this subpopulation. These birds are easily seen in this area and less afraid of visitors but elsewhere this species is extremely elusive

These are ground birds and eat earthworms and other small insects. It has also been recorded feeding on figs.

Breeds in March to June. Average clutch size is two to three eggs. It has been recorded to breed in La Mesa Ecopark.

This species has been recorded in the migrant bottleneck in Dalton Pass which suggests either post breeding dispersal or possibly a yearly intra-island migration between Cordillera Centra and Sierra Madre. More research is needed to understand this species' movement and ecology.

== Habitat and conservation status ==
It is found in tropical moist primary and secondary forest with a large majority up to 1,100 meters above sea level with a few records up to 1,560 meters above sea level.

The International Union for Conservation of Nature has assessed this bird as vulnerable with the population estimated to be 6,000 to 15,000 mature individuals with the population declining. While this species is easily found and observed in La Mesa Ecopark, where these birds may be more habituated to humans, elsewhere, this species is rare and elusive. This species' main threat is habitat loss with wholesale clearance of forest habitats as a result of logging, agricultural conversion, road development and mining activities occurring within the range. It may also suffer from hunting with snares in the Sierra Madre and illicit bird-trapping at Dalton Pass may exert a considerable pressure.

It occurs in the protected areas Angat Watershed Forest Reserve, Quezon Protected Landscape, Mount Makiling National Park and Northern Sierra Madre Natural Park however, like most areas in the Philippines, protection is lax and deforestation and hunting persist even in these areas.
