= Legacy debt =

Concept in American welfare policy

In the United States Social Security System, the term "legacy debt" has been used for the difference between what the current and past cohorts of beneficiaries paid into the system and the benefits they were paid. Ida May Fuller paid total taxes of $24.75 from 1937 until her retirement at 65 in 1939. Upon her death at age 100 in 1975 she had been paid $22,888 in Social Security benefits.
