= Maynilad Water Services =

Manila area water supplier

- Logo
- Type: Stock, for profit publicly held company
- Traded as: PSE: MYNLD
- Industry: Public Utility Infrastructure
- Founded: January 22, 1997; 29 years ago
- Headquarters: Quezon City, Philippines
- Key people: Manuel V. Pangilinan (Chair); Ramoncito S. Fernandez (President and CEO); Jaime T. Lichauco (COO)
- Services: Water Delivery; Sewerage and sanitation
- Parent: Metro Pacific Investments Corporation; DMCI Holdings, Inc.
- Website: mayniladwater.com.ph

Maynilad Water Services, Inc., better known as Maynilad, is the water and wastewater services provider of cities and municipalities that form the West Zone of the Greater Manila Area in the Philippines. It is an agent and contractor of the Metropolitan Waterworks and Sewerage System (MWSS). Maynilad is one of two private water providers in Metro Manila, the other being Manila Water.

Incorporated in 1997, it became a publicly listed company on November 7, 2025 and currently serves over 9 million people in the cities of Caloocan, Las Piñas, Malabon, Muntinlupa, Navotas, Parañaque, Pasay, and Valenzuela; along with most of the City of Manila and portions of Quezon City and Makati west of the Metro Manila Skyway. Outside Metro Manila, in Cavite Province it serves the cities of Cavite, Bacoor and Imus and the municipalities of Kawit, Noveleta and Rosario.

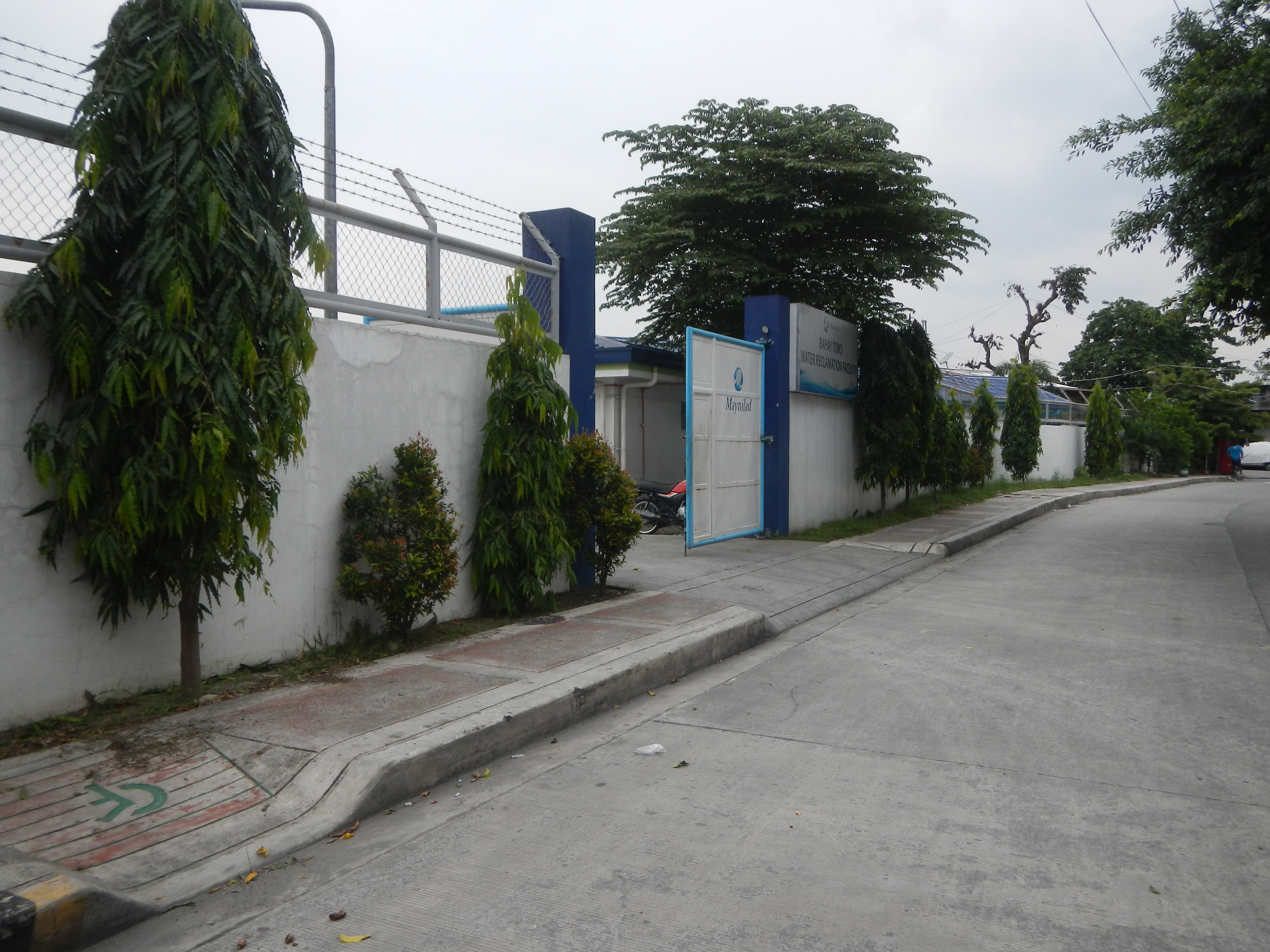
Maynilad's Bahay Toro Water Reclamation Facility in Quezon City.

== History ==
As part of the water privatization in Metro Manila, the Metropolitan Waterworks and Sewerage System awarded contracts to two companies splitting Metro Manila into a west and east zones. Maynilad Water Services Inc. was formed in 1997 as a partnership of the Benpres Holdings Corporation (now the López Group of Companies) and Ondeo Water Services Inc. after it won the bidding to run the water and wastewater services in the West Zone.

Benpres eventually left the partnership in 2006 to settle a US$240 million debt. Then January 24, 2007, a consortium led by Metro Pacific Investments Corporation and the DMCI Holdings, Inc. took over the company and paid the debt by January 2008.

Former logo of Maynilad.

In late 2019, leading figures Manny Pangilinan of Maynilad along with Jaime Augusto Zóbel de Ayala of then Ayala Corporation-led Manila Water (MWC), were then threatened of arrest by President Rodrigo Duterte due to accusations of syndicated estafa, economic sabotage, among others. This was after MWC won a tariff-related international arbitration against the government. The sequence of events resulted to the renegotation of contracts and for Maynilad's part, culminating to enactment of Republic Act No. 11600. As part of the franchise grant conditions, as passed by the Congress of the Philippines and concurred by Duterte, it had to be publicly listed in the local bourse on or before January 2027. It eventually listed on November 7, 2025, more than a year ahead of the deadline.

== Water source ==
Angat Dam is the main source of water for Metro Manila. It supplies about 90 percent of raw water requirements for Metro Manila through the facilities of the Metropolitan Waterworks and Sewerage System. Maynilad is sourcing its more than 90 percent raw water supply requirement from Angat Dam.

Laguna de Bay is another source of water for Maynilad, mainly serving Muntinlupa and Cavite.

=== Laguna Lake Drinking Water Treatment Plant ===
On December 15, 2023, President Bongbong Marcos, assisted by Maynilad president and CEO Ramoncito Fernandez, MWSS administrator, Leonor Cleofas and Manuel Pangilinan inaugurated MWS’ ₱11-billion Poblacion Water Treatment Plant in Muntinlupa. The operation and maintenance of the Laguna Lake Drinking Water Treatment Plant was awarded by MWS to Acciona, CEO José Díaz-Caneja, and D.M Consulting Inc.-DMCI Holdings, Inc. It will process 150 million liters (40×10^{6} U.S. gal) of drinking water a day from Laguna de Bay. On April 15, 2024, it won the "Water Project of the Year" in the London Global Water Awards by Global Water Summit.

== Service area ==
=== West Zone of Metro Manila ===
Zones of Metro Manila allocated to Maynilad Water Services (red) and Manila Water (blue)

- Manila (excluding the districts of Santa Ana, Manila and San Andres, Manila)
- Caloocan
- Las Piñas
- Malabon
- Muntinlupa
- Navotas
- Pasay
- Parañaque (Except for barangay of San Martin de Porres)
- Valenzuela
- Quezon City (North western part)
- Makati (West part)

=== Cavite (West Cavite and East Cavite Business Area) ===
by February 1, 2021, Maynilad divided the Cavite Business Area into 2 sub-office.

East Cavite Business Area

- Bacoor
- Imus City (except for the Barangays of Carsadang Bago, Medicion, Toclong(Imus), Bayan Luma, Tanzang Luma, Pag-asa and Poblacion is part of West Cavite Business Area )

West Cavite Business Area

- Cavite City
- Kawit
- Noveleta
- Rosario
- Imus City (Some parts of the city)

== Impact ==
=== Access to Water ===
By the end of 2018, Maynilad posted a total of 1,407,503 accounts or about 9.5 million people in its customer base. Since 2019, there have been unexplained daily service interruptions that have been penalized by the Metropolitan Waterworks and Sewerage System Regulatory Office (MWSS-RO).

The MWSS last September 2022 slapped Maynilad with a P9.264-million fine for "unusual and prolonged" service interruptions experienced by customers from May to July 2022. The MWSS also penalized Maynilad in February 2022 for unusual and prolonged service interruptions within the Putatan Water Treatment Plant supply zone, equivalent to a rebate of P323 in the April bill.

=== Water Losses ===
When Maynilad was re-privatized in 2007, the company was losing some 1,500 million liters of treated water per day. This translated to a Non-revenue water (NRW) level of 67%—meaning two-thirds of the potable water it was producing was being lost.

Most of the water—some 75% —was lost through the old and inefficient distribution system Maynilad inherited from the government and its previous owners. In fact, the company's pipe network is considered the oldest in Asia, some dating back to the time when the Philippines was still under the Spanish rule.

While a massive pipe replacement program would have dramatically reduced its NRW in a short amount of time, Maynilad decided against it because it would ultimately result in significantly higher tariffs for its customers. Instead, it invested in its human resources, technical equipment, engineering methodologies and internal procedures so it could serve more people through less water losses.

After launching what was dubbed as the "largest NRW management project in the world", Maynilad has successfully brought down its NRW level to an all-time low of 27% by the end of 2018.

In 2017, Maynilad plugged a total of 26,792 pipe leaks within its concessionaire area thus bringing the company's total leak repairs to 316,757 since its re-privatization in 2007.

Maynilad's water loss reduction efforts have been recognized by various organizations including the International Water Association and the United Nations Human Settlements Programme (UN Habitat).

=== Wastewater Management ===
Aside from water services, Maynilad also manages wastewater in the West Zone in the form of sewerage and sanitation services.

Sewerage services involve the treatment of wastewater conveyed via a sewer network to Maynilad's sewage treatment plants. As of 2016, only residents and establishments in Ayala Alabang Village in Muntinlupa, Magallanes Village in Makati, portions of Manila, Malabon, and Navotas, Project 7 and Project 8 in Quezon City, and portions of South Caloocan may connect to Maynilad's sewerage system.

Meanwhile, Maynilad offers sanitation services or septic tank cleaning to households that are not yet connected to its sewer system. Septic tank cleaning or desludging comes at no extra cost for residential and semi-business account holders, and is conducted every five to seven years.

== Ownership ==
- Metro Pacific Investments Corporation: 52.8%
- DMCI Holdings, Inc.: 25.24%
- Marubeni Corporation: 21.54%

== See also ==
- Water supply and sanitation in the Philippines
