= Metropolitan Waterworks and Sewerage System =

Government agency in the Philippines

- Sistema ng Patubig at Alkantarilya sa Kalungsuran

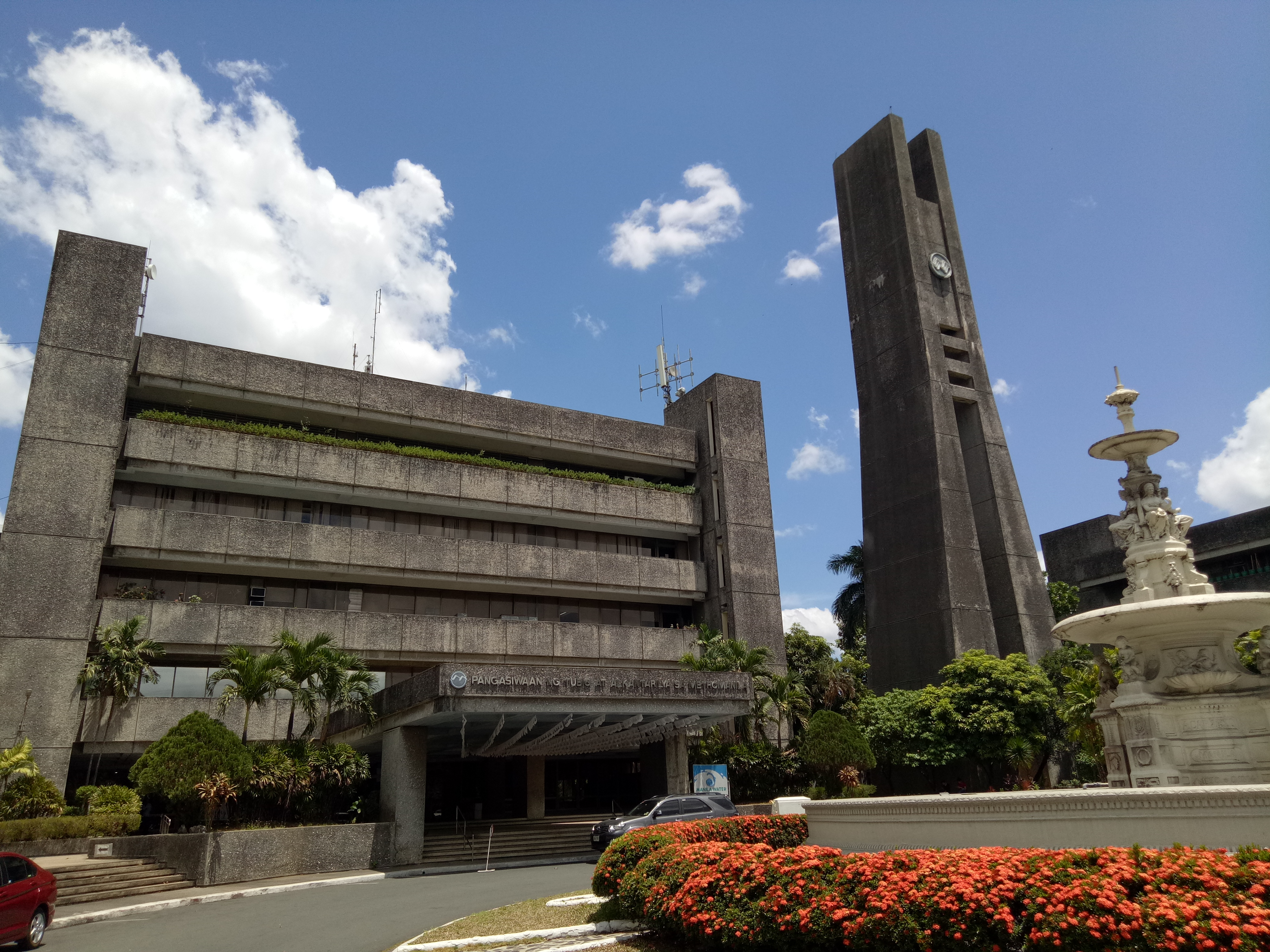
- MWSS Headquarters

Agency overview
- Formed: June 19, 1971; 55 years ago
- Preceding agencies: Carriedo Water System (1882); Manila Water Supply System (1908); Metropolitan Water District (1919); National Waterworks and Sewerage System Authority (1955)
- Type: Regulatory agency
- Headquarters: Katipunan Avenue, Balara, Diliman, Quezon City, Philippines
- Annual budget: ₱5.69 billion (2022)
- Agency executive: Elpidio J. Vega (chairman)
- Parent department: Office of the President of the Philippines
- Website: mwss.gov.ph

The Metropolitan Waterworks and Sewerage System (MWSS; Filipino: Sistema ng Patubig at Alkantarilya sa Kalungsuran), formerly known as the National Waterworks and Sewerage Authority (NAWASA), is a government agency responsible for overseeing water and sewerage services in Metro Manila and the nearby provinces of Cavite and Rizal, in the Philippines.

MWSS divided the water concession into two zones: the East Zone, awarded to Manila Water, and the West Zone, awarded to Maynilad Water Services.

== History ==
Zones of Metro Manila allocated to Maynilad Water (red) and Manila Water (blue)

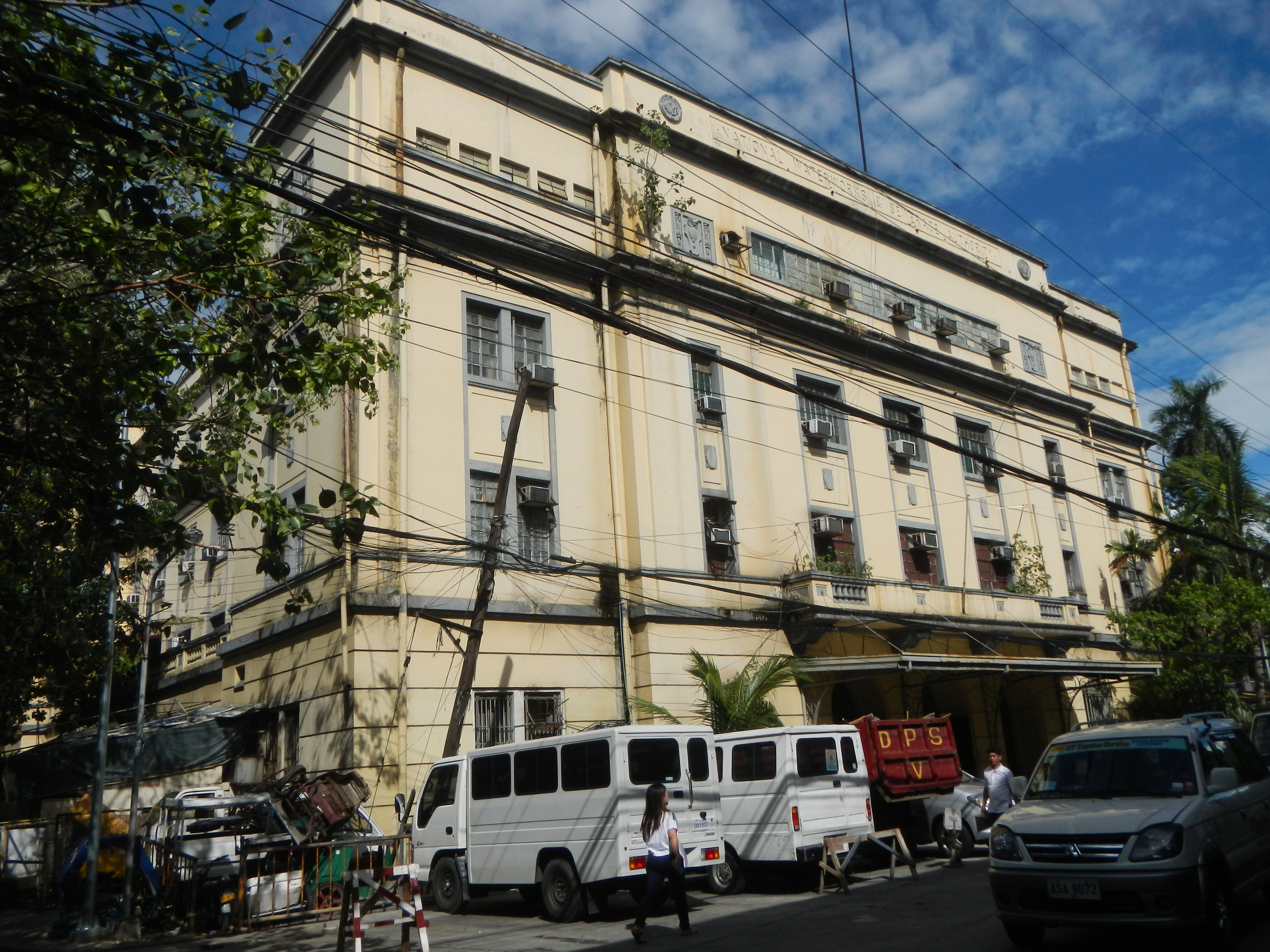
Old NAWASA building in Arroceros, Manila in 2016)

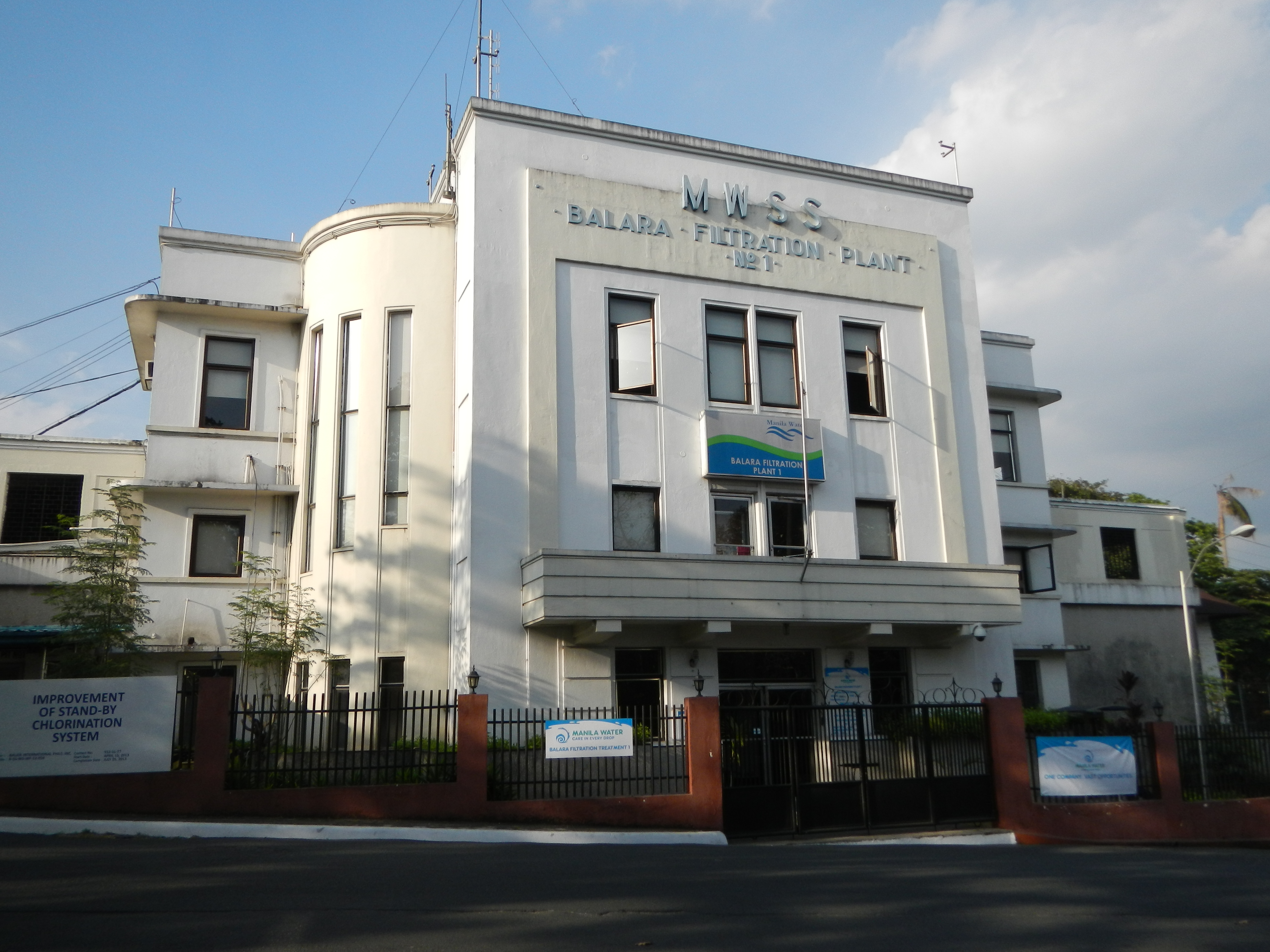
Facade of Filtration Plant No. 1 of Balara Filters Park in February 2014

The first water system in the Philippines was initiated by the Spanish Philanthropist, Francisco Carriedo y Peredo. Carriedo donated funds to be used in Manila; however, it was never realized until a century later, when the Spanish Franciscan friar Felix Huerta tracked down the funds donated by Carriedo, and instigated the development of the Carriedo Water System. The construction of the water system delivered 16 million liters of water per day to 300,000 people. By 1909, the capacity of the system was increased to 92 million liters per day by the addition of pumping facilities and the construction of Wawa Dam.

With its expansion of responsibilities, the institution changed its name several times from the Carriedo Water System, to the Manila Water Supply System in 1908, to the Metropolitan Water District in 1919, to the National Waterworks and Sewerage System Authority (NAWASA; Pangasiwaan ng Pambansang Tubig at Alkantarilya), and finally, to the Metropolitan Waterworks and Sewerage System (MWSS) in 1971.

== Metropolitan Waterworks and Sewerage System Regulatory Office ==
The MWSS Regulatory Office (RO) was created in August 1997 by virtue of the Concession Agreements signed between the MWSS and the two concessionaires, Manila Water Company, Inc. for the East Zone and Maynilad Water Services, Inc. for the West Zone.

RO functions as a collegial body composed of five members headed by the Director or Chief Regulator who has over-all responsibility for the operation of the office. Other members are the Regulators for Technical Regulation, Customer Service Regulation, Financial Regulation and Administration and Legal Affairs.

Any action or decision by the RO on substantive matters affecting the Concession Agreement requires at least a majority vote of three members. The Chief Regulator chairs the meeting of the Regulatory Office and has the final approval over the hiring and dismissal of all professional staff of the RO. He also acts as the principal spokesperson of the office.

RO is mandated to monitor the Concession Agreement. Among its many functions, RO reviews, monitor and enforces rates and service standards; arranges and reports regular independent audits of the performance of the Concessionaires; and monitors the infrastructure assets. However, RO's functions may change over time for effective regulation of water and sewerage services.

=== Organization ===
List of former directors and administrators
Name	Tenure of office	Organization
Paul W. Mack	1930–1934	Metropolitan Water District
Gregorio Anonas	1934–1938	Metropolitan Water District
Ambrosio Magsaysay	1938–1947	Metropolitan Water District
Manuel Mañosa	1947–1955	Metropolitan Water District
Susano R. Nagado	1955–1963	National Waterworks and Sewerage System Authority
Jesus C. Perlas	1963–1966	National Waterworks and Sewerage System Authority
Antonio C. Menor	1966–1969	National Waterworks and Sewerage System Authority
Sergio M. Isada	1969–1971	National Waterworks and Sewerage System Authority
Sergio M. Isada	1971–1976	Metropolitan Waterworks and Sewerage System
Oscar J. Ilustre	1976–1983	Metropolitan Waterworks and Sewerage System
Abor P. Canlas	1983–1986	Metropolitan Waterworks and Sewerage System
Jose Yap	1986–1987	Metropolitan Waterworks and Sewerage System
Luis V. Sison	1987–1992	Metropolitan Waterworks and Sewerage System
Teofilo J. Asuncion	1992–1994	Metropolitan Waterworks and Sewerage System
Ruben A. Hernandez	1994–1995	Metropolitan Waterworks and Sewerage System
Dr. Angel L. Lazaro III	1995–1997	Metropolitan Waterworks and Sewerage System
Dr. Reynaldo B. Vea	1997–2000	Metropolitan Waterworks and Sewerage System
Jose F. Mabanta	2000–2001	Metropolitan Waterworks and Sewerage System
Orlando C. Hondrade	2001–2006	Metropolitan Waterworks and Sewerage System
Lorenzo H. Jamora	2007–2008	Metropolitan Waterworks and Sewerage System
Diosdado Jose M. Allado	2008–2010	Metropolitan Waterworks and Sewerage System
Gerardo A. I. Esquivel	2010–2011	Metropolitan Waterworks and Sewerage System
Rogelio L. Singson	2011–2017	Metropolitan Waterworks and Sewerage System
Reynaldo V. Velasco	2017–2019	Metropolitan Waterworks and Sewerage System
Emmanuel Salamat	2019–2021	Metropolitan Waterworks and Sewerage System
Leonor C. Cleofas (Note: First female administrator)	2021–present	Metropolitan Waterworks and Sewerage System

== Private concessionaires ==
- Maynilad
- Manila Water
