= Manila Water =

Philippines utility company

Manila Water Company, Inc.
- Logo
- Type: Stock, for profit publicly-held company
- Traded as: PSE: MWC
- Industry: Public Utility Infrastructure
- Founded: January 6, 1997; 29 years ago
- Headquarters: Quezon City, Philippines
- Key people: Roberto Jose R. Locsin (President and CEO)
- Services: Water delivery Sewerage and sanitation
- Net income: ₱3.75 billion ▼ (2021)
- Parent: Trident Water Holdings Company, Inc.
- Website: manilawater.com

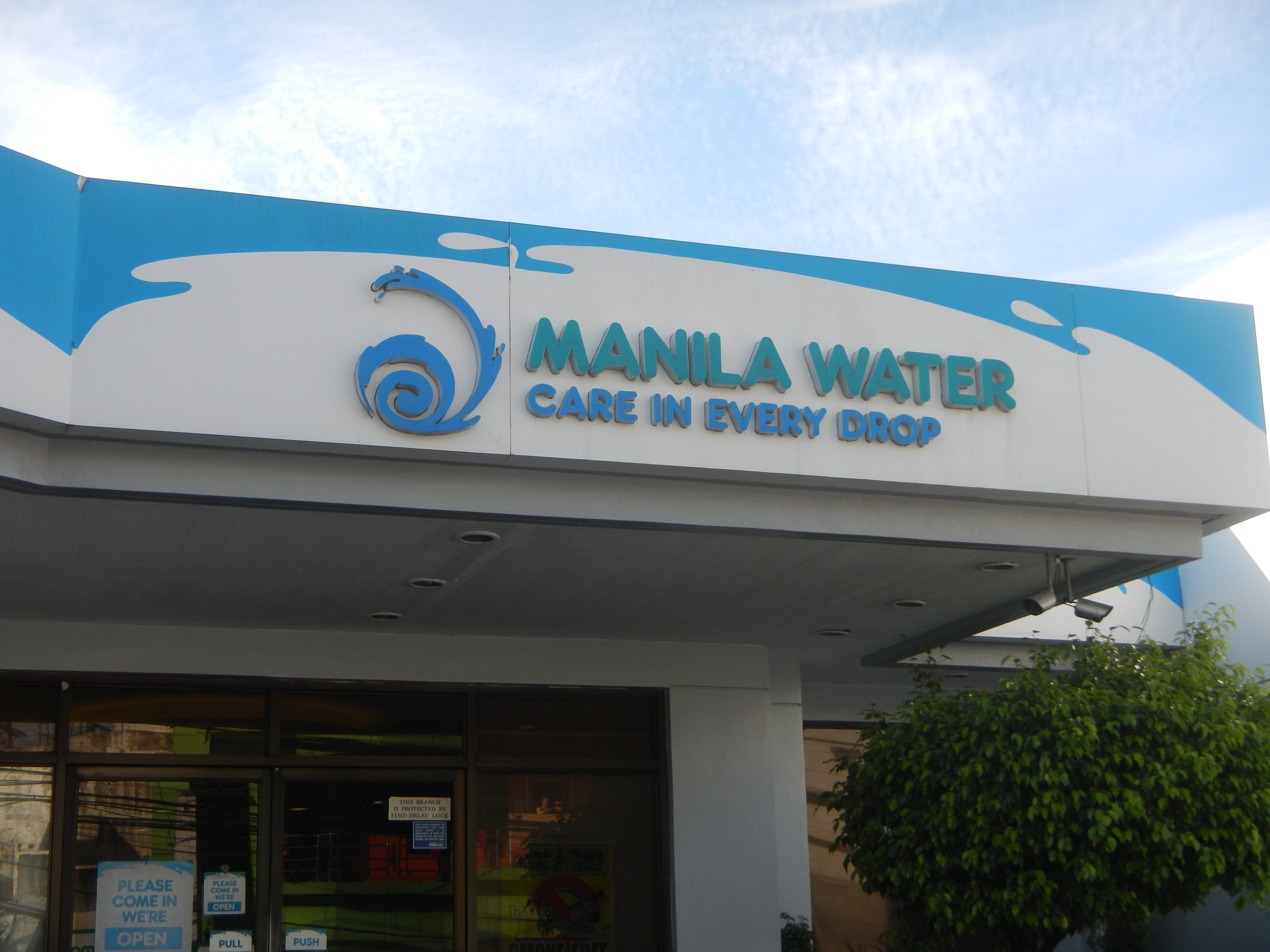
Manila Water service area in Rosario, Pasig

Manila Water Company, Inc. has the exclusive right to provide water and used water (wastewater) services to over six million people in the East Zone of Metro Manila. It is a subsidiary of Enrique Razon's Trident Water Holdings Company, Inc., who acquired stakes from the country's oldest conglomerate, Ayala Corporation, starting in 2020 and completely taking over by 2024.

Incorporated on January 6, 1997, Manila Water became a publicly listed company on March 18, 2005. It is the east concessionaire of Metropolitan Waterworks and Sewerage System during its privatization on August 1, 1997, with its counterpart Maynilad Water Services, Inc. as the west concessionaire. The 25-year water concession agreement inked with MWSS was expected to terminate in 2022. In 2009, its concession agreement with the MWSS was extended by another 15 years up to 2037.

== History ==
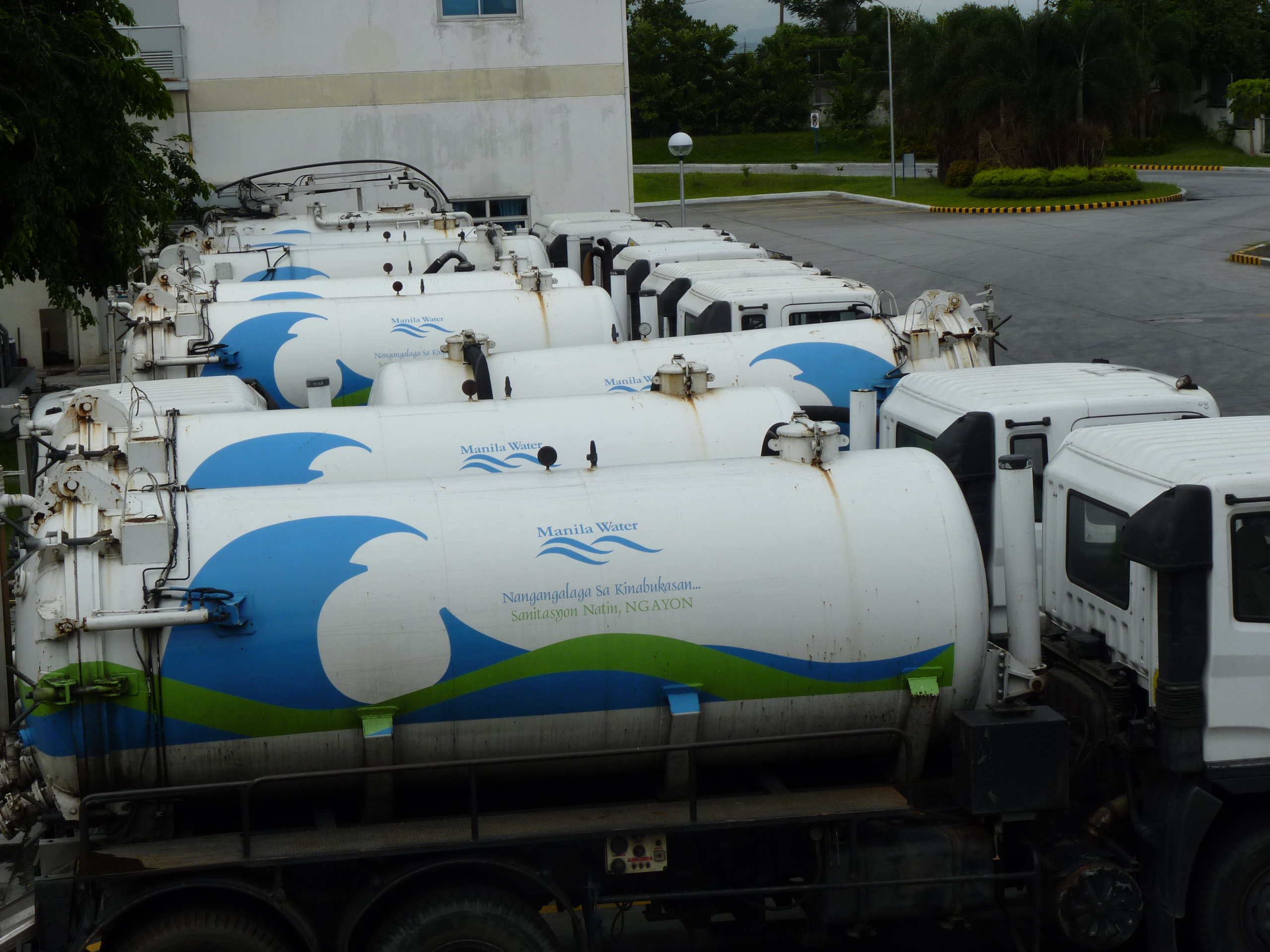
Desludging trucks of Manila Water in 2012

Manila Water Company, a publicly listed company and a subsidiary of Ayala Corporation, holds the exclusive right to provide water and used water services to over six million people in the Manila Water Concession, particularly the East Zone of Metro Manila and Rizal Province consisting of 23 cities and municipalities.

The National Water Crisis Act enacted by the Philippine government paved the way for government-run Metropolitan Waterworks and Sewerage System (MWSS) to turn over the operation of water utilities in the East Zone concession to Ayala-led Manila Water, and the West Zone of Metro Manila to Maynilad Water Services, Inc. in August 1997. This was brought about by the various water supply problems when only 26 percent of the area's population had access to round-the-clock water supply due to high system losses caused by illegal connections, meter tampering, and leaking pipelines. This Concession Agreement was originally for a period of 25 years, due to expire in 2022. In 2009, it was extended by another 15 years by MWSS and the Philippine government, extending the concession until 2024.

As the agent and concessionaire of MWSS, the Concession Agreement gives Manila Water the right to the use the land and operational fixed assets, and the exclusive right to extract and treat raw water, distribute and sell water, and collect, transport, treat and dispose used water discharged by the sewerage system in the East Zone.

On December 3, 2019, leading figures Jaime Augusto Zobel de Ayala along with Manny Pangilinan of Maynilad, were threatened of arrest by then President Rodrigo Duterte due to accusations of syndicated estafa, economic sabotage, among others.He also threatened to nationalize/expropriate the two companies. This was after MWC won a tariff-related international arbitration against the government. The company's share price reached a nadir by mid-December, ending up lower than its IPO price 14 years prior. The sequence of events resulted to the eventual re-negotiation of MWC's concession contract, and within two months Ayala selling the controlling stake to Trident Water Holdings Company, Inc., a subsidiary of Prime Infrastructure Holdings Inc. of the Razon Group. Four years later in 2024, Ayala Corporation completely divested its voting stakes to said group. It however retains economic interests until 2029 through preferred shares. Some quarters say that Ayala's divestment was a fallout of Duterte's actions in 2019.

== Service area ==
Since 1997, the company has been significantly improving its water and used water services by expanding its distribution lines and eliminating system losses in its coverage areas, resulting in increased water availability from 26% in 1997 to 99% of the central distribution system to date.

Manila Water provides water treatment, water distribution, sewerage and sanitation services to over six million people in the East Zone to a broad range of residential, semi-business, commercial, and industrial customers in 23 cities and municipalities:

=== East Zone of Metro Manila ===
Zones of Metro Manila allocated to Manila Water (blue) and Maynilad Water Services (red).

- Makati (Eastern part)
- Mandaluyong
- Manila (Santa Ana and San Andres area)
- Marikina
- Parañaque (San Martin de Porres area)
- Pasig
- Pateros
- Quezon City (Eastern part)
- San Juan
- Taguig

=== Rizal ===
- Angono
- Antipolo
- Baras
- Binangonan
- Cainta
- Cardona
- Jalajala
- Morong
- Pililla
- Rodriguez (Montalban)
- San Mateo
- Tanay
- Taytay
- Teresa

=== Manila Concession Water Sources ===
Manila Water gets its water from Angat Dam at the Angat River in Norzagaray, Bulacan, which is 38 kilometers (24 mi) north of Metro Manila. It is a rockfill dam with a spillway equipped with three gates at a spilling level of 217 meters (712 ft). Angat Dam supplies 96% of Metro Manila's water needs with a storage capacity of about 850 million cubic meters (30×10^{9} cu ft). Five auxiliary turbines release water from Angat Dam, where it is diverted to the two tunnels going to Ipo Dam.

Ipo Dam is a gravity-concrete dam located about 75 meters (246 ft) downstream of the Angat Dam in Bulacan. Primarily a diversion dam, its elevation is maintained at 101 meters (331 ft) as it delivers water into tunnels that lead to La Mesa reservoir and Balara Filtration plants through three tunnels leading to three settling basins in Bigti, Norzagaray, Bulacan. Five aqueducts connected to these settling basins will then deliver a maximum of 4 billion liters (1.1×10^{9} U.S. gal) of water daily at the Novaliches Portal, which will then be conveyed through three open channels going to the Balara Treatment Plant.

La Mesa Dam is an earth dam located in Novaliches, Quezon City and it serves as a primary sedimentation basin prior to water treatment in the Balara and East La Mesa Treatment Plants. Its maximum level is at 80.15 meters (263.0 ft). During dry months, La Mesa Dam may be used as a buffer or reliability dam to provide supply. It can store water that is good for 19 days of Manila Water's supply requirements. Its critical dam level is at 69 meters above sea level. Manila Water has also begun drawing water from the Laguna de Bay, which is treated in and distributed from the Cardona Water Treatment Plant located in Brgy. Del Remedio, Cardona, Rizal. Commencing operations on March 14, 2019, the water treatment plant is now providing up to 100 million liters (26,000,000 U.S. gal) of potable water per day to several towns in Rizal, augmenting water supply to Manila Water's concession area while alternative major water sources are being developed.

=== Water Treatment Facilities ===
Manila Water operates four water treatment plants: Balara Filter 1, Balara Filter 2, and East La Mesa, all located in Quezon City, as well as the Cardona Water Treatment Plant in Rizal.

The Balara Treatment Plants filter the equivalent of 6.5 billion glasses of water every day. The Balara Filter 1, operational since 1935, has a treatment capacity of 470 million liters (120,000,000 U.S. gal) per day. On the other hand, Balara Filter 2 has been operational since 1958 and treats 1,130 million liters (300,000,000 U.S. gal) of water daily. Both treatment plants deliver water to Metro Manila's eastern area.

The East La Mesa Treatment Plant, located in Payatas, Quezon City, has a capacity of treating 150 million liters (40,000,000 U.S. gal) of water per day. Since 2012, it supplies water to far-flung expansion areas in the Rizal Province, improving the supply balance of the entire network.

The Cardona plant, with a capacity of treating 100 million liters (26,000,000 U.S. gal) of water per day, employs a more rigorous and complex treatment process and types of equipment compared to other existing water treatment plants because of the diverse quality of water from Laguna de Bay. The process includes treatment for suspended solids, organic matter, algae, and dissolved solids. The treatment plant is complemented by 45 kilometers (28 mi) of transmission lines plus 61 kilometers (38 mi) of distribution lines.

=== Water Distribution ===
Manila Water's distribution system consists of transmission and distribution lines, pumping stations, and reservoirs to ensure that potable water is delivered to all customers. Pipelines laid and maintained across the East Zone since 1997 have spanned over 5,000 kilometers (3,100 mi), serving 99 percent of the company's concession area with a water supply pressure of 7 bar and above.

=== Water Sampling and Laboratory Analysis ===
On a regular basis, Manila Water's Laboratory Services processes an average of around 900 water samples from the distribution network monthly. This is to ensure that water to be delivered to the customers passes not only the regulatory standards on quality, but also to 100% comply with the Philippine National Standards for Drinking Water (PNSDW).

=== Used Water Services ===
Manila Water also provides sewerage and sanitation services.

Sewerage services of Manila Water include the operation and maintenance of sewer pipeline networks that collect and convey sewage to a Sewage Treatment Plant (STP) which cleans the used water before safely returning the treated water to rivers.

To address the sewage and sanitation needs of its service areas, Manila Water constructed compact or “package” sewage treatment plants to serve specific areas or communities. Manila Water also utilizes a Combined Sewer-Drainage System in the collection of used water from households, utilizing the existing municipal drainage system for used water conveyance. This minimizes the laying of separate sewer lines.

Manila Water has laid over 300 kilometers (190 mi) of sewer pipelines that goes to 38 sewage treatment plants with a combined treatment capacity of 310 million liters (82,000,000 U.S. gal) daily.

=== Sanitation ===
Around 85 percent of Metro Manila's East Zone are not yet covered by a sewer system. These households still utilize their own septic tanks that contains used water called septage. Since septic tanks only get partial treatment, these will eventually leak into the environment if not maintained properly. To address the possible leakage of septic tanks into the rivers and other water systems, Manila Water offers a sanitation service that collects the sludge from septic tanks. Siphoned sludge is then brought to Septage Treatment Plants where it is treated and returned to the environment safely. Manila Water manages two septage treatment plants that treats collected sludge to safely return the used water back to the environment. This sanitation program is carried out through barangay officials.

== Subsidiaries ==
A subsidiary of Manila Water Company, Inc., Manila Water Philippine Ventures (MWPV) covers the country's key metropolitan areas including Cebu, Laguna, Tanauan City in Batangas, Clark in Pampanga, Zamboanga City, Tagum City in Davao and key locations in Bulacan, Pangasinan, Isabela, Nueva Ecija, Iloilo and Samar.

Manila Water Asia Pacific Pte. Ltd. (MWAP) currently provides half of the bulk water requirements of Ho Chi Minh City in Vietnam and leakage reduction programs in Bandung, Indonesia and Yangon, Myanmar. Recently, the company has acquired a stake in East Water, a publicly listed water supply and distribution company in Thailand and in PT Sarana Tirta Ungaran in Indonesia.

Under MWAP are two affiliated companies in Vietnam, namely Thu Duc Water B.O.O Corporation and Kenh Dong Water Supply Joint Stock Company, both supplying treated water to Saigon Water Corporation (SAWACO) under a take-or-pay arrangement. Also under MWAP are Saigon Water Infrastructure Corporation (Saigon Water), a holding company listed in the Ho Chi Minh City Stock Exchange, Cu Chi Water Supply Sewerage Company, Ltd. (Cu Chi Water) and another company tasked to pursue non-revenue water reduction projects in Vietnam called Asia Water Network Solutions (Asia Water).

Lastly, Manila Water Total Solutions Corporation (MWTS), a wholly owned subsidiary, handles after-the-meter products and services. Its current offerings include environmental services like waste-to-energy.

== Ownership ==
As of December 31, 2023:

- Enrique K. Razon's Trident Water Holdings Company, Inc. - 36.92%
- Ayala Corporation - 19.58%
- Public/Officers/Employees - 23.03%
- Foreign - 14.81%
- Philwater Holdings Corporation (an entity linked to Ayala Corp) - 2.96%

== See also ==
- Water privatization in the Philippines
- Water supply and sanitation in the Philippines
