= Umiray–Angat Transbasin Project =

- Coordinates: 14°55′40″N 121°21′52″E
- Begins: Umiray River, General Nakar, Quezon
- Ends: Mancua, Doña Remedios Trinidad, Bulacan
- Maintained by: Metropolitan Waterworks and Sewerage System

Characteristics
- Total length: 13 km (8.1 mi)
- Diameter: 4.30 meters (14.1 ft)

History
- Construction start: 1995; 31 years ago
- Opened: June 2000; 26 years ago

Location
- Interactive map of Umiray–Angat Transbasin Project

The Umiray–Angat Transbasin Project (UATP) is an expansion project of the Metropolitan Waterworks and Sewerage System (MWSS) for the supply of the Angat Dam reservoir. The 13-kilometer-long (8.1 mi) 4.30-meter (14.1 ft) diameter tunnel-aqueduct system diverts waters from the Umiray River east of the Angat Basin. 20–30% of the water that is consumed in Metro Manila and its outlying regions is supplied by the Umiray Basin.

== History ==
The Philippine government and MWSS began studying new water sources for Metro Manila in the 1990s, as the capital had mainly relied on the Angat-Ipo-La Mesa water system as its source since the 1960s, and the demand for potable water was projected to grow from 4,000 million liters a day (mld) to 5,680 mld by 2020. The study identified the Umiray River, Kaliwa River, Kanan River, Marikina River, and Laguna de Bay as possible sources for the growing demand.

While Kaliwa and Kanan River in Quezon Province would be a long-term outlook, the potential of the low impact diversion of Umiray River was considered in 1993. Angat Basin falls under a Climate Type 1, which experiences two seasons, dry season being from the months of March–May, while Umiray River Basin closer to the Pacific Ocean experiences Climate Type 2, which has an all-year round wet weather with pronounced rainfall from November to January. Despite having a smaller basin, Umiray River has a greater discharge volume compared to the Angat Basin due to its climate type.

The Philippine government awarded the US$140 million contract to a Filipino-Italian consortium formed by SELI S.p.A, Grandi Lavori Fincosit S.p.A. of Italy, and J.V. Angeles Construction Corp. Asian Development Bank (ADB) provided a $92 million grant, while the rest was financed by MWSS. Tunneling work commenced in 1996 with a 4.88m diameter Robbins shielded tunnel boring machine. When the contract was awarded to the Filipino-Italian consortium as they had the available tunnel boring machines (TBM) which usually would take a year to manufacture and deliver onsite. The consortium also offered a second TBM which would cut the timeline by another year. The project was set with delays, but finally completed and operational by June 2000 and at a lower cost projected.

On September 28, 1993, President Fidel V. Ramos released Proclamation 264, establishing the Umiray River Watershed Reservation, which encompasses 16,722.75 hectares for the sole purpose of maintaining and conserving the water basin for the UATP.

On November 29, 2004, the tunnel and its facilities were severely damaged because of the effects of Typhoon Unding. This resulted to a complete stoppage of operation of UATP as boulders, logs, and mud clogged the tunnel. It took 3.5 months to declog the tunnel while Metro Manila experienced a 30% drop in supply of water. MWSS sought a permanent solution, and this resulted to the Umiray-Angat Transbasin Rehabilitation Project (UATRP).

Studies for the UATRP began in 2013 and on December 28, 2015 the MWSS released the Notice of Award to A.M. Oreta Construction. However, work has been stalled by the Local Government Unit after the flooding accident at the Sumag River Diversion Project.

In 2014, the Sumag River Diversion Project (SRDP), an original branch of the UATP finally commenced, and the objective was to connect the Sumag River with a 600m long 2.5m diameter tunnel to the existing UATP. The SRDP is expected to bring an additional 188mld into the Angat Reservoir. The project has been beset with delays and a suspension because of a flash-flooding incident resulting to the deaths of six workers and surveyors in 2016. In November 2019, President Rodrigo Duterte ordered the continuation of the tunnel, with Congressman Danilo Suarez providing a support last July 2020. As of March 2021, the project is 71.29% complete.

== Description ==
The UATP tunnel-aqueduct has a length of 13.1 km with an internal diameter of 4.3m. The original plans called for two branch tunnels, with 3 Tyrolean diversion weirs. Currently, only the main tunnel is under operation, providing an average of 13 m^{3}/s flow, with a maximum capacity of 30 m^{3}/s. The inlet of UATP is a Tyrolean weir where it takes advantage of the Umiray River's high capacity of 80 m^{3}/s. This translates to 780 million liters a day (mld). The conveyance of the water from inlet to the Mancua River is done through gravity.

The intake portion of the project also included a mini-hydropower plant generating about 970 kilowatts. UATP also includes an 18 km electrical transmission line from Angat to Umiray River Weir Inlet.

Given that the intake at Umiray River is isolated, the site is only accessible by helicopter. However, there is also a barge on Angat Reservoir that ends at Mancua, Dona Remedios Trinidad where MWSS built a 3 km road to the outlet of the UATP at the Mancua River. To transport operations & maintenance workers, and material, a suspended railcar system was also constructed in the main tunnel and is used during low-flow.

== See also ==
- Aqueduct (water supply)
- Hydroelectricity
