= Sumag River Diversion Project =

- Coordinates: 14°56′11″N 121°20′50″E
- Locale: General Nakar, Quezon
- Begins: Sumag River
- Ends: Umiray-Angat Transbasin Tunnel
- Maintained by: Metropolitan Waterworks and Sewerage System

Characteristics
- Total length: 600 m (2,000 ft)
- Diameter: 2.50 m (8 ft 2 in)

History
- Construction start: 2014

Location
- Interactive map of Sumag River Diversion Project

The Sumag River Diversion Project (SRDP) is an expansion project of the Umiray-Angat Transbasin Project (UATP) Metropolitan Waterworks and Sewerage System (MWSS) for the supply of the Angat Dam reservoir. The 600 meter long and 2.50 meter diameter tunnel-aqueduct system diverts waters from the Sumag River, a tributary of the Umiray River, east of the Angat Basin. The SRDP is forecasted to add 188 mld to the existing 777.6 mld capacity of the UATP.

== History ==
The UATP was completed in June 2000, but on November 29, 2004, the tunnel and its facilities were severely damaged because of the effects of Typhoon Unding. This resulted to a complete stoppage of operation of UATP as boulders, logs, and mud clogged the tunnel. It took 3.5 months to declog the tunnel while Metro Manila experienced a 30% drop in supply of water. MWSS sought a permanent solution, and this resulted to the Umiray-Angat Transbasin Rehabilitation Project (UATRP).

Studies for the UATRP began in 2013 and on December 28, 2015 the MWSS released the Notice of Award to A.M. Oreta Construction. However, work has been stalled by the Local Government Unit after the flooding accident at the SRDP.

In 2014, the SRDP finally commenced and the objective was to connect the Sumag River with the existing UATP. The P717 million contract was awarded by MWSS and Maynilad to Cavite Ideal International Construction and Development. The project has been beset with delays and a suspension because of a flash-flooding incident resulting to the deaths of six workers and surveyors in 2016. In November 2019, President Rodrigo Duterte ordered the continuation of the tunnel, with Cong. Danilo Suarez providing a support last July 2020. As of March 2021, the project is 71.29% complete.

== See also ==
- Aqueduct (water supply)
- Hydroelectricity
