= Angat Watershed Forest Reserve =

Nature reserve in the Philippines

- IUCN category VI (protected area with sustainable use of natural resources)
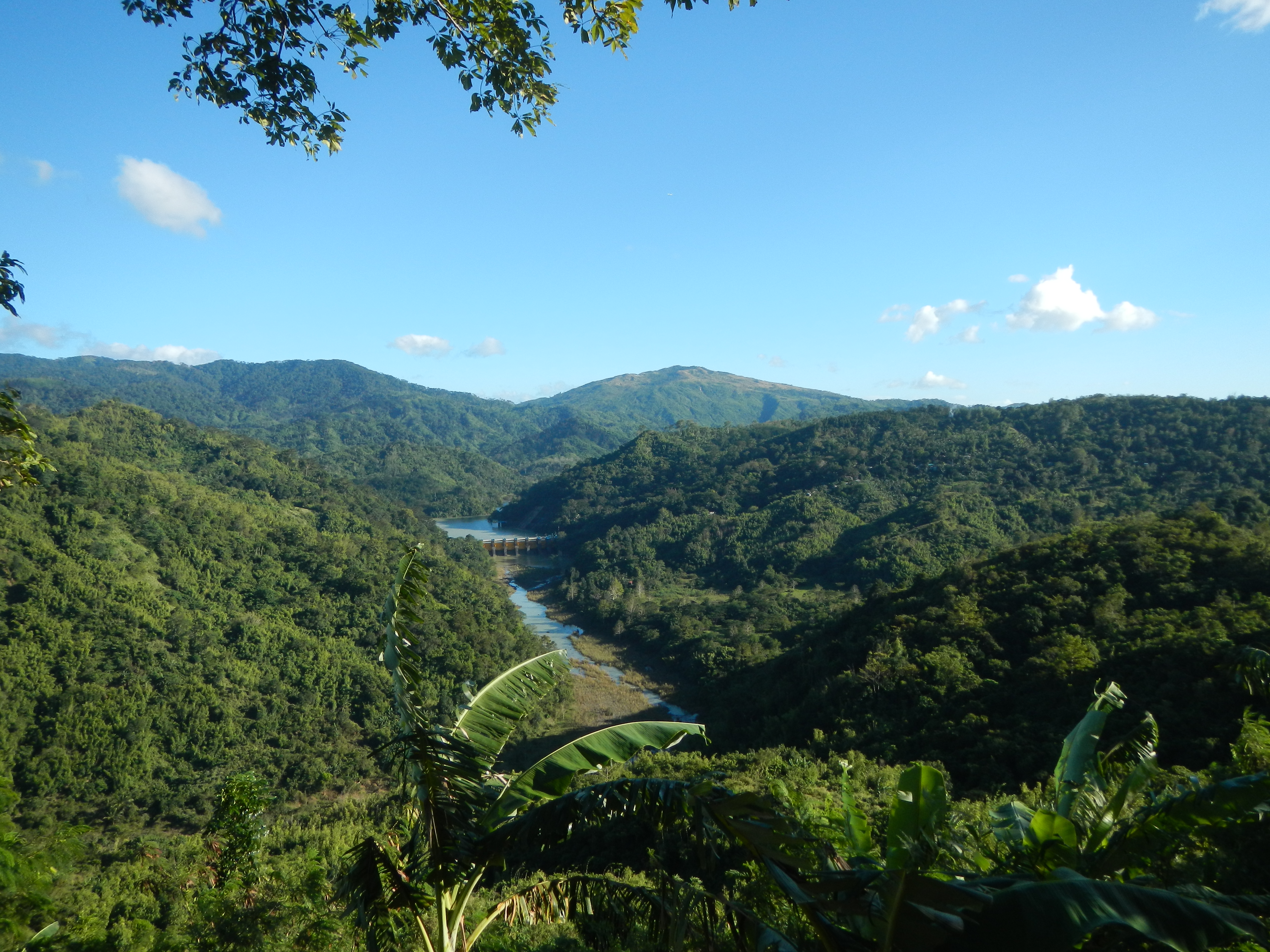
- View of the Angat reserve surrounding the Ipo Dam from the Hilltop view deck in Norzagaray

- Location within Philippines
- Location: Bulacan, Rizal, Nueva Ecija, Quezon, Philippines
- Nearest city: San Jose del Monte
- Coordinates: 14°58′18″N 121°11′18″E
- Area: 62,309 hectares (153,970 acres)
- Established: July 26, 1904 (reservation); March 10, 1927 (forest reserve); April 30, 1968 (pilot reserve/forest range)
- Governing body: Department of Environment and Natural Resources; Metropolitan Waterworks and Sewerage System; Angat Hydropower Corporation

The Angat Watershed Forest Reserve is a conservation area that protects the drainage basin in the southern Sierra Madre range north of Metro Manila in the Philippines where surface water empties into the Angat River and its distributaries. It is spread over an area of 62,309 hectares (153,970 acres) in the eastern portion of Bulacan and northern Rizal province at an altitude of between 490 and 1,206 metres (1,608 and 3,957 ft). The conservation area also extends to the provinces of Nueva Ecija and Quezon and is centered on an artificial lake created by the Angat Dam which, together with the Ipo Dam located 7.5 kilometres (4.7 mi) downstream, supply 97% of the water requirement of Metro Manila via an aqueduct system to the La Mesa Dam and Reservoir and the Balara Filtration Plant in Quezon City. The Angat Dam and Reservoir is also a major source of hydroelectricity for Metro Manila and surrounding provinces, contributing some 200 megawatts to the Luzon grid. The watershed is a popular birdwatching site and is a biodiversity hotspot containing most of the remaining closed-canopy forests in Central Luzon.

== History ==
The Angat Watershed was first gazetted on July 26, 1904, as the Angat River Reserve through Executive Order No. 33 signed by Civil Governor Luke Edward Wright. It set aside the Angat River in the municipality of Norzagaray bordering Mounts Salacot, Balugan and Sulip in the Sierra Madre range and including the Bulagao and Bitbit creeks for purposes of the development of water power from the river. On March 10, 1927, through Proclamation No. 71 signed by Governor-General Leonard Wood, the 62,309-hectare (153,970-acre) Angat Watershed Forest Reserve was established covering portions of the municipalities of Montalban, San José del Monte, Norzagaray, Angat, San Rafael, San Miguel, Peñaranda and Infanta in the provinces of Rizal, Bulacan, Nueva Ecija and Tayabas, with the administration and control placed under the Department of Agriculture and Natural Resources. At about this time, the Metropolitan Water District (now Metropolitan Waterworks and Sewerage System) started construction on the ₱11,500,000 Angat–Novaliches Water System including the Ipo Dam located within the reserve, which was completed in 1939 and inaugurated in 1940. On December 4, 1965, with the construction of the Angat Hydroelectric Dam within the protected area, President Diosdado Macapagal signed Proclamation No. 505 transferring the administration of the whole reserve to the National Power Corporation.

On April 30, 1968, 6,600 hectares (16,000 acres) of land surrounding the Ipo Dam was declared as a separate forest range and watershed management pilot project reserve through Proclamation No. 391 issued by President Ferdinand Marcos. This declaration effectively excluded the southern section of the watershed from the control of the National Power Corporation and placed it instead under the joint administration and control of the Director of Forestry of the Department of Agriculture and Natural Resources and the General Manager of the Metropolitan Waterworks and Sewerage System.

== Geography ==
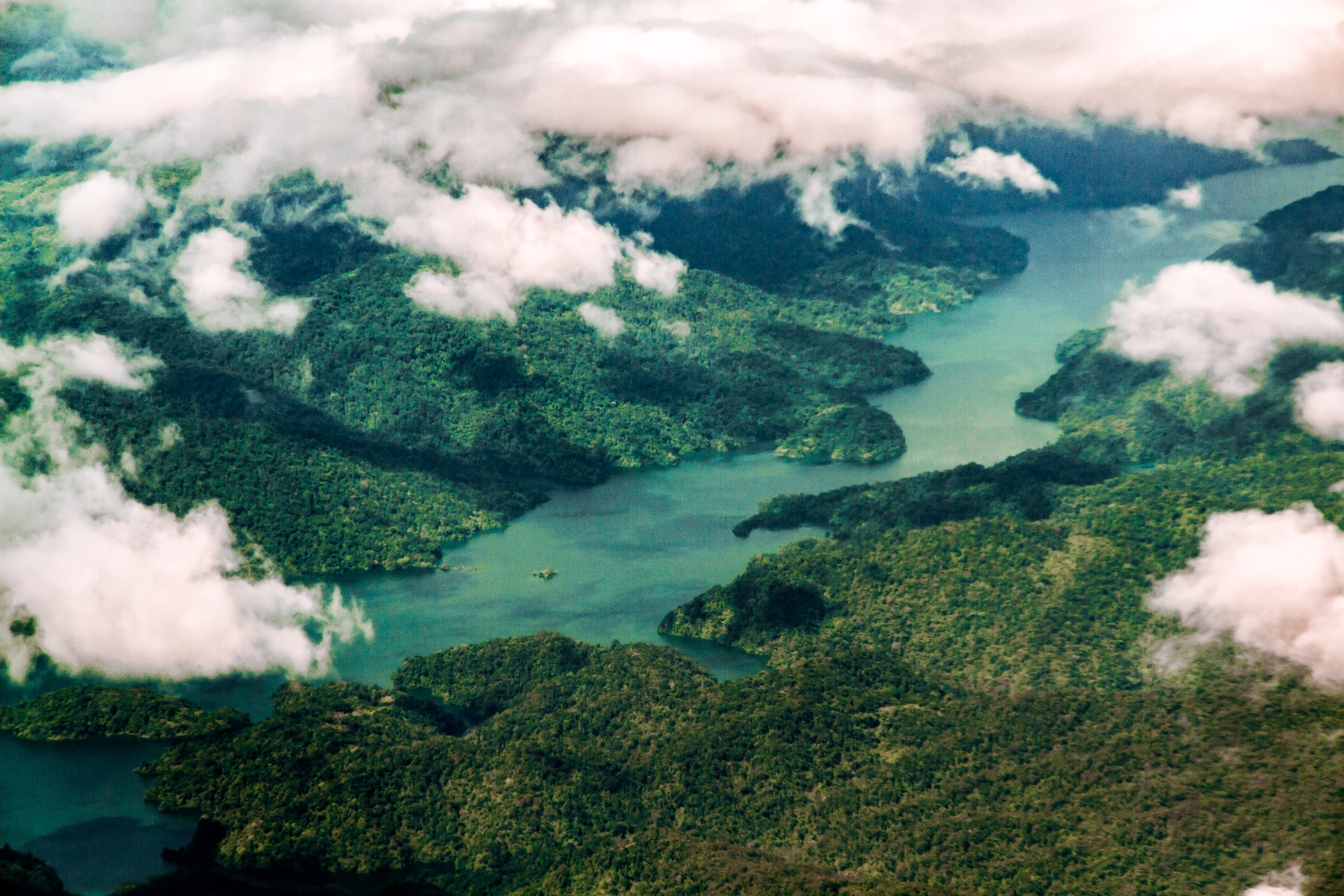
Aerial view of the forest reserve

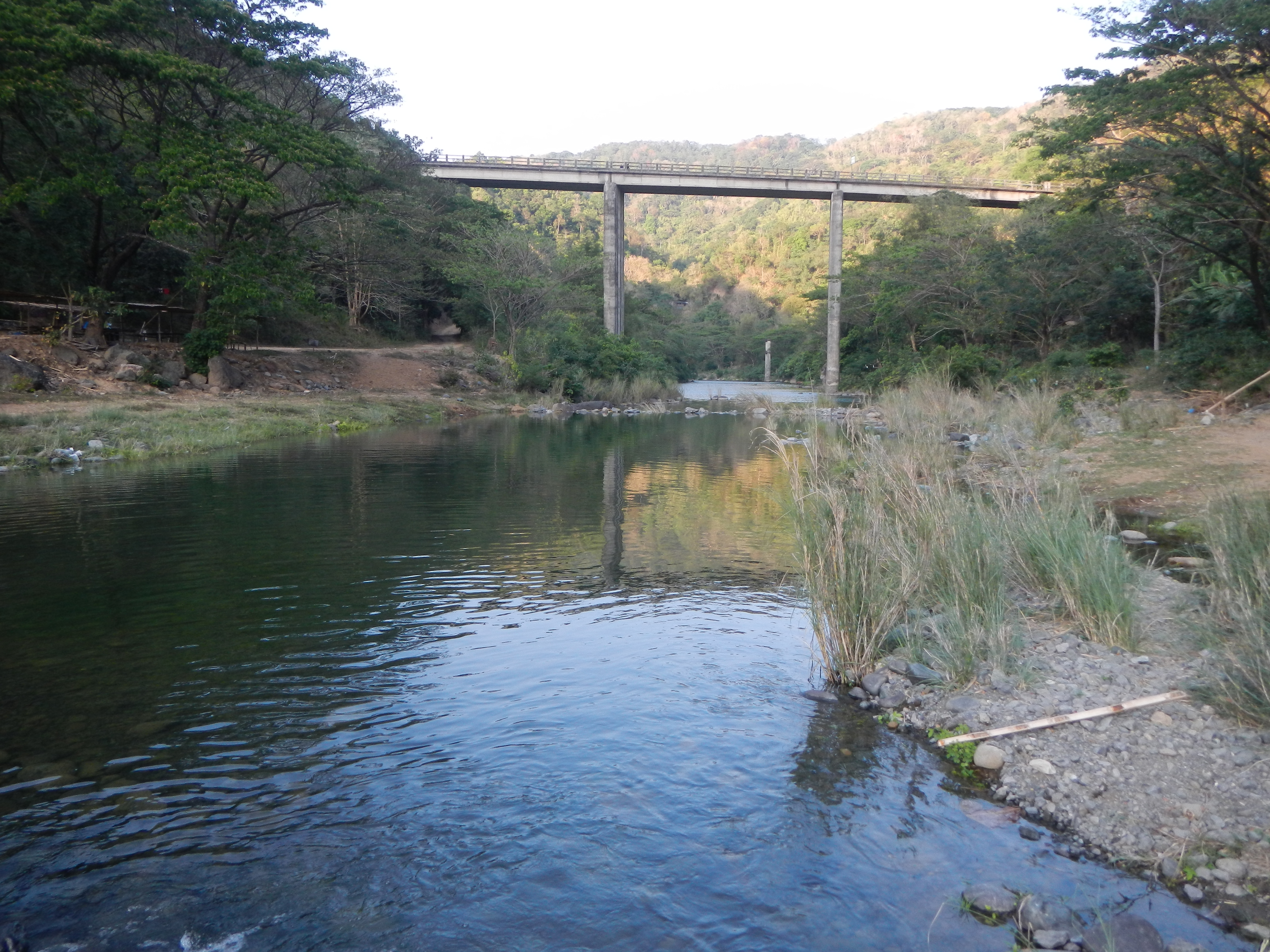
Angat River in San Lorenzo, Norzagaray

The Angat Watershed Forest Reserve is located approximately 35 kilometres (22 mi) northeast of Metro Manila largely in the mountainous eastern region of Bulacan. It contains the headwaters of the Angat River, a tributary of the Rio Grande de Pampanga, and stretches along upper Angat River from San Jose del Monte and Rodriguez to Doña Remedios Trinidad, and extending to General Tinio and General Nakar. The forest reserve is divided into two sub-catchment areas: the Forest Range and the Metro Water District. The Angat Watershed and Forest Range, also known as the Angat Watershed Management Pilot Project Reserve, covers 6,600 hectares (16,000 acres) in San Jose del Monte, Norzagaray and Rodriguez, and supports the Ipo Dam, which has a capacity of 7,500,000 cubic metres (260,000,000 ft^{3}) and a spilling level of 101 metres (331 ft). It is under the administration of the Department of Environment and Natural Resources and Metropolitan Waterworks and Sewerage System. The Metro Water District, also known as the Angat–Maasim River Watershed, covers the remaining 55,709 hectares (137,660 acres) and contains the Angat Hydroelectric Dam, which has a reservoir capacity of 850,000,000 cubic metres (3.0×10^{10} ft^{3}) and a normal water level of 212 metres (696 ft). The Angat Hydropower Corporation, a joint venture of San Miguel Corporation and K-water, has managed the reserve since taking over ownership of the hydroelectric power plant from the National Power Corporation in 2014.

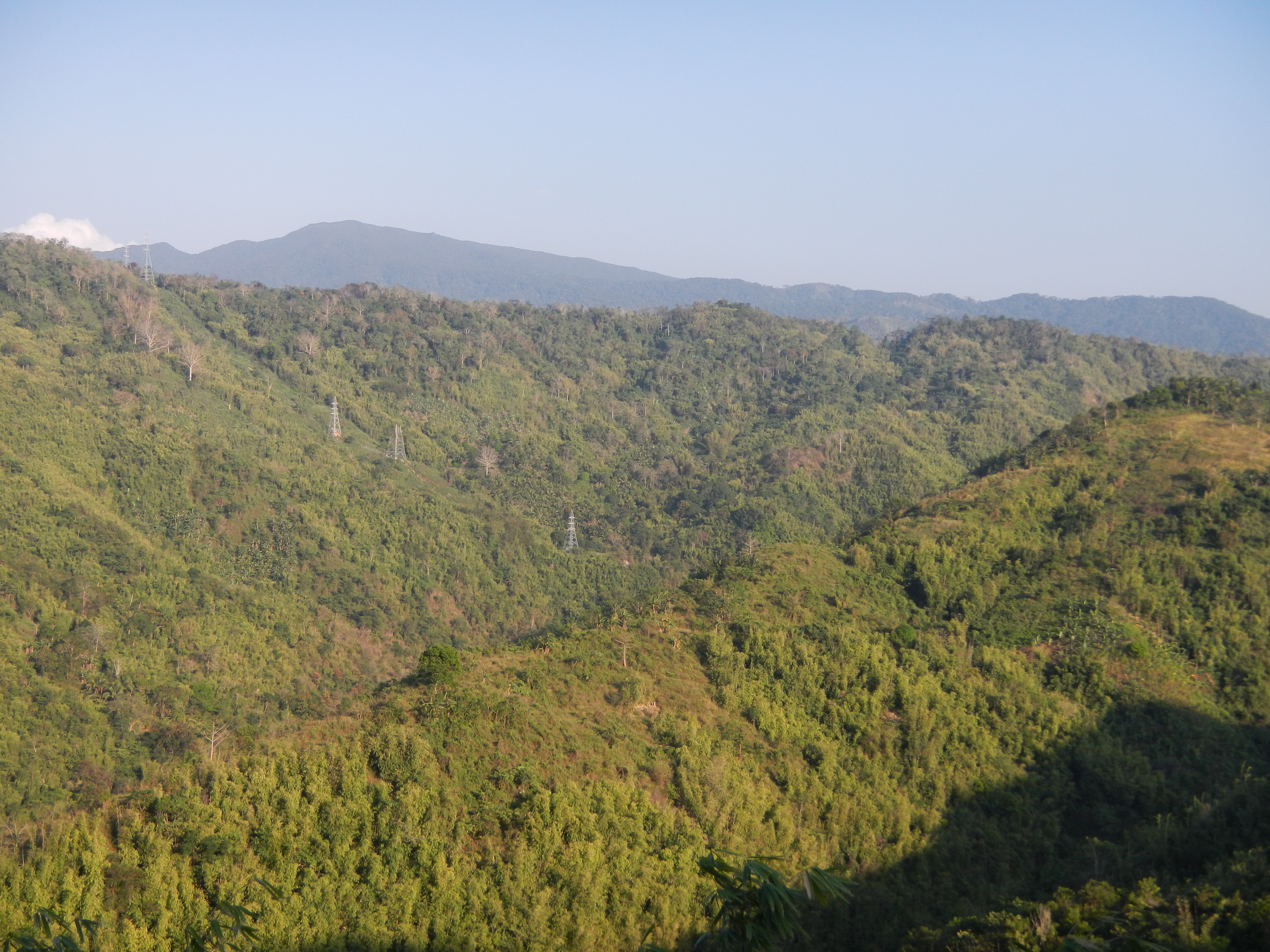
The southern Sierra Madre range in Bulacan

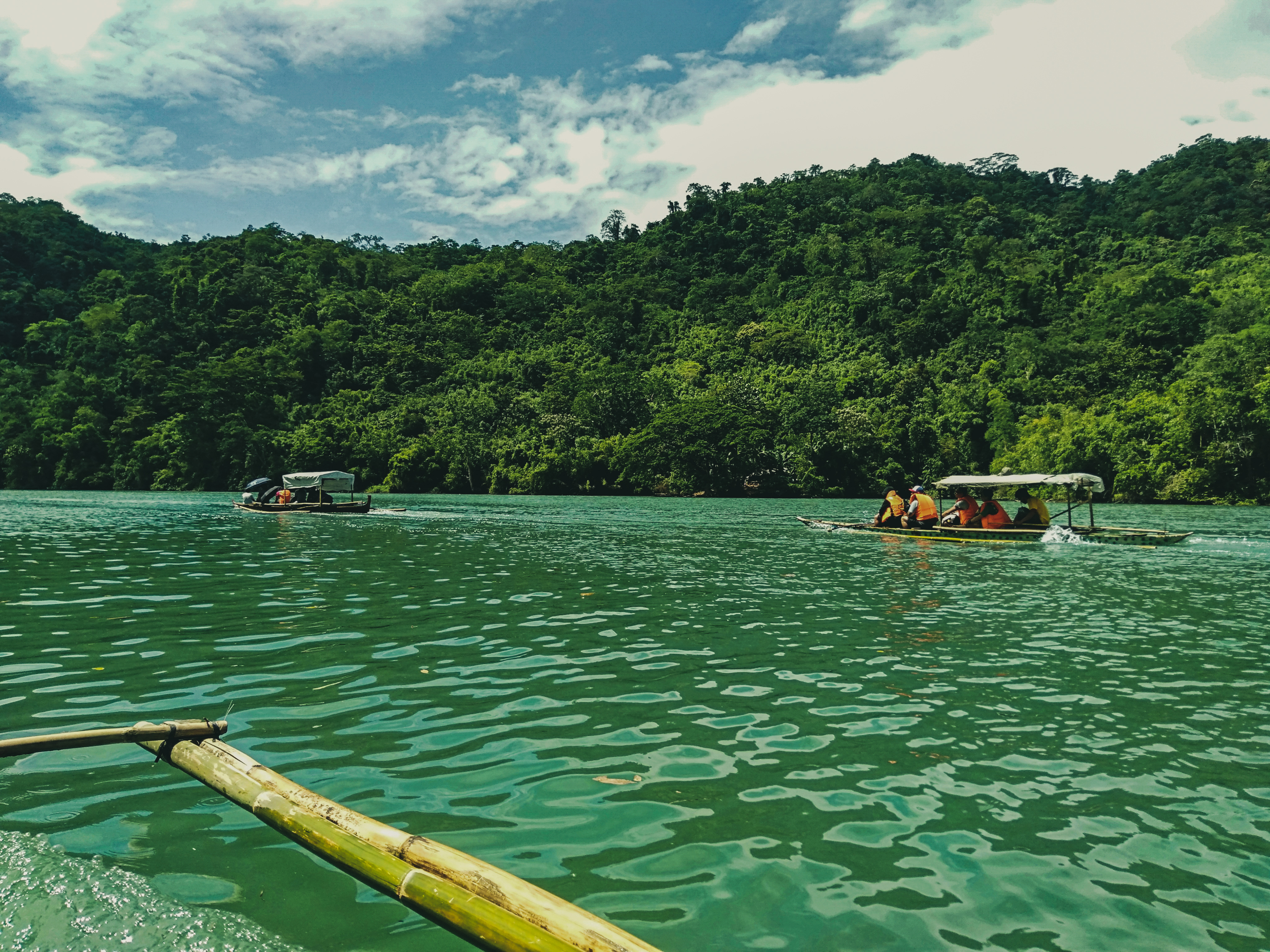
View of the Angat River from a boat

The watershed is characterized by hilly to mountainous topography and a moderate to intensive forest cover. It is considered as one of the few remaining well-forested and well-managed watersheds in the country. The highest peak in Bulacan, Mount Oriod, rises to a height of 1,206 metres (3,957 ft) at the border of the two sub-catchment areas in Norzagaray. It also contains Mount Maranat, a popular destination for hikers and is also visited for its waterfalls. These mountains in the southern Sierra Madre range feed the Angat River's water source from its three major tributaries: the Talaguio, Catmon and Matulid Rivers. It stretches downstream from the watershed into several municipalities and irrigates more than 30,000 hectares (74,000 acres) of prime agricultural lands before draining into the Pampanga River in Calumpit and eventually exiting into Manila Bay. Additional water supply is fed into the Angat reservoir through the Angat–Umiray trans-basin tunnel which runs for 13 kilometres (8.1 mi) from Umiray River on the eastern side of Sierra Madre in General Nakar.

The reserve is home to an indigenous population known as Dumagat tribe which inhabit twelve sitios in the villages of San Mateo, San Lorenzo and San Isidro in Norzagaray, and Kabayunan in Doña Remedios Trinidad. In December 2014, the National Power Corporation inaugurated the Angat Rainforest and Ecological Park within the reserve in Sitio Bitbit, San Lorenzo, Norzagaray. It offers many different opportunities for nature and outdoors enthusiasts including the hilltop view deck, ecological center, and the Tarictic fun trail. A museum of natural history is also planned for the park, as well as a Dumagat cultural heritage site, seedling propagation, rattan gene bank and a bambusetum.

The Upper Marikina River Basin Protected Landscape borders Angat Watershed on the south, while on the north, it is also contiguous with the 20,760-hectare (51,300-acre) Doña Remedios–General Tinio Watershed Forest Reserve. It is also bordered by the Biak-na-Bato National Park and Minalungao National Park on the west and northwest. It is accessible from Manila via Quirino Highway, Del Monte–Norzagaray Road and Bigte–San Mateo Road (Ipo Road) in Norzagaray.

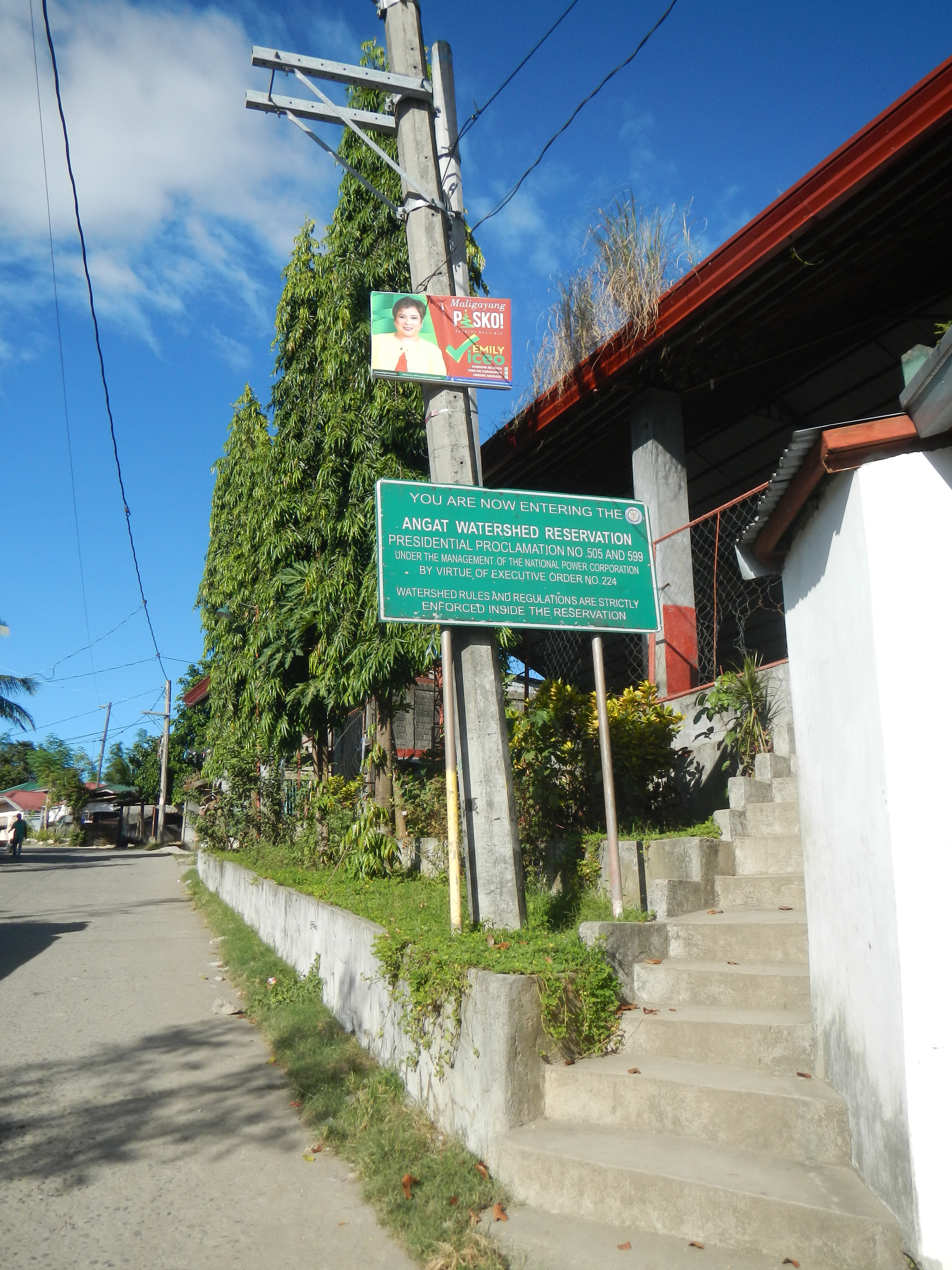
Angat Watershed welcome sign in Brgy. San Mateo, Nozagaray, Bulacan

== Biodiversity ==
The Angat Watershed supports a variety of wildlife thanks to its location in the Sierra Madre and its rich hydrology and terrestrial ecology coated by lowland dipterocarp forests, submontane forests, grasslands, secondary bamboo and scrublands. It is home to 290 endemic species of woody and non-woody plants, including the white lauan (known locally as bagtikan), tanguile, yakal, acacia and narra.

The reserve has been designated an Important Bird Area (IBA) by BirdLife International because it supports significant populations of many bird species. A good area for bird-watching, it attracts 43 different bird species, many of which are threatened or restricted. In addition to the two most visible birds in the reserve, the Luzon hornbill (known locally as kalao) and the Rufous hornbill, the reserve also attracts large flocks of spotted imperial pigeon, scale-feathered malkoha, rough-crested malkoha, grey-backed tailorbird, and Philippine eagle owl. These avian species are all endemic to the Philippines, with the Luzon hornbill and Philippine eagle-owl classified as near-threatened and vulnerable. The data-deficient Worcester's buttonquail has also been recorded in the watershed, as well as the Philippine hawk-eagle, Philippine dwarf kingfisher, green racket-tail, whiskered pitta, celestial monarch, ashy thrush, ashy-breasted flycatcher, flame-breasted fruit dove, and green-faced parrotfinch.

Two near-threatened mammals are known to roam the watershed forest at Angat, the crab-eating macaque and the Philippine warty pig. It is also a known habitat of the Philippine deer. Other rare species of note in the protected area include the blazed Luzon shrew rat, and 66 species of vertebrates, including the endemic Japanese bullet frog and marbled water monitor. The Angat reservoir is stocked with huge tilapia and eel.
