= Norzagaray =

Municipality in Bulacan, Philippines

- Municipality
- Municipality of Norzagaray
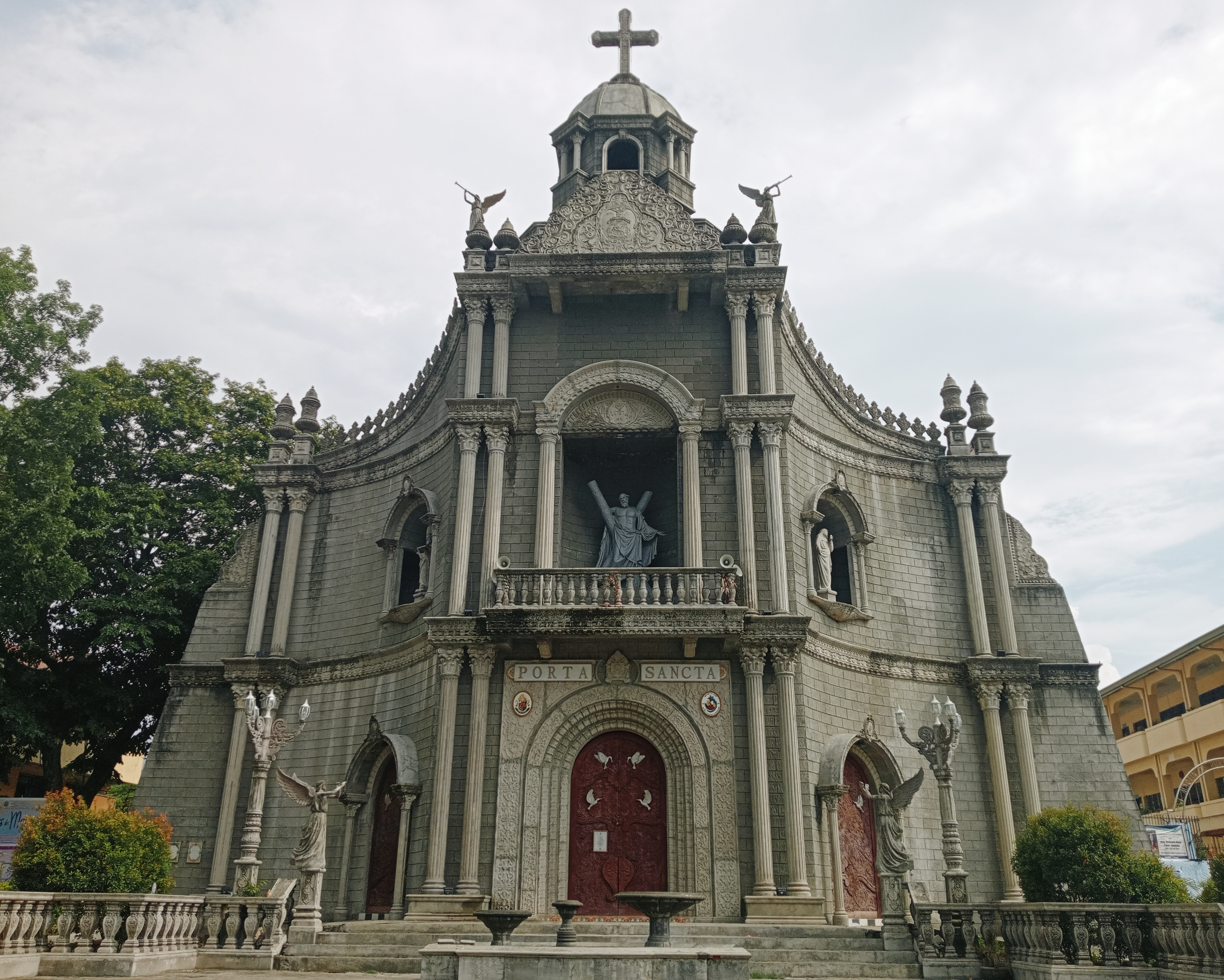
- Saint Andrew the Apostle Church

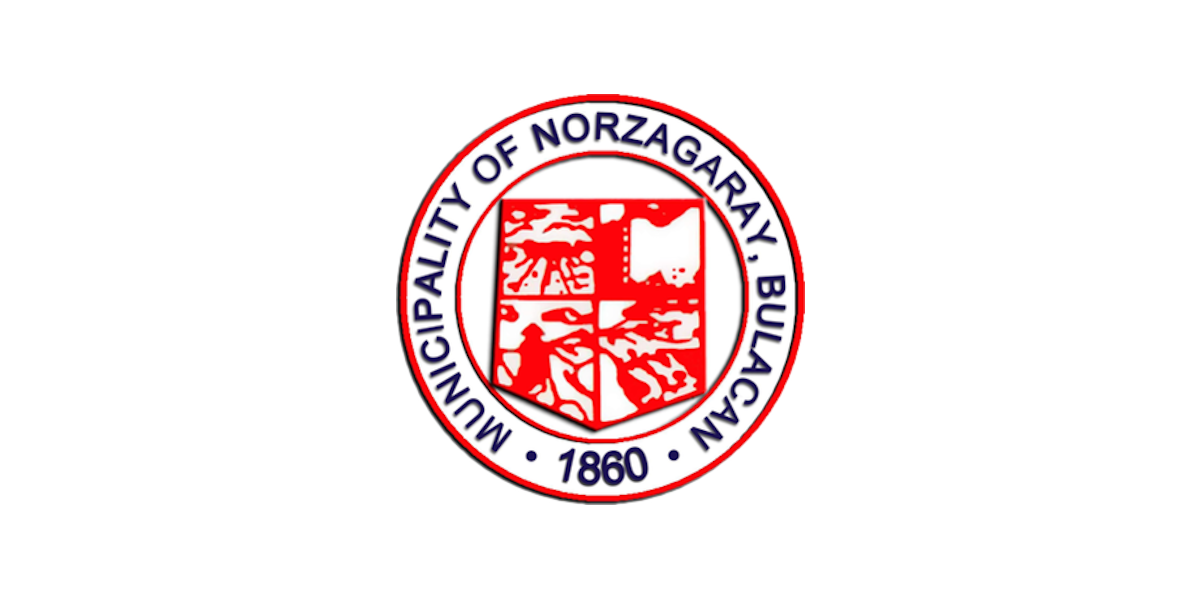
- Flag Seal

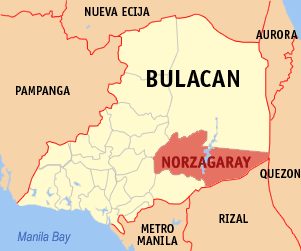
- Map of Bulacan with Norzagaray highlighted
- Interactive map of Norzagaray
- Location within the Philippines
- Coordinates: 14°55′N 121°03′E
- Country: Philippines
- Region: Central Luzon
- Province: Bulacan
- District: 6th district
- Founded: August 13, 1860
- Named for: Fernándo Norzagaray y Escudero
- Barangays: 13 (see Barangays)

Government
  - Type: Sangguniang Bayan
  - Mayor: Ma. Elena L. Germar
  - Vice Mayor: Patricio I. Gener
  - Representative: Salvador A. Pleyto Sr.
  - Municipal Council: Members: Restituto B. Sumbillo; Abbygail H. Reyes; Giulius Caezar S. Iapino; Alvin B. Cruz; Luzviminda P. Espiritu; Ma. Cleope S. Pelayo; Zosimo S. Cruz Jr.; Edsel C. Mendoza
  - Electorate: 82,038 voters (2025)

Area
  - Total: 309.77 km^{2} (119.60 sq mi)
- Elevation: 76 m (249 ft)
- Highest elevation: 236 m (774 ft)
- Lowest elevation: 26 m (85 ft)

Population (2024 census)
  - Total: 140,697
  - Density: 454.20/km^{2} (1,176.4/sq mi)
  - Households: 32,851

Economy
  - Income class: 1st municipal income class
  - Poverty incidence: 17.76% (2023)
  - Revenue: ₱ 663.6 million (2024)
  - Assets: ₱ 1,687 million (2024)
  - Expenditure: ₱ 653.1 million (2024)
  - Liabilities: ₱ 697.1 million (2024)

Utilities
  - Electricity: Meralco
- Time zone: UTC+8 (PST)
- ZIP code: 3013
- PSGC: 0301413000
- IDD : area code: +63 (0)44
- Native languages: Tagalog; Southern Alta
- Website: norzagaray.gov.ph

Norzagaray, officially the Municipality of Norzagaray (Tagalog: Bayan ng Norzagaray), is a municipality in the province of Bulacan, Philippines. According to the 2024 census, it has a population of 140,697 people.

It is the location of Angat Dam which sits on the lower realms of the Sierra Madre Mountain range. It is notable for being a major water and power supply for the National Capital Region.

== History ==
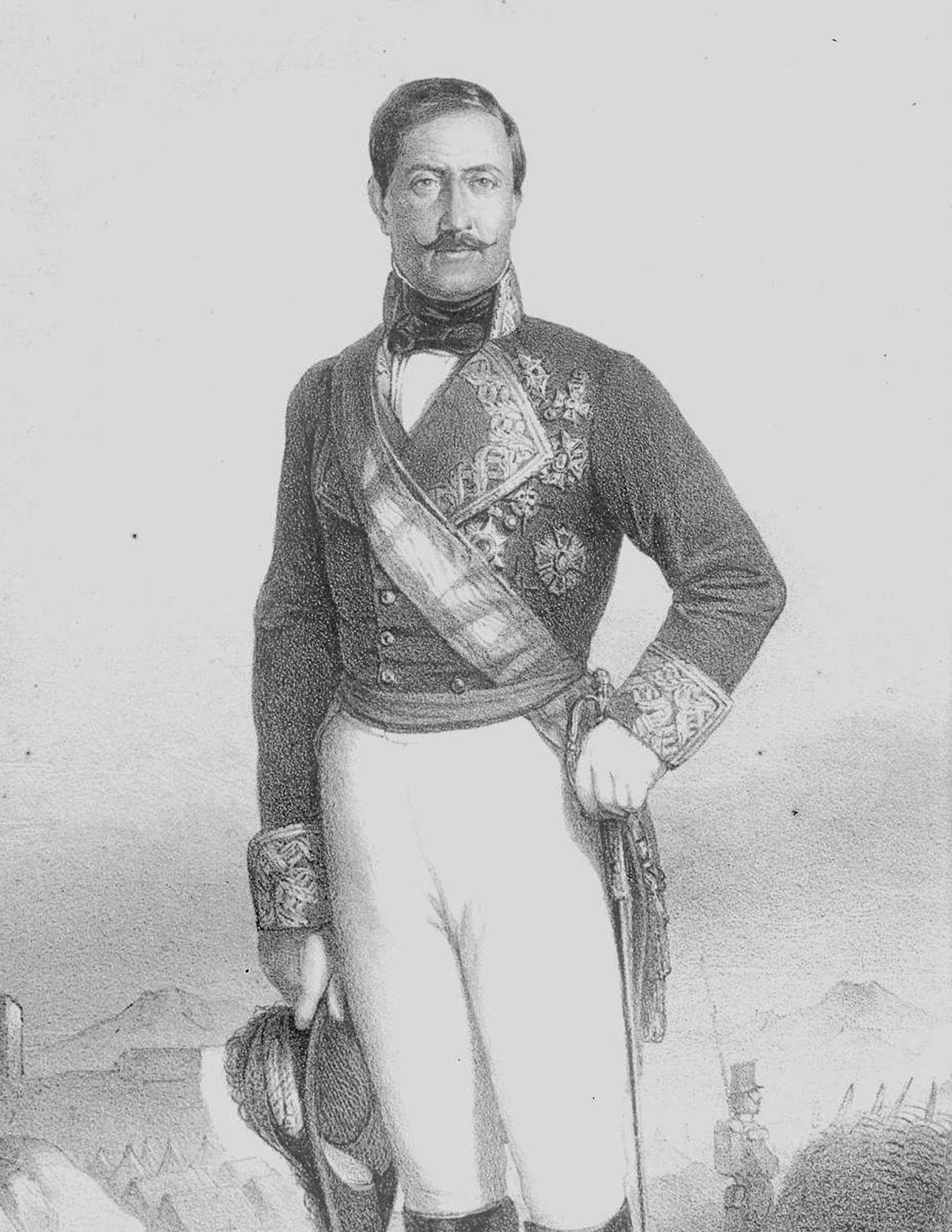
Fernándo Norzagaray y Escudero

The nucleus of what today is the town of Norzagaray traces from the old barrio Casay and barrio Matictic which was ecclesiastically and politically administered by the Augustinians from the town of Angat as its visitas as shown in the document "Mapa del Teritorio de Bulacan" by Fray Emmanuel Blanco, O.S.A. in 1832 which appeared in another document "Administracion Espiritual de los Padres Agustinos calzados de la Provincia del Dulce Nombre de Jesus de las Islas Filipinas" of Fray Francisco Villacorta in 1833.

The people of Barrio Casay worked for reforms politically, socially and economically, in order to be separated from Angat. They succeeded in their separation bid through Governor-General Fernándo Norzagaray y Escudero, who issued a Real Cedula declaring barrio Casay together with barrio Matictic to be constituted as a new independent town from Angat. Political boundaries of Angat and Pueblo de Casay y Matictic were demarcated and the newly created town was renamed as "Norzagaray" in honor of the Governor-General.

During the American occupation of the Philippines, Norzagaray was reunited with Angat by virtue of Act No. 932 beginning in 1903.

On September 13, 1977, Barangays Bayabas and Kabayunan were ceded to the newly established municipality of Doña Remedios Trinidad, by virtue of Presidential Decree No. 1196.

== Geography ==
The town of Norzagaray is bordered by San Jose del Monte, and Rodriguez, to the south; by General Nakar to the east; Santa Maria to the west; Angat to the north-west; and Doña Remedios Trinidad to the north. Norzagaray is 48 kilometres (30 mi) from Malolos, 47 kilometres (29 mi) from Manila, 17 kilometres (11 mi) from San Jose del Monte, and 4 kilometres (2.5 mi) from Angat.

Norzagaray was previously part of the 3rd district of Bulacan from 1987 to 2022, when it was moved to the newly created 6th district along with Angat and Santa Maria.

=== Barangays ===
Norzagaray is politically subdivided into 13 barangays, as shown in the matrix below. Each barangay consists of puroks and some have sitios.

Friendship Village Resources (FVR) was created as a barangay out of barangay Tigbe under Sangguniang Panlalawigan Kapasiyahan Bilang 179-T 2002 and Sangguniang Panlalawigan Kautusan Bilang 003 on April 18, 2002; it was ratified on October 12, 2002. It became a full fledged barangay on September 7, 2025 when Republic Act no. 12279 lapped into law.

PSGC	Barangay	Population			±% p.a.	
		2024		2010		
031413003	Bangkal	1.0%	1,419	1,325	▴	0.48%
031413004	Baraka	0.4%	523	581	▾	−0.73%
031413006	Bigte	8.6%	12,118	11,032	▴	0.65%
031413007	Bitungol	7.2%	10,177	8,020	▴	1.67%
031413015	Matictic	8.5%	12,025	10,395	▴	1.02%
031413016	Minuyan	7.1%	10,038	8,810	▴	0.91%
031413020	Partida	3.9%	5,422	5,267	▴	0.20%
031413021	Pinagtulayan	1.4%	1,996	1,495	▴	2.03%
031413022	Poblacion	11.6%	16,262	15,642	▴	0.27%
031413024	San Mateo	6.1%	8,630	9,089	▾	−0.36%
031413031	Tigbe	11.4%	16,058	14,846	▴	0.55%
031413032	San Lorenzo (Hilltop)	1.4%	1,990	1,980	▴	0.03%
031413033	Friendship Village Resources (FVR)	10.4%	14,690	14,613	▴	0.04%
	Total		140,697	103,095	▴	2.18%

=== Climate ===
Climate data for Norzagaray, Bulacan
Month	Jan	Feb	Mar	Apr	May	Jun	Jul	Aug	Sep	Oct	Nov	Dec	Year
Mean daily maximum °C (°F)	28 (82)	29 (84)	31 (88)	33 (91)	32 (90)	31 (88)	30 (86)	29 (84)	29 (84)	30 (86)	30 (86)	28 (82)	30 (86)
Mean daily minimum °C (°F)	20 (68)	20 (68)	21 (70)	22 (72)	24 (75)	24 (75)	24 (75)	24 (75)	24 (75)	23 (73)	22 (72)	21 (70)	22 (72)
Average precipitation mm (inches)	6 (0.2)	4 (0.2)	6 (0.2)	17 (0.7)	82 (3.2)	122 (4.8)	151 (5.9)	123 (4.8)	124 (4.9)	99 (3.9)	37 (1.5)	21 (0.8)	792 (31.1)
Average rainy days	3.3	2.5	11.7	6.6	17.7	22.2	25.2	23.7	23.2	17.9	9.2	5.2	168.4
Source: Meteoblue

== Demographics ==
Population census of Norzagaray
Year	Pop.	±% p.a.
1903	5,131	—
1918	6,747	+1.84%
1939	10,789	+2.26%
1948	13,394	+2.43%
1960	12,202	−0.77%
1970	19,144	+4.60%
1975	23,750	+4.42%
1980	26,032	+1.85%
1990	33,485	+2.55%
1995	51,015	+8.21%
2000	76,978	+9.22%
2007	105,470	+4.44%
2010	103,095	−0.83%
2015	111,348	+1.48%
2020	136,064	+4.31%
2024	140,697	+0.81%
Source: Philippine Statistics Authority

In the 2020 census, the population of Norzagaray was 136,064 people, with a density of 440 inhabitants per square kilometer or 1,100 inhabitants per square mile.

=== Languages ===
The municipality, along with two other municipalities (San Miguel and Doña Remedios Trinidad) and one city (San Jose del Monte) of Bulacan, is the homeland of the Alta Kabulowan, the first inhabitants of Bulacan, whose language is also called Alta Kabulowan. Their language is currently endangered and is in dire need of local government intervention. The majority of residents in the town are native speakers of the Tagalog language.

== Economy ==
Poverty incidence of Norzagaray (%)

Source: Philippine Statistics Authority

In 2017, Norzagaray generated a total revenue of ₱457.59 million, ₱73.23 million or 19% higher than its previous income in 2016, making it as the 4th richest municipality in Bulacan after Marilao, Santa Maria and Baliwag.

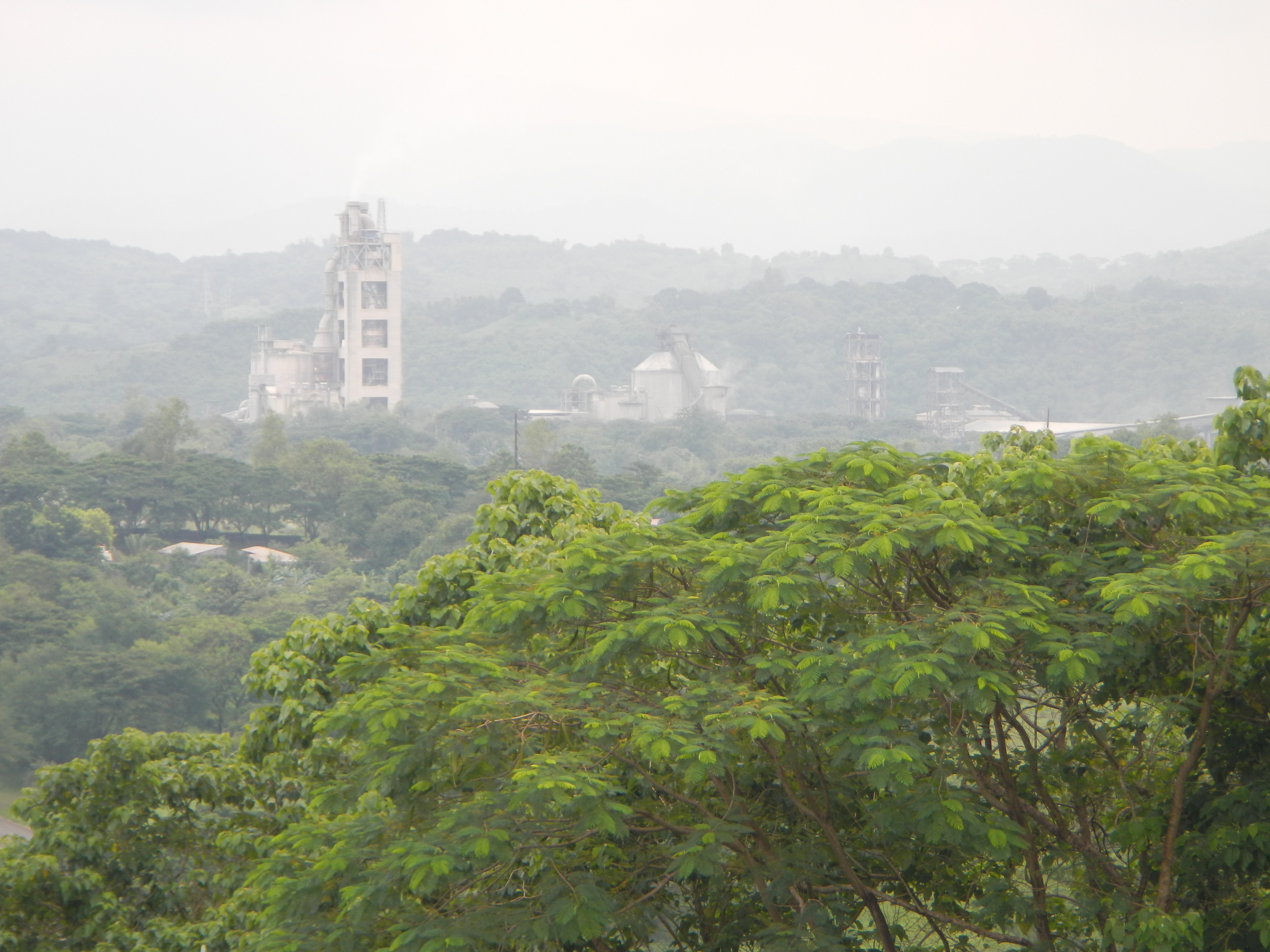
Republic Cement Plant

== Tourism ==
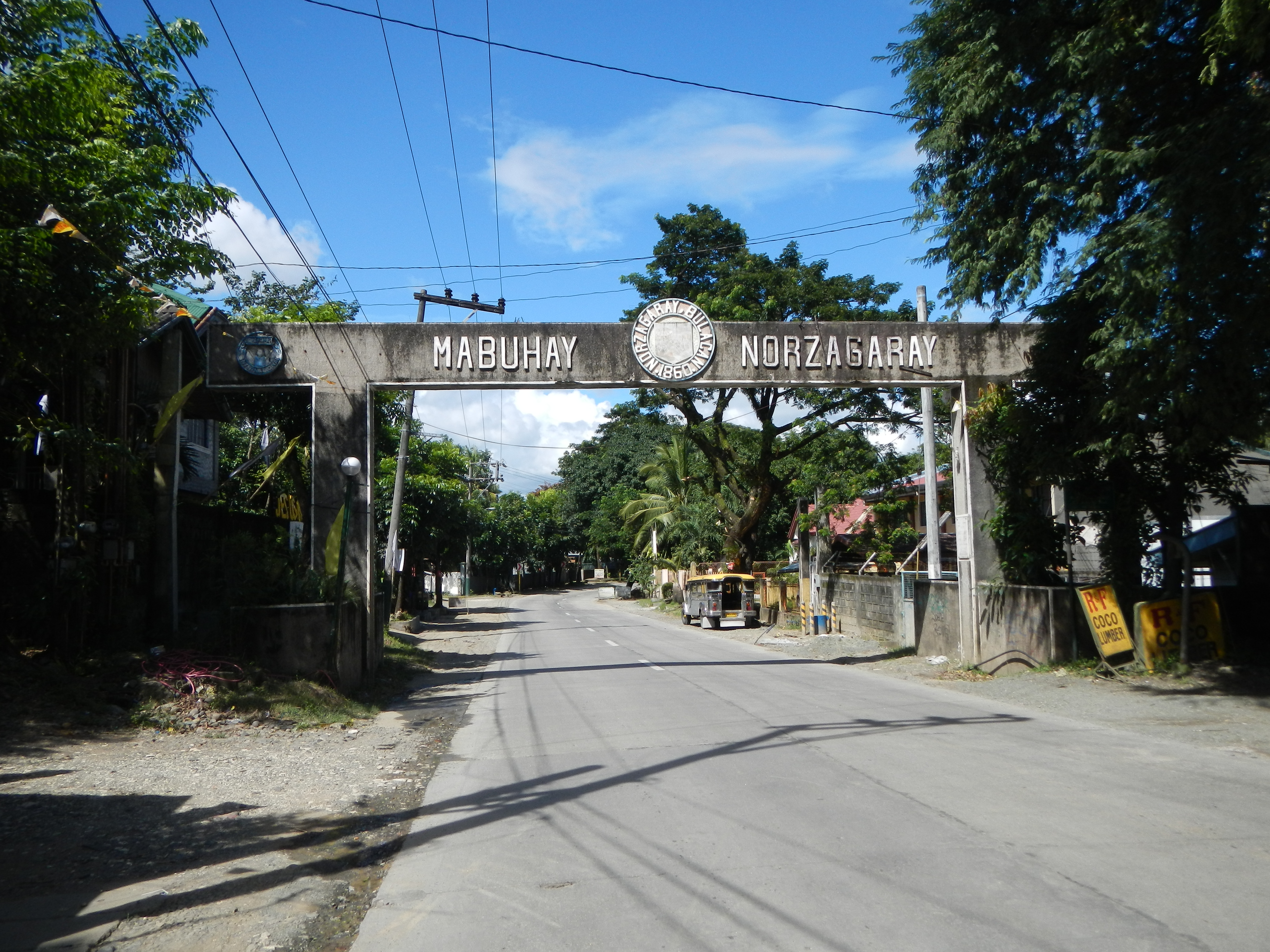
Welcome Arch

"Bakas" which is on a portion of the Angat River is recognized as one of the busiest places in the locality, particularly during summertime. People from distant towns often visit the place for relaxation. Other popular portions of Angat River are "Bitbit" and "Maramo" located on the upper potion of the river.

Another landmark is the Angat Watershed Forest Reserve where the Angat River Hydroelectric Plant or Angat Dam is located. The dam is the biggest hydroelectric plant the National Power Corporation (NPC) has ever constructed in terms of power capacity within the entire Philippines. Because of Angat Dam's size, its reservoir sinks to critical levels during the dry season necessitating the need for cloud seeding in some years. The 37-kilometer (23 mi) reservoir of this hydroelectric plant is covered with forests producing a cool climate.

Another is the Pinagrealan Cave located in Barangay Bigte. This cave is a subterranean network of caverns extending more than a kilometer deep. The Katipunero Revolutionaries during the war against Spain used it as a camp in 1896 and again during the Filipino-American War in 1898 as hideout of General Emilio Aguinaldo (the First President of the Philippines). It was also used as a sanctuary by the Japanese Imperial Army when the Philippines was liberated by joint Filipino and American Forces.

== Religion ==
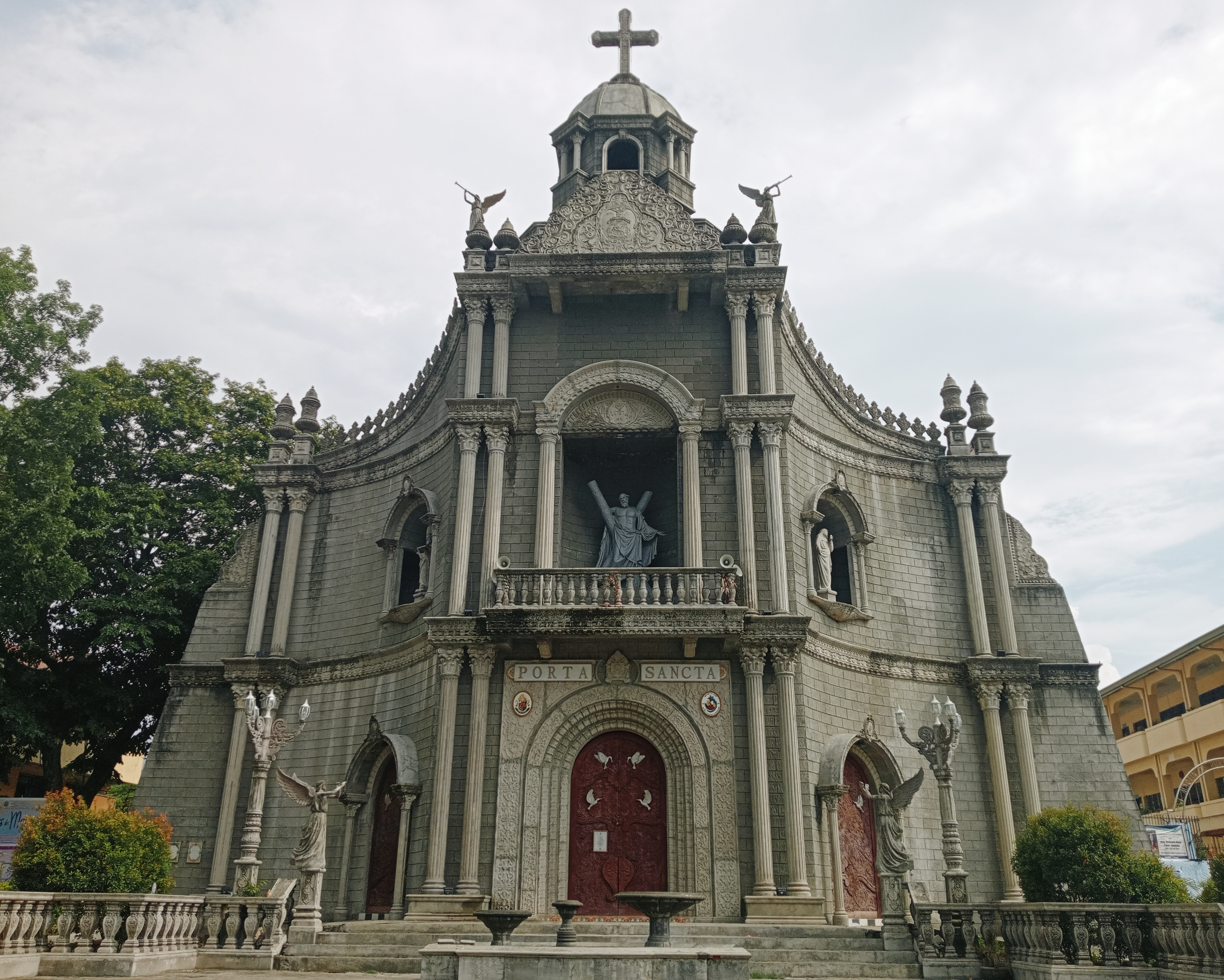
St. Andrew the Apostle Parish

- St. Andrew the Apostle Parish (Poblacion, Norzagaray, Bulacan)
- Virgen de las Flores Parish (Bigte, Norzagaray, Bulacan)
- Seventh-day Adventist church
- Iglesia ni Cristo church
- Members Church of God International Locale Congregation of Norzagaray
- Members Church of God International Locale Congregation of North Hill Village
- Members Church of God International Locale Congregation of Hill Top
- Jesus is Lord Church Worldwide (JIL)

== Government ==
=== Local government ===
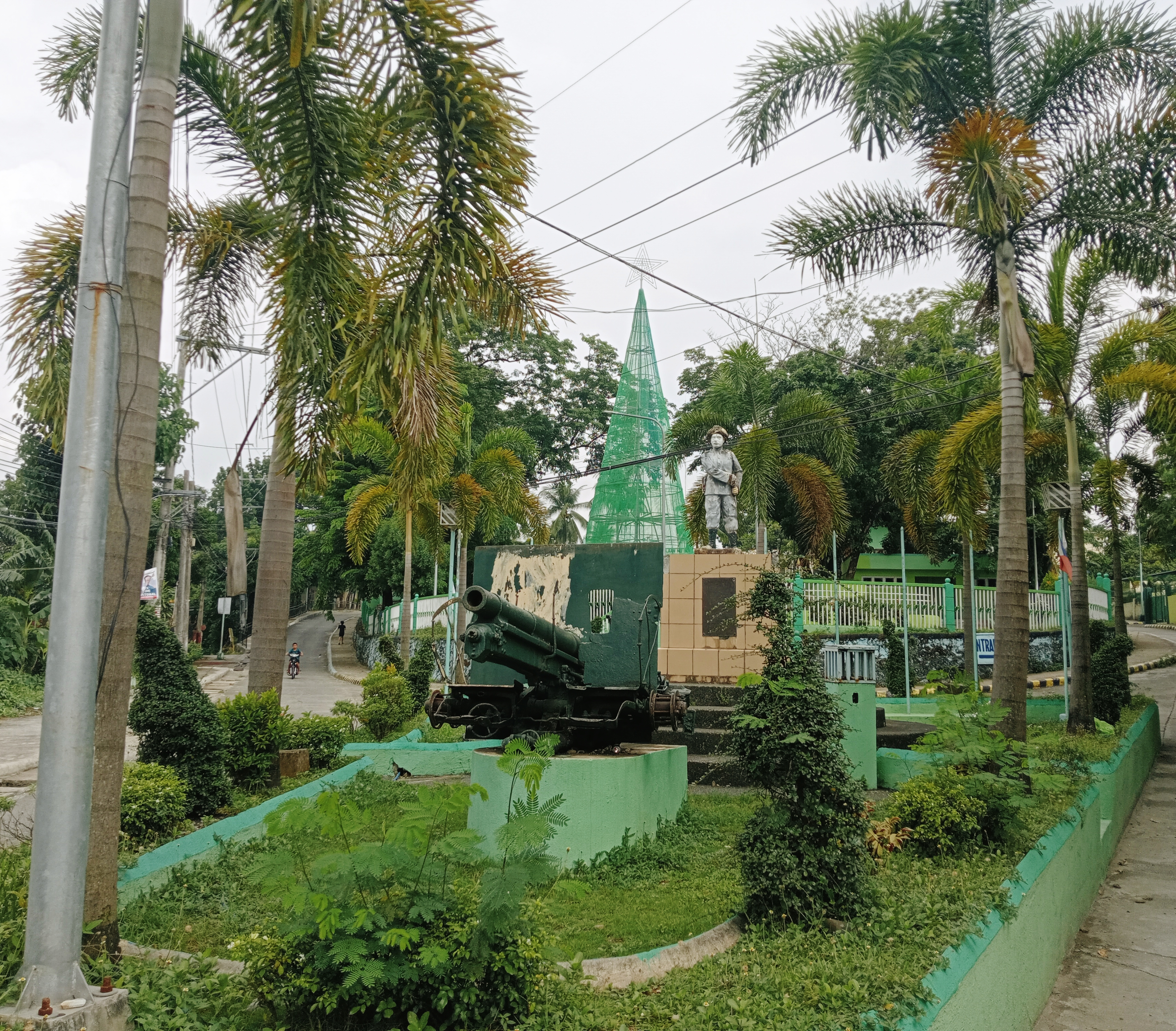
Norzagaray Municipal Park

Just like the national government, the municipal government is divided into three branches: executive, legislative and judiciary. The judicial branch is administered solely by the Supreme Court of the Philippines. The LGUs have control of the executive and legislative branch.

The seat of government is vested upon the Mayor and other elected officers who hold office at the municipal hall. The Sangguniang Bayan is the center of legislation of the municipality.

== Education ==
The Norzagaray Schools District Office governs all educational institutions within the municipality. It oversees the management and operations of all private and public, from primary to secondary schools.

=== Primary and elementary schools ===
- Apugan Elementary School
- Banahaw Elementary School
- Bangkal Elementary School
- Baraka Elementary School
- Bigte Elementary School
- Bitungol Elementary School
- Caimino Elementary School
- Children's House and Learning Academy of Bulacan
- Coral Elementary School
- Dike Elementary School
- FVR Phase 2 Elementary School
- FVR Phase 3 Elementary School
- Ipo Elementary School
- Kanyakan Elementary School
- Karahumi Elementary School
- Luis Gravador Elementary School
- Maranatha Christian Academy
- Mary Josette Academy
- Matictic Elementary School
- North Hills Village Elementary School
- Norzagaray Academy
- Norzagaray Adventist Elementary School
- Norzagaray Elementary School
- National Power Corporation Elementary School
- Padling Elementary School
- Partida Elementary School
- Pinagtulayan Elementary School
- San Mateo Elementary School
- Sapang Kawayan Elementary School
- Sapang Munti Elementary School
- School of St. Ignatius
- Shechem Polytechnic Institute
- Shepherd Staff Christian School
- St. Gabriel School of Norzagaray
- St. Martin de Porres Catholic School
- The English Cherries
- Timoteo Policarpio Memorial Elementary School (Minuyan Elementary School)

=== Secondary schools ===
- FVR National High School
- Julian B. Sumbillo High School
- Minuyan National High School
- National Power Corporation High School
- North Hills Village High School
- Norzagaray National High School
- Senior High School within Luis Gravador Elementary School

== Gallery ==
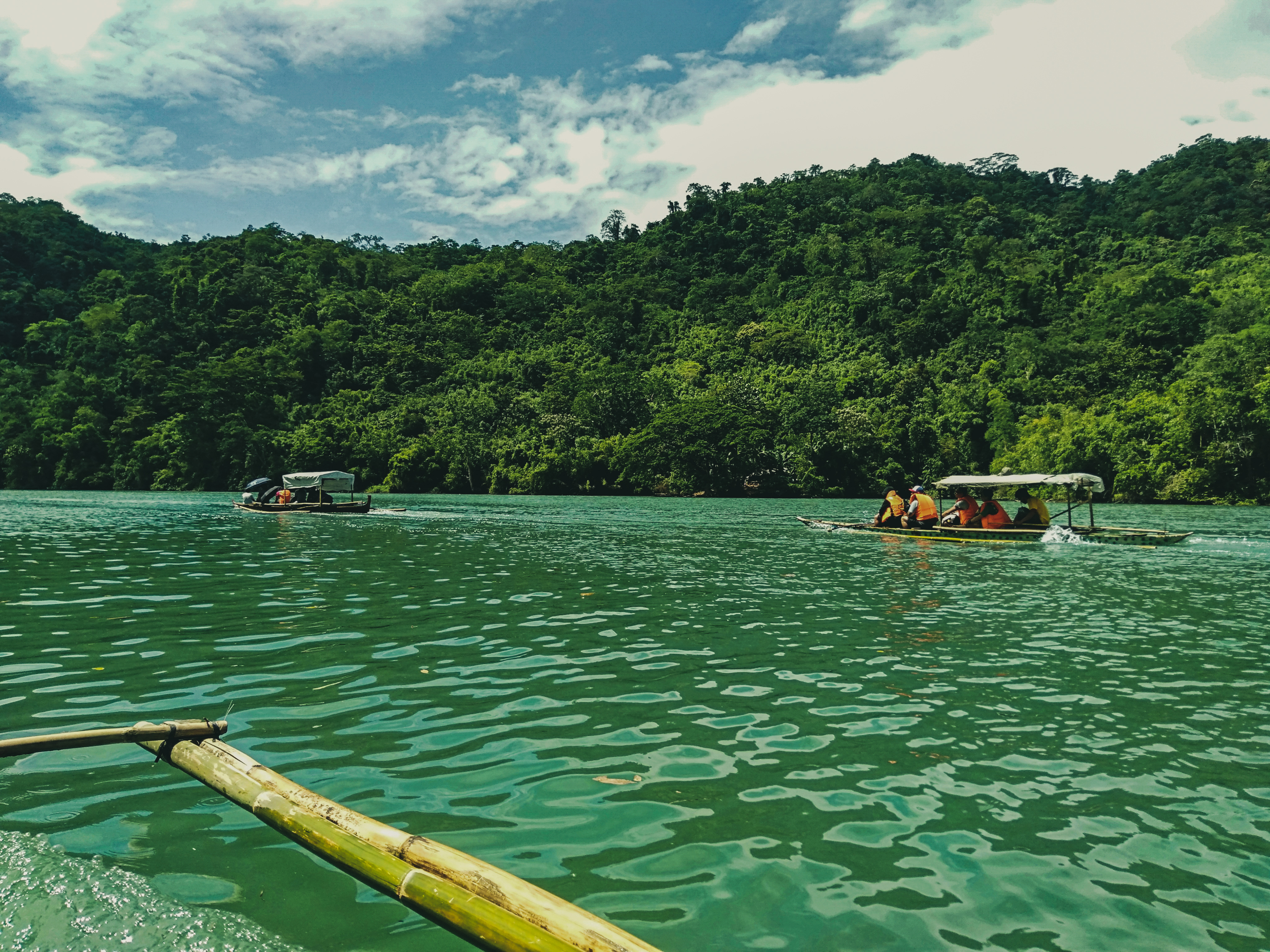
Angat Watershed Forest Reserve

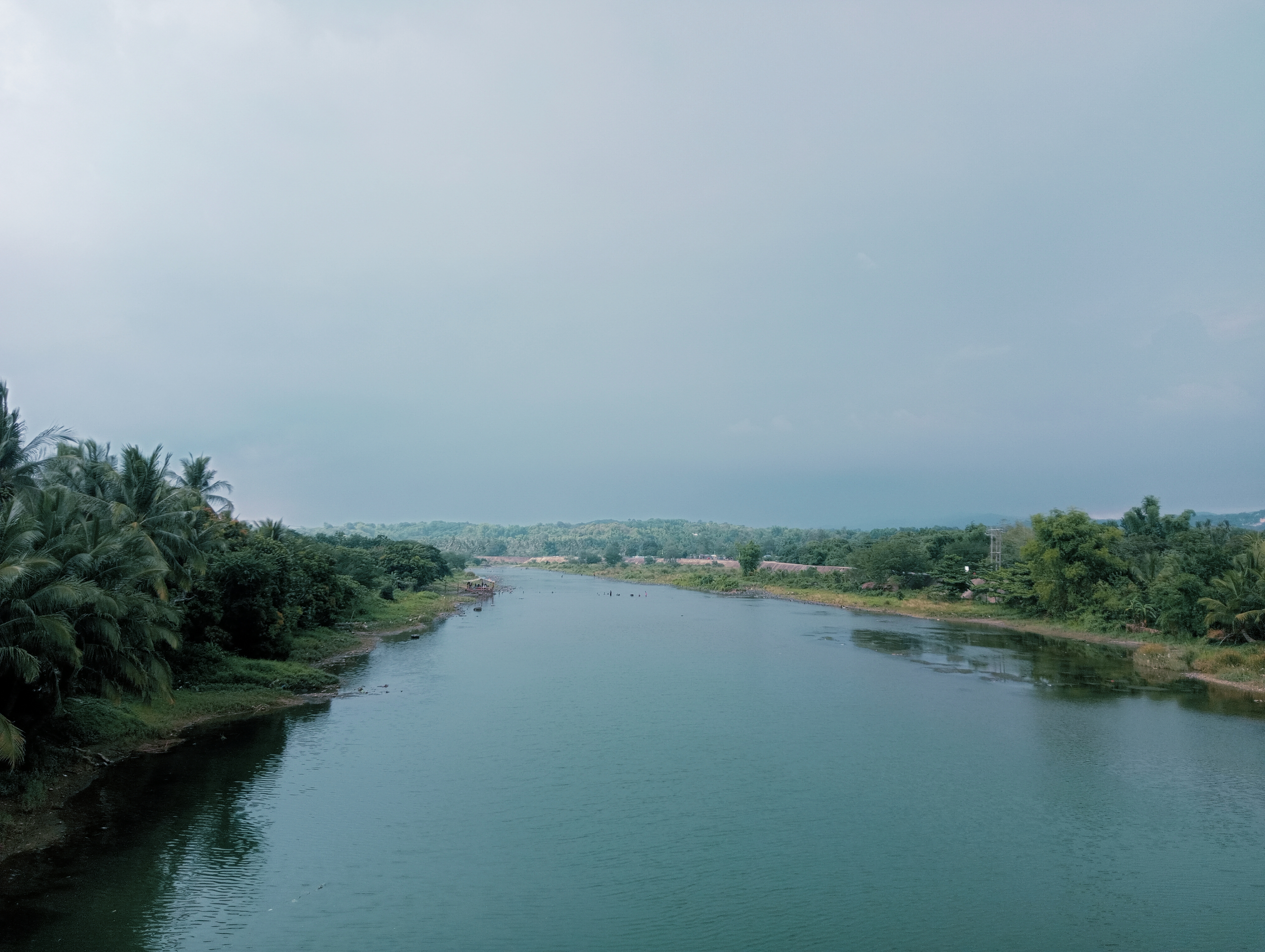
View of Angat River (Bakas River) from Matictic Bridge

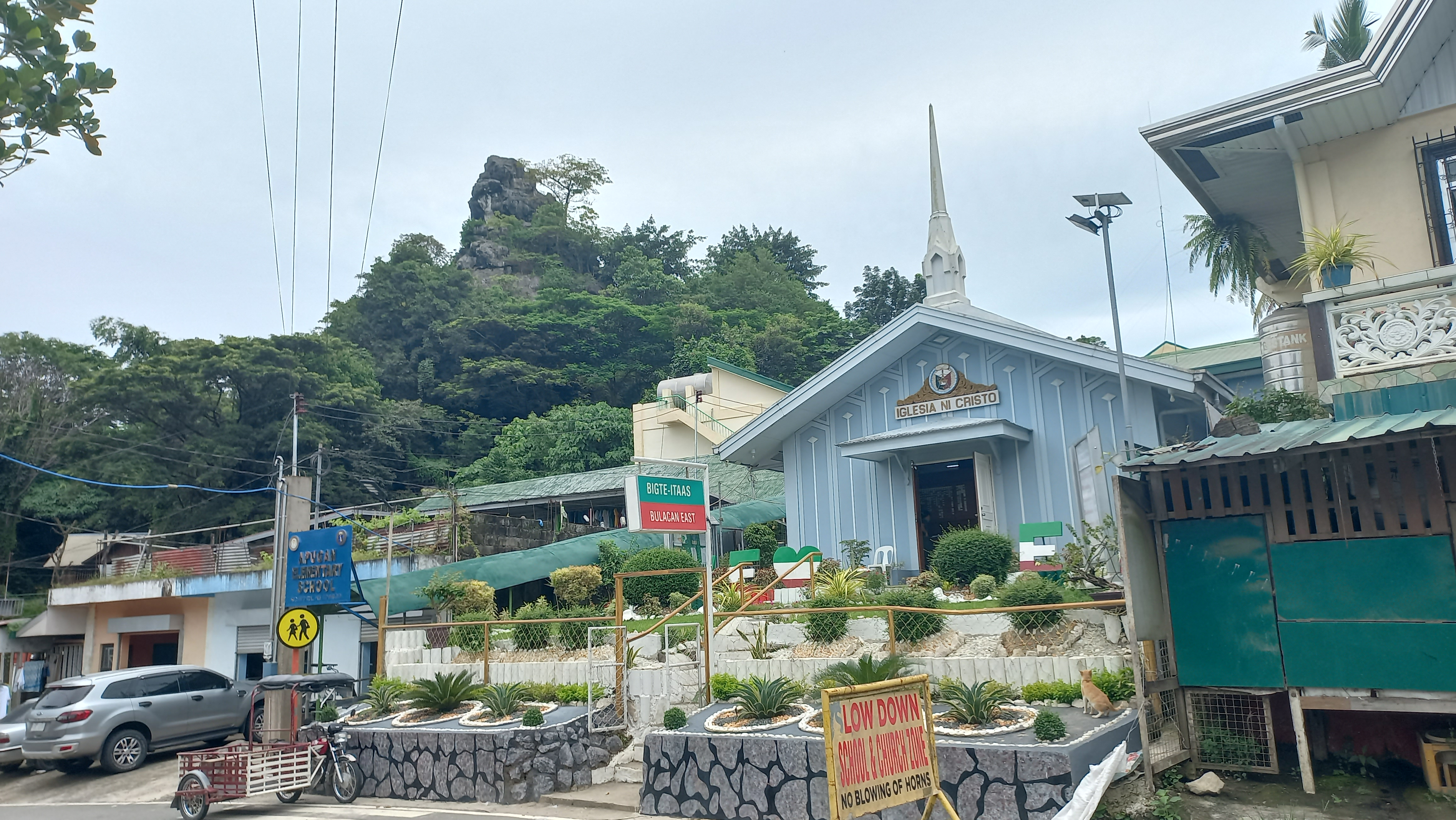
Rhinoceros rock formation behind a chapel of Iglesia ni Cristo in Barangay Bigte

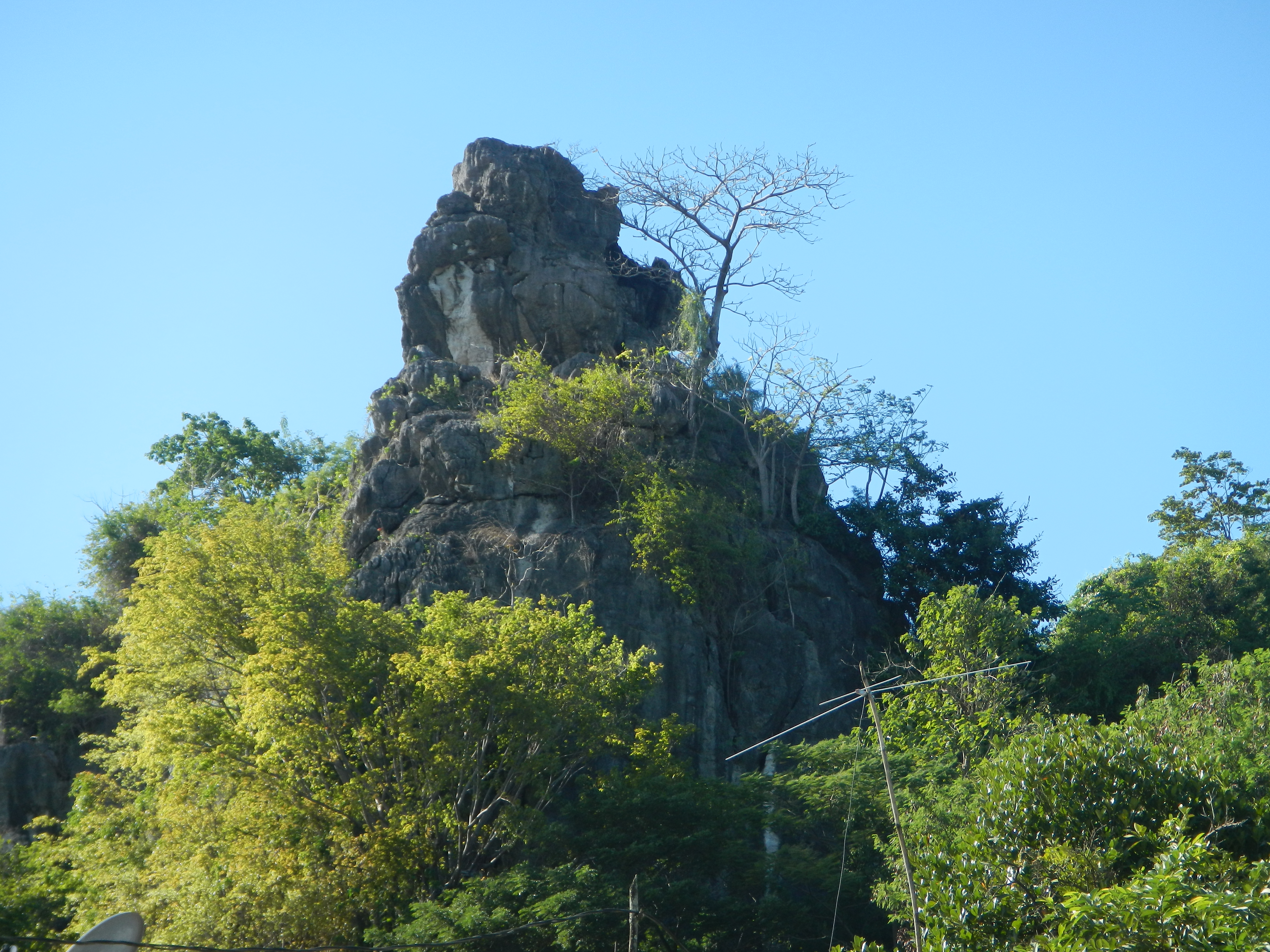
Rhinoceros rock formation zoomed view
