= Dingalan =

Municipality in Aurora, Philippines

- Municipality
- Municipality of Dingalan
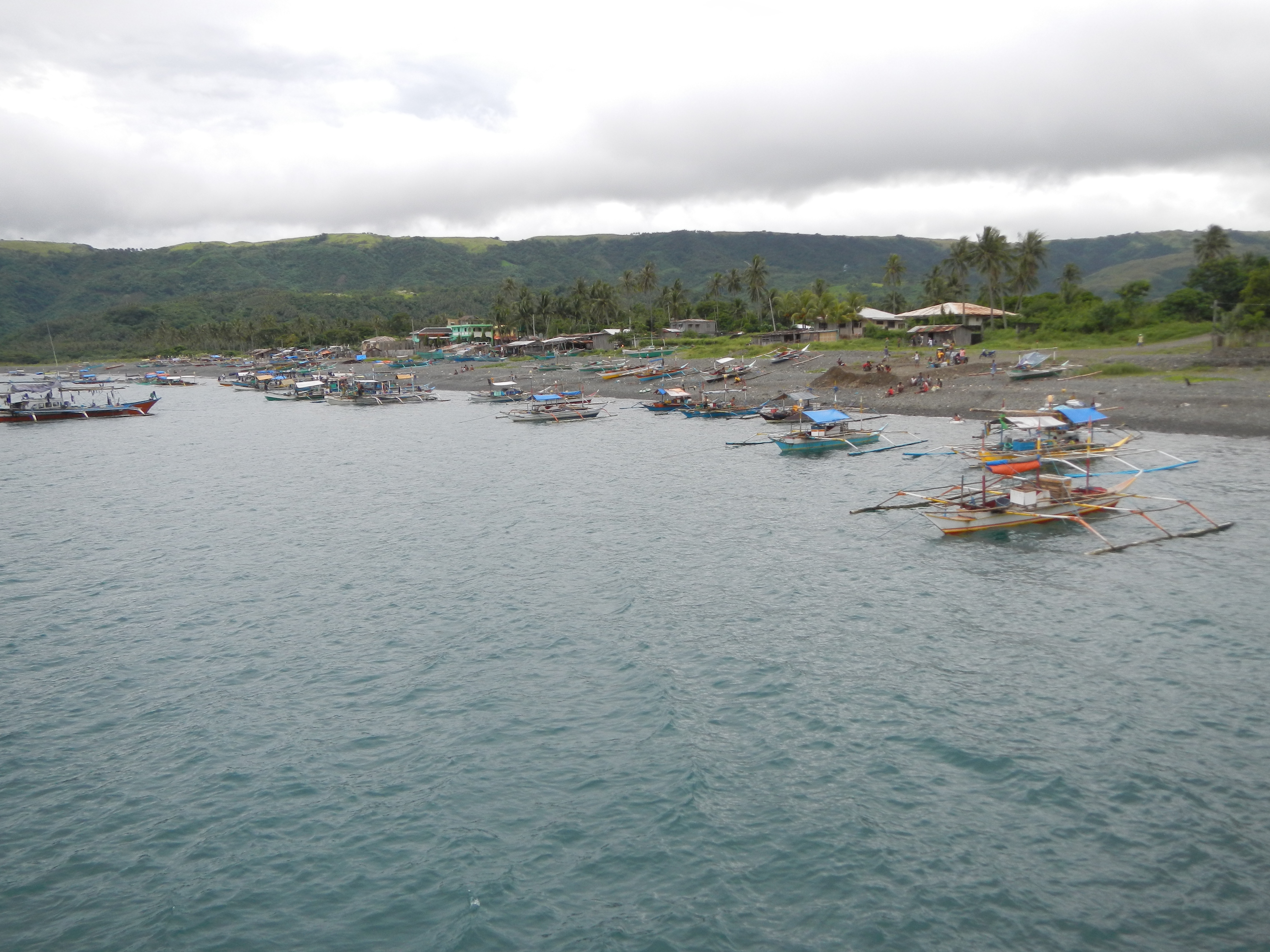
- Fisherfolk at Aplaya

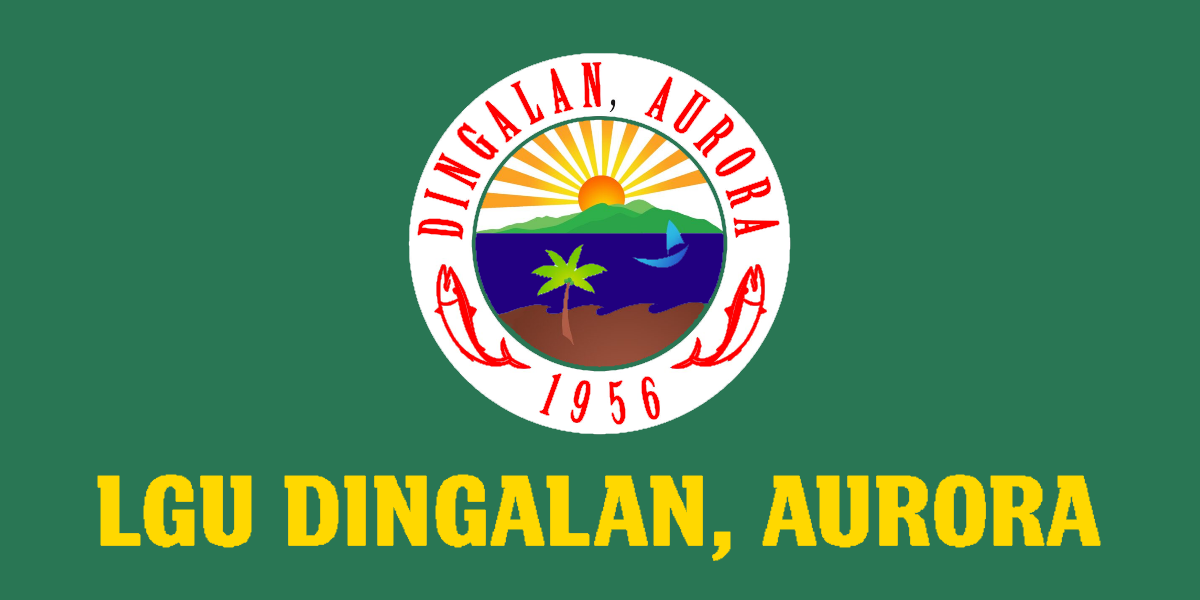
- Flag
- Nickname: Gateway to Southern Tagalog
- Motto: Positibo, Agresibo, Progresibong Pagbabago
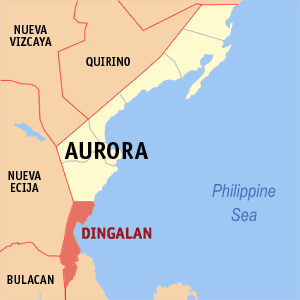
- Map of Aurora with Dingalan highlighted
- Interactive map of Dingalan
- Location within the Philippines
- Coordinates: 15°23′N 121°24′E
- Country: Philippines
- Region: Central Luzon
- Province: Aurora
- District: Lone district
- Founded: 1962
- Barangays: 11 (see Barangays)

Government
  - Type: Sangguniang Bayan
  - Mayor: Aurora G. Taay
  - Vice Mayor: Abigail G. Tan
  - Representative: Rommel Rico T. Angara
  - Municipal Council: Members: Nhorwin G. Capulong; June Michael N. Dagasdas; Sheldon H. Taay; Mylene M. Figuracion; Marinita B. Dela Cruz; Conrado L. De Guzman Jr.; Ian Ildefonso Joseph-Mary B. Evangelista; Arnel P. Mendizabal
  - Electorate: 20,361 voters (2025)

Area
  - Total: 304.55 km^{2} (117.59 sq mi)
- Elevation: 272 m (892 ft)
- Highest elevation: 1,367 m (4,485 ft)
- Lowest elevation: 0 m (0 ft)

Population (2024 census)
  - Total: 29,286
  - Density: 96.162/km^{2} (249.06/sq mi)
  - Households: 6,854
- Demonym: Dingaleño

Economy
  - Income class: 2nd municipal income class
  - Poverty incidence: 15.08% (2023)
  - Revenue: ₱ 218.9 million (2024)
  - Assets: ₱ 670.6 million (2024)
  - Expenditure: ₱ 239.9 million (2024)
  - Liabilities: ₱ 276.7 million (2024)

Service provider
  - Electricity: Aurora Electric Cooperative (AURELCO)
- Time zone: UTC+8 (PST)
- ZIP code: 3207
- PSGC: 0307705000
- IDD : area code: +63 (0)42
- Native languages: Umiray Dumaget; Tagalog; Ilocano
- Website: www.dingalanlgu.gov.ph

Dingalan [ˌdiŋɡɐˈlan], officially the Municipality of Dingalan (Tagalog: Bayan ng Dingalan; Ilocano: Ili ti Dingalan), is a municipality in the province of Aurora, Philippines. According to the 2024 census, it has a population of 29,286 people.

The town has several caves, of which the Lamao Caves are the best known. The rough shoreline and very high waves of Dingalan make it attractive to surfers. Dingalan is nicknamed "Gateway to Southern Tagalog", as it is bordered by Quezon Province (in the south), which is part of Southern Tagalog, of which Aurora was a part; Aurora was a sub-province of Quezon.

== History ==
Map of the district of Infanta where Dingalan was formerly located in 1899.

Early settlers recounted that Dumagat tribes inhabited the territory now known as Dingalan. The names of most landmarks and places in this municipality were said to have been given by these first inhabitants. It is believed that the name “Dingalan” is a Dumagat word which means “by the River of Galan” because the territory straddles fifteen (15) rivers and streams which show the abundance of water.

It is also believed that there were two Dumagat brothers named Ding and Allan who were hunting animals in the forest. They were shouting each other’s name as they got separated from each other hence the name DINGALAN.

In the early 1900s, settlers from Quezon, Nueva Ecija, and Ilocos started to migrate to Dingalan. They were generally lowland cultivators in search of arable land. In-migration heightened in the 1930s when Don Felipe Buencamino started his logging and sawmill operations. Soon after, inter-marriages among Tagalogs, Ilocanos, Pampangos (Kapampangans), and Bicolanos enriched the cultural stock of settlers.

During World War II, Dingalan was occupied by the Japanese imperial forces. The Japanese took over the operation of sawmills and cut timber to construct their barracks and garrisons. The Dingalan-Gabaldon highway was originally built (1942-1945) as a logging road. On the verge of defeat in 1945, the Japanese used Dingalan Bay as an “exit point” when they retreated.

The strategic location of Dingalan Bay for military purposes was rediscovered after the RP-US Mutual Defense Treaty of 1951, when the municipality became the Training Ground in 1957 for the South East Asia Treaty Organization (SEATO) as well as the United States Seventh Fleet. Dingalan also became a site of the RP-US Balikatan Military Exercises for three (3) consecutive years from 1982-1984.

Dingalan was recognized as a municipal district on June 16, 1956 under Republic Act 1536 with an initial population of 2,000 residents. Prior to that, Dingalan was merely a sitio of Barrio San Luis in the municipality of Baler, then part of Quezon (formerly Tayabas). Dingalan became a regular municipality on June 16, 1962 by virtue of Republic Act No. 3490. It was then part of Quezon under its sub-province of Aurora until the latter became a province of its own in 1979.

From the 1930s to 1990s, logging was the main driver of Dingalan’s economy and the principal magnet to migrants. In the 1970s, three logging companies operated in Dingalan namely; Dingalan Wood Industries Corporation (DWICO), South Eastern Timber Corporation (SETIC) of Mr. Roberto Gopuansoy, and Inter-Pacific Forest Resources Company. They obtained a combined allowable cut of 169,416 cubic meters (5,982,900 cu ft) of lumber per annum, roughly equivalent to 4,500 fully loaded ten-wheeler trucks each year.

Because of relentless logging between 1930 and 1995, Dingalan today has only 2% of its original old growth dipterocarp forest. More than 10% of the area is denuded or devoid of trees. Its rate of deforestation is faster than the country’s average of 1.4% per year. The brownish color of Dingalan’s river channels reveals the extent of soil erosion and siltation resulting from the loss of tree cover upstream.

== Geography ==
According to the Philippine Statistics Authority, the municipality has a land area of 304.55 square kilometres (117.59 sq mi), constituting 9.68% of the 3,147.32-square-kilometer- (1,215.19 sq mi) total area of Aurora.

Dingalan is situated 140.93 kilometers (87.57 mi) from the provincial capital Baler, and 227.31 kilometers (141.24 mi) from the country's capital city of Manila. It is bounded on the north by San Luis, west by Gabaldon, General Tinio, and Doña Remedios Trinidad, south by General Nakar, and east by the Benham Rise or Plateau and Philippine Sea.

It is a small town with one main cemented road with branching alleys. Further south of the town proper are the barangays of Aplaya, Butas na Bato, Matawe, Ibona, Dikapanikian and Umiray. The premier barangay north of the town is Paltic. All of the barangays are located on the seashore, except for Poblacion and two barangays located in the mountains. The whole town is mountainous due to the Sierra Madre. The Umiray River separates the town from Quezon Province.

The National Government has an ongoing move to transfer Municipality of Dingalan to become part of Nueva Ecija Province for the reason that the said municipality is geographically and strategically within the said Province. This was favored by most of the residents was opposed by the Provincial Government of Aurora. One reason is that you must travel via the province of Nueva Ecija before reaching the province of Aurora, which is especially difficult during disasters. It is more economical and practical to deliver Dingalan to the province of Nueva Ecija.

=== Barangays ===
Dingalan is politically subdivided into 11 barangays. Each barangay consists of puroks and some have sitios.

PSGC	Barangay	Population			±% p.a.	
		2024		2010		
037705001	Aplaya	6.2%	1,802	1,619	▴	0.75%
037705002	Butas Na Bato	3.1%	909	813	▴	0.78%
037705003	Matawe (Cabog)	11.5%	3,356	3,090	▴	0.58%
037705004	Caragsacan	10.2%	2,992	2,729	▴	0.64%
037705005	Davildavilan	3.5%	1,036	992	▴	0.30%
037705006	Dikapanikian	1.4%	404	387	▴	0.30%
037705007	Ibona	12.4%	3,624	3,185	▴	0.90%
037705009	Paltic	17.3%	5,075	5,029	▴	0.06%
037705010	Poblacion	3.7%	1,084	1,091	▾	−0.04%
037705011	Tanawan	2.8%	820	656	▴	1.56%
037705013	Umiray (Malamig)	15.0%	4,380	3,963	▴	0.70%
	Total		29,286	23,554	▴	1.52%

== Local Government ==
2025-2028 Dingalan, Aurora Officials
Position	Name	Party
Mayor	Aurora G. Taay	LDP
Vice Mayor	Abigail G. Tan	LDP
Councilors	Nhorwin G. Capulong	LDP
Councilors	June Michael N. Dagasdas	LDP
Councilors	Sheldon H. Taay	Lakas
Councilors	Mylene M. Figuracion	LDP
Councilors	Marinita B. Dela Cruz	LDP
Councilors	Conrado L. De Guzman Jr.	LDP
Councilors	Ian Ildefonso Joseph-Mary B. Evangelista	LDP
Councilors	Arnel P. Mendizabal	Independent
Ex Officio Municipal Council Members
ABC President	TBD	Nonpartisan
SK Federation President	TBD	Nonpartisan

=== Climate ===
Climate data for Dingalan, Aurora
Month	Jan	Feb	Mar	Apr	May	Jun	Jul	Aug	Sep	Oct	Nov	Dec	Year
Mean daily maximum °C (°F)	26 (79)	27 (81)	29 (84)	31 (88)	31 (88)	30 (86)	30 (86)	30 (86)	29 (84)	29 (84)	28 (82)	27 (81)	29 (84)
Mean daily minimum °C (°F)	20 (68)	20 (68)	21 (70)	22 (72)	24 (75)	24 (75)	24 (75)	24 (75)	23 (73)	23 (73)	22 (72)	21 (70)	22 (72)
Average precipitation mm (inches)	21 (0.8)	18 (0.7)	16 (0.6)	18 (0.7)	65 (2.6)	102 (4.0)	112 (4.4)	95 (3.7)	91 (3.6)	99 (3.9)	58 (2.3)	49 (1.9)	744 (29.2)
Average rainy days	6.8	5.2	6.1	7.1	16.1	20.2	22.6	21.6	20.9	16.0	9.0	9.3	160.9
Source: Meteoblue (modeled/calculated data, not measured locally)

== Demographics ==
Population census of Dingalan
Year	Pop.	±% p.a.
1960	3,368	—
1970	6,616	+6.98%
1975	7,591	+2.80%
1980	8,702	+2.77%
1990	14,475	+5.22%
1995	19,325	+5.56%
2000	20,157	+0.91%
2007	21,992	+1.21%
2010	23,554	+2.53%
2015	25,482	+1.51%
2020	27,878	+1.91%
2024	29,286	+1.19%
Source: Philippine Statistics Authority

In the 2024 census, Dingalan had a population of 29,286 people. The population density was 96 inhabitants per square kilometre (250/sq mi).

== Economy ==
Poverty incidence of Dingalan (%)

Source: Philippine Statistics Authority

== Education ==
The Dingalan Schools District Office governs all educational institutions within the municipality. It oversees the management and operations of all private and public, from primary to secondary schools.

=== Primary and elementary schools ===
- Abungan Elementary School
- Butas na Bato Elementary School
- Cabog Integrated School
- Caragsacan Elementary School
- Dikapanikian Elementary School
- Dingalan Central School
- Horseshoe Elementary School
- Ibona Elementary School
- Malamig Elementary School
- Matawe Elementary School
- Paltic Elementary School
- Singawan Elementary School
- Saint Patrick's Academy
- Tanawan Elementary School
- Umiray Elementary School

=== Secondary schools ===
- Dingalan National High School
- Ibona National High School
- Umiray National High School

=== Higher Educational Institution ===
- Dingalan Community College

=== Transportation ===
Dingalan can be reach via private vehicles or via bus up to Brgy. Umiray. Companies Dingalan Trans Express Inc. "formerly Danilo" (from Cabanatuan or PITX during peak seasons) and Baliwag Transit Inc. (from Cubao with daily trips via Maharlika Highway) are the 2 major bus companies that provide services going to Dingalan.

== Gallery ==
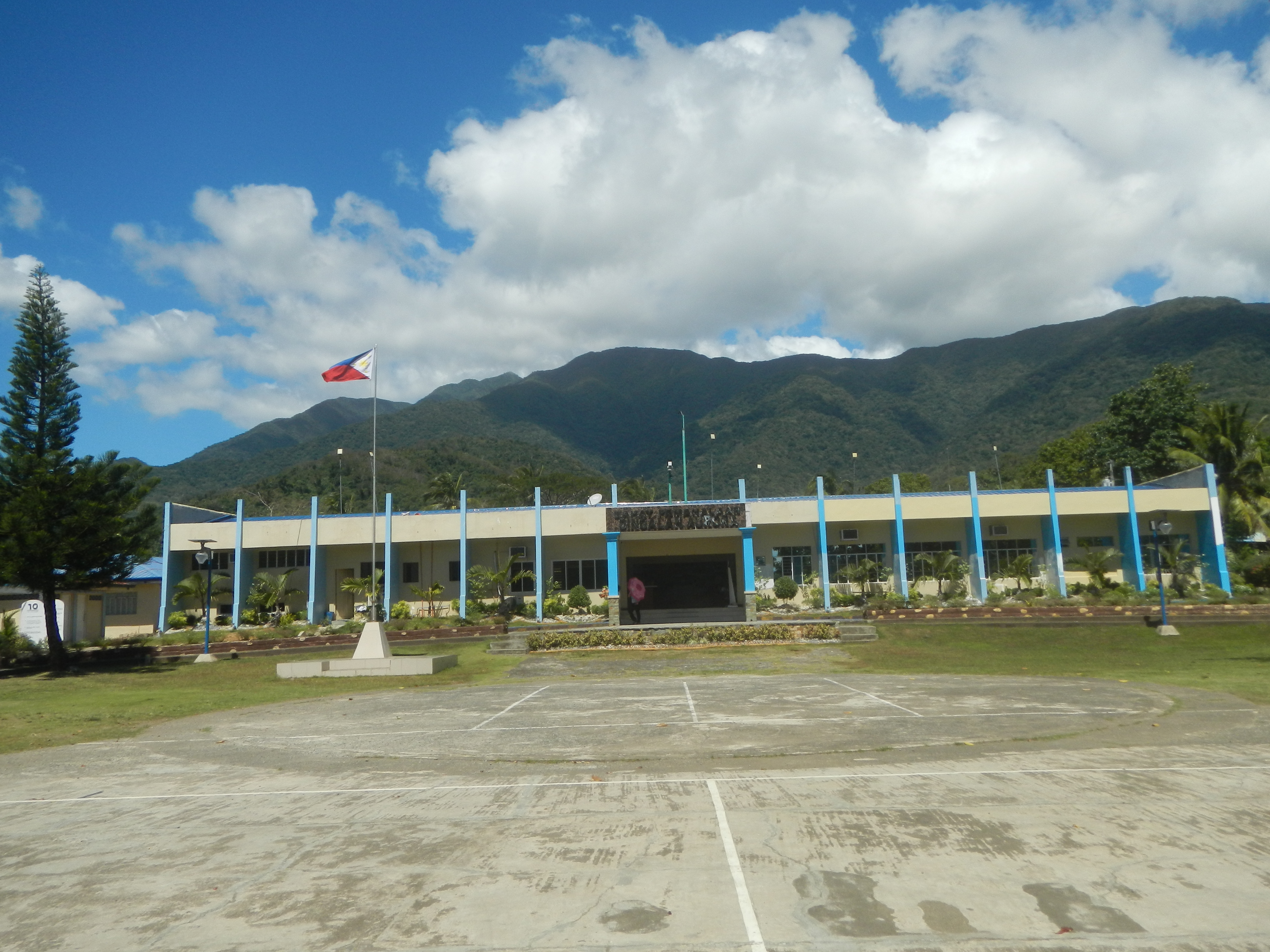
Town hall in Poblacion

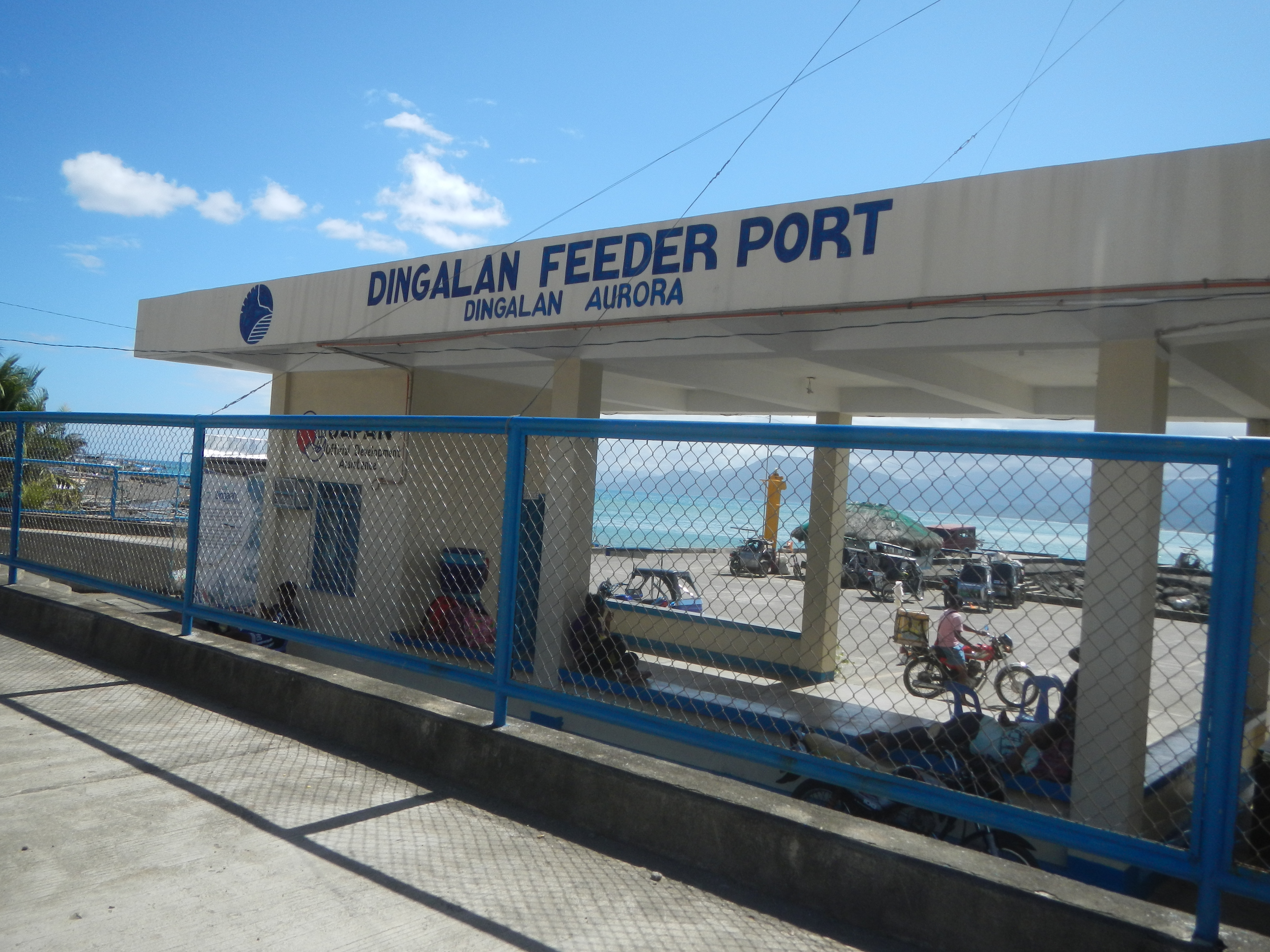
Dingaan Feeder Port

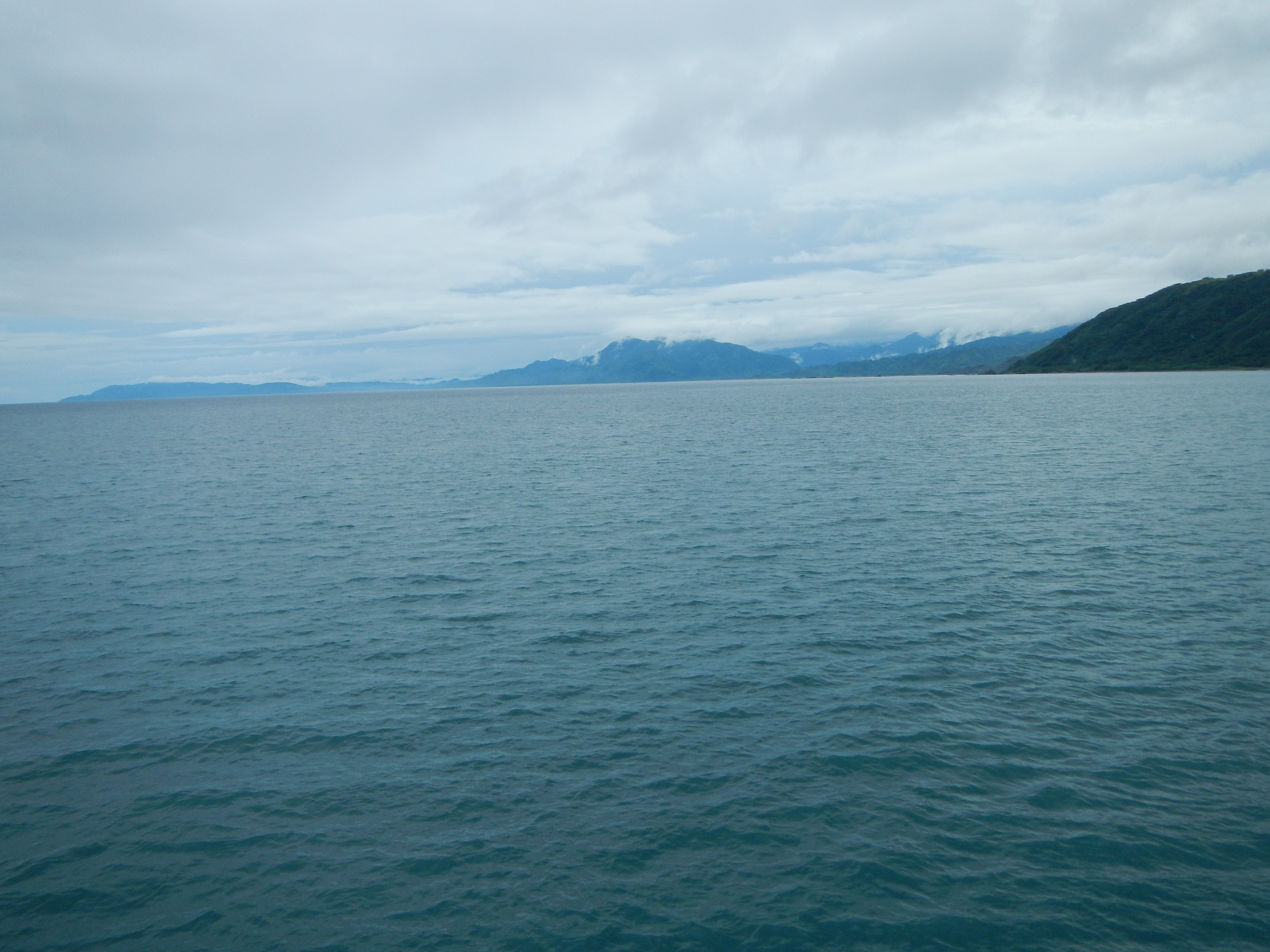
Dingalan Bay blue sea

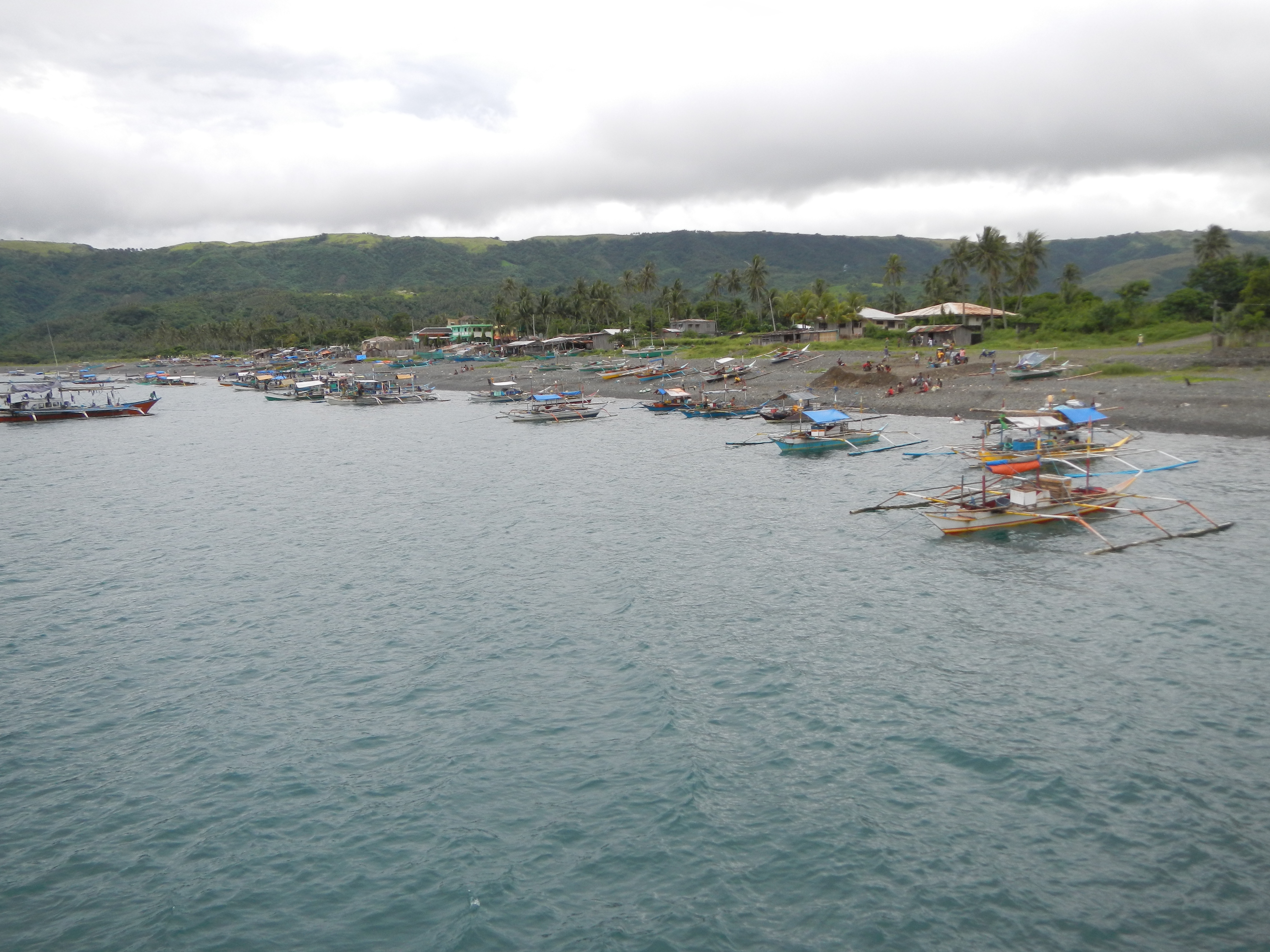
Fisherfolk at Aplaya
