= Angat Dam =

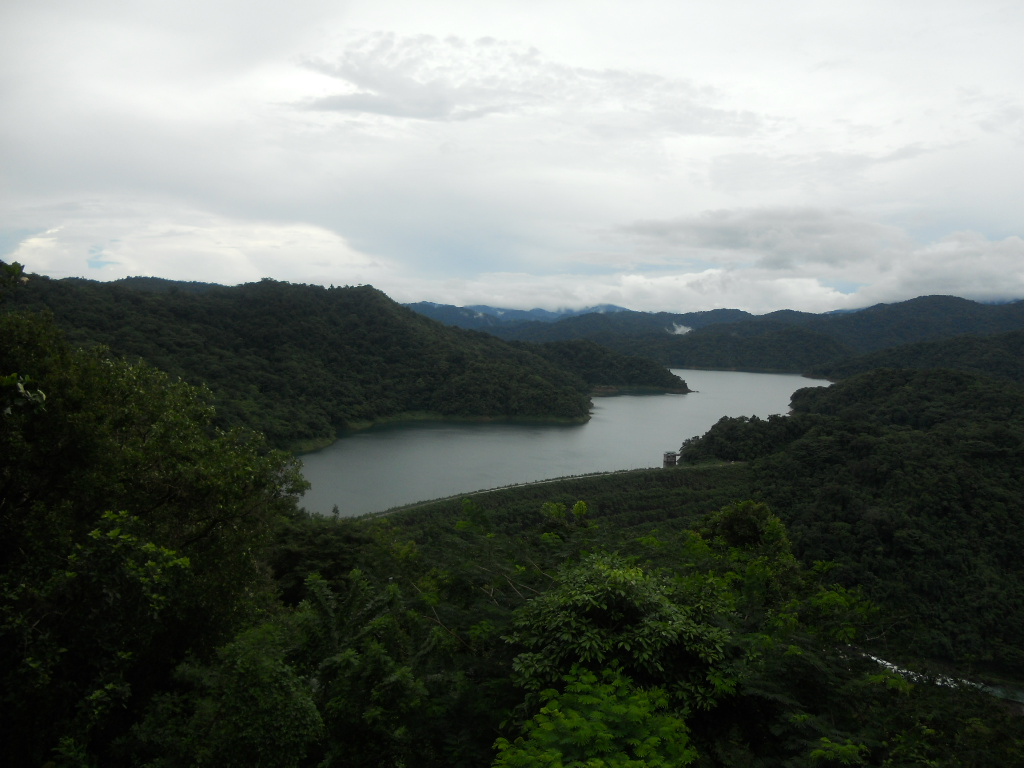
- View of Angat Dam from San Lorenzo (Hilltop), Norzagaray, Bulacan.

- Location in Bulacan Location in Luzon Location in the Philippines
- Official name: Angat Hydroelectric Dam
- Location: Barangay San Lorenzo, Norzagaray, Bulacan, Philippines
- Coordinates: 14°52′15″N 121°08′30″E
- Construction began: November 1961
- Opening date: October 16, 1967
- Construction cost: Php 315.344 Million
- Operator: National Power Corporation

Dam and spillways
- Impounds: Angat River
- Height: 131 m (430 ft)
- Length: 568 m (1,864 ft)
- Width (base): 550 m (1,800 ft)
- Spillways: 3

Reservoir
- Creates: Angat Reservoir
- Total capacity: 850×10^{6} m^{3} (30×10^{9} cu ft)

Power Station
- Turbines: 10 Vertical shaft, Francis turbine (Includes turbines from the main powerhouse and the auxiliary powerhouse)
- Installed capacity: 256,000 kW^^{1}

Angat Dam (Tagalog: [aŋˈɡat]) is a concrete water reservoir embankment hydroelectric dam in the Philippines that supplies Metro Manila and nearby provinces with water. It is a part of the Angat-Ipo-La Mesa water system. The reservoir supplies about 90 percent of raw water requirements for Metro Manila through the facilities of the Metropolitan Waterworks and Sewerage System and irrigates about 28,000 hectares of farmland in the provinces of Bulacan and Pampanga.

== Description ==
Angat Dam is located within the Angat Watershed Forest Reserve in Barangay San Lorenzo (Hilltop), Norzagaray, Bulacan. It supplies potable water to Metro Manila and powers a hydroelectric power plant. The dam is 131 meters high and impounds water from the Angat River that subsequently created the Angat Lake; the dam is located in Norzagaray as it was part of the town of Angat.

Angat Dam has a normal high water level of 210 meters, according to the Philippine Atmospheric, Geophysical and Astronomical Services Administration (PAGASA).

It has three gates opening a total of 1.5 meters to gradually release excess water collected during typhoons.

In comparison, Ipo Dam, located downstream of Angat Dam, has three gates and 100.8 meters as its normal high water level (NHWL). Ambuklao Dam on the other hand, has two gates with NHWL at 752 meters. Binga Dam, which sits downstream from Ambuklao, has three gates and NHWL at 575 meters. San Roque Dam, which was receiving water from Ambuklao and Binga, has NHWL at 280 meters.

Angat Dam supplies potable water and energy to Metro Manila and nearby areas. Tourists also visit the dam for fishing, boating and hunting.

In the early 1990s, the Philippine government and Metropolitan Waterworks and Sewerage System studied tapping the Umiray River basin in General Nakar, Quezon as an additional source for the Angat Dam Reservoir, as the growing population of Metro Manila pushed the demand for potable water up. This led to the Umiray-Angat Transbasin Project (UATP), which began in July 1995 and was completed in June 2000 with a total cost of ₱4 billion. The UATP involved constructing a 13 km 4.3 meter diameter diversion tunnel which channeled the headwaters of Umiray River at its intake point to Macua, Doña Remedios Trinidad, Bulacan, providing an additional 300 mld to the Angat Dam Reservoir.

As of 2010, Angat Dam was providing 4,000 million liters a day (mld) out of a demand of 4,395 mld, and that demand was expected to grow to 5.054 mld in 2015, and 4,680 mld in 2020. Successive administrations have already pushed for additional sources, such as the Laiban Dam, Kaliwa Dam, and Kanan Dam.

== History ==
=== Establishment ===
Rep. Rogaciano Mercado of Bulacan's second district expressed supported for the construction of Angat Dam (then called the Angat Multi-Purpose Project) in lieu of the Marikina Multi-Purpose Project proposed in Marikina Valley, which he argued was potentially hazardous due to geological defects in the area.

=== Super Typhoon Emma (Welming) ===
Emma hit Central Luzon in 1967, passing through the Angat Hydro-Electric Project and Dam of the National Power Corporation (NPC or Napocor) in Norzagaray. The heavy downpour caused the water in the dam reservoir to rise perilously to a danger height of 212 meters above sea level. Napocor opened the spillway gates to prevent an overflow of water from the dam.

Engineering Construction, Inc. (ECI), which had been doing construction work also in Norzagaray, suffered losses to its equipment and properties when the extraordinary large volume of water rushed out the spillway gates and hit ECI installations and construction works.

=== Super Typhoon Rita (Kading) ===
At about 2100 hours on October 26, 1978, during the height of typhoon "Kading", NAPOCOR simultaneously opened all three floodgates of the Angat Dam. The NPC started to open the floodgates from 1 meter to 8 meters at 0100 hours of October 27, 1978, until all floodgates were opened to the maximum of 14 to 14.5 meters by 0600 hours of the same day. This resulted in the inundation of several towns in Bulacan near the dam; the hardest-hit was Norzagaray, where about 100 residents died and million of pesos worth of properties were destroyed.

Eleven civil suits were filed against the electric corporation in the Regional Trial Court of Malolos. The NPC countered that there was very little opening of the spillways, ranging from 1 meter to 2 meters, but from midnight or from the first hours of October 27, 1978, the opening of all the three spillways started at 5 meters and swiftly went as far up as 14 meters. The court noted that had the opening of all the three spillways been made earlier and gradually, there would have been no need to open the same suddenly: "What made the situation worse was that the opening of the spillways was made at the unholy hours when residents were asleep. The plaintiffs all testified that they were never given any warning that the spillways would be opened to that extent."

== Notes ==
The sum of both installed capacity: The main powerhouse has 200,000 kW (4 X 50,000 kW) installed capacity while the auxiliary powerhouse has 46,000 kW (3 X 6,000 kW, 1 x 10,000 kW, 1 x 18,000 kW) installed capacity.

== See also ==
- Water supply and sanitation in the Philippines
- Energy in the Philippines
