= Umiray River =

River in Luzon, Philippines

- Umiray River mouth Umiray River (Philippines)

Location
- Country: Philippines
- Region: Central Luzon; Calabarzon
- Province: Aurora; Quezon
- City/municipality: Dingalan; General Nakar

Physical characteristics
- Mouth: Philippine Sea
  - coordinates: 15°13′02″N 121°25′09″E
- Length: 80.6 km (50.1 mi)
- Basin size: 610 square kilometres (240 sq mi)

The Umiray River is a river that separates the Aurora and Quezon provinces. It is bounded by the towns of Dingalan in Aurora and General Nakar in Quezon, it is ironically bounded by 2 barangays of the same name of each town, also Umiray.

It is used as a means of transport by the illegal loggers. From the mountains, the illegal loggers float the troso (lumber) and float them downstream up to the ocean. During the late 20th century (and continuing up to the present), it has been the site of several clashes between the army and the communist group, the New People's Army. In 1995, the government has made a project called Umiray–Angat Transbasin Project (UATP) to link the Pacific Ocean with Angat River in Bulacan's mountains through a tunnel that will traverse Umiray River then cut through the mountains of Sierra Madre straight to Angat River. In 2013, the Metropolitan Waterworks and Sewerage System signed an agreement with the General Nakar, Quezon local government unit to replace the structures made in 1995 to increase the flow from the Umiray to the Angat.
