= Largest projects in the Philippine economy =

The largest projects in the Philippine Economy includes both megaprojects, costing over $1 billion, and other large investment projects, typically costing between $10 million and $1 billion. Projects with investments below $10 million also may be included here, either as parts of larger projects, or in case of major international significance and media coverage. In case of projects involving new vehicle models, the cost of development is taken into account as well as the cost of production.

== Transportation ==
=== Air transport ===
Luzon

Region	Project Name / Description	Image	Status	Cost	Additional notes
Region II	Cagayan North International Airport		Completed	$34.2 million	
Region III	Clark International Airport Expansion		Completed	$1.7 billion	
Region III	Clark International Airport Hangar Facility Upgrade		Completed	$22 million	
Region III	New Manila International Airport (Bulacan Airport)		Under-construction	$15 billion	
NCR	Ninoy Aquino International Airport Terminal 1		Completed		
NCR	Ninoy Aquino International Airport Terminal 1 Renovation		Completed	$30 million	
NCR	Ninoy Aquino International Airport Terminal 2		Completed	$121 million	
NCR	Ninoy Aquino International Airport Terminal 3		Completed	$640 million	
Region V	Bicol International Airport		completed	$66 million	

Visayas

Region	Project Name / Description	Image	Status	Cost	Additional notes
Region VI	Iloilo International Airport		Completed	$201 million	
Region VII	Bohol–Panglao International Airport		Completed	$143 million	
Region VII	Mactan–Cebu International Airport Expansion		Completed	$600 million	
Region VIII	Panan-awan Airport		Completed	$10 million	

Mindanao

Region	Project Name / Description	Image	Status	Cost	Additional notes
Region XI	Francisco Bangoy International Airport Expansion		Under-construction	$780 million	
Region X	Laguindingan Airport Expansion		Under-construction	$280 million	

=== Land transport ===
Luzon

Region	Project Name / Description	Image	Status	Cost	Additional notes
Region IV-A	Calamba–Los Baños Expressway		Proposed	$131.1 million	
Region IV-A	Cavite–Laguna Expressway		Under-construction	$787 million	
NCR, Region IV-A	Laguna Lakeshore Expressway Dike		Proposed	$855 million	
NCR, Region IV-A	Marikina–Infanta Highway (Marcos Highway) Rehabilitation		Completed	$22 million	
NCR	Metro Manila Skybridge		Proposed	$225 million	
NCR	Metro Manila Skyway Stage 3		Completed	$395 million	
NCR	NAIA Expressway		Completed	$300 million	
Region III	North Luzon East Expressway		Proposed	$190 million	
NCR, Region III	North Luzon Expressway		Completed		
NCR	Parañaque Integrated Terminal Exchange		Completed	$43.2 million	Formerly known as the Southwest Integrated Transport System.
Region IV-A	Southern Tagalog Arterial Road		Completed	$57 million	
Region III	Subic–Clark–Tarlac Expressway		Completed	$700 million	
NCR	Taguig Integrated Terminal Exchange		Under-construction	$105 million	Formerly known as the South Integrated Transport System. Expected to be operational in 2028.
Region I, Region III	Tarlac–Pangasinan–La Union Expressway		Completed	$60 million	

Visayas

Region	Project Name / Description	Image	Status	Cost	Additional notes
Region VII	Cebu–Cordova Link Expressway		Completed	$600 million	
Region VIII	San Juanico Bridge		Completed	$22 million	

Mindanao

Region	Project Name / Description	Status	Cost	Additional notes
Region XI	Davao City Expressway	Proposed	$465 million	
Region X	Panguil Bay Bridge	Under construction	$94 million	

=== Rail transport ===
Luzon

Region	Project Name / Description	Image	Status	Cost	Additional notes
NCR	Manila Line 1		Completed	$200 million	
NCR, Region IV-A	Manila Line 1 South Extension Phase 1		Completed	$1.5 billion	
NCR	Manila Line 2		Completed	$568 million	
NCR, Region IV-A	Manila Line 2 East Extension Project		Completed	$225 million	
NCR	Manila Line 3		Completed	$655 million	
NCR	Manila Line 7		Under-construction	$1.45 billion	Expected to be operational by 2026.
NCR	Manila Line 9 (Metro Manila Subway)		Under-construction	$4.5 billion	Will partially be opened by 2028. Expected to be fully operational by 2029.
NCR	North Avenue Grand Central station		Under-construction	$54 million	
NCR, Region III, Region IV-A	North–South Commuter Railway		Under-construction	$14.8 billion	

Mindanao

Region	Project Name / Description	Image	Status	Cost	Additional notes
Region XI	Mindanao Railway System (Phase 1)		Proposed		

== Planned communities ==
Region	Project Name / Description	Image	Status	Cost	Additional notes
NCR	Arca South		Under construction	$1.5 billion	
NCR	Bay City Reclamation Project		Completed		
NCR	Capitol Commons		Under construction	$1.14 billion	
NCR	New Manila Bay–City of Pearl		Proposed		
Region III	New Clark City		Under construction	$59.288 billion	

== Public investments and infrastructure ==
=== Education ===
Region	Project Name / Description	Image	Status	Cost	Additional notes
Region I, III, IV-A	Public-Private Partnership for School Infrastructure Project		Under construction	$188 million	
Region I, II, III, IV-A, IV-B, V, VI, VII, VIII, IX, X, XI, XII, XIII, BARMM	Public-Private Partnership for School Infrastructure Project, Phase II		Under construction	$500 million	

=== Water infrastructure ===
Region	Project Name / Description	Image	Status	Cost	Additional notes
Region VI	Jalaur River Multi-Purpose Project, Stage II		Under construction	$213 million	
Region XII	Malitubog-Maridagao Irrigation Project		Under construction	$104 million	

- Philippine Arena; (2014) Cost: $214 million (done)
- The Gramercy Residences (2012); Cost: $120 million (done)
- SMX Convention Center (2007); Cost: $20 million (done)
- Centennial Tower (never constructed); Cost: $200 million
- Makati Parking Building; (2007) Cost: $52.8 million (done)
- Entertainment City Manila (2007); Cost: $15 billion (under construction)
- ELJ Communications Center (2000); Cost: $146.7 million (done)
- PBCom Tower (2000); Cost: $74 million (done)

== Power plants ==
- Philippine LNG Import Facility (2021); Cost: $2 billion (approved)
- Calatagan Solar Farm (2016); Cost: $120 million (done)
- Cadiz Solar Power Plant (2016); Cost: $200 million (done)
- Mariveles Coal-Fired Power Plant (2016); Cost: $1.2 billion (done)
- Bangui Wind Farm (2015); Cost: $54 million (done)
- Caparispisan Wind Farm (2015); Cost: $220 million (done)
- Mindoro Wind Farm (2014); Cost: $120 million (done)
- Burgos Windfarm (2014); Cost: $320 million (done)
- San Roque Dam (2003); Cost: $1.19 billion (done)
- Malampaya gas field (2001); Cost $4.5 billion (done)
- Bataan Nuclear Power Plant (1984); Cost: $2.3 billion; (completed but never fueled)
- Magat Dam (1982); Cost: $3.4 billion (done)
- Pantabangan Dam (1977); Cost: $20.74 million (done)
- Angat Dam (1967); Cost: $82 million (done)
- Ambuklao Dam (1956); Cost: $66 million (done)
