= Gezhouba (disambiguation) =

Gezhouba is a dam on the Yangtze River, in Yichang, Hubei, China.

Gezhouba may also refer to:

- Gezhouba Group, Chinese construction and engineering company
- Gezhouba International Plaza, skyscraper in Wuhan, Hubei, China
