= Kaifeng Thermal Power Station =

Coal-fired power station in Henan, China

Kaifeng Thermal Power Station 开封火电厂
- Country: China
- Location: Kaifeng, Henan
- Status: Operational
- Construction began: October 1969

Thermal power station
- Primary fuel: Coal

Kaifeng Thermal Power Station (Chinese: 开封火电厂), also spelled Kaifeng Thermal Power Plant, is a thermal power project located in Kaifeng, Henan. Its construction began in October 1969.

== History ==
The construction of the Kaifeng Thermal Power Plant began in October 1969, and the first phase of the project was installed with 2x50,000 kilowatt units, which were put into operation in 1973 and 1974. In April 1977, the power plant was expanded with two units of 125,000 kilowatts, which were put into operation in 1978, with a total installed capacity of 350,000 kilowatts.

On September 10, 2007, the construction of the expansion project of Kaifeng Thermal Power Plant started, and the project was constructed by Gezhouba Group. This project was newly built two 600MW supercritical units. In December 2008, its first unit passed the 168-hour full-load test running (168小时满负荷试运行). In March 2009, its second unit passed the 168-hour full-load test running and was put into operation.

With a total investment of 4.56 billion yuan, the Kaifeng Thermal Power Plant's 2×600MW unit expansion project is the largest investment project in Kaifeng after the founding of the People's Republic of China.
