= Kaytitinga Falls =

Coordinates: 14°06′26″N 120°49′45″E

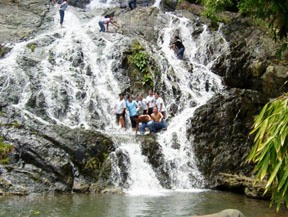
Kaytitinga Falls

Kaytitinga Falls is located in San Jose del Monte, Bulacan, Philippines. It can be reached via 1 hour trekking.

== Area profile and description ==
Kaytitinga Falls can be found in barangay of San Isidro. Kaytitinga falls consists of a three-level falls. Barangay San Isidro is located at the easternmost part of the city. It is a one-hour drive away from the municipal hall of the city. The forest wherein the kaytitinga falls is located is very vast and spacious and the beauty of the nature has been preserved. The forest is rich in biodiversity like different kinds of trees, plants and brooks. The way to Kaytitinga Falls is not well-developed that leads to non-accessibility of the trail. There are also no public toilets or showers in the area. Some indigenous people, the Dumagats, live in the place, a sign that the culture there is still preserved and they act as the protectors of their own natural habitat.

In 2017, Congresswoman Florida Robes introduced a bill to the Philippine House of Representatives for the falls to be declared as a protected area unde the National Integrated Protected Areas System (NIPAS).

== See also ==
- List of waterfalls
