= Metro Manila Dream Plan =

Philippine government infrastructure investment strategy

The Metro Manila Dream Plan, formally titled the Roadmap for Transport Infrastructure Development for Metro Manila and Its Surrounding Areas, refers to a 2014 integrated plan for improving the transport system in Metro Manila, Philippines, with the hope of turning it into a focal point for addressing Metro Manila's interlinked problems in the areas of transportation, land use, and environment.

The Metro Manila Dream Plan is a short- to long-term strategy (2016, 2020, and 2030 milestones) whose objective is to formulate a transportation infrastructure roadmap for the sustainable development of Metro Manila and its surrounding areas Regions III and IV-A (also known as "Mega Manila" or "Greater Metro Manila"). Under President Benigno Aquino III's leadership of the National Economic Development Authority (NEDA), the study was done from 2013 to 2014 with a grant from the Japan International Cooperation Agency (JICA) in cooperation with the Department of Transportation and Communication (DOTC), Department of Public Works & Highways (DPWH), Metro Manila Development Authority (MMDA), the private sector, and various organizations. The masterplan was approved by the president in September 2014.

A follow up study was published in 2019, under the “Follow Up Survey on Roadmap for Transport Infrastructure Development for Greater Capital Region".

== Strategies and goals ==
=== Problems to be addressed ===
The Dream Plan identified three interrelated problems development in Metro Manila would have to address:

- Traffic congestion,
- Land use, specifically the lack of affordable housing and the presence of slum/squatter areas, and
- Environmental risks to urban settlements in areas prone to natural disasters such as floods, earthquakes, typhoons, landslides, etc.

=== Core philosophies ===
The Dream Plan identifies three core philosophies, which it expresses as: sector integration; spatial integration; and institutional integration.

Sector integration refers to an approach that views various problematic aspects of Metro Manila's urban development as interrelated, and addressing them as such. The plan identifies critical sectors as traffic flow, settlement in hazardous areas, and overpopulation, and thus it seeks integrated approaches for "accommodat[ing] people in need of affordable housing free from hazard risks and traffic congestion."

Spatial integration refers to an approach that expands the search for solutions to Metro Manila's problems to integrate areas outside its current boundaries - looking towards creating new centers of urban growth and linking them efficiently, allowing for the management of population growth and urban expansion in a sustainable manner. Specifically, the Dream Plan seeks to create new growth areas in Central Luzon, with the new Clark Green City (now New Clark City) at its core, and Calabarzon, with the Batangas and Lucena port areas as core focal points.

Finally, institutional integration, refers to the need to strengthen and coordinate actions among local government units and regions.

=== Objectives, or "Five Nos" ===
The Dream Plan expresses its goals in terms of five key problems which it aims to definitively address, which it calls "5 Nos":

- No Traffic Congestion;
- No Households Living in Hazardous Conditions;
- No Barriers for Seamless Mobility;
- No Excessive Cost Burden for Low Income Groups; and
- No Air Pollution.

== Regional Integration Strategy ==
A significant philosophical approach of the Dream Plan is to redirect the Manila-centered spatial orientation of the metropolitan area and turn it into a network of carefully planned urban centers arranged on a north–south axis. This hopes to correct the current radial pattern of metropolitan development, which encourages settlement in the high flood-risk zones on the east and west and in the high quake-risk zones on the east of the present metropolis.

Specifically, this means

- Restricting further urban expansion in the Marikina Valley, defining the mountains of Rizal and the shore of Laguna de Bay as an eco-zone on the east side of the Greater Capital Region;
- Restricting further urban expansion along the northern and southern coasts of manila bay, retaining only the existing port area as a transportation hub, effectively making Manila bay another eco-zone, this time on the west side of the Greater Capital Region;
- Controlling urban expansion using careful planning of new urban centers to the south of Manila, with a hierarchical development strategy in mind.

All this would have to be connected via highly efficient transport backbones - envisioned by the dream plan as a "ladder form" structure, which would overlay high capacity expressway and railway networks over the existing radial-circumferential highway system of the current metropolitan area.

=== Greater Capital Region ===
This strategy expands the metropolitan area into what the plan refers to as a "Greater Capital Region" (GCR), which would incorporate the present National Capital Region (NCR), Region III (Central Luzon), and Region IV-A (Calabarzon).

=== Controlled creation of new urban centers ===
Instead of being centered solely on the City of Manila, the Dream Plan proposes that the new system move towards new centers of economic growth connected via an efficient high capacity high quality transport backbone. This would be defined by five growth center clusters: The existing Metro Manila cluster, a North Regional Growth Center based on gateway sea and airports in Region III, a South Regional Growth Center based on gateway seaports in Region IV-A, a two sub-regional growth centers to the immediate north and immediate south of the Manila cluster, respectively.

==== Metro Manila ====
The Metro Manila cluster would be formed by the existing NCR, plus nearby urban centers such as Antipolo, Bacoor, and Imus. Efforts in this particular cluster would focus on inner city redevelopment or revitalization, and the rehabilitation of disaster prone areas.

==== North Regional Growth Center (Subic-Clark-Tarlac) ====
The North Regional Growth Center cluster would be formed primarily by the Subic-Clark-Tarlac urban areas to the west, and then secondarily by urban centers of Cabanatuan and Gapan to the east.

Development in this cluster would be centered on the new Clark Green City, the gateway seaport at Subic, and Clark International Airport. Additional urban centers identified in this cluster include Tarlac City in Tarlac, San Fernando and Lubao in Pampanga, Cabanatuan and Gapan in Nueva Ecija.

==== South Regional Growth Center Region (Batangas and Lucena) ====
The South Regional Growth Center cluster would be formed by the urban centers of Batangas City and Lucena.

Development in this cluster would be centered on gateway seaports at Batangas and Lucena. Additional urban centers identified in this cluster include Lipa and Tanauan in Batangas, and Tayabas in Quezon.

==== North Sub-regional Growth Center (Bulacan) ====
The North Sub-regional Growth Center cluster would be formed by new urban development in Bulacan.

Development efforts in this area would be focused on planned urban expansion in the form of affordable housing for informal settlers. Malolos is projected to be the major urban core area in the Bulacan Sub-regional Growth Center, with other identified urban centers including Baliwag, San Jose del Monte, and Meycauayan.

==== South Sub-regional Growth Center (Cavite-Laguna) ====
The South Sub-regional Growth Center cluster would be formed by new urban development in Cavite, Laguna, and some parts of Batangas.

Development efforts in this area would be focused on planned urban expansion in the form of affordable housing for informal settlers. Calamba is projected to be the major urban core area in this sub-regional growth cluster, with other identified urban centers including San Pedro, Sta. Rosa, Biñan, Cabuyao, and San Pablo in Laguna, and Trece Martires and Tagaytay in Cavite.

=== Development of new gateway ports ===
==== Subic, Batangas, and Lucena Seaports ====
When the transport backbones are in place, the dream plan calls for the cargo-handling function of Metro Manila's ports to be shifted to Subic and Batangas, which would be achieved by limiting the future expansion of the existing Manila ports and then providing incentives for shipping companies to use the Subic and Batangas ports. The dream plan also calls for the expansion of the Lucena seaport, complementing the load of the Batangas seaport.

==== NAIA, Clark, and New NAIA Airports ====
The dream plan also proposes the development of two new gateway airports - one in Clark which would serve as a gateway airport for the central and northern cluster, and a "New NAIA" which would be based outside of the existing urban area.

Before this "New NAIA" is in place, it proposes the improvement of the existing NAIA and the utilization of the Sangley point Runway. It also suggests the improvement of Clark, which would serve as an alternative to NAIA.

Once the New NAIA is in place, it suggests that the current NAIA could be converted into a new central business district.

=== Reorienting Mega Manila's road network structure ===
Evolving from a plan first developed in the late 1970s, Metro Manila's transport system currently follows a radial-circumferential system, with the City of Manila at its center and with Circumferential Road 5 (C-5) and Circumferential Road 6 (C-6) at its outer boundaries. The Dream Plan takes the existing radial-circumferential system and proposes a ladder-form structure connecting the existing urban core with new urban centers along a north–south axis.

==== Existing Radial-Circumferential System ====
The plan calls for the rehabilitation of the existing radial-circumferential system, and the completion of links in that system which for different reasons have never been built. Connections in need of completion most notably include the Pasig River connections of C3 and the southern linkages of C5 towards Cavite and the South Skyway. Major renovations most notably include those on EDSA.

==== Connector expressways as a north-south transport backbone ====
The plan also calls for a transport backbone in the form of intra-city expressways that would connect NLEx with SLEx, decongesting traffic on non-toll highways in the existing metropolitan area by allowing north–south travel without having to pass through Manila streets, and by creating alternative routes for travelers who are willing to pay for faster flow of traffic. Also critical is the connection these expressways would create between the new gateway ports of the North and South Regional Growth centers proposed by the plan.

==== Suburban railways as a north-south transport backbone ====
The plan also calls for a transport backbone in the form of suburban railways, which would become the primary connector between Regional Growth Centers (Metro Manila, North, and South) and the Sub-Regional Growth Centers defined by peri-urban development north and south of Manila.

== 2030 Dream Plan Main Components ==
The plan is organized into five components: at-grade urban roads; main roads/expressways network; urban and suburban rail network; road-based public transport; and traffic management strengthening.

=== At-grade urban roads ===
The at-grade roads component of the dream plan calls for the systematic expansion of Manila's main roads network, including:

- The completion of missing links such as bridges or unfinished stretches of roads in the existing road networks, most notably the middle portion Circumferential Road 3 across the Pasig river, and the south portion Circumferential Road 5 connecting to the Metro Manila Skyway and to Cavite Coastal Road.
- The creation of 137 km of new roads,
- Flyovers,
- Sidewalks and pedestrian facilities, and
- the expansion of secondary roads in periurban areas.

=== Toll Expressways ===
The plan defines[5] highways as the "main roads" that facilitate travel within the metro for the majority of residents, and distinguishes them from "Expressways", which will charge a toll.

The plan intends for these toll expressways to decongest traffic on the main roads by providing an option to those road users willing to pay a toll fee in exchange for faster travel time.

The plan calls for the construction of 426 km of Intercity expressway, and 78 km of Urban expressway.

=== Urban/Suburban Rail ===
The plan calls for the expansion of Manila's urban and suburban rail network.

It proposes a 246 km main rail network consisting of 6 lines, and a 72 km secondary rail network made up of 5 lines.

Another important aspect of this component of the dream plan is integrated lines and improved accessibility.

Prominent projects under this component include:

- A North–South Commuter Rail from Malolos to Calamba
- A significant expansion of existing rail lines and construction of new ones like:
  - Line 1 Cavite (South) Extension (Niog)
  - Line 2 East and West Extensions (Masinag and Pier 4)
  - Line 4
  - Line 5 (BGC-Makati-MOA)
  - Line 6
  - Line 7
  - Metro Manila Subway

==== North-South Commuter Rail (Clark-Calamba) ====
The North-South Commuter Rail proposed by the dream plan will be a 180 km (110 mi) railway line with high capacity trains serving a route initially from Malolos City, Bulacan in Central Luzon to Calamba, Laguna, in Calabarzon. The Northern segment of the commuter rail is subdivided into two phases which are PNR Clark 1 or Tutuban-Malolos and PNR Clark 2 or Malolos-Clark.

The plan calls for the rail to have no level crossings at main roads, and for at-grade freight long-haul trains be developed beneath the elevated railway. It is expected that the creation of this rail line will promote urban growth along a north–south axis, further promoting the development of the North and South Regional Growth Centers.

==== Metro Manila Subway (Mindanao Avenue NLEX – FTI - NAIA) ====
The Metro Manila Subway proposed by the dream plan will be a 58 km subway which will serve as a second north–south mass transit backbone for the newly expanded Greater Capital Region.

Since its path hews close to much of EDSA, it is expected to dramatically improve mobility and accessibility along that critical route. It is also expected that the creation of this subway line will promote urban growth along a north–south axis, further promoting the development of the North and South Regional Growth Centers.

A preliminary study for the Metro Manila Subway was done during the course of the main Roadmap Study from 2013 to 2014, and the DPWH has announced that it expects to complete a master plan for the subway within 2015.

The 33-kilometer railway system's initial phase will encompass eight local government units in Metro Manila and traverse three central business districts.

=== Road-based public transport ===
The "road-based public transport" component of the dream plan concerns itself mostly with Buses and Jeepneys. It proposes:

- The modernization of the vehicles and the system by which they are operated,
- A rationalization of the public transport route structure, and
- Improved terminals and interchange facilities

=== Traffic management ===
The traffic management component of the dream plan calls for the modernization of:

- traffic engineering,
- traffic enforcement, and
- traffic education.

It also calls for the use of Intelligent Transport Services (ITS) such as Mobile navigation systems for commuters, Multi-story parking facilities, Park & Ride Facilities at rail stations, Community Use Bicycle Sharing, and so on.

== Short Term Program (2014–2016) ==
=== At-grade urban roads network ===
Projects under the short-term program (2014–2016) of the dream plan's at-grade urban roads component include highways and secondary urban roads. A number of the projects identified in the short-term program were actually already ongoing when the plan was approved by the NEDA, having already previously been identified as critical infrastructure projects.

==== Highways ====
Region	Project		Construction	Status	Operational	Ref.
NCR	Metro Manila Skybridge			Proposed		
NCR	EDSA Rehabilitation			Ongoing		
NCR	EDSA-Taft-Roxas Boulevard Flyover			Proposed		
NCR	Bonifacio Global City–Ortigas Center Link Road	Santa Monica–Lawton Bridge (Phase 1)	2018–21	Completed	June 12, 2021	
NCR	Bonifacio Global City–Ortigas Center Link Road	Lawton-BGC Viaduct (Phase 2A)	2018–21	Completed	September 30, 2021	
NCR	Skyway–C-5 link (Southeast Metro Manila Expressway/C-6 Phase 1, Section 1)			Proposed		
NCR	CAVITEX–C-5 Link		2016–26	Completed	March 30, 2026	
NCR	Metro Manila Interchange Project	EDSA-North Avenue-West Avenue-Mindanao Avenue Interchange		Proposed		
NCR	Metro Manila Interchange Project	Circumferential Road 5 (C-5)-Greenmeadows-Calle Industria-Eastwood Interchange		Proposed		
NCR	Metro Manila Interchange Project	EDSA-Roosevelt Avenue-Congressional Avenue Interchange		Proposed		
Region 3	Plaridel Bypass Road (Package 3 and 4)		2014–20	Completed	December 2020	

==== Other Roads ====
- Secondary Road Packages
- Preparatory Studies for Several Projects
- Other Central Luzon Road Projects (Ongoing)
- Other Southern Luzon Road Projects (Ongoing)

=== Toll Expressway Network ===
Projects under the short-term program (2014–2016) of the dream plan's expressways include:

Region	Project		Construction	Status	Operational	Ref.
Region 3	Central Luzon Link Expressway Phase I		2017–21	Completed	July 15, 2021	
NCR	NLEX Segment 8.2		2026	Under-construction		
NCR	NLEX-SLEX Connector Roads	NLEX Connector	2019–23	Completed	October 28, 2023	
NCR	NLEX-SLEX Connector Roads	NLEX Harbor Link (Segment 9 and 10)	2014–20	Completed	June 15, 2020	
NCR	NLEX-SLEX Connector Roads	Metro Manila Skyway Stage 3	2014–21	Completed	January 15, 2021	
NCR	NAIA Expressway Phase 2		2014–16	Completed	September 22, 2016	
Laguna de Bay	Laguna Lakeshore Expressway Dike			Proposed		
Region IV-A	Muntinlupa–Cavite Expressway		2012–15	Completed	July 24, 2015	
Region IV-A	Cavite–Laguna Expressway Stages 1 and 2		2017–25	Under-construction		
Region IV-A	Calamba–Los Baños Expressway			Proposed		
Region IV-A	Southern Tagalog Arterial Road (STAR) Tollway Redevelopment		2013–2015	Completed	2015	

=== Urban and suburban rail network ===
Project	Construction	Status	Operational	Ref.
LRT Line 1 Cavite Extension	2019–22	Completed	November 16, 2024 (Phase 1); 2030 (Phases 2 and 3)	
LRT Line 2 East Extension Project	2015–21	Completed	July 1, 2021	
LRT Line 2 West Extension Project	2025–	Proposed		
MRT Line 3 Capacity Expansion Project	2016–	Ongoing		
MRT Line 7	2017–27	Under-construction	2027	
Automated Fare Collection System	2015	Completed	December 16, 2015	
LRT Line 1 Rehabilitation	2011–26	Ongoing	2026	
LRT Line 2 Rehabilitation	2011–26	Ongoing	2026	
MRT Line 3 Rehabilitation	2019–22	Completed	March 2022	
North–South Commuter Railway	2019–28	Under-construction	2028	
Metro Manila Subway	2019–32	Under-construction	2032 (Phase 1)	

It also calls for a "Metro Manila Central Business District Transit System Study."

=== Road-based public transport network ===
Projects under the short-term program (2014–2016) of the dream plan's road-based public transport component include:

- Three Integrated Provincial Bus Terminals (IPBTs);
- Public Road Passenger Transport Reform Study;
- Bus Rapid Transit System 1; and
- Bus and Jeepney Modernization Programs

=== Traffic management strengthening ===
Specific aspects to be improved under the short-term program (2014–2016) of the dream plan's traffic management strengthening component include intersection capacity, traffic control centers, pedestrian crossings, intelligent parking, incident detection, signal control systems, travel time prediction, road maintenance schedule and monitoring, transport priority, bus schedule assistance.

The plan recommends a comprehensive traffic management study to cover these interconnected aspects of traffic management.

=== Action Plan for Gateway Seaports and Airports ===
The dream plan also includes a short term action plan for the development of seaports and airports, which includes:

- The implementation of already-committed improvement packages for NAIA and Clark;
- The placement of a cap for the expansion of Manila seaports;
- The creation of an incentives system for diverting port activities to Batangas and Subic seaports; and
- The conduct of studies for
  - the development of a "New NAIA" and
  - the redevelopment of the Manila Port Area

== JICA Study ==
The original study which came up with the dream plan was conducted by JICA at the request of the NEDA and was conducted from March 2013 to March 2014. Stakeholders consulted included the NEDA, the DPWH, the DOTC, the MMDA, and the Private Sector, among others.

== See also ==
- Transportation in Metro Manila
- Build! Build! Build! Program
