= Laguna Lakeshore Expressway Dike =

Road in the Philippines

- C-6 Extension

Route information
- Length: 43.6 km (27.1 mi)

Major junctions
- North end: Taguig, Metro Manila
- South end: Los Baños, Laguna

Location
- Country: Philippines
- Major cities: Taguig, Muntinlupa, San Pedro, Biñan, Santa Rosa, Cabuyao, Calamba
- Towns: Los Baños

Highway system
- Roads in the Philippines; Highways; Expressways; List

The Laguna Lakeshore Expressway Dike was proposed in the early 2010s as an expressway in the coastal area of Laguna de Bay in the Philippines, from Taguig in Metro Manila to Calamba and Los Baños in Laguna.

The project will involve the construction of a 47-kilometer-long (29 mi), six-lane dike including bridges, pumping stations and ancillary flood gates.

The project will also involve the reclamation of 700 hectares (1,700 acres) west of and abutting the expressway dike, separated from the shoreline by a 100-to-150-meter (330 to 490 ft) channel in Taguig and Muntinlupa.

The project aims to provide a high-standard highway that will speed up traffic between the southern part of Metro Manila and Laguna and a dike that would mitigate flooding in the western coastal communities along Laguna Lake.

The expressway will cost an estimated ₱36.74 billion (US$854.42 million). When constructed, it is expected to ease traffic congestion along the Muntinlupa and Calamba areas and to serve as a flood control measure for communities on the western shore of Laguna de Bay.

== Proposed route ==
The route alignment starts from Lower Bicutan, Taguig, connecting to the proposed C-6 Expressway Road Project. It traverses southwards, passing the city boundaries of Taguig and Muntinlupa in the southern part of Metro Manila, and continues further south, passing the cities of San Pedro, Biñan, Santa Rosa, Cabuyao, Calamba, and ends up at Los Baños in Laguna, near its boundary with Bay.

The expressway dike's construction is proposed to involve two sections: the first from Bicutan to Calamba and the second from Calamba to Los Baños.

The project details for the expressway dike as of October 2013 indicated plans for a 41.54-kilometer-long (25.81 mi), four-lane dike, but the official announcement of the approved project in June 2014 indicated that it would be 47 kilometers (29 mi) long, and have six-lanes.

== Proposed parallel eastern shore projects ==
While the expressway dike hopes to alleviate flooding on the southwestern shore of Laguna de Bay, officials and planners have acknowledged that there is still a need to cope with the excess water volume in the lake itself, with urban planner Felino Palafox describing the situation as "like having a toilet without a flush."

As the expressway dike would alleviate flooding in the more metropolitan western shore of the lake, similar projects have been proposed which would prevent the additional water volume from causing larger-scale flooding on the eastern shore, which includes the coastal towns of Rizal and eastern Laguna.

These projects include the construction of a "Pacific spillway" from the lake to the east coast of Luzon, which would drain excess water from the eastern part of the lake; and the construction of the revamped Laiban Dam and Kaliwa Low Dams in Tanay, Rizal, which is projected to reduce the water flowing into the northeastern portion of the lake.

However, the construction of the Pacific Spillway has been identified by the DPWH as a low priority, while the construction of the Tanay dams has been controversial, such that only the construction of the Kaliwa Low Dam has been approved as of the second quarter of 2014.

=== Pacific spillway proposal ===
The project most directly intended to prevent the water volume displaced by the expressway dike from causing larger-scale flooding on the lake's eastern shore is the construction of a 20-kilometer (12 mi) "Pacific spillway." This would take the form of either a tunnel or an open canal, which would begin at the eastern shore of Laguna de Bay, cross the Sierra Madre mountain range, and release water into the Pacific Ocean around the shore of Infanta.

In an August 23 interview with GMA News TV's News to Go, Laguna Lake Development Authority General Manager Nereus Acosta said that the government would be pursuing this project in place of the 1970s Parañaque spillway proposal, which had first been brought up in connection with the Manggahan Floodway project.

However, in a separate interview the day before, August 22, Public Works and Highways Secretary Rogelio Singson told abs-cbnnews.com that the construction of the Pacific spillway would be assigned the lowest priority because it may no longer be necessary if the controversial New Centennial Water Source-Kaliwa Dam Project (NCWSP) and its later full implementation to include Laiban Dam push through:

"'Yung mas priority doon iyong road-ring dike. 'Yung Pacific spillway e 'yun 'yung nasa last priority dahil 'pag nagawa na 'yung flood dam doon sa itaas ng Sierra Madre, ang tingin namin iyong tubig sa lawa e hindi ganung kasing taas ng nangyayari ngayon. So you might not need the Pacific spillway." (The road-ring dike is the higher priority. The Pacific spillway, that has least priority because when the flood dam up in the Sierra Madre [mountain range] gets finished, we don't think the water in the lake will go up as much as it used to. So you might not need the Pacific spillway.)

=== Kaliwa Low Dam and Laiban Dam proposals ===
The already-existing proposals for the construction of Laiban Dam and Kaliwa Low Dam in Tanay, Rizal have also been associated with the eastern shore aspect of the Laguna Lakeshore Expressway Dike, with Public Works and Highways Secretary Rogelio Singson indicating that these projects, if fully implemented, might reduce the need for the Pacific spillway project.

However, the construction of the dams has been controversial. Earlier attempts to construct a large dam in Tanay's Barangay Laiban have raised concerns among various stakeholders because of its potential environmental impact and because it would affect the ancestral lands of the Remontado Dumagat people.

Due to these controversies, a new proposal, the "New Centennial Water Source Project," was created, with two lower-capacity dams instead of the original large-capacity Laiban dam. The larger of the new proposed dams would retain the name "Laiban Dam," while a lower capacity dam downstream would be named the "Kaliwa Low Dam." Project costs and concerns about the larger dam further led to the project being split into stages. Today, only the lower-capacity Kaliwa Low Dam has been approved by the NEDA Investment Coordination Committee.

== Other related projects ==
=== Calamba-Los Baños Expressway ===
Aside from the Laguna Lakeshore Expressway Dike, another project, the Calamba-Los Baños Expressway, had earlier been proposed by the government, slated to begin construction sometime in "mid 2014–2017." Often confused with the Expressway Dike Project, the Calamba-Los Baños Expressway instead exits from the South Luzon Expressway at its Santo Tomas exit in Calamba, passing through the coastal areas of Calamba and Los Baños and ending in Bay, whereas the Dike project passes through reclaimed areas on the Laguna Lake itself.

== Approval process ==
=== August 2012: monsoon floods and initial conception ===
The idea of "a dike around Laguna" to serve as "a flood-control system meant to protect flood-prone areas along Laguna Lake" was first seriously raised in 2012, reacting to the damage wrought by the 2012 Metro Manila monsoon floods. The Department of Public Works and Highways (DPWH) was tasked to take on the project.

==== Early response from activist groups ====
Early opposition to the project, upon its suggestion in 2012, mostly focused on the displacement of fisherfolk from the shores of Laguna de Bay and on the fact that large corporations would benefit so much from the reclamation, with activist fisherfolk groups like PAMALAKAYA (the National Federation of Small Fisherfolk Organization in the Philippines) protesting the construction of "high-rise condominium buildings, big-budget housing units, world-class hotels and ecotourism centers in areas which will be vacated by the lake-shore families."

PAMALAKAYA also expressed skepticism regarding the intent of the project, saying they had doubts such a project would solve flooding in Metro Manila and low-lying areas around the lake or provide a major water catchbasin catering to the business needs of water and electric utilities.

=== August 2013: Typhoon Maring and public announcement of "road-ring dike" ===
In the aftermath of the floods brought about by Typhoon Trami (Maring) in August 2013, President Benigno Aquino III made plans for the dike project public.

Media outlets referred to the proposal as a "megadike," but Public Works Secretary Rogelio Singson corrected this, saying it would be called a "road-ring dike." Singson also said they did not have a timeline for the project yet, as they were still completing the feasibility study and coming up with a detailed project design.

There was some controversy about whether the dike had been a government priority before the 2013 floods. The government had released the Flood Management Master Plan for Metro Manila and Surrounding Areas in June of that year, and the announcement had not included the dike as one of the "11 recommended shortlisted structural mitigation measures," listing it merely as an "optimum solution in solving the flooding situation in the Laguna lake-shore area."

==== Proposed project financing ====
President Aquino also said in the vernacular that "the best part [of the road dike project] is that it can be self-financing," explaining that the dike may be financed through reclamation:

"Ang proposal nung proponent is dahil may mare-reclaim nga ang bayad sa kanila something like a third of the reclaimed area mababayaran na yung combination dike and road that will open up a lot of areas around Laguna leading to development." (The proposal of the propinent is that since there is reclamation to be done, the payment to them could just be something like a third of the reclaimed area. That would pay for the combination dike and road that will open up a lot of areas around Laguna leading to development.)

In an interview the following day, Nereus Acosta announced in another interview that the project fell under Public-Private-Partnership program for the C-6 Extension, while in another interview, Public Works Secretary Rogelio Singson said the dike could be built under a "built-operate-transfer" scheme, meaning that the project would be financed and operated by a private agency for a period not exceeding 50 years, after which it would be taken over by the government.

=== May 2014: rejection due to environmental impact questions ===
The Expressway Dike Project was initially slated for approval by the National Economic and Development Authority (NEDA) in its May 29, 2014, Board meeting, with the inter-agency Investment Coordination Committee of the National Economic and Development Authority (NEDA-ICC) endorsing the project for final approval by the board.

It was initially rejected at that meeting, however, when some of the board members had questions about some of the environmental and technical aspects of the project.

The DPWH later announced that it would make the "necessary clarification" regarding the project's environmental impact, specifying that concerns raised in the meeting had included "the height of the dike, the construction of water circulation, the separation between the low-lying communities and the new islands that would be created as part of the reclamation, the establishment of pumping stations, among others." The department indicated that they hoped to get final approval for the project and be able to bid the project out "toward the end of 2014 or in the first quarter of 2015."

=== June 2014: approval ===
In June 2014, the Expressway Dike Project was finally green-lighted for implementation.

The NEDA board deferred on the project again during their June 2, 2014 meeting, requesting the DPWH to prepare and submit materials to be presented at the June 19 meeting, specifying the DPWH's responses to specific questions raised by the NEDA board.

The project was finally approved during the June 19, 2014 board meeting, in which the board also approved the operation and maintenance of the Bohol Airport and Laguindingan Airport in Misamis Oriental. At ₱123 billion, this made the Expressway Dike the biggest PPP project under the administration of President Aquino.

Public-Private Partnership Center Cosette Canilao told Reuters that the auction process "will start within the next quarter."

Construction of the expressway dike was slated to begin in "late 2015" and finish in 2021.

On July 28, 2014, President Aquino cited the expressway dike in his 5th State of the Nation Address as one of the infrastructure projects approved by his administration as part of its disaster preparedness efforts.

== Bidding process ==
Cosette Canilao, Public-Private Partnership (PPP) Center executive director, identified the 14 companies that bought bid documents as of August 18, 2014:

- Metro Pacific Investments Corp,
- Ayala Land Inc,
- San Miguel Corp,
- Megaworld Corp,
- Filinvest Land Inc;
- GT Capital Holdings Inc (Metrobank),
- LT (Lucio Tan) Group Inc,
- Leighton Contractors (Philippines),
- Egis Group,
- Minerales Industrias Corp, and
- Muhibbah Engineering (M) Bhd,
- Minerales Industrias Corp,
- JP Power and Wealth Corp,
- Macquarie Capital Securities, and
- Laguna Lakeshore Consortium (with D.M. Wenceslao and Associates, Inc.’s Delfin J. Wenceslao as chairman);

== See also ==
- Laguna de Bay
- Major roads in Metro Manila
- Highways in the Philippines
- List of expressways in the Philippines
- Metro Manila Dream Plan
- South Luzon Expressway
- Calamba-Los Baños Expressway
- Laguna Lake Development Authority
- Kaliwa Low Dam
- Proposed dams in the Kaliwa River watershed
