= Proposed dams in the Kaliwa River watershed =

Proposed by the Philippine Government since the 1970s

Several bulk water supply projects on the upper portion of the Kaliwa River Watershed have been proposed by the government of the Philippines since the 1970s, with the intent of relieving Metro Manila of over-dependence on water supplied by Angat Dam. Most of these have focused on a particular site in Barangay Laiban in Tanay, Rizal, on the upper portion of the Kaliwa River Watershed to which the Laiban Dam belongs, and the projects have thus often been referred to as Laiban Dam or Kaliwa Dam, although multiple projects have been referred to using either name.

Due to controversies regarding the project's environmental impact and its potential effect on local communities, notably including a community of the indigenous Remontado Dumagat people who consider the area part of their ancestral lands, these projects have proved controversial and have thus been variously approved, deferred, cancelled, and reapproved by the government at different times.

== Proposed dam sites ==
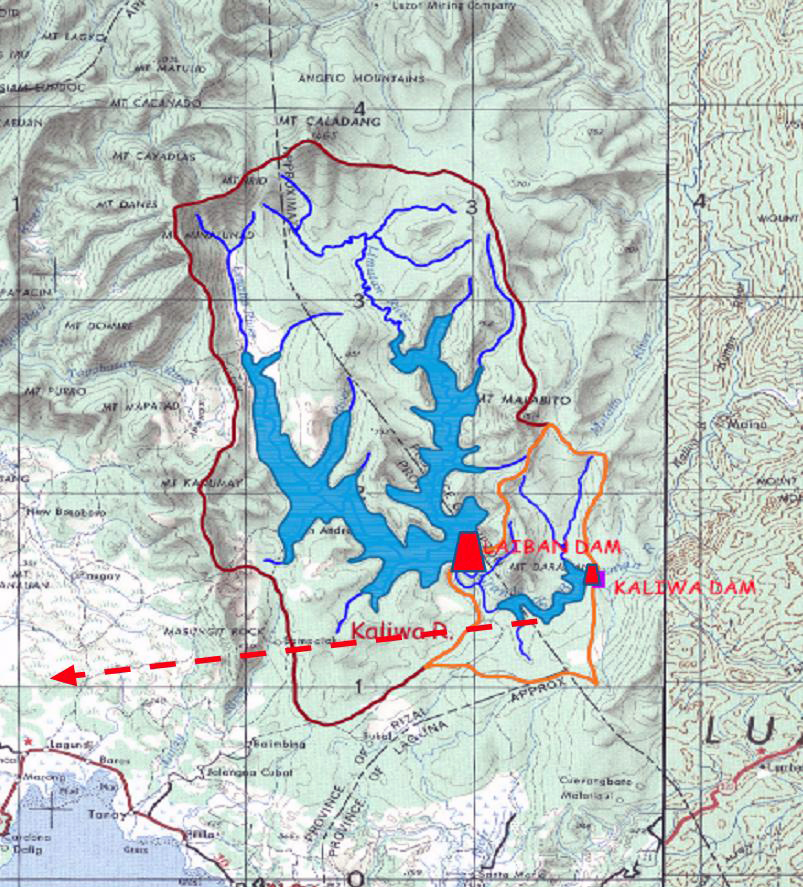
Toppgraphic Map of Laiban and Kaliwa Dam Watershed.

Dams have been proposed on two separate locations within the Kaliwa River watershed: one upstream in Tanay, Rizal, which is sometimes called the "Laiban Dam", and another Downstream, in Quezon Province. Both have been referred to as the Kaliwa Dam, but since 2012, the Quezon site is the one distinguished as "Kaliwa Dam" when the two sites are both being discussed.

=== The Kaliwa Watershed ===
The Kaliwa Watershed forms part of the Sierra Madre Biodiversity Corridor (SMBC), and has been identified by the Southern Sierra Madre Wildlife Center of the Environmental Studies Institute of Miriam College as one of the SMBC's 14 priority biodiversity conservation sites. It is described as "an important wildlife habitat that contains dipterocarp trees, a wide array of birds, mammals, amphibians and reptiles, some of which are threatened and endemic species."

In 1999 the Kaliwa Watershed, evaluated at the time as "degraded due to anthropogenic pressures", was classified as a protected area under the National Integrated Protected Areas System.

The terrain is generally mountainous, surrounded by slopes > 50%, consisting partly of forested hills and partly of cultivated land, with some slash and burn cultivation (kaingin) areas present. Its elevation is from 220 masl (meters above sea level) to 1,530 masl. A number of small creeks run through the lower slopes, all eventually connecting to the main river.

=== The Laiban sub-watershed site in Tanay, Rizal ===
The Laiban site where the project is supposed to be built is a Barangay of municipality of Tanay in the province of Rizal, east of Metro Manila. It contains he 180 ha Laiban sub-watershed, a microbasin of the bigger Kaliwa Watershed, nestled in the southeastern portion of the Sierra Madre Mountain Range.

Barangays on the site also serve as home to the Indigenous Remontado Dumagats.

=== Downstream site in Quezon Province ===
The other proposed site for the dam and reservoir is further east and downstream on the east-flowing Kaliwa river, located in the Barangays of Pagsanjan in the town of General Nakar and Magsaysay in the town of Infanta. Proposals for the construction of this downstream dam still involves the placement of conveyance tunnels and reservoir areas in the upstream Tanay, Rizal site.

== Previously discontinued proposals ==
=== Manila Water Supply III project during the Marcos administration ===
The history of projects on the Kaliwa River watershed began with the conception of the Manila Water Supply III project in November 1979 during the administration of President Ferdinand Marcos. However, instructed the MWSS to look for alternative sites. The MWSS identified the Kaliwa River basin to be the most viable alternative, and began the first World Bank feasibility study on the damming of the Kaliwa river in 1979.

During that time, however, the Philippine economy had gone into rapid decline because Marcos' debt driven deficit spending made the Philippines vulnerable when the United States increased its interest rates in the third quarter of 1981. The ensuing collapse of the Philippine economy, worsened by the political pressure after the assassination of Benigno Aquino, led to slow development of the Laiban dam project until Marcos was forced out of office and into exile by the 1986 People Power Revolution.

By 1989, the succeeding administration of Corazon Aquino reviewed the project and determined that costs had ballooned so high that the project had to be shelved.

=== Proposals during the Ramos and Arroyo administrations ===
After the administration of President Fidel Ramos took over in 1992, it continued conducting studies for the development of a Kaliwa dam, but these remained just proposals as the Metropolitan Waterworks and Sewerage System was privatized, and concessionaires Manila Water and Maynilad took over the servicing of water in the National Capital Region.

In 2007, the administration of Gloria Macapagal Arroyo was able to get funding for Laiban Dam approved. However, the ZTE broadband scandal forced the project to be shelved.

=== 2009 San Miguel Corporation proposal ===
In 2009, San Miguel Corporation submitted an unsolicited proposal for the building of a dam in Laiban, but public opinion at the thought of higher water rates led to the project once again being shelved in 2010.

=== 2009 Kaliwa Intake Weir proposal ===
Also in 2009, Osaka-based Japanese company Global Utility Development Corporation submitted an unsolicited proposal for what was called the Kaliwa Intake Weir Project, which would have seen the creation of a 7-meter, 550 MLD Weir at the Kaliwa site, instead of a dam. At the instructions of President Aquino, this proposal was explored again in 2017, after the approval of the New Centennial Water Source-Kaliwa Dam Project by NEDA

=== 2012 Kaliwa Low Dam proposal ===
The New Centennial Water Source-Kaliwa Dam Project was a water project proposed by the Philippine Government in 2012, whose main component was the construction of the Kaliwa Low Dam in Tanay, Rizal, as well as a water supply tunnel, and the attendant infrastructure for these structures. The proposed Kaliwa Low Dam design had a 600 million-liters-a-day (MLD) capacity, and the water supply tunnel has a 2,400-MLD capacity. Had it been built, the Kaliwa Low Dam was expected to ease the demand on the Angat Dam, Manila's sole water storage facility.

In 2015, two consortia were pre-qualified to bid for the undertaking of the Kaliwa Dam project — the SMC-K Water Consortium, which is a partnership between San Miguel Holdings Corp. and Korea Water Resources Corp.; and the Abeima-Datem Consortium, which is a partnership between Albeinsa Infraestructura Medio Ambiento S.A and Datem Inc.

When the project had not moved forward by the time Aquino administration ended, the succeeding Duterte administration decided not to pursue the Kaliwa Low Dam plan. The administration pursued a bigger dam instead, with funds to be obtained through an official development assistance from China.

=== 2012 Laiban Low Dam proposal (NCWSP Phase 2) ===
A second dam further upstream, named Laiban dam, was also proposed under the 2012 version of the NCWS-Kaliwa Dam Project, as part of a larger, integrated system. The proposed system was intended to be built in stages, with the approval of Laiban Dam subject to the success of the Kaliwa Low Dam. As a result, only stage one, involving Kaliwa Low Dam its attendant the water supply tunnel, were actually approved for construction during the administration of Benigno Aquino III. The dam would not be included in the new NCWS plan under the succeeding administration.

== Ongoing MWSS-CEEC dam project ==
A new proposal under the administration of President Rodrigo Duterte, would replace the 2012 proposal with a full-sized dam, which would be negotiated using bilateral agreements. However, the project would continue to use the name "New Centennial Water Source-Kaliwa Dam Project."

Various environmental and indigenous peoples groups and have voiced concerns regarding the project, with some alleging that the government bypassed various social and environmental regulations to complete the dam within the current administration. Proponents of the dam state that the project would bring various security and tourism benefits, while alleviating the water shortage in Metro Manila.

In a report to the United Nations Human Rights Council, Dumagat-Remontado communities said that 10,000 people are "adversely affected" by the project. Dumagat-Remontado groups said that the project violates their ancestral domain rights and puts natural resources and biodiversity at risk. Deforestation caused by the project will also reduce the Sierra Madre Mountain Range's ability to mitigate climate change, they said.

The dam was originally proposed to be built at the Laiban Dam site in Tanay, Rizal, but was later disapproved because a dam in Tanay would submerge a larger area. The site downstream in Quezon Province was approved instead, with the areas in Tanay and Teresa becoming sites for the upstream reservoir and conveyance tunnels instead.

=== Construction ===
The tunnel boring machines for the dam were revealed on June 2, 2021. The project had its groundbreaking on June 29, 2021. Excavation works for the dam is scheduled to begin in December 2021, to be done by a joint venture of MWSS and China Energy Engineering Corporation (CEEC).

== See also ==
- Water supply and sanitation in the Philippines
- Energy in the Philippines
- Angat Dam
- Wawa Dam
- Chico River Dam Project
