= Kaliwa Low Dam =

Dam project in the Philippines

Kaliwa Dam
- Interactive map of Kaliwa Dam
- Official name: New Centennial Water Source – Kaliwa Dam Project
- Location: General Nakar and Infanta, Quezon, Philippines
- Coordinates: 14°48′56″N 121°28′38″E
- Construction began: 2019
- Opening date: 2030 (expected)
- Construction cost: ₱12.2 billion
- Operator: Metropolitan Waterworks and Sewerage System (MWSS)

Dam and spillways
- Impounds: Kaliwa River

Reservoir
- Creates: Kaliwa Reservoir
- Total capacity: 57×10^{6} m^{3} (2.0×10^{9} cu ft)

The Kaliwa Low Dam, proposed by the Philippine Government in 2012, was one of several bulk water supply projects on the upper portion of the Kaliwa River Watershed that have been proposed but ultimately shelved by the Philippine Government since the 1970s.

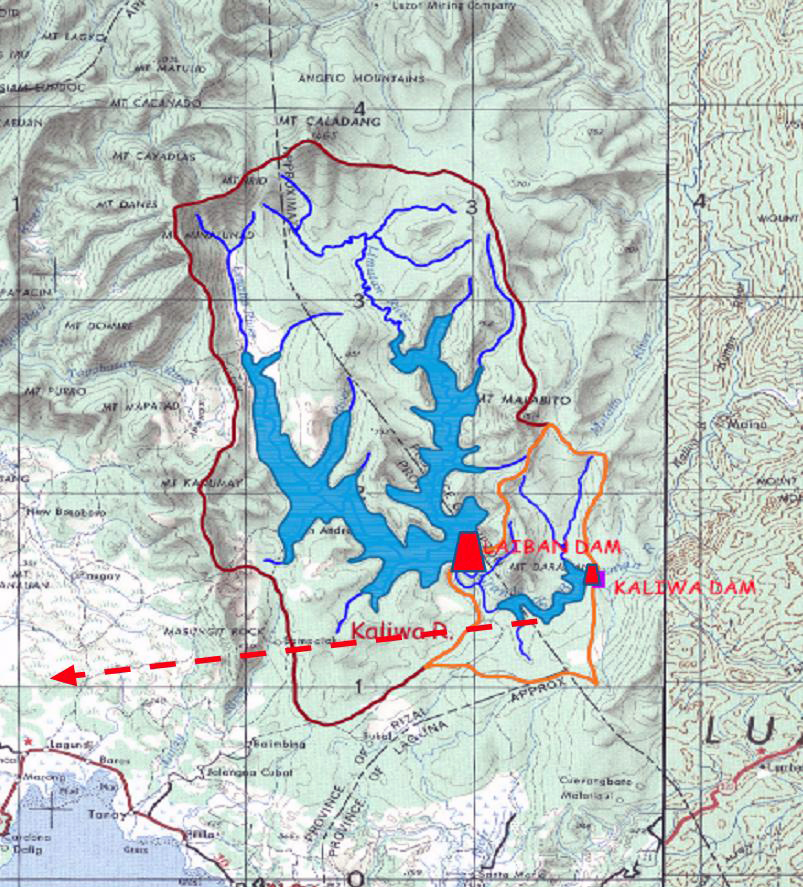
Toppgraphic Map of Laiban and Kaliwa Dam Watershed.

The proposed Kaliwa Low Dam design had a 600 million-liters-a-day (MLD) capacity, and the water supply tunnel has a 2,400-MLD capacity. Had it been built, the Kaliwa Low Dam was expected to ease the demand on the Angat Dam, Manila's sole water storage facility. It was the main component of the New Centennial Water Source-Kaliwa Dam Project in Tanay, Rizal, which also called for the construction of a water supply tunnel and various attendant infrastructure.

The project had originally been proposed as a bigger, integrated system that included a plan for a second dam, named Laiban dam further upstream. But the government decided on a proposal that would have built the system in stages, and only stage one, involving Kaliwa Low Dam and the water supply tunnel, was approved under the administration of Benigno Aquino III. When the project did not move forward by the time the Aquino administration ended, the succeeding Duterte administration decided not to pursue the Japanese-proposed Kaliwa Low Dam plan in 2019, deciding to instead pursue a bigger, China-funded dam project.

== Earlier projects at the Laiban Watershed ==
Various plans for the construction of a dam in Tanay, Rizal, have been proposed since the 1970s, when the Marcos government first decided that the location was a more viable location for a dam than the Marikina River. However, protests against the construction of the dam, called Laiban because Barangay Laiban was chosen as the exact project site, very quickly led to protests from various groups. Foremost among these were Indigenous peoples from Central and Southern Luzon, notably the local Remontado Dumagat people, whose ancestral lands would specifically be affected. Environmental and activist groups later also raised concerns. As a result, construction of the dam has been approved, deferred, stopped, and restarted a number of times in the decades since.

== Project approval process ==
=== Original proposal, including Laiban Dam and Power Plant ===
The roots of the current "New Centennial Water Source Project" can be traced to the Water Security Legacy (WSL) Roadmap proposed by the Metropolitan Waterworks and Sewerage System (MWSS) in 2012–2016. Based on this document, the MWSS developed plans for "the development of a dam at the Kaliwa River (Laiban Dam), and/or a smaller dam downstream (Kaliwa Low Dam) to maximize water supply, ensure short - and long - term redundancy, and optimize power generation capacities," and in February 2013, the Public Private Partnership Center released a document "sounding out" interested parties.

In that initial market sounding, this proposal was already thought likely to comprise:

1. ) Laiban Dam and/or Kaliwa Low Dam;
2. ) Head works and its appurtenant facilities;
3. ) Conveyance structure from the diversion point to the water treatment facility(s);
4. ) Water treatment facility(s); and
5. ) Hydropower facility(s).

In a report by Philippine Daily Inquirer reporter Niña Calleja in that same month, MWSS senior deputy administrator Nathaniel Santos indicated that the main difference between the NCWSP from previous plans was that it would involve the construction of two smaller dams at the Kaliwa watershed instead of just the one. A main dam (Laiban Dam) would be built at the upper Kaliwa River in Barangay Laiban, and another regulating dam (Kaliwa Low Dam) further downstream.

When the National Economic and Development Authority (NEDA) Investment Coordination Committee (ICC) had their October 4, 2013, Joint Cabinet Committee and Technical Board Meeting, however, they suggested that the MWSS to develop the project in stages, allowing for construction on the Kaliwa Low Dam to begin sooner, and for the Laiban Dam components of the project to be funded under a different financial mechanism.

=== Project financing ===
The original integrated project had been proposed by the MWSS under a build-operate-transfer (BOT) financing scheme. When the Joint Cabinet Committee and Technical Board Meeting of the National Economic and Development Authority (NEDA) Investment Coordination Committee (ICC) discussed the project on 4 October 2013, however, they recommended that the MWSS resubmit its proposal with only the Kaliwa Low Dam and water supply tunnel components, and that it be funded using the MWSS' funds or though overseas development assistance.

=== Approval of Kaliwa Low Dam proposal ===
The project, with its revised scope, was approved at the May 29, 2014, meeting of the NEDA Board, which is chaired by President Benigno Aquino III.

On July 28, 2014, President Aquino cited Kaliwa dam in his 5th State of the Nation Address as one of the infrastructure projects approved by his administration as part of its drought prevention efforts.

In 2015, two consortia were pre-qualified to bid for the undertaking of the Kaliwa Dam project — the SMC-K Water Consortium, which is a partnership between San Miguel Corporation and Korea Water Resources Corporation; and the Abeima-Datem Consortium, which is a partnership between Albeinsa Infraestructura Medio Ambiento S.A and Datem Inc.

=== Government shift to Chinese proposal ===
On November 20, 2018, the MWSS signed a US$211.21 million preferential buyer's credit loan agreement with the Export-Import Bank of China (China Eximbank) to finance 85% of the total cost for the project. The commercial engineering, procurement, and construction (EPC) contract was awarded to the China Energy Engineering Corporation (CEEC).

The terms of the agreement include a 2.0% annual interest rate, a 20-year maturity period, and a 7-year grace period. In December 2022, the Supreme Court of the Philippines declared the loan agreement constitutional and valid, dismissing petitions challenging its procurement and terms.

In 2019, under the administration of President Rodrigo Duterte, the government revealed that it would not continue with the project under a public–private partnership agreement as proposed during the Aquino administration, but would instead pursue the project using Official Development Assistance loan from China.

Some lawyers noted that the interest rate of the Chinese deal was 2%, while the Japanese deal that was sidelined by the government only had a 1.25% interest. The Japanese have since renewed their call for the Philippine government to reconsider their proposal.

The MWSS targets completing the Kaliwa Dam project by 2028, following the schedule authorized by the Economy and Development Council. As of late 2025, overall progress stood at 26%, with the agency continuing to assess its execution timeline. It was pushed back until 2030 after Chinese loan financial termination and resolved construction delays affecting the multibillion-peso water infrastructure project.

== Social and environmental concerns ==
=== Social issues ===
Ancestral lands belonging to Indigenous Dumagats and Remontados will be affected by the Kaliwa Dam project. The coalition Sectors Opposed to the Kaliwa Dam (STOP Kaliwa Dam) estimate that 1,000 households from Barangay Daraitan in Tanay, Rizal, and 500 households in Pagsangahan, General Nakar, Quezon, will be inundated by the construction. The Samahan ng mga Katutubong Agta/Dumagat (Organization of Indigenous Agta/Dumagat) estimate that the project would displace 10,000 members of the Dumagat tribe. Protesters have maintained that Indigenous communities that will be affected by the project were not consulted. Philippine law requires that such projects acquire free, prior, and informed consent (FPIC) from Indigenous communities.

=== Environmental issues ===
Sierra Madre is one of the most biodiverse areas in the Philippines and the largest remaining rainforest in the country. An estimated 12,147 hectares of residual forests, home to 172 recorded plant or flora species will be affected by the dam construction.

The project site is part of the Kaliwa Watershed Forest Reserve, which is supposedly protected by virtue of Proclamation No. 573 on June 22, 1968. Proclamation 1636 declared a portion of the area a National Park and Wildlife Sanctuary.

Environmental groups have protested the project, as the dam will destroy a great portion of the Sierra Madre range. The dam will ultimately destroy numerous habitats of many endangered species living in the mountains once construction begins. Among the thousands of plant and animal life whose home will be destroyed by the project is the critically endangered Philippine eagle. Other species that will be affected by the project are the endangered north Philippine hawk-eagle, the Philippine brown deer, the Philippine warty pig, and the vulnerable northern rufous hornbill.

== See also ==
- Proposed Dams in the Kaliwa River watershed
- Manila Water Supply III project
- Angat Dam
- Wawa Dam
- Chico River Dam Project
- Metropolitan Waterworks and Sewerage System
