= Gezhouba International Plaza 1 =

Coordinates: 30°36′34″N 114°15′19″E

Paradise Walk Wuhan Jiangchen Tower 1
- 葛洲坝国际广场; Gézhōubà Guójì Guǎngchǎng
- Interactive map of the Paradise Walk Wuhan Jiangchen Tower 1 area

General information
- Status: Complete
- Type: Office
- Location: Wuhan, Hubei, China
- Construction started: 2018
- Estimated completion: 2022

Height
- Antenna spire: 223.5 metres (733 ft)

Technical details
- Floor count: 50

The Paradise Walk Wuhan Jiangchen Tower 1 (simplified Chinese: 葛洲坝国际广场; traditional Chinese: 葛洲壩國際廣場; pinyin: Gézhōubà Guójì Guǎngchǎng) is an office skyscraper in Wuhan, Hubei, China. The tower was built between 2018 and 2022 and stands at 223.5 metres (733 ft) tall with 50 floors.
