= China Energy Engineering Corporation =

Chinese state-owned energy conglomerate

China Energy Engineering Corporation (Energy China)
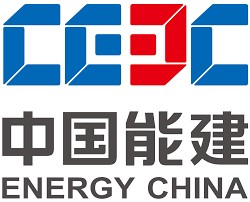
- Company type: State-owned
- Traded as: SEHK: 3996
- Industry: Energy
- Founded: September 29, 2011; 14 years ago
- Headquarters: Chaoyang District, Beijing, China
- Area served: Worldwide
- Key people: Wang Jianping (汪建平) (Chairman)
- Services: Survey, design and consultancy, construction and contracting, equipment manufacturing, civil explosives and cement production, investment, etc.
- Revenue: 226,066,820,000 renminbi (2018)
- Number of employees: 160,000+
- Subsidiaries: China Gezhouba Group Corporation
- Website: en.ceec.net.cn

China Energy Engineering Corporation or Energy China (CEEC, Chinese: 中国能源建设), is a Chinese state-owned energy conglomerate, with headquarters in Chaoyang District, Beijing.

== History ==
The conglomerate was established on September 29, 2011, with the approval of the State Council of China. It is under direct supervision of the State-owned Assets Supervision and Administration Commission (SASAC). Its major group companies include the China Gezhouba Group Corporation (CGGC), China Power Engineering Consulting Group Corporation (CPECC), Electric Power Planning & Engineering Institute (EPPEI), China Energy Equipment Co., Ltd., the Engineering Department (14 design & survey institutes in 14 provinces, municipalities and autonomous regions), and the Construction Department (22 construction enterprises in 15 provinces, municipalities and autonomous regions).

In November 2015, the company announced its IPO on the Hong Kong Stock Exchange. In 2021, the company was also listed on the Shanghai Stock Exchange.

In the years that followed, the company expanded rapidly overseas and participated in energy and infrastructure projects in Asia, Africa, the Middle East, and Europe. Many of these projects are linked to China's Belt and Road Initiative.

== Activities and Structure ==
The company is involved in numerous projects in the fields of fossil fuels, hydropower, nuclear energy, and renewable energy. The group operates in over 140 countries worldwide and is listed among the Fortune Global 500 companies. The projects it has completed range from, for example, coal-fired power plants in Bangladesh, to solar power plants in Greece and Morocco, hydroelectric power plants in Argentina, offshore wind farms in Vietnam, and desalination plants in Qatar. The company is also involved in several projects not directly related to the energy sector (e.g., roads and industrial facilities).

The company is divided into six main subsidiaries within a complex holding structure. In total, the company comprises more than 20 sub-units.

== Shareholders ==
The company's shares are traded on the Hong Kong Stock Exchange and the Shanghai Stock Exchange. The main shareholder is the Chinese central government, through state-owned holding companies:

- State-owned Assets Supervision and Administration Commission (23.62%)
- State Administration of Foreign Exchange (15.79%)
- E Fund Management Co., Ltd. (4.5%)
