= Dumagat people =

Dumagat
Agta
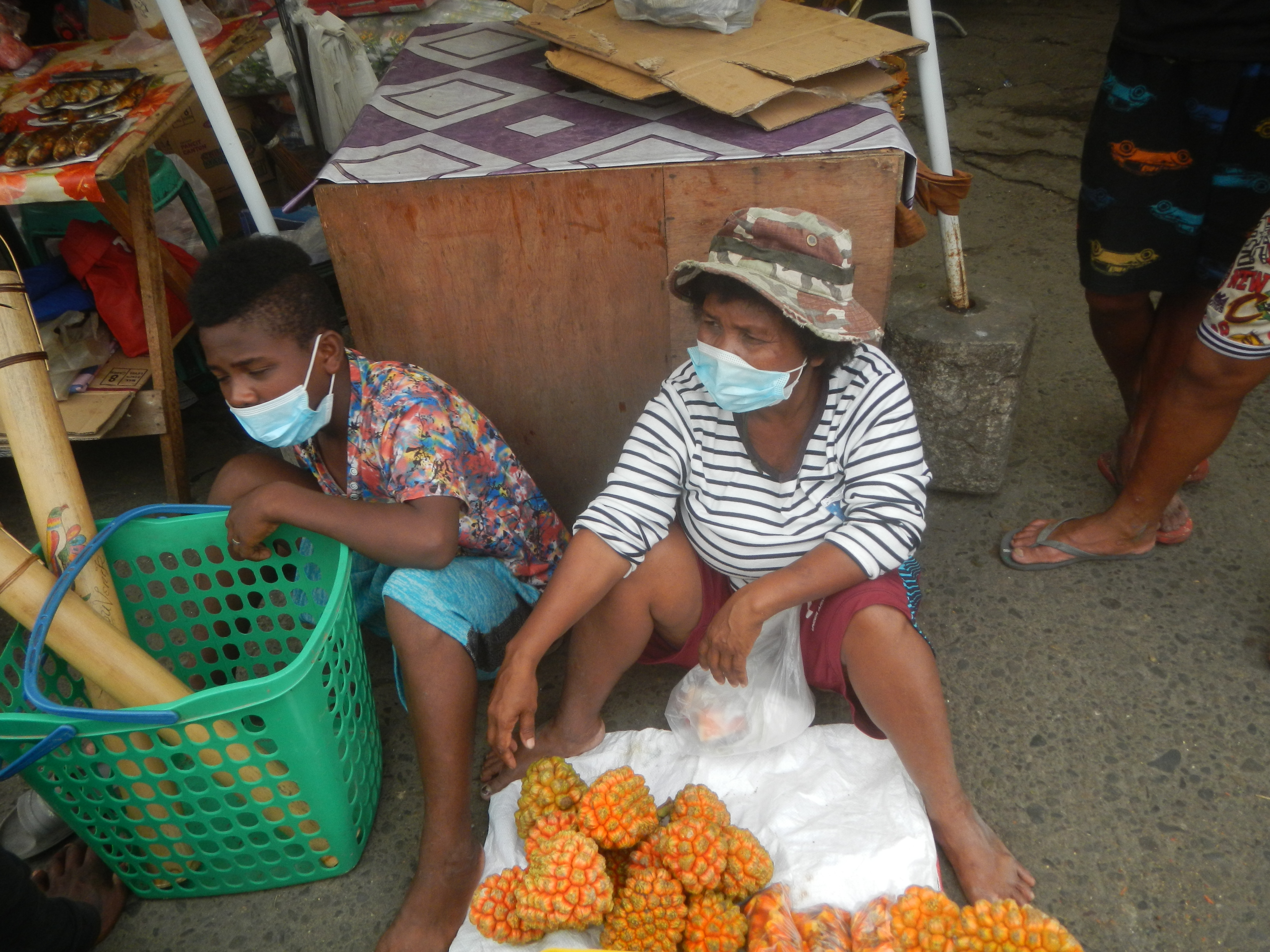
- Dumagats selling goods at a public market in Baliwag, Bulacan

Total population
- Est. 5,000 to 6,000

Regions with significant populations
- Luzon, Philippines

Languages
- Casiguran Dumagat Agta, Hatang-Kayi, Tagalog

Religion
- Christianity, folk religions

Related ethnic groups
- Other Negrito people, Filipino people

The Dumagat people (also spelled Dumaget), sometimes collectively referred to as the Dumagat–Remontados or just simply Remontados, are an indigenous subgroup of the Negrito peoples in the Philippines. The name "Dumagat" is an exonym given by lowland Tagalog speakers, literally meaning "from the sea," though it is used as an endonym by some Negrito communities along the Umiray River and surrounding areas. Many communities refer to themselves as Agta, meaning "human" in their native language.

They inhabit both upland and coastal areas along the Sierra Madre mountain range and nearby provinces, including Aurora, Quezon, Rizal, Bulacan, and Nueva Ecija. Traditionally, they practice semi-nomadic subsistence through hunting, fishing, swidden agriculture (or locally known as kaingin), farming, and forest gathering. Despite pressures from development, logging, and mining, the Dumagat continue to assert their cultural identity and ancestral domain rights under the Indigenous Peoples' Rights Act of 1997 (IPRA).

== Classification and terminology ==
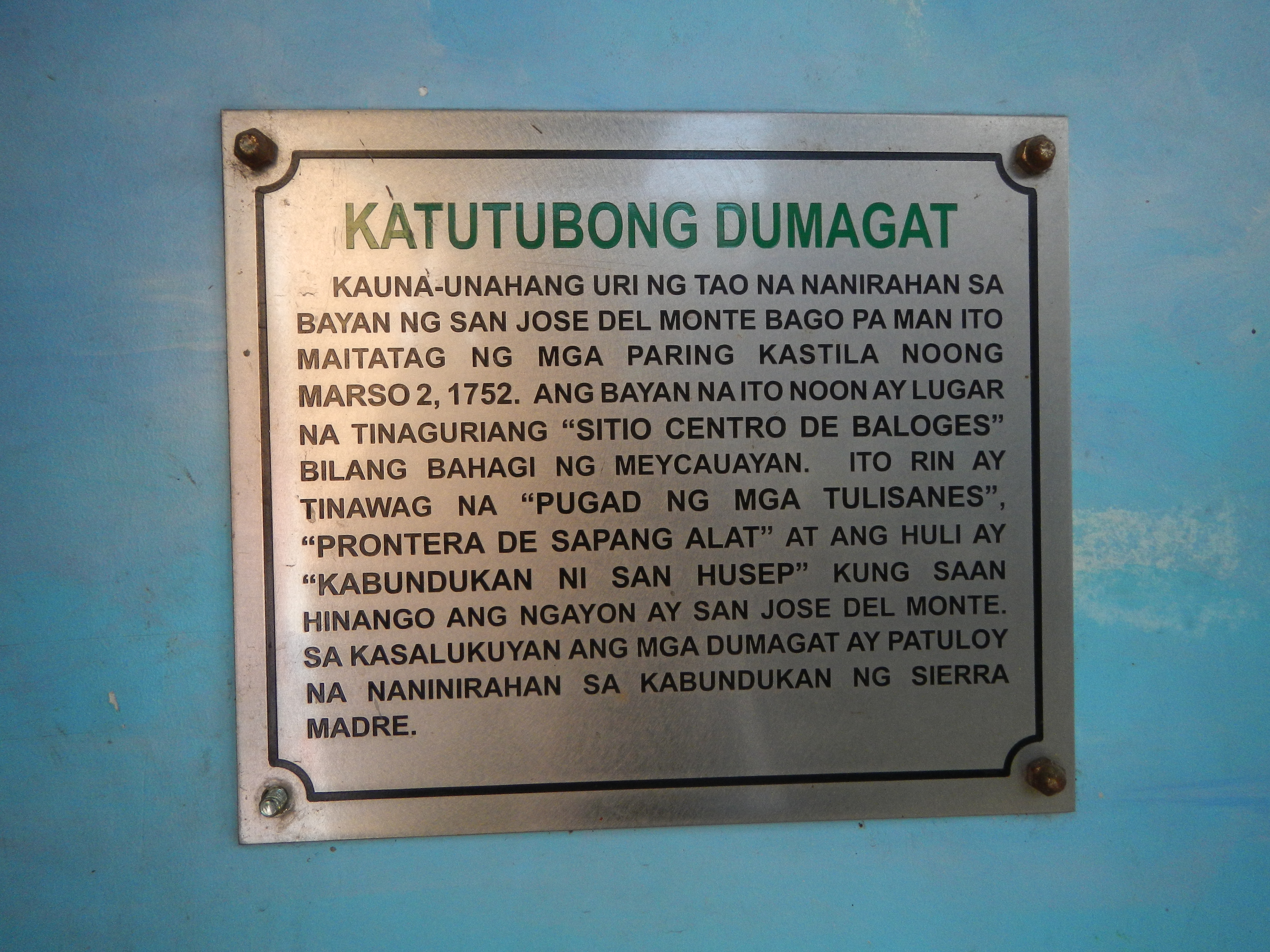
A historical marker written in Tagalog in San Jose Del Monte, Bulacan, saying that the Dumagat people already inhabited the area even before the Spaniard priests established the town.

The Dumagat people, also known as Agta, are an indigenous Negrito group in the Philippines. They are generally classified as a subgroup of the Aeta peoples, who are regarded as among the earliest inhabitants of the archipelago.

Some Dumagat communities are also referred to as Remontado, derived from the Spanish remontar ("to go back to the mountains"), a term used during the colonial period for lowlanders who retreated to the uplands to escape Spanish authority. According to the National Commission for Culture and the Arts (NCCA), the Remontados of the Sierra Madre are thought to have originated from lowland populations who moved to the mountains to escape Spanish rule. Over time, these upland settlers intermarried with neighboring Negrito groups, leading to kinship connections between communities. In certain contexts, the combined designation Dumagat–Remontado is used to refer to these populations.

The term Dumagat is an exonym, and its origin has been interpreted in several ways. It may derive from gubat ("forest") and hubad ("naked"), but a more plausible derivation is taga-dagat ("those who live by the sea") or "sea gypsies". The term is widely believed to relate to the Tagalog word dagat ("sea"), thus, Dumagat meaning "sea people" or "those from the coast". The term Dumagat is used as an endonym only among Negrito groups along the Umiray River and nearby areas of Quezon and Aurora.

In other regions, Dumagat groups identify themselves as Agta, meaning "human" in their own language. In some Agta communities, the term Dumagat carries negative connotations due to its past association with "bandits" and "thieves," leading some to reject the label. Some communities also prefer more localized identifiers such as taga-bundok (from the mountains) or magkakaingin (those who practice kaingin or slash-and-burn agriculture).

== Geographic distribution ==
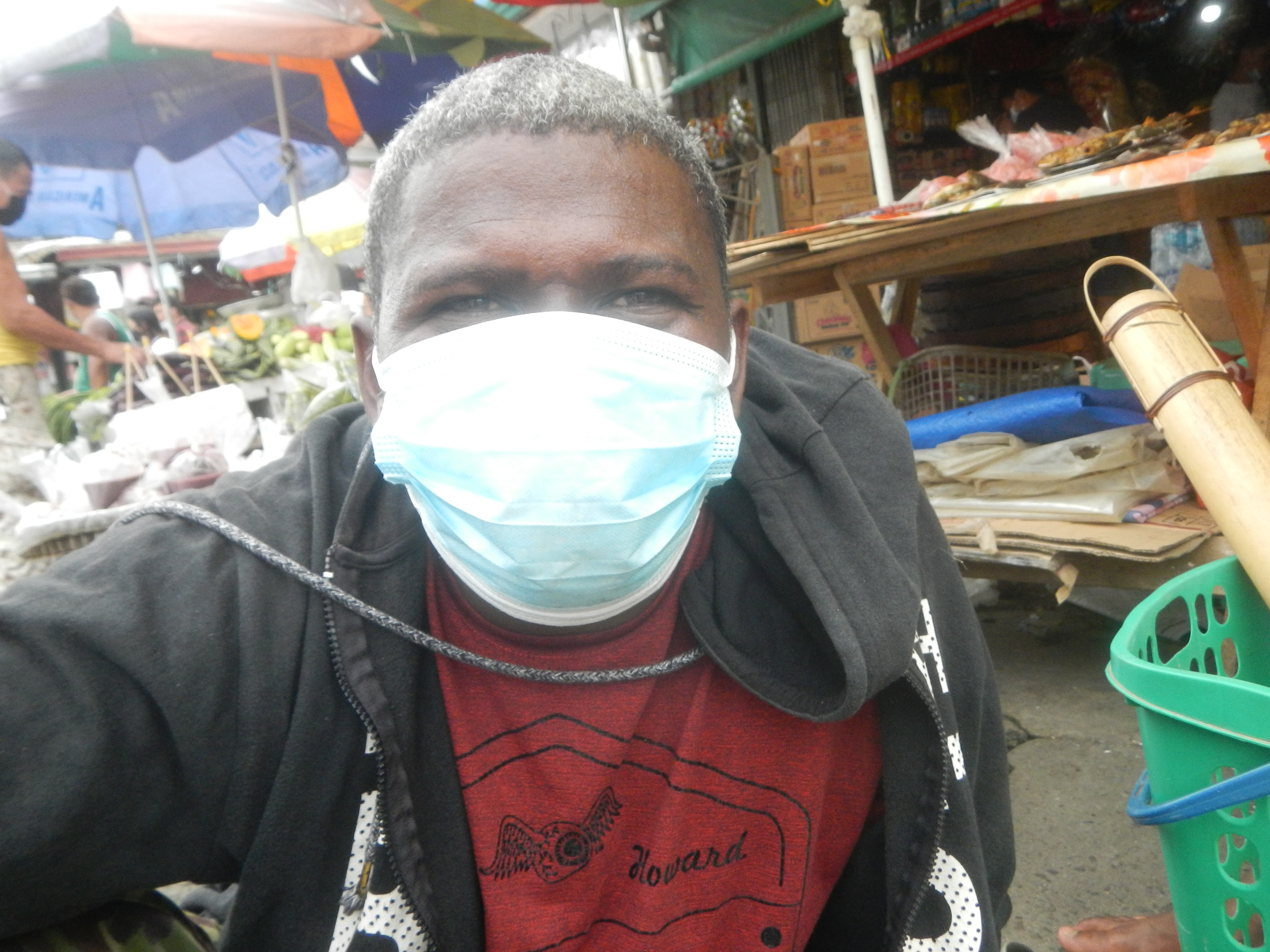
A Dumagat man at a public market in Baliwag, Bulacan.

Dumagat communities are primarily found along the eastern slopes of the Sierra Madre mountain range, which runs through the provinces of Quezon, Aurora, Rizal, Bulacan, and Nueva Ecija. Other settlements exist in parts of Laguna, Quirino, and Isabela, occupying both upland and coastal zones. These communities tend to be small and scattered, often located near river systems and forest clearings that support subsistence activities.

According to the NCCA, the Remontado population in eastern Rizal was recorded at 2,650 in 1936, increasing only slightly to 2,750 after 45 years, indicating a nearly stationary growth rate compared to the quintuple increase of the province's non-Remontado population in the same period. The Joshua Project estimates that the Agta Umiray population, closely associated with Dumagat groups in Aurora and Quezon, numbers about 5,200 individuals, while the Casiguran Dumagat Agta in northern Aurora accounts for approximately 900 individuals.

== Culture ==
=== Language ===
Dumagat–Remontado communities speak a range of languages: some speak Casiguran Dumagat Agta (a Northeastern Luzon Agta language), others speak Remontado / Hatang-Kayi (a distinct Central Luzon language), and many are bilingual in Tagalog. The Katig Collective at the University of the Philippines notes that Hatang Kayi was once spoken across large areas of the Sierra Madre but has sharply declined in recent decades. The number of speakers dropped from about 2,530 in 2000 to roughly 325 in 2018, indicating severe language endangerment. The Joshua Project estimates around 3,900 speakers of Dumagat–Remontado languages in total, including Casiguran Dumagat Agta and related dialects.

Although most Dumagat–Remontado people are now bilingual or multilingual in Tagalog and other regional languages, they preserve their native language in part through the Dumagat school.

=== Subsistence ===
Dumagat communities traditionally rely on a mix of hunting, fishing, forest gathering, swidden (kaingin) agriculture, and communal farming. Tools like bows and arrows, traps, and nets are used in hunting; fishing is often done in rivers and coastal areas. Forest resources such as roots, honey, and medicinal plants are gathered; leaves and kitchen scraps may be used in composting or small-scale soil improvement. Some fields are farmed communally, with shared labor and land use among families. The Dumagat–Remontado of General Nakar traditionally cultivate small kaingin plots near their clan settlements. However, as lowland migrants have occupied many fallow areas, some communities have been forced to move their farms farther upland and closer to forest margins.

In recent years, younger Dumagat members have taken up modern livelihood strategies including selling vegetables, ride-hailing, tour guiding, and occasionally working in informal or illegal jobs, as extractive industries and land pressures limit traditional agricultural options.

=== Society ===
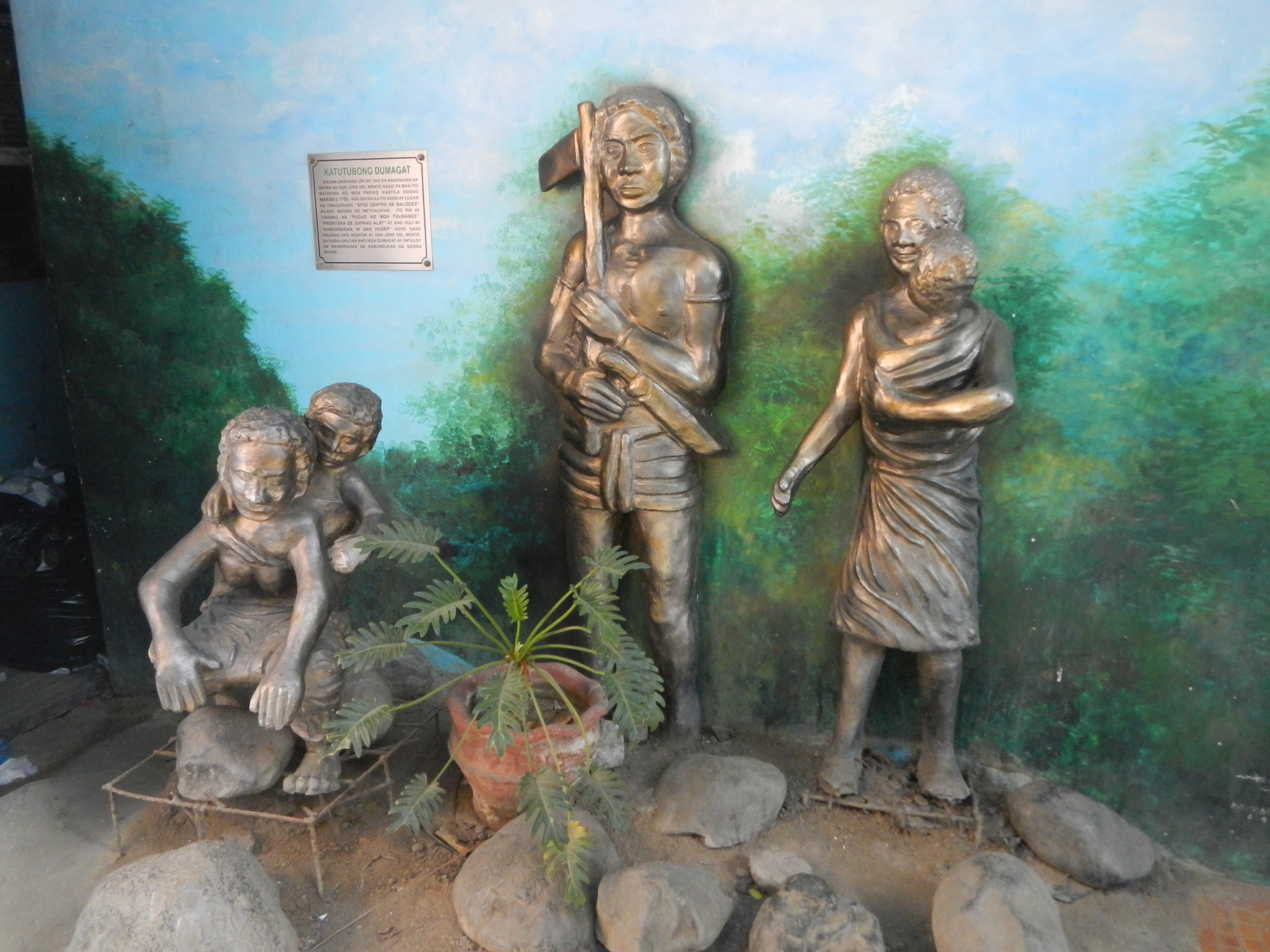
A relief depicting the Dumagat people before the Spaniards came in San Jose del Monte, Bulacan.

Dumagat–Remontado communities are organized around extended family units that cooperate in subsistence activities. Their society is generally egalitarian, with little formal hierarchy and an emphasis on cooperation, reciprocity, and mutual aid. Leadership is informal and situational, often exercised by elders or individuals with recognized experience or wisdom. Decisions affecting the community are made collectively, reflecting shared responsibility and consensus-based practices. Similar to other Agta and Negrito groups, kinship ties and resource sharing play a central role in maintaining social cohesion and ensuring group survival.

=== Beliefs ===
The Dumagat–Remontado follow animistic beliefs, recognizing spirits of forests, rivers, and inanimate objects. Conversion to Christianity has occurred in some areas, but traditional rituals persist.

The Remontados of the Sierra Madre mountains believe in life after death, with the bibit or spirit of the dead thought to return after the body expires. Traditionally, the deceased were buried where they died, the house was burned, and mourners sang the dalet for nine nights to guide the spirit across a stream to the afterlife. Modern practices now include wakes and burials in distant cemeteries, reflecting changes brought by acculturation and social adaptation.

=== Dance and music ===
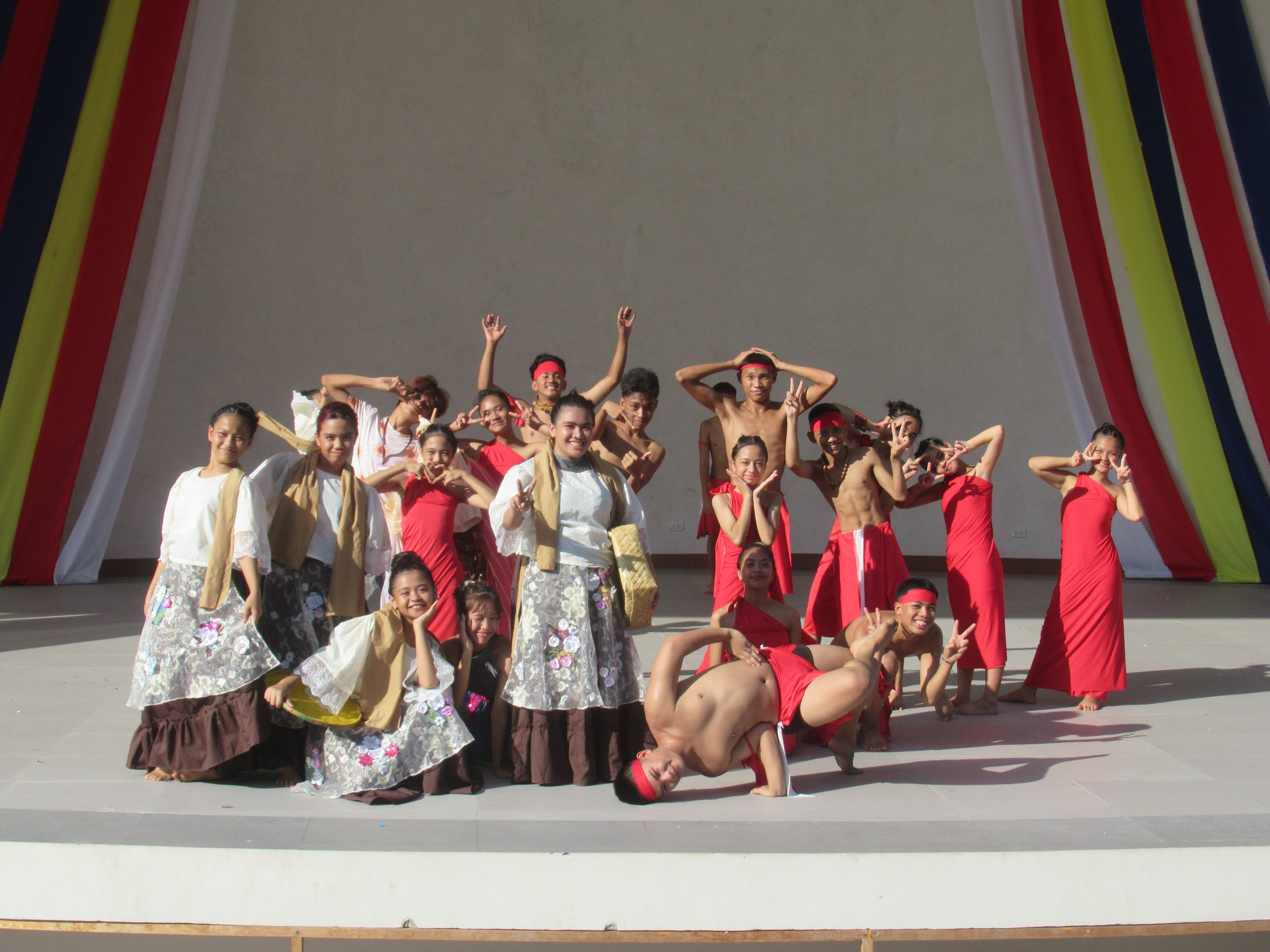
Dancers pose after performing the Dumagat rain dance.

Music and dance hold a significant place in Dumagat–Remontados life, serving both social and spiritual purposes. The Dumagat are fond of singing during feasts, gatherings, and ceremonies, where they perform the ilda, or song in rhyme, while walking, working, or resting after harvest while drinking lambanog, a locally purchased wine. Songs are sung to celebrate baptism, express affection through kundiman or love songs accompanied by guitar, and to pay homage to the dead. Music functions as a form of storytelling and oral history, often reflecting ancestral wisdom and daily experiences.

In contemporary settings, Dumagat–Remontado communities continue to use music and dance as expressions of cultural identity and social unity. Songs such as "Un Potok" ("The Land") have become symbols of resistance and solidarity in their struggle against extractive and dam projects affecting their ancestral domains.

The Dumagat are also known for traditional dances that express their connection with nature and community. They perform dances such as the fandango during feasts, and ritual dances like the rain dance, performed as a prayer for rain during drought or when water levels drop. The Cultural Center of the Philippines (CCP) recognizes Mali as a traditional Dumagat dance likened to agawan base (a kid's game), considered the national game of the Dumagats from San Jose del Monte, Bulacan. Mali is performed at night by the riverside after a day of work, involving two teams defending their bases and a leader guiding the play. These traditional dances contribute to the community's vitality and enhance their sense of joy and pride in their Dumagat identity.

=== Food and cuisine ===
Traditional Dumagat cuisine reflects their close relationship with the forest and river environment, as well as sustainable subsistence practices. Common foods include root crops, fruits, and other forest produce, along with game animals and fish obtained through hunting and fishing. Meals are often prepared simply, boiled or roasted, and flavored with salt, herbs, or coconut milk.

Some notable traditional dishes include sinagumpit, a mix of freshwater fish with young rattan shoots and coconut milk, and sinigang prepared in bamboo tubes with souring fruits such as katmon. Chicken may also be cooked underground, wrapped in banana leaves, in a slow-cooking pit method. In addition, the Dumagat–Remontados traditionally prepare ginataang pugahan na may suso, a coconut milk dish with pugahan (Caryota mitis) and suso (Pomacea canaliculata) similar to ginataang kuhol, and adobo sa buho, in which sliced pork is cooked inside bamboo with bay leaves, garlic, onion, pepper, and soy sauce over an open fire. Both dishes are prepared in bamboo, reflecting the use of natural materials and traditional cooking techniques.

== Contemporary issues ==
Dumagat–Remontado communities face continuing challenges related to land rights, cultural preservation, and environmental degradation. Large-scale development projects have had significant impacts on their ancestral domains, particularly the construction of the Kaliwa Dam on the Kaliwa River in Quezon Province. The project, part of the New Centennial Water Source initiative, has been met with opposition from Dumagat–Remontado groups who assert that it threatens their ancestral lands, sacred sites, and access to clean water. Despite government assurances of consultation and compensation, reports from advocacy organizations and journalists indicate that affected communities have expressed limited participation in decision-making and fear displacement.

In addition to dam construction, Dumagat–Remontado communities contend with logging, mining, and agricultural encroachment that contribute to forest loss and resource depletion. Efforts to secure Certificates of Ancestral Domain Title (CADT) under the Indigenous Peoples' Rights Act (IPRA) continue, though bureaucratic and political barriers have slowed progress. Nevertheless, local and national advocacy groups have supported the Dumagat–Remontado in asserting their rights and revitalizing traditional knowledge systems to strengthen community resilience.
