= Calamba–Los Baños Expressway =

Road in the Philippines

Route information
- Length: 15.5 km (9.6 mi)

Major junctions
- North end: E2 (South Luzon Expressway) in Calamba
- South end: Bay, Laguna

Location
- Country: Philippines
- Major cities: Calamba
- Towns: Los Baños, Bay

Highway system
- Roads in the Philippines; Highways; Expressways; List

The Calamba–Los Baños Expressway was a proposed expressway in the Philippines that will start at the South Luzon Expressway Extension (Calamba Exit), traverse along Laguna de Bay, and end up connecting a national road at Bay, Laguna. The construction of the four-lane, 15.5-kilometer-long (9.6 mi) expressway will cost an estimated PHP5.9 billion or US$131.11 million. When constructed, it was expected to ease the traffic in the Calamba-Los Baños area, particularly along Calamba–Pagsanjan Road.

== See also ==
- Laguna Lakeshore Expressway Dike
