= Gezhouba Group =

Chinese construction and engineering company

China Gezhouba Group Company Limited
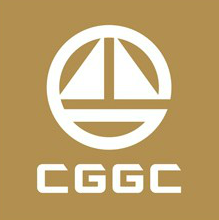
- Native name: 中国葛洲坝集团股份有限公司
- Traded as: SSE: 600068
- Industry: Hydroelectric engineering, power transmission construction, transportation construction, real estate development
- Founded: January 23, 2006
- Headquarters: Wuhan, China
- Area served: Worldwide
- Revenue: ▲CN¥71.605 billion (2014)
- Net income: ▲CN¥2.287 billion (2014)
- Total assets: ▲CN¥104.900 billion (2014)
- Owner: China Gezhouba Group Corporation (40.8%)
- Number of employees: 39,698 (2014)
- Website: http://www.cggc.ceec.net.cn/

China Gezhouba Group Company Limited (中国葛洲坝集团股份有限公司) is a Chinese construction and engineering company based in Wuhan, Hubei, primarily engaged in the construction of hydroelectric power plants, dams, roads, bridges and other civil engineering works in China and abroad. It operates in more than 60 countries across South Asia, Southeast Asia, the Middle East, Africa, Latin America and Oceania.

== Corporate ==
The company's largest shareholder (40.8%) is state-owned China Gezhouba Group Corporation (CGGC), itself a subsidiary of China Energy Engineering Corporation.

== Projects ==
=== Domestic ===
Gezhouba was the principal civil works contractor for the Three Gorges Dam project on the Yangtze River, China's largest hydroelectric project. The company also undertook civil works at the Wudongde hydropower station (10.2 GW), one of the cascade stations on the lower Jinsha River.

=== Asia ===
In 2010, Gezhouba signed a 4.97 billion yuan ($727.78 million) contract with Kazakhstan Natural Gas Technology to build a hydroelectric plant on the Chilik River in Kazakhstan. In 2014, it was awarded a contract to construct a 40 km section of the Hazara Motorway in Pakistan.

=== Africa ===
Gezhouba has been active in Africa's hydropower sector since the mid-2000s, with projects across more than a dozen countries.

In Ethiopia, the company built the 197 MW Amerti Neshe Hydroelectric Power Plant (completed 2011) and the 254 MW Genale Dawa III project, and participated in early works at the Grand Ethiopian Renaissance Dam (GERD).

In the Democratic Republic of the Congo, Gezhouba led construction of the 240 MW Busanga Dam.

Its largest African project is the Caculo Cabaça Hydroelectric Power Station in Angola (2,172 MW), one of the continent's largest hydropower projects under construction. The project is financed largely by Chinese policy banks and is expected to supply over 40% of Angola's electricity demand.

=== Latin America ===
Since 2015, Gezhouba has led construction of the Cóndor Cliff–La Barrancosa hydroelectric complex in Argentina as part of UTE Represas Patagonia.

The project has faced repeated suspensions, with partial resumption of La Barrancosa in 2026 following a new financing disbursement.
